= Minister of the Interior (Austria) =

Minister of the Interior Bundesminister für Inneres
- Coat of arms

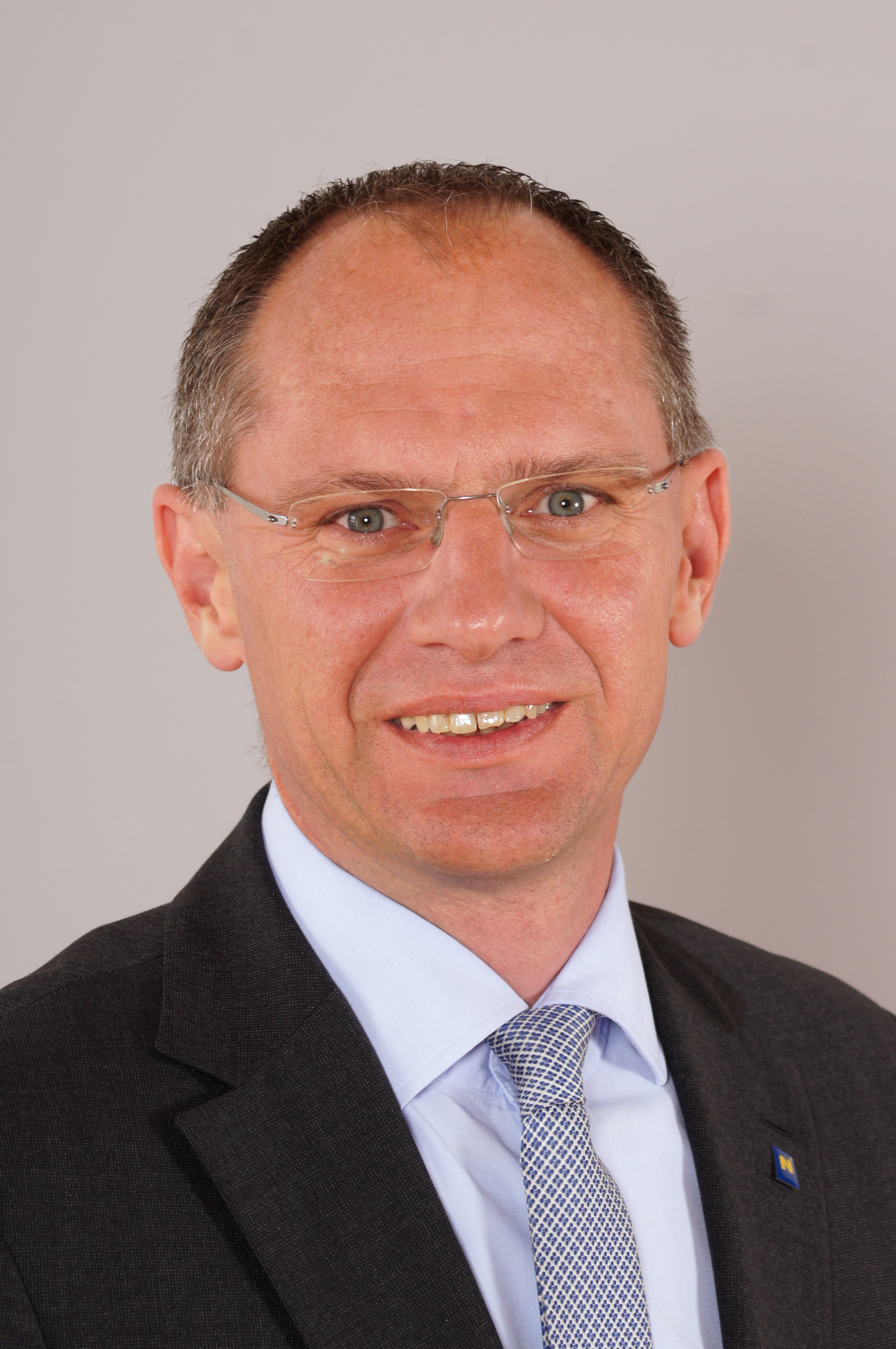
- Incumbent; Gerhard Karner since 6 December 2021
- Style: Mr. Minister; His Excellency
- Type: Interior Minister
- Status: Supreme executive organ Minister
- Member of: Cabinet; National Security Council
- Seat: Ministry of the Interior, Minoritenplatz, Innere Stadt, Vienna
- Appointer: The president on advice of the chancellor
- Term length: No fixed term
- Constituting instrument: Constitution of Austria; Security Policing Act
- Precursor: Interior Minister of Cisleithania
- Formation: 10 November 1920 (105 years ago)
- First holder: Heinrich Mataja
- Website: bmi.gv.at

The minister of the interior (German: Bundesminister für Inneres) is the head and chief executive of the Ministry of the Interior as well as the ultimate authority in matters public security in Austria.

The incumbent minister of the Interior is Gerhard Karner (ÖVP). The minister is appointed by the president on advice of the chancellor.

== Powers and duties ==
The Federal Constitutional Law itself expressly designates the minister as the supreme authority in matters of public security (Oberste Sicherheitsbehörde) and places the police directorates immediately beneath the control of the minister. In this capacity, and as a supreme executive organ, the minister bears ultimate responsibly for the direction of law enforcement and the administration of security policy, and cannot be overruled by any other officer or body within the executive branch. The minister is assisted by a secretary general, who administers the day-to-day ministerial operations, and by a director general for public security, who serves as Austria's top career law enforcement officer and superintends most specialized police agencies.

The minister of the interior is the only constitutionally mandated minister position in Austria.

== List of ministers ==
=== Austrian Empire ===
No.	Portrait	Minister of the Interior	Took office	Left office	Time in office
1	Franz Anton von Kolowrat-Liebsteinsky	Franz Anton von Kolowrat-Liebsteinsky (1778–1861)	29 September 1826	20 March 1848	21 years, 173 days
2	Baron Franz von Pillersdorf	Baron Franz von Pillersdorf (1786–1862)	20 March 1848	8 July 1848	110 days
3	Baron Anton von Doblhoff-Dier	Baron Anton von Doblhoff-Dier (1800–1872)	8 July 1848	30 October 1848	114 days
4	Franz Stadion, Count von Warthausen	Franz Stadion, Count von Warthausen (1806–1853)	21 November 1848	28 July 1849	249 days
5	Baron Alexander von Bach	Baron Alexander von Bach (1813–1893)	28 July 1849	22 August 1859	10 years, 25 days
6	Agenor Romuald Gołuchowski	Agenor Romuald Gołuchowski (1812–1875)	22 August 1859	13 December 1860	1 year, 113 days
7	Anton von Schmerling	Anton von Schmerling (1806–1893)	13 December 1860	26 June 1865	4 years, 195 days
8	Count Richard Belcredi	Count Richard Belcredi (1823–1902)	27 July 1865	7 February 1867	1 year, 226 days
9	Friedrich Ferdinand von Beust	Friedrich Ferdinand von Beust (1809–1886)	7 February 1867	7 March 1867	28 days
10	Eduard Taaffe, 11th Viscount Taaffe	Eduard Taaffe, 11th Viscount Taaffe (1833–1895)	7 March 1867	30 December 1867	298 days

=== Cisleithania ===
No.	Portrait	Minister of the Interior	Took office	Left office	Time in office
1	Carl Giskra	Carl Giskra (1820–1879)	1 January 1868	22 March 1870	2 years, 80 days
2	Eduard Taaffe, 11th Viscount Taaffe	Eduard Taaffe, 11th Viscount Taaffe (1833–1895)	14 April 1870	6 February 1871	298 days
3	Count Karl Sigmund von Hohenwart	Count Karl Sigmund von Hohenwart (1824–1899)	7 February 1871	30 October 1871	265 days
4	Baron Ludwig von Holzgethan	Baron Ludwig von Holzgethan (1800–1876); Acting	30 October 1871	24 November 1871	25 days
5	Josef Lasser von Zollheim [de]	Josef Lasser von Zollheim (1814–1879)	25 November 1871	5 July 1878	6 years, 222 days
6	Prince Adolf of Auersperg	Prince Adolf of Auersperg (1821–1885)	5 July 1878	15 February 1879	225 days
-	Karl von Stremayr	Karl von Stremayr (1823–1904); Acting	15 February 1879	12 August 1879	178 days
(2)	Eduard Taaffe, 11th Viscount Taaffe	Eduard Taaffe, 11th Viscount Taaffe (1833–1895)	12 August 1879	11 November 1893	14 years, 91 days
-	Karl von Stremayr	Karl von Stremayr (1823–1904); Acting	12 August 1879	16 February 1880	188 days
-	Sigmund Conrad von Eybesfeld [de]	Sigmund Conrad von Eybesfeld (1821–1898); Acting	16 February 1880	5 November 1885	5 years, 262 days
-	Paul Gautsch von Frankenthurn	Paul Gautsch von Frankenthurn (1851–1918); Acting	5 November 1885	11 November 1893	8 years, 6 days
6	Olivier Marquis de Bacquehem [de]	Olivier Marquis de Bacquehem (1847–1917)	11 November 1893	18 June 1895	1 year, 219 days
7	Count Erich Kielmansegg	Count Erich Kielmansegg (1847–1923)	18 June 1895	30 September 1895	104 days
8	Count Kazimierz Feliks Badeni	Count Kazimierz Feliks Badeni (1846–1909)	30 September 1895	28 November 1897	2 years, 59 days
9	Paul Gautsch von Frankenthurn	Paul Gautsch von Frankenthurn (1851–1918)	28 November 1897	5 March 1898	97 days
10	Franz, Prince of Thun and Hohenstein	Franz, Prince of Thun and Hohenstein (1847–1916)	5 March 1898	2 October 1899	1 year, 211 days
11	Ernest von Koerber	Ernest von Koerber (1850–1919)	2 October 1899	21 December 1899	80 days
12	Josef Stummer [cs]	Josef Stummer (1834–1903)	21 December 1899	18 January 1900	1 year, 0 days
(11)	Ernest von Koerber	Ernest von Koerber (1850–1919)	18 January 1900	27 December 1904	4 years, 344 days
13	Artur Bylandt-Rheidt [de]	Artur Bylandt-Rheidt (1854–1915)	1 January 1905	30 April 1906	1 year, 119 days
14	Prince Konrad of Hohenlohe-Waldenburg-Schillingsfürst	Prince Konrad of Hohenlohe-Waldenburg-Schillingsfürst (1863–1918)	2 May 1906	28 May 1906	26 days
15	Count Richard von Bienerth-Schmerling	Count Richard von Bienerth-Schmerling (1863–1918)	2 June 1906	7 November 1908	2 years, 158 days
16	Baron Guido von Haerdtl [de]	Baron Guido von Haerdtl (1859–1928)	15 November 1908	9 January 1911	2 years, 55 days
17	Max Wickenburg [de]	Max Wickenburg (1857–1918)	9 January 1911	28 October 1911	292 days
18	Karl Heinold [cs]	Karl Heinold (1862–1943)	3 November 1911	30 November 1915	4 years, 27 days
(14)	Prince Konrad of Hohenlohe-Waldenburg-Schillingsfürst	Prince Konrad of Hohenlohe-Waldenburg-Schillingsfürst (1863–1918)	30 November 1915	29 August 1916	273 days
19	Erasmus von Handel [de]	Erasmus von Handel (1860–1928)	29 August 1916	21 October 1916	53 days
20	Erwin Schwartzenau [de]	Erwin Schwartzenau (1858–1926)	31 October 1916	13 December 1916	43 days
(19)	Erasmus von Handel [de]	Erasmus von Handel (1860–1928)	20 December 1916	23 June 1917	185 days
21	Friedrich von Toggenburg [de]	Friedrich von Toggenburg (1860–1928)	23 June 1917	11 June 1918	353 days
22	Edmund von Gayer [de]	Edmund von Gayer (1860–1952)	11 June 1918	22 July 1918	41 days
(21)	Edmund von Gayer [de]	Edmund von Gayer (1860–1952)	25 July 1918	11 November 1918	109 days

=== First Republic ===
No.	Portrait	Minister of the Interior	Took office	Left office	Time in office	Party	Cabinet
1	Heinrich Mataja	Heinrich Mataja (1877–1937)	30 October 1918	15 March 1919	136 days	CS	Renner I Cabinet
2	Karl Renner	Karl Renner (1870–1950)	15 March 1919	9 May 1919	55 days	SDAPÖ	Renner II Cabinet
3	Matthias Eldersch	Matthias Eldersch (1869–1931)	9 May 1919	7 July 1920	1 year, 59 days	SDAPÖ	Renner II–III
4	Walter Breisky	Walter Breisky (1871–1944)	7 July 1920	20 November 1920	136 days	Independent	Mayr I Cabinet
5	Egon Glanz [de]	Egon Glanz (1880–1945)	20 November 1920	7 April 1921	138 days	Independent	Mayr II Cabinet
-	Walter Breisky	Walter Breisky (1871–1944); Acting	7 April 1921	23 April 1921	16 days	Independent	Mayr II Cabinet
6	Rudolf Ramek	Rudolf Ramek (1881–1941)	23 April 1921	21 June 1921	59 days	CS	Mayr II Cabinet
7	Leopold Waber	Leopold Waber (1875–1945)	21 June 1921	16 January 1922	209 days	GDVP	Schober I Cabinet
-	Johann Schober	Johann Schober (1874–1932); Acting	16 January 1922	26 January 1922	10 days	Independent	Schober I Cabinet
-	Walter Breisky	Walter Breisky (1871–1944); Acting	26 January 1922	27 January 1922	1 day	Independent	Breisky Cabinet
-	Johann Schober	Johann Schober (1874–1932); Acting	27 January 1922	31 May 1922	124 days	Independent	Schober II Cabinet
8	Felix Frank	Felix Frank (1874–1932)	31 May 1922	17 April 1923	321 days	GDVP	Seipel I Cabinet
9	Ignaz Seipel	Ignaz Seipel (1874–1932)	17 April 1923	22 November 1924	1 year, 219 days	CS	Seipel II–III
(6)	Rudolf Ramek	Rudolf Ramek (1881–1941)	22 November 1924	20 October 1926	59 days	CS	Ramek I Cabinet–II
(9)	Ignaz Seipel	Ignaz Seipel (1874–1932)	20 October 1926	4 May 1929	2 years, 196 days	CS	Seipel II–III; Ramek I–II; Seipel IV–V
10	Ernst Streeruwitz	Ernst Streeruwitz (1874–1932)	4 May 1929	26 September 1929	145 days	CS	Streeruwitz Cabinet
11	Vinzenz Schumy [de]	Vinzenz Schumy (1878–1962)	26 September 1929	30 September 1930	1 year, 4 days	Landbund	Schober III Cabinet
12	Ernst Rüdiger Starhemberg	Ernst Rüdiger Starhemberg (1878–1962)	30 September 1930	4 December 1930	65 days	Heimatblock	Vaugoin Cabinet
13	Franz Winkler [de]	Franz Winkler (1890–1945)	4 December 1930	20 May 1932	1 year, 168 days	Landbund	Ender Cabinet; Buresch I Cabinet–II
14	Franz Bachinger [de]	Franz Bachinger (1892–1938)	20 May 1932	10 May 1933	355 days	Landbund	Dollfuss I Cabinet
(11)	Vinzenz Schumy [de]	Vinzenz Schumy (1878–1962)	10 May 1933	23 September 1933	136 days	Landbund	Dollfuss I Cabinet
15	Robert Kerber [de]	Robert Kerber (1884–1977)	23 September 1933	30 July 1934	310 days	CS	Dollfuss II Cabinet
16	Emil Fey	Emil Fey (1886–1938)	30 July 1934	29 October 1935	1 year, 91 days	Heimatblock	Dollfuss II Cabinet
17	Eduard Baar-Baarenfels	Eduard Baar-Baarenfels (1885–1967)	29 October 1935	3 November 1936	1 year, 5 days	VF	Schuschnigg I Cabinet–II
18	Kurt Schuschnigg	Kurt Schuschnigg (1897–1977)	3 November 1936	6 November 1936	3 days	VF	Schuschnigg II Cabinet
19	Edmund Glaise-Horstenau	Edmund Glaise-Horstenau (1882–1946)	6 November 1936	16 February 1938	1 year, 102 days	VF	Schuschnigg III Cabinet
20	Arthur Seyß-Inquart	Arthur Seyß-Inquart (1892–1946)	16 February 1938	13 March 1938	25 days	DNSAP	Schuschnigg IV Cabinet; Seyss-Inquart Cabinet

=== Second Republic ===
No.	Portrait	Minister of the Interior	Took office	Left office	Time in office	Party	Cabinet
1	Franz Honner [de]	Franz Honner (1893–1964)	27 April 1945	20 December 1945	237 days	KPÖ	Renner IV Cabinet
2	Oskar Helmer	Oskar Helmer (1893–1964)	20 December 1945	16 July 1959	13 years, 208 days	SPÖ	Figl I Cabinet–II–III; Raab I Cabinet–II
3	Josef Afritsch	Josef Afritsch (1901–1964)	16 July 1959	27 March 1963	3 years, 254 days	SPÖ	Raab III Cabinet–II; Gorbach I Cabinet
4	Franz Olah	Franz Olah (1910–2009)	27 March 1963	21 September 1964	1 year, 178 days	SPÖ	Gorbach II Cabinet
5	Hans Czettel [de]	Hans Czettel (1923–1980)	21 September 1964	19 April 1966	1 year, 210 days	SPÖ	Klaus I Cabinet
6	Franz Hetzenauer [de]	Franz Hetzenauer (1911–2006)	19 April 1966	19 January 1968	1 year, 275 days	ÖVP	Klaus II Cabinet
7	Franz Soronics [de]	Franz Soronics (1920–2009)	19 January 1968	21 April 1970	2 years, 92 days	ÖVP	Klaus II Cabinet
8	Otto Rösch	Otto Rösch (1917–1995)	21 April 1970	8 June 1977	7 years, 48 days	SPÖ	Kreisky I Cabinet–II–III
9	Erwin Lanc	Erwin Lanc (1930–2025)	8 June 1977	24 May 1983	5 years, 350 days	SPÖ	Kreisky III Cabinet–II
10	Karl Blecha [de]	Karl Blecha (born 1933)	24 May 1983	2 February 1989	5 years, 254 days	SPÖ	Sinowatz Cabinet; Vranitzky I Cabinet–II
11	Franz Löschnak	Franz Löschnak (born 1940)	2 February 1989	6 April 1995	6 years, 63 days	SPÖ	Vranitzky II–III–IV
12	Caspar Einem	Caspar Einem (1948–2021)	6 April 1995	28 January 1997	1 year, 297 days	SPÖ	Vranitzky IV Cabinet–II
13	Karl Schlögl	Karl Schlögl (born 1955)	28 January 1997	2 March 2000	3 years, 34 days	SPÖ	Klima Cabinet
14	Ernst Strasser	Ernst Strasser (born 1956)	2 March 2000	11 December 2004	4 years, 284 days	ÖVP	Schüssel I Cabinet–II
–	Günther Platter	Günther Platter (born 1954); Acting	11 December 2004	22 December 2004	11 days	ÖVP	Schüssel II Cabinet
15	Liese Prokop	Liese Prokop (1941–2006)	22 December 2004	31 December 2006 †	2 years, 9 days	ÖVP	Schüssel II Cabinet
–	Wolfgang Schüssel	Wolfgang Schüssel (born 1945); Acting	2 January 2007	11 January 2007	9 days	ÖVP	Schüssel II Cabinet
16	Günther Platter	Günther Platter (born 1954)	11 January 2007	30 June 2008	171 days	ÖVP	Gusenbauer Cabinet
–	Wilhelm Molterer	Wilhelm Molterer (born 1955); Acting	30 June 2008	1 July 2008	1 day	ÖVP	Gusenbauer Cabinet
17	Maria Fekter	Maria Fekter (born 1956)	1 July 2008	21 April 2011	2 years, 294 days	ÖVP	Gusenbauer Cabinet; Faymann I Cabinet
18	Johanna Mikl-Leitner	Johanna Mikl-Leitner (born 1964)	21 April 2011	21 April 2016	5 years, 0 days	ÖVP	Faymann I Cabinet–II
19	Wolfgang Sobotka	Wolfgang Sobotka (born 1956)	21 April 2016	18 December 2017	1 year, 241 days	ÖVP	Faymann II Cabinet; Kern Cabinet
20	Herbert Kickl	Herbert Kickl (born 1968)	18 December 2017	20 May 2019	1 year, 153 days	FPÖ	Kurz I Cabinet
21	Eckart Ratz	Eckart Ratz (born 1953)	22 May 2019	3 June 2019	12 days	Independent	Kurz I Cabinet
22	Wolfgang Peschorn	Wolfgang Peschorn (born 1965)	3 June 2019	7 January 2020	218 days	Independent	Bierlein Cabinet
23	Karl Nehammer	Karl Nehammer (born 1972)	7 January 2020	6 December 2021	1 year, 333 days	ÖVP	Kurz II Cabinet; Schallenberg Cabinet
24	Gerhard Karner	Gerhard Karner (born 1967)	6 December 2021	incumbent	4 years, 276 days	ÖVP	Nehammer Cabinet; Stocker Cabinet
