= Schober government =

Schober government may refer to one of the two cabinets of Johannes Schober:

- First Schober government, a short-lived coalition government operating from 1921 to 1922
- Second Schober government, a short-lived coalition government operating from 1922 to 1922

== See also ==
- Government of Austria
- List of chancellors of Austria
