= List of ministers of finance (Austria) =

Minister of Finance
- Bundesminister für Finanzen
- Coat of arms
- Ministry of Finance
- Style: Mr. Federal minister (formal)
- Member of: Federal Government; Council of Ministers
- Nominator: Political parties
- Appointer: The president on advice of the chancellor
- Constituting instrument: Constitution of Austria
- First holder: Otto Steinwender first Republic; Georg Zimmermann second Republic
- Website: Official website

The minister of finance of Austria (German: Bundesminister für Finanzen) heads the Ministry of Finance.

== Ministers ==
=== First Republic ===
No.	Portrait	Name (Born-Died)	Term			Political Party	Government
No.	Portrait	Name (Born-Died)	Took office	Left office (Note: Based on when the successor took office)	Duration	Political Party	Government
1	Otto Steinwender	Otto Steinwender (1847–1921)	30 October 1918	15 March 1919	136 days	DNP	Renner I Cabinet
2	Joseph Schumpeter	Joseph Schumpeter (1883–1950)	15 March 1919	17 October 1919	216 days	Independent	Renner II Cabinet
3	Richard Reisch [de]	Richard Reisch (1866–1938)	17 October 1919	20 November 1920	1 year, 34 days	Independent	Renner III Cabinet; Mayr I Cabinet
4	Ferdinand Grimm [de]	Ferdinand Grimm (1869–1948)	20 November 1920	7 October 1921	321 days	Independent	Mayr II Cabinet; Schober I Cabinet
5	Alfred Gürtler	Alfred Gürtler (1875–1933)	7 October 1921	10 May 1922	215 days	CS	Schober I Cabinet–II
-	Johann Schober	Johann Schober (1874–1932); Acting	10 May 1922	31 May 1922	21 days	Independent	Schober II Cabinet
6	August Ségur-Cabanac [de]	August Ségur-Cabanac (1881–1931)	31 May 1922	14 November 1922	167 days	CS	Seipel I Cabinet
7	Viktor Kienböck [de]	Viktor Kienböck (1873–1956)	14 November 1922	20 November 1924	2 years, 6 days	CS	Seipel I Cabinet–II–III
8	Jakob Ahrer [de]	Jakob Ahrer (1888–1962)	20 November 1924	15 January 1926	1 year, 56 days	CS	Ramek I Cabinet
9	Josef Kollmann [de]	Josef Kollmann (1868–1951)	15 January 1926	20 October 1926	278 days	CS	Ramek II Cabinet
(7)	Viktor Kienböck [de]	Viktor Kienböck (1873–1956)	20 October 1926	4 May 1929	2 years, 196 days	CS	Seipel IV Cabinet–II
10	Johann Josef Mittelberger [de]	Johann Josef Mittelberger (1879–1963)	4 May 1929	26 September 1929	145 days	CS	Streeruwitz Cabinet
–	Johann Schober	Johann Schober (1874–1932); Acting	26 September 1929	16 October 1929	20 days	Independent	Schober III Cabinet
11	Otto Juch [de]	Otto Juch (1876–1964)	16 October 1929	20 June 1931	1 year, 247 days	Independent	Schober III Cabinet; Vaugoin Cabinet; Ender Cabinet
12	Josef Redlich [de]	Josef Redlich (1869–1936)	20 June 1931	5 October 1931	107 days	Independent	Buresch I Cabinet
13	Karl Buresch	Karl Buresch (1878–1936)	5 October 1931	16 October 1931	11 days	CS	Buresch I Cabinet
14	Emanuel Weidenhoffer [de]	Emanuel Weidenhoffer (1878–1939)	16 October 1931	16 May 1933	1 year, 212 days	CS	Buresch II Cabinet; Dollfuss I Cabinet
(13)	Karl Buresch	Karl Buresch (1878–1936)	16 May 1933	17 October 1935	2 years, 154 days	CS; VF	Dollfuss I Cabinet–II; Schuschnigg I Cabinet
15	Ludwig Draxler	Ludwig Draxler (1896–1972)	17 October 1935	3 November 1936	1 year, 17 days	VF	Schuschnigg I Cabinet–II–III
16	Rudolf Neumayer [de]	Rudolf Neumayer (1887–1977)	3 November 1936	13 March 1938	1 year, 130 days	VF; NSDAP	Schuschnigg III Cabinet–II; Seyss-Inquart Cabinet

=== Second Republic ===
No.	Portrait	Name (Born-Died)	Term			Political Party	Government
No.	Portrait	Name (Born-Died)	Took office	Left office	Duration	Political Party	Government
1	Georg Zimmermann [de]	Georg Zimmermann (1897–1958)	20 December 1945	8 November 1949	3 years, 323 days	Independent	Renner IV Cabinet; Figl I Cabinet
2	Eugen Margarétha [de]	Eugen Margarétha (1885–1963)	8 November 1949	23 January 1952	2 years, 76 days	ÖVP	Figl II Cabinet
3	Reinhard Kamitz [de]	Reinhard Kamitz (1907–1993)	23 January 1952	17 June 1960	8 years, 146 days	Independent	Figl II Cabinet–II; Raab I Cabinet–II–III
4	Eduard Heilingsetzer [de]	Eduard Heilingsetzer (1905–1997)	17 June 1960	11 April 1961	298 days	ÖVP	Raab III Cabinet–II
5	Josef Klaus	Josef Klaus (1910–2001)	11 April 1961	27 March 1963	1 year, 350 days	ÖVP	Gorbach I Cabinet
6	Franz Korinek [de]	Franz Korinek (1907–1985)	27 March 1963	2 April 1964	1 year, 6 days	ÖVP	Gorbach II Cabinet
7	Wolfgang Schmitz [de]	Wolfgang Schmitz (1923–2008)	2 April 1964	19 January 1968	3 years, 292 days	ÖVP	Klaus I Cabinet–II
8	Stephan Koren [de]	Stephan Koren (1919–1988)	19 January 1968	21 April 1970	2 years, 92 days	ÖVP	Klaus II Cabinet
9	Hannes Androsch	Hannes Androsch (1938–2024)	21 April 1970	20 January 1981	10 years, 274 days	SPÖ	Kreisky I Cabinet–II–III–IV
10	Herbert Salcher	Herbert Salcher (1929–2021)	20 January 1981	10 September 1984	3 years, 234 days	SPÖ	Kreisky IV Cabinet; Sinowatz Cabinet
11	Franz Vranitzky	Franz Vranitzky (born 1937)	10 September 1984	16 June 1986	1 year, 279 days	SPÖ	Sinowatz Cabinet
12	Ferdinand Lacina	Ferdinand Lacina (born 1942)	16 June 1986	6 April 1995	8 years, 294 days	SPÖ	Sinowatz Cabinet; Vranitzky I Cabinet–II–III–IV
13	Andreas Staribacher [de]	Andreas Staribacher (born 1957)	6 April 1995	3 January 1996	272 days	SPÖ	Vranitzky IV Cabinet
–	Viktor Klima	Viktor Klima (born 1947); Acting	3 January 1996	12 March 1996	69 days	SPÖ	Vranitzky IV Cabinet
14	Viktor Klima	Viktor Klima (born 1947)	12 March 1996	28 January 1997	322 days	SPÖ	Vranitzky V Cabinet
15	Rudolf Edlinger	Rudolf Edlinger (1940–2021)	28 January 1997	4 February 2000	3 years, 7 days	SPÖ	Klima Cabinet
16	Karl-Heinz Grasser	Karl-Heinz Grasser (born 1969); Non-partisan from 2003	4 February 2000	11 January 2007	6 years, 341 days	FPÖ; Independent	Schüssel I Cabinet–II
17	Wilhelm Molterer	Wilhelm Molterer (born 1955)	11 January 2007	2 December 2008	1 year, 326 days	ÖVP	Gusenbauer Cabinet
18	Josef Pröll	Josef Pröll (born 1968)	2 December 2008	21 April 2011	2 years, 140 days	ÖVP	Faymann I Cabinet
19	Maria Fekter	Maria Fekter (born 1956)	21 April 2011	16 December 2013	2 years, 239 days	ÖVP	Faymann I Cabinet
20	Michael Spindelegger	Michael Spindelegger (born 1959)	16 December 2013	1 September 2014	259 days	ÖVP	Faymann II Cabinet
21	Hans Jörg Schelling	Hans Jörg Schelling (born 1953)	1 September 2014	18 December 2017	3 years, 108 days	ÖVP	Faymann II Cabinet; Kern Cabinet
22	Hartwig Löger	Hartwig Löger (born 1965)	18 December 2017	3 June 2019	1 year, 167 days	ÖVP	Kurz I Cabinet
23	Eduard Müller	Eduard Müller (born 1962)	3 June 2019	7 January 2020	218 days	Independent	Bierlein Cabinet
24	Gernot Blümel	Gernot Blümel (born 1981)	7 January 2020	6 December 2021	1 year, 333 days	ÖVP	Kurz II Cabinet; Schallenberg Cabinet
25	Magnus Brunner	Magnus Brunner (born 1972)	6 December 2021	20 November 2024	4 years, 275 days	ÖVP	Nehammer Cabinet
26	Gunter Mayr	Gunter Mayr (born 1972)	20 November 2024	3 March 2025	4 years, 275 days	Independent	Nehammer Cabinet; Schallenberg II Cabinet
27	Markus Marterbauer	Markus Marterbauer (born 1965)	3 March 2025	Incumbent	1 year, 157 days	SPÖ	Stocker Cabinet

== See also ==
- Ministry of Finance (Austria)
