= List of chancellors of Austria =

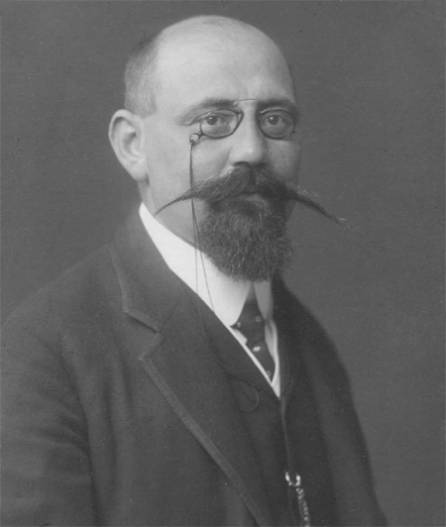
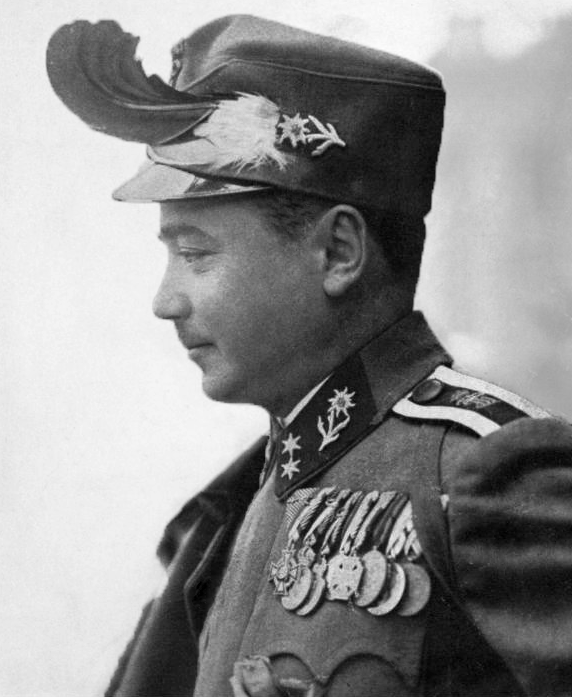
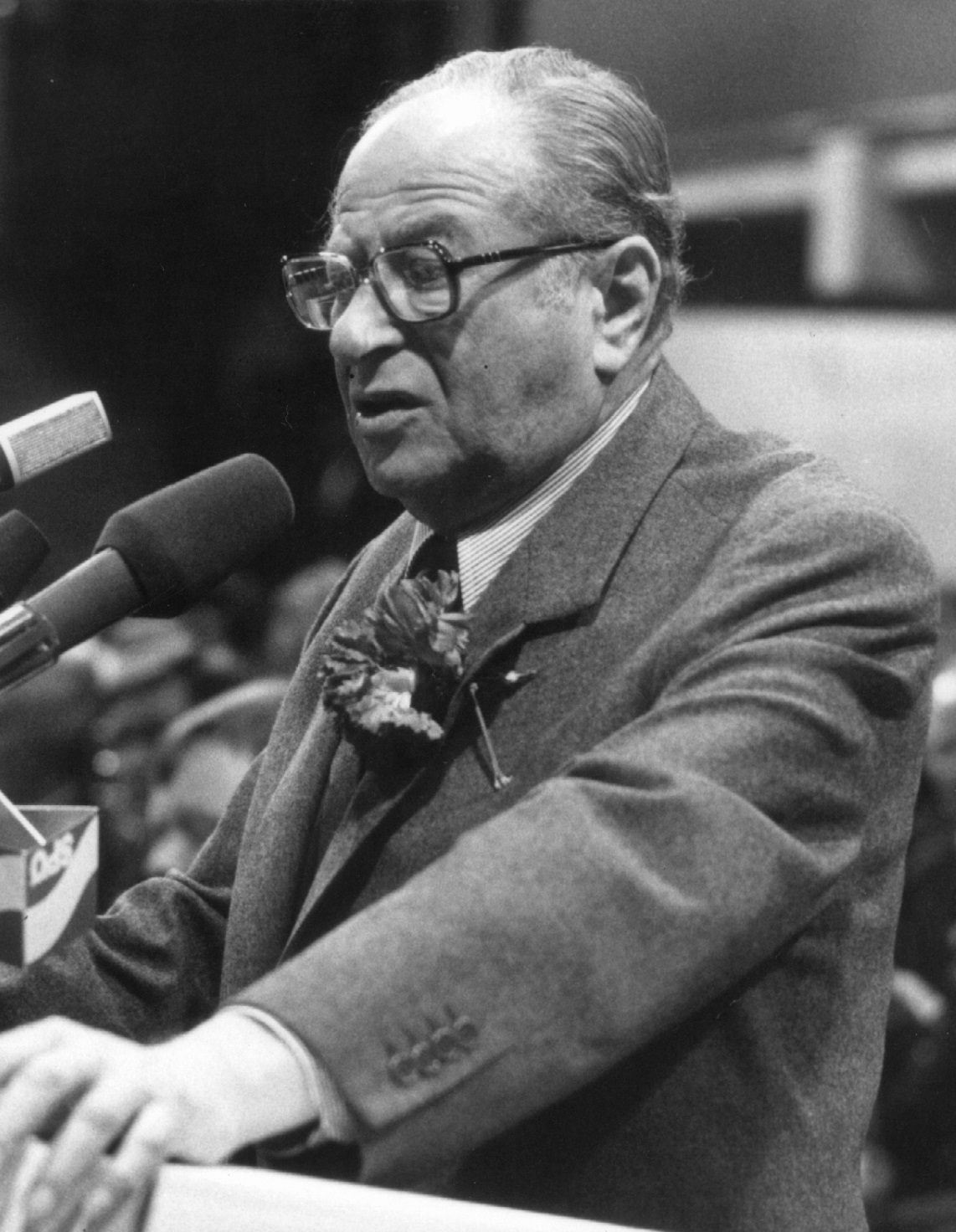
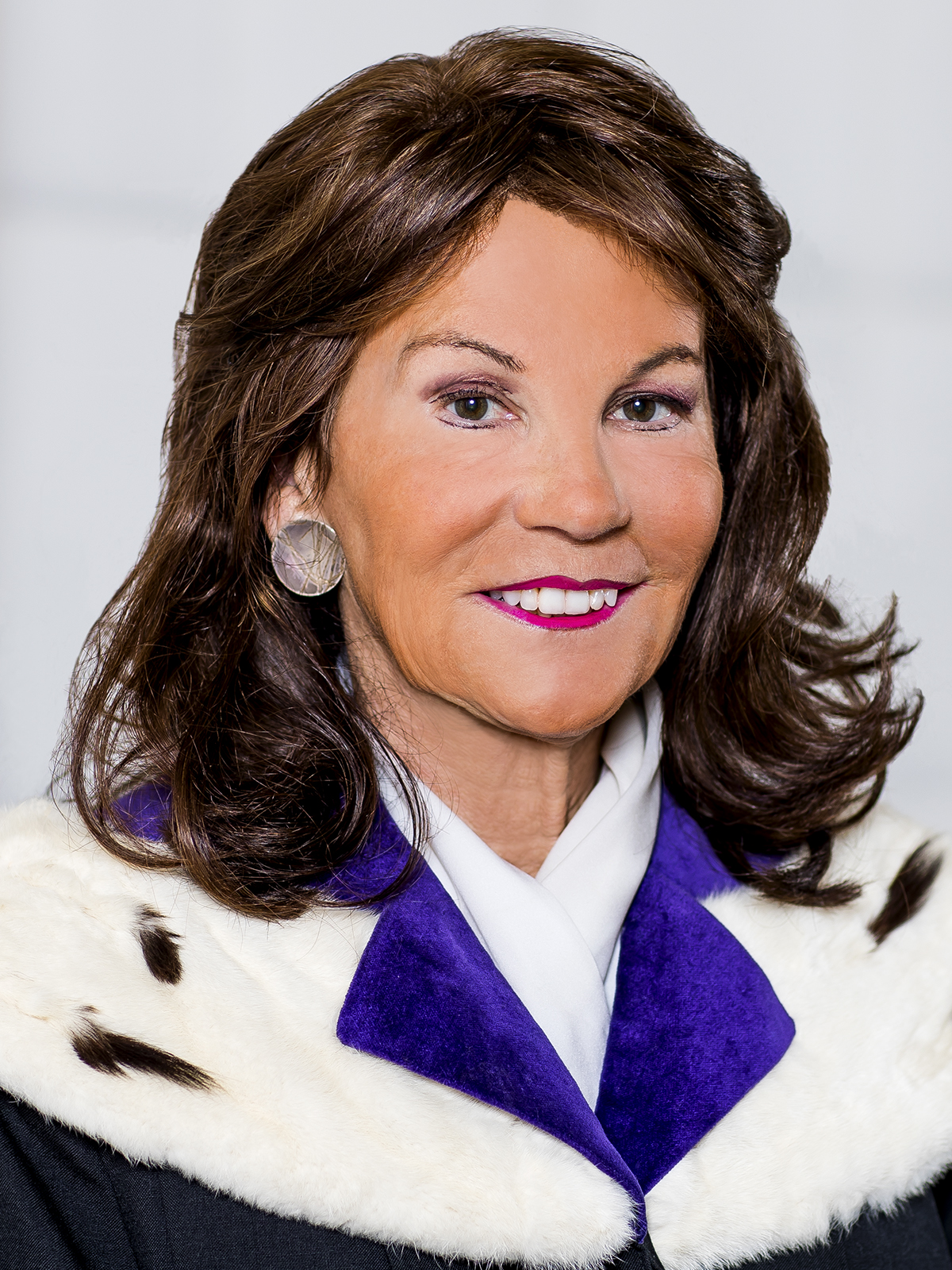
Left to right, top to bottom:
- Renner was the first chancellor of German-Austria, the First Republic, and the Second Republic.
- Dollfuss turned the First Republic into a dictatorship.
- Kreisky is considered perhaps Austria's most successful Socialist leader and also the longest serving Chancellor.
- Bierlein was Austria's first female Chancellor.

The chancellor of Austria is the head of government of Austria, appointed by the president and viewed as the country's de facto chief executive. The chancellor chairs and leads the Cabinet, which also includes the vice-chancellor and the ministers.

Following World War I, the office was established by the Provisional National Assembly on 30 October 1918 and named state chancellor of the Republic of German-Austria, and its first holder, Karl Renner, was appointed by the State Council. After the Allied powers forbade German-Austria to merge with the Weimar Republic, the country formed the federal First Austrian Republic and the office was renamed from state chancellor to federal chancellor. The first federal chancellor was Michael Mayr. Ten chancellors served under the First Republic until Chancellor Engelbert Dollfuss created the authoritarian and dictatorial Federal State of Austria. Following Dollfuss's assassination by Austrian National Socialists, Kurt Schuschnigg succeeded him as chancellor and upheld the dictatorship. Schuschnigg was replaced by Arthur Seyss-Inquart, a Nazi caretaker who held the office for two days, until Austria was annexed into Nazi Germany.

Austria under National Socialism lost its original republican system of government and was administered by Reichsstatthalter Arthur Seyss-Inquart (1938–1939), Reichskommissar Josef Bürckel (1939–1940), and Reichsstatthalter Baldur von Schirach (1940–1945). In 1940, the country was renamed Ostmark, completely lost its autonomy, and became a sub-national division of Nazi Germany. After the liberation of Vienna and the capitulation of Nazi Germany in 1945, Austria restored its republican form of government. However, Austria remained under allied occupation until 1955 and thus the country's sovereignty was ultimately still held by the Allied Control Council.

Since the institution of the republic, the People's Party and the Social Democratic Party have largely dominated Austrian politics; the People's Party (and its predecessor, the Christian Social Party) have led nineteen cabinets and served as a junior partner in eight, while the Social Democratic Party (formerly the Social Democratic Workers' Party) has led eleven and served as a junior partner in five. There have been eight parties that never held the chancellorship but participated in coalition cabinets: the Greater German People's Party in five, the Freedom Party and the Landbund in four, the Fatherland Front in two, and the Greens, the Alliance for the Future, the Communist Party and the NEOS in one.

Following a legislative election or in the case of a vacancy, the president conventionally picks the leader of the largest party in Parliament to serve as chancellor, and appoints the remaining members of the Cabinet based on the chancellor's recommendation. If a sitting chancellor dies, resigns, or is otherwise unable to exercise the powers and duties of the office, the vice-chancellor becomes acting chancellor. If the vice-chancellor is unavailable, the other members of the Cabinet take over in order of seniority.

Bruno Kreisky was the longest-serving chancellor, with more than thirteen years in office, while Arthur Seyss-Inquart was the shortest-serving chancellor, with two days in office, and Walter Breisky was the shortest-serving acting chancellor, with only one day in office.

== Chancellors ==
‡ Acting chancellors

Key to parties
Austrian People's Party / Österreichische Volkspartei (ÖVP): 1891–1934: Christian Social Party / Christlichsoziale Partei (CS); 2017–present: New People's Party / Neue Volkspartei	Social Democratic Party of Austria / Sozialdemokratische Partei Österreichs (SPÖ)	1889–1934: Social Democratic Workers' Party of Austria / Sozialdemokratische Arbeiterpartei Österreichs (SDAPÖ); Freedom Party of Austria / Freiheitliche Partei Österreichs (FPÖ)	Alliance for the Future of Austria / Bündnis Zukunft Österreich (BZÖ) Communist Party of Austria / Kommunistische Partei Österreichs (KPÖ) The Greens / die Grünen Independent / unabhängig

Key to historical parties
1920–1934: Greater German People's Party / Großdeutsche Volkspartei (GDVP)	1922–1934: Rural Federation / Landbund (LBd) 1920–1936: Homeland Guard / Heimwehr	1933–1938: Fatherland Front / Vaterländische Front (VF)	1920–1945: National Socialist German Worker's Party / Nationalsozialistische Deutsche Arbeiterpartei (NSDAP)

No.	Portrait	Name (Birth–Death)	Term of office			Party	Elected	Cabinet coalition	Ref.
No.	Portrait	Name (Birth–Death)	Took office	Left office	Time in office	Party	Elected	Cabinet coalition	Ref.
1		Karl Renner (Note: Renner initially served as State Chancellor of the Republic of German-Austria until 21 October 1919, and thereafter as State Chancellor of the Republic of Austria.) (Note: The chancellor is appointed by the president of Austria. However, since the office of president was only established in 1920, Renner was instead appointed by the State Council.) (1870–1950)	30 October 1918	7 July 1920	1 year, 251 days	SDAPÖ	1919	Renner I–II–III • SDAPÖ • CS • GDVP	
2		Michael Mayr (Note: Office renamed from "State Chancellor" to "Federal Chancellor" on 10 November 1920.) (1864–1922)	7 July 1920	21 June 1921	349 days	CS	1920	Mayr I–II • CS • SDAPÖ	
3		Johannes Schober (1874–1932)	21 June 1921	26 January 1922	344 days	IND	–	Schober I • CS • GDVP • Technocrats	
–		Walter Breisky (1871–1944) ‡	26 January 1922	27 January 1922	1 day	CS	–	Breisky • CS • GDVP	
(3)		Johannes Schober (1874–1932)	27 January 1922	31 May 1922	124 days	IND	–	Schober II • CS • GDVP • Technocrats	
4		Ignaz Seipel (1876–1932)	31 May 1922	20 November 1924	2 years, 173 days	CS	1923	Seipel I–II–III • CS • GDVP • Technocrats	
5		Rudolf Ramek (1881–1941)	20 November 1924	20 October 1926	1 year, 334 days	CS	–	Ramek I–II • CS • GDVP	
(4)		Ignaz Seipel (1876–1932)	20 October 1926	4 May 1929	2 years, 196 days	CS	1927	Seipel IV–V • CS • GDVP • LBd	
6		Ernst Streeruwitz (1874–1952)	4 May 1929	26 September 1929	145 days	CS	–	Streeruwitz • CS • LBd	
(3)		Johannes Schober (1874–1932)	26 September 1929	30 September 1930	1 year, 4 days	IND	–	Schober III • CS	
7		Carl Vaugoin (1873–1949)	30 September 1930	4 December 1930	65 days	CS	–	Vaugoin • CS	
8		Otto Ender (1875–1960)	4 December 1930	20 June 1931	198 days	CS	1930	Ender • CS	
9		Karl Buresch (1878–1936)	20 June 1931	20 May 1932	335 days	CS	–	Buresch I–II • CS • LBd	
10		Engelbert Dollfuss (1892–1934)	20 May 1932	25 July 1934 †	2 years, 66 days	CS	–	Dollfuss I • CS • LBd • Heimwehr; 20 May 1932 – 1 May 1934 Dollfuss II • VF; 1 May 1934 – 25 July 1934	
10		Engelbert Dollfuss (1892–1934)	20 May 1932	25 July 1934 †	2 years, 66 days	VF	–	Dollfuss I • CS • LBd • Heimwehr; 20 May 1932 – 1 May 1934 Dollfuss II • VF; 1 May 1934 – 25 July 1934	
–		Prince; Ernst Rüdiger Starhemberg (1899–1956) ‡	25 July 1934	29 July 1934	4 days	VF	–	Dollfuss II • VF	
11		Kurt Schuschnigg (1897–1977)	29 July 1934	11 March 1938	3 years, 225 days	VF	–	Schuschnigg I–II–III–IV–V • VF	
12		Arthur Seyss-Inquart (1892–1946)	11 March 1938	13 March 1938	2 days	NSDAP	–	Seyss-Inquart • NSDAP	
Austria was part of Nazi Germany from 13 March 1938 to 27 April 1945
(1)		Karl Renner (Note: After the Red Army freed Vienna from the Nazi regime, Renner formed a cabinet under Soviet rule. The cabinet was accepted by the Soviets on 27 April 1945 and recognized by all states of Austria as well as the Allied Control Council in September 1945.) (1870–1950)	27 April 1945	20 December 1945	237 days	SPÖ	–	Renner IV • SPÖ • ÖVP • KPÖ	
13		Leopold Figl (1902–1965)	20 December 1945	2 April 1953	7 years, 103 days	ÖVP	1945	Figl I–II–III • ÖVP • SPÖ	
13		Leopold Figl (1902–1965)	20 December 1945	2 April 1953	7 years, 103 days	ÖVP	1949	Figl I–II–III • ÖVP • SPÖ	
14		Julius Raab (1891–1964)	2 April 1953	11 April 1961	8 years, 9 days	ÖVP	1953	Raab I–II–III–IV • ÖVP • SPÖ	
14		Julius Raab (1891–1964)	2 April 1953	11 April 1961	8 years, 9 days	ÖVP	1956	Raab I–II–III–IV • ÖVP • SPÖ	
14		Julius Raab (1891–1964)	2 April 1953	11 April 1961	8 years, 9 days	ÖVP	1959	Raab I–II–III–IV • ÖVP • SPÖ	
15		Alfons Gorbach (1898–1972)	11 April 1961	2 April 1964	2 years, 357 days	ÖVP	1962	Gorbach I–II • ÖVP • SPÖ	
16		Josef Klaus (1910–2001)	2 April 1964	21 April 1970	6 years, 19 days	ÖVP	–	Klaus I • ÖVP • SPÖ	
16		Josef Klaus (1910–2001)	2 April 1964	21 April 1970	6 years, 19 days	ÖVP	1966	Klaus II • ÖVP	
17		Bruno Kreisky (1911–1990)	21 April 1970	24 May 1983	13 years, 33 days	SPÖ	1970	Kreisky I–II–III–IV • SPÖ	
17		Bruno Kreisky (1911–1990)	21 April 1970	24 May 1983	13 years, 33 days	SPÖ	1971	Kreisky I–II–III–IV • SPÖ	
17		Bruno Kreisky (1911–1990)	21 April 1970	24 May 1983	13 years, 33 days	SPÖ	1975	Kreisky I–II–III–IV • SPÖ	
17		Bruno Kreisky (1911–1990)	21 April 1970	24 May 1983	13 years, 33 days	SPÖ	1979	Kreisky I–II–III–IV • SPÖ	
18		Fred Sinowatz (1929–2008)	24 May 1983	16 June 1986	3 years, 23 days	SPÖ	1983	Sinowatz • SPÖ • FPÖ	
19		Franz Vranitzky (born 1937)	16 June 1986	28 January 1997	10 years, 226 days	SPÖ	1986	Vranitzky I–II • SPÖ • FPÖ	
19		Franz Vranitzky (born 1937)	16 June 1986	28 January 1997	10 years, 226 days	SPÖ	1990	Vranitzky III–IV–V • SPÖ • ÖVP	
19		Franz Vranitzky (born 1937)	16 June 1986	28 January 1997	10 years, 226 days	SPÖ	1994	Vranitzky III–IV–V • SPÖ • ÖVP	
19		Franz Vranitzky (born 1937)	16 June 1986	28 January 1997	10 years, 226 days	SPÖ	1995	Vranitzky III–IV–V • SPÖ • ÖVP	
20		Viktor Klima (born 1947)	28 January 1997	4 February 2000	3 years, 7 days	SPÖ	–	Klima • SPÖ • ÖVP	
21		Wolfgang Schüssel (born 1945)	4 February 2000	11 January 2007	6 years, 341 days	ÖVP	1999	Schüssel I • ÖVP • FPÖ; 4 February 2000 – 3 April 2005 Schüssel II • ÖVP • BZÖ; 3 April 2005 – 11 January 2007	
21		Wolfgang Schüssel (born 1945)	4 February 2000	11 January 2007	6 years, 341 days	ÖVP	2002	Schüssel I • ÖVP • FPÖ; 4 February 2000 – 3 April 2005 Schüssel II • ÖVP • BZÖ; 3 April 2005 – 11 January 2007	
22		Alfred Gusenbauer (born 1960)	11 January 2007	2 December 2008	1 year, 326 days	SPÖ	2006	Gusenbauer • SPÖ • ÖVP	
23		Werner Faymann (born 1960)	2 December 2008	9 May 2016	7 years, 159 days	SPÖ	2008	Faymann I–II • SPÖ • ÖVP	
23		Werner Faymann (born 1960)	2 December 2008	9 May 2016	7 years, 159 days	SPÖ	2013	Faymann I–II • SPÖ • ÖVP	
–		Reinhold Mitterlehner (born 1955) ‡	9 May 2016	17 May 2016	8 days	ÖVP	–	Faymann II • SPÖ • ÖVP	
24		Christian Kern (born 1966)	17 May 2016	18 December 2017	1 year, 215 days	SPÖ	–	Kern • SPÖ • ÖVP	
25		Sebastian Kurz (born 1986)	18 December 2017	28 May 2019	1 year, 161 days	ÖVP	2017	Kurz I • ÖVP • FPÖ; 18 December 2017 – 22 May 2019 • ÖVP; 22 May 2019 – 28 May 2019	
–		Hartwig Löger (born 1965) ‡	28 May 2019	3 June 2019	6 days	ÖVP	–	Kurz I • ÖVP	
26		Brigitte Bierlein (1949–2024)	3 June 2019	7 January 2020	218 days	IND	–	Bierlein • Technocrats	
(25)		Sebastian Kurz (born 1986)	7 January 2020	11 October 2021	1 year, 277 days	ÖVP	2019	Kurz II • ÖVP • Greens	
27		Alexander Schallenberg (born 1969)	11 October 2021	6 December 2021	56 days	ÖVP	–	Schallenberg • ÖVP • Greens	
28		Karl Nehammer (born 1972)	6 December 2021	10 January 2025	3 years, 35 days	ÖVP	–	Nehammer • ÖVP • Greens	
–		Alexander Schallenberg (born 1969) ‡	10 January 2025	3 March 2025	52 days	ÖVP	–	Nehammer • ÖVP • Greens	
29		Christian Stocker (born 1960)	3 March 2025	Incumbent	1 year, 245 days	ÖVP	2024	Stocker • ÖVP • SPÖ • NEOS	

== Longest-serving chancellors ==
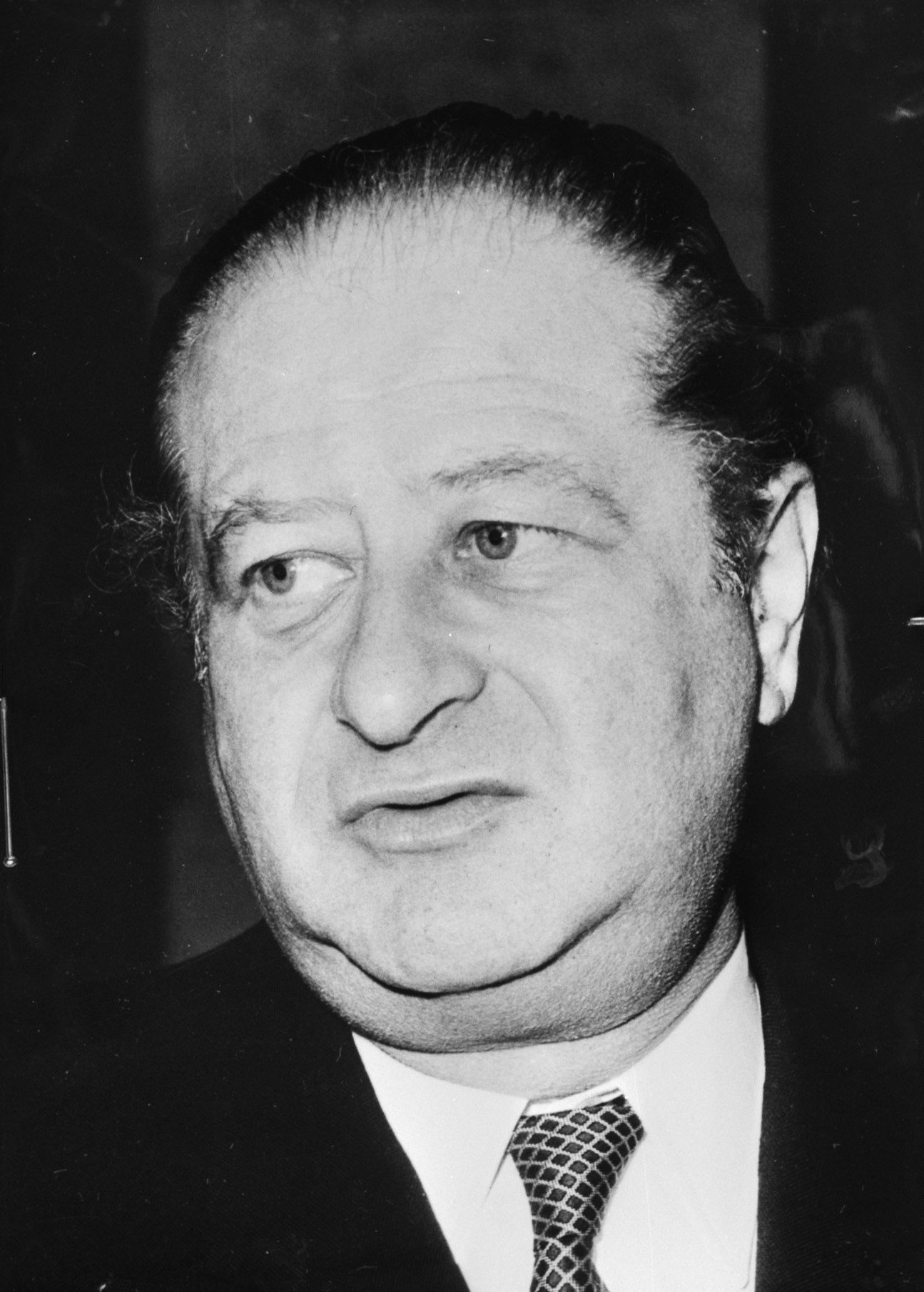
Bruno Kreisky, longest-serving chancellor (13 years)

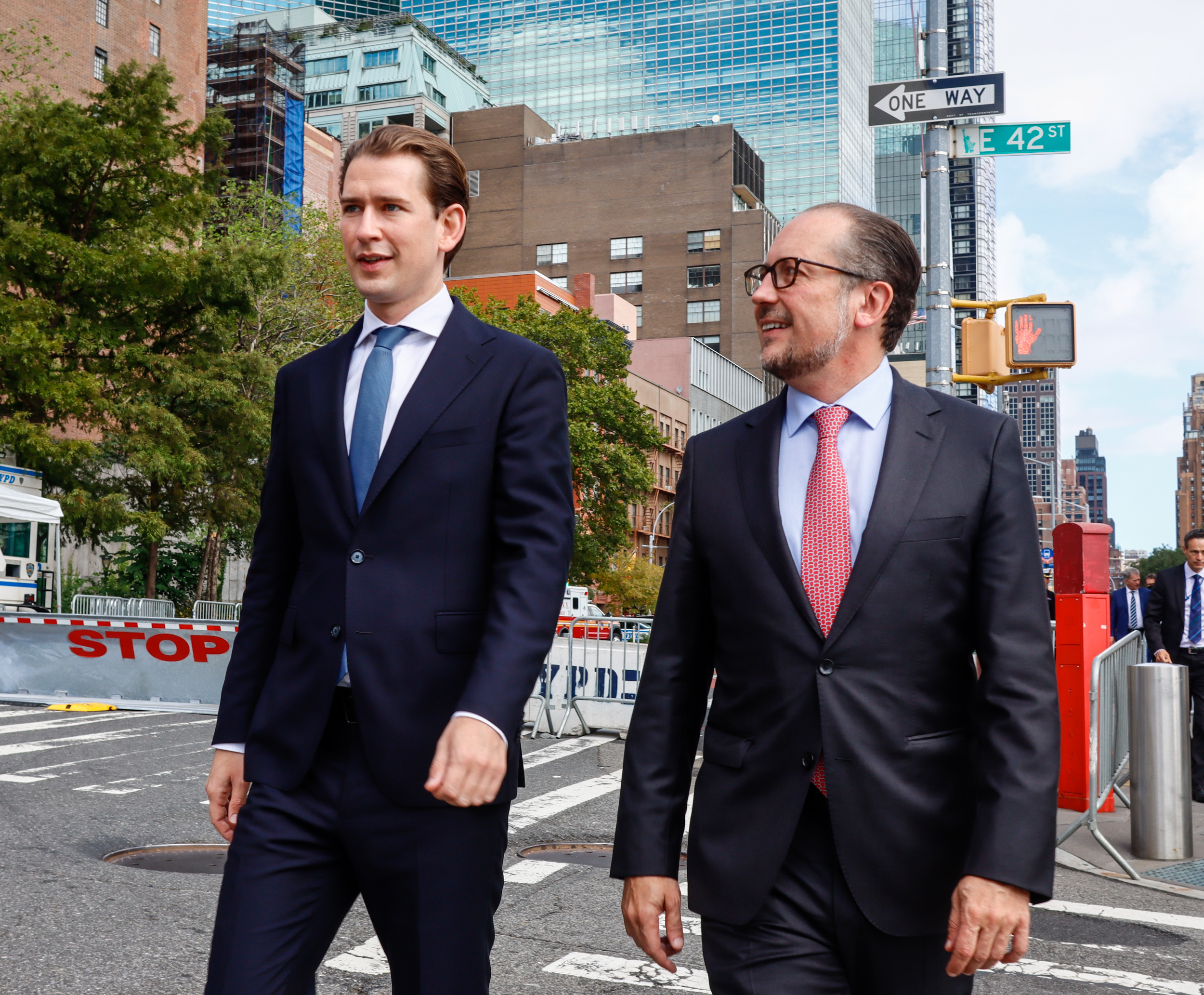
Sebastian Kurz, youngest chancellor at appointment (31 years) & Alexander Schallenberg the chancellor with the shortest tenure

The following table lists all chancellors of the Second Republic (since 1945) ranked by their length of tenure, with the incumbent chancellor's tenure automatically updating daily.

Rank	Chancellor	Length of tenure(s)	Timespan(s)	Party
1	Bruno Kreisky	13 years, 33 days	1970–1983	SPÖ
2	Franz Vranitzky	10 years, 226 days	1986–1997	SPÖ
3	Julius Raab	8 years, 9 days	1953–1961	ÖVP
4	Werner Faymann	7 years, 159 days	2008–2016	SPÖ
5	Leopold Figl	7 years, 103 days	1945–1953	ÖVP
6	Wolfgang Schüssel	6 years, 341 days	2000–2007	ÖVP
7	Josef Klaus	6 years, 19 days	1964–1970	ÖVP
8	Sebastian Kurz	3 years, 75 days 1 year, 161 days + 1 year, 277 days	2017–2019; 2020–2021	ÖVP
9	Karl Nehammer	3 years, 35 days	2021–2025	ÖVP
10	Fred Sinowatz	3 years, 23 days	1983–1986	SPÖ
11	Viktor Klima	3 years, 7 days	1997–2000	SPÖ
12	Alfons Gorbach	2 years, 357 days	1961–1964	ÖVP
13	Alfred Gusenbauer	1 year, 326 days	2007–2008	SPÖ
14	Christian Kern	1 year, 215 days	2016–2017	SPÖ
15	Christian Stocker	1 year, 245 days	2025–present	ÖVP
16	Karl Renner	237 days	1945	SPÖ
17	Brigitte Bierlein	218 days	2019–2020	IND
18	Alexander Schallenberg	56 days	2021	ÖVP

== Chancellors by party ==
The following table summarizes chancellors of the Second Republic grouped by political party.

Party	Total time in office	Number of chancellors	Chancellors
SPÖ; Social Democratic Party	**41 years, 130 days**	8	Karl Renner, Bruno Kreisky, Fred Sinowatz, Franz Vranitzky, Viktor Klima, Alfred Gusenbauer, Werner Faymann, Christian Kern
**ÖVP; Austrian People's Party**	**39 years, 146 days (+ ongoing, incl. Stocker)**	9	Leopold Figl, Julius Raab, Alfons Gorbach, Josef Klaus, Wolfgang Schüssel, Sebastian Kurz, Alexander Schallenberg, Karl Nehammer, **Christian Stocker**
IND; Independent	**218 days**	1	Brigitte Bierlein

Notes:

- Green indicates the party of the current incumbent chancellor
- Bold name indicates the current incumbent chancellor
- ÖVP total time includes the ongoing tenure of Christian Stocker
- If Stocker remains chancellor until October 2028, the ÖVP will surpass the SPÖ in total time in office

== Age-related statistics ==
The following table shows age-related data for all chancellors of the Second Republic, with living chancellors' ages automatically updating.

Chancellor	Born	Age at start of chancellorship	Age at end of chancellorship	Post-chancellorship timespan	Died	Lifespan
Karl Renner	14 December 1870	74 years, 134 days 27 April 1945	75 years, 6 days 20 December 1945	5 years, 11 days	31 December 1950	80 years, 17 days
Leopold Figl	2 October 1902	43 years, 79 days 20 December 1945	50 years, 182 days 2 April 1953	12 years, 37 days	9 May 1965	62 years, 219 days
Julius Raab	29 November 1891	61 years, 124 days 2 April 1953	69 years, 133 days 11 April 1961	2 years, 272 days	8 January 1964	72 years, 40 days
Alfons Gorbach	2 September 1898	62 years, 221 days 11 April 1961	65 years, 213 days 2 April 1964	8 years, 120 days	31 July 1972	73 years, 333 days
Josef Klaus	15 August 1910	53 years, 231 days 2 April 1964	59 years, 249 days 21 April 1970	31 years, 95 days	25 July 2001	90 years, 344 days
Bruno Kreisky	22 January 1911	59 years, 89 days 21 April 1970	72 years, 122 days 24 May 1983	7 years, 66 days	29 July 1990	79 years, 188 days
Fred Sinowatz	5 February 1929	54 years, 108 days 24 May 1983	57 years, 131 days 16 June 1986	22 years, 56 days	11 August 2008	79 years, 188 days
Franz Vranitzky	4 October 1937	48 years, 255 days 16 June 1986	59 years, 116 days 28 January 1997	29 years, 279 days	—	89 years, 30 days
Viktor Klima	4 June 1947	49 years, 238 days 28 January 1997	52 years, 245 days 4 February 2000	26 years, 272 days	—	79 years, 152 days
Wolfgang Schüssel	7 June 1945	54 years, 242 days 4 February 2000	61 years, 218 days 11 January 2007	19 years, 296 days	—	81 years, 149 days
Alfred Gusenbauer	8 February 1960	46 years, 337 days 11 January 2007	48 years, 298 days 2 December 2008	17 years, 336 days	—	66 years, 268 days
Werner Faymann	4 May 1960	48 years, 212 days 2 December 2008	56 years, 5 days 9 May 2016	10 years, 178 days	—	66 years, 183 days
Christian Kern	4 January 1966	50 years, 134 days 17 May 2016	51 years, 348 days 18 December 2017	8 years, 320 days	—	60 years, 303 days
Sebastian Kurz (1st term)	27 August 1986	31 years, 113 days 18 December 2017	32 years, 274 days 28 May 2019	224 days	—	40 years, 68 days
Brigitte Bierlein	25 June 1949	69 years, 343 days 3 June 2019	70 years, 196 days 7 January 2020	4 years, 148 days	3 June 2024	74 years, 344 days
Sebastian Kurz (2nd term)	27 August 1986	33 years, 133 days 7 January 2020	35 years, 45 days 11 October 2021	5 years, 23 days	—	40 years, 68 days
Alexander Schallenberg	20 June 1969	52 years, 113 days 11 October 2021	52 years, 169 days 6 December 2021	4 years, 332 days	—	57 years, 136 days
Karl Nehammer	18 October 1972	49 years, 49 days 6 December 2021	52 years, 84 days 10 January 2025	1 year, 297 days	—	54 years, 16 days
Christian Stocker	20 March 1960	64 years, 348 days 3 March 2025	Incumbent			66 years, 228 days

Notes:

- Light green indicates living former chancellors
- Green indicates the current incumbent chancellor
- Sebastian Kurz served two non-consecutive terms; both are shown separately
- Living chancellors' post-chancellorship timespan and lifespan automatically update daily

== Graphical representation ==
This is a graphical lifespan timeline of the Chancellors of Austria since 1945. They are listed in order of first assuming office.

The following chart shows chancellors by their age (living chancellors in green), with the years of their time in office in color.

== See also ==
- History of Austria
- Politics of Austria
- Elections in Austria
- President of Austria
  - List of presidents of Austria
- Vice-Chancellor of Austria
- List of political parties in Austria
