= Breisky government =

- Government of Austria
- Date formed: January 26, 1922
- Date dissolved: January 27, 1922

People and organisations
- Chancellor of Austria: Walter Breisky
- No. of ministers: 7
- Member parties: Christian Social Party

History
- Election: 1920
- Predecessor: Schober I
- Successor: Schober II

The Breisky government (German: Regierung Breisky) was a caretaker cabinet in office in Austria from midday of January 26 to midday of January 27, 1922. The government came to be when Chancellor Johannes Schober stepped down in order to put a formal end to a coalition agreement between Christian Social Party and Greater German People's Party that had gradually broken down over the course of the preceding weeks. President Michael Hainisch installed Walter Breisky, the vice chancellor in Schober's cabinet, as Schober's interim successor. Within less than twenty-four hours, the quarreling coalition partners agreed that no credible alternative to Schober was available, revived their coalition agreement, and convinced Schober to take the reins again.

== Background ==
The first Schober government, sworn in on June 21, 1921, was a coalition government supported by the Christian Social Party and the Greater German People's Party. Although the coalition was unambiguously right of center, the government itself was supposed to be nonpartisan – a so-called "cabinet of civil servants" ("Beamtenkabinett") loyal to the country rather than to any particular faction. Eight of its eleven members, including the chancellor himself, were political independents and career administrators in the employ of the republic.

On December 16, 1921, Chancellor Schober and President Hainisch signed the Treaty of Lana, an agreement of mutual understanding and friendship between Austria and Czechoslovakia. In particular, Austria reconfirmed to its neighbor to the north that it would faithfully abide by the Treaty of Saint-Germain and would neither seek unification with Germany nor attempt to restore the Habsburgs to power. In return, Czechoslovakia promised a substantial loan to the struggling, cash-strapped rump state. The treaty would also generally improve Austria's international standing and make it easier for Austria to secure additional loans from other countries.

The Christian Socials were in favor of the treaty, but their remaining coalition partner, the Greater German People's Party, was vehemently opposed. Ardently pan-German, the People's Party had been hoping that Austria would, sooner or later, defy the Treaty of Saint-Germain and would seek accession to the German Reich. The party had also been hoping that the unification of all Germans would extend to the Sudeten Germans, the German-speaking former Habsburg subjects living in what used to be Bohemia. Schober, whom the party had considered an ally, was renouncing both these goals.

In the final days of December 1921, the People's Party staged protest rallies against the treaty all over the country. On January 16, 1922, it also withdrew its representative from Schober's cabinet. As long as Schober himself remained office, however, the People's Party was still bound by the original coalition agreement. The agreement required the party to vote in support of government bills in the National Council, and one of the government bills on the table in January 1922 was the ratification of the Treaty of Lana. One January 26, hoping to appease the People's Party by releasing it from its contractual obligation, Schober stepped down.

Austria was a straightforward parliamentary republic in 1922. Under normal circumstances, the chancellor was appointed, together with the vice chancellor and the rest of the cabinet, by the National Council. The vice chancellor stood in for the chancellor if the chancellor was unavailable temporarily, but there was no provision stipulating that the vice chancellor succeeded the chancellor, even in an acting capacity, if the chancellor left office permanently. What the constitution specified instead was that, if a cabinet member left office, the president would pick an interim successor "to charge with continuance of administration" ("mit der Fortführung der Verwaltung ... betrauen") until the National Council could elect a permanent replacement. In theory, the president could have appointed any of the remaining cabinet members or even a senior civil servant to replace a resigning chancellor, but the obvious, unadventurous choice would still have been the vice chancellor. The vice chancellor in the first Schober government was Walter Breisky. President Michael Hainisch did the expected and made Breisky the caretaker head of government.

== Composition ==
The Breisky government consisted of Breisky himself and the seven remaining other Schober ministers.

The Schober government originally included only three members with formal party affiliations: Walter Breisky and Carl Vaugoin as representatives of the Christian Socials, Leopold Waber as the sole representative of the Greater German People's Party. The other eight of its eleven members were independents. Vaugoin stepped down in October 1921; his replacement was an independent too. When Waber departed the cabinet over the Treaty of Lana and Schober's resignation subsequently dissolved the coalition, the slightly bizarre result was a government supported by no parliamentary faction other than the Christian Socials yet still containing exactly one actual Christian Social Party member.

Another peculiarity was that Breisky filled no fewer than four separate positions. Waber had been the head of the Ministry of Education and the Interior; following Waber's resignation, Schober was appointed acting minister in his stead. Schober had also served, however, as the minister – technically acting minister – in charge of the Ministry of Foreign Affairs. Following Schober's own resignation, both these roles fell to Breisky. In addition to his position as the chancellor and his two acting minister posts, Breisky technically also still held the office of vice chancellor.

Department	Office	Officeholder	Party
Chancellery	Acting Chancellor	Walter Breisky	CS
Chancellery	Vice chancellor	Walter Breisky	CS
Ministry of Education and the Interior	Acting minister	Walter Breisky	CS
Ministry of Justice	Minister	Rudolf Paltauf	none
Ministry of Finance	Minister	Alfred Gürtler	none
Ministry of Agriculture and Forestry	Minister	Leopold Hennet	none
Ministry of Commerce, Industry and Construction	Minister	Alfred Grünberger	none
Ministry of Social Affairs	Minister	Franz Pauer	none
Ministry of Foreign Affairs	Acting minister	Walter Breisky	CS
Ministry of the Army	Minister	Josef Wächter	none
Ministry of Nutrition of the Population	Acting minister	Alfred Grünberger	none
Ministry of Transport	Minister	Walter Rodler	none

== Replacement ==
Within hours of Schober's resignation, the Treaty of Lana was ratified with the votes of Christian Socials and Social Democrats. The Greater German People's Party, released from the coalition agreement and thus free to vote against the treaty, did. With the treaty ratified and the People's Party superficially placated, Schober's resignation had served its purpose. Behind the scenes, Christian Social representatives, and possibly politicians of other parties as well, were already lobbying Schober to return; it was widely felt that there simply was no alternative. Schober let himself be persuaded and was made the head of the second Schober government the very next day, January 27. The People's Party did not return its representative to Schober's cabinet but was ready to recommence support for Schober in the legislature, at least for the time being. The Breisky government had been in office for just about twenty-four hours.

Breisky returned to his previous roles as vice chancellor and state secretary of education.
