= Walter Breisky =

Austrian jurist and politician (1871–1944)

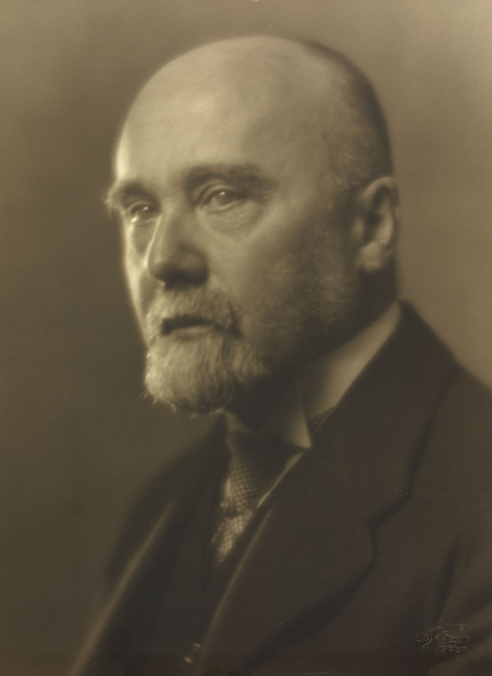

Acting Chancellor of Austria
- In office 26 January 1922 – 27 January 1922
- President: Michael Hainisch
- Vice-Chancellor: Himself
- Preceded by: Johannes Schober
- Succeeded by: Johannes Schober

Vice-Chancellor of Austria
- In office 30 November 1920 – 31 May 1922
- Chancellor: Michael Mayr; Johann Schober; Himself (acting)
- Preceded by: Eduard Heinl
- Succeeded by: Felix Frank

Minister of the Interior
- In office 30 November 1920 – 31 May 1922
- Preceded by: Egon Glanz
- Succeeded by: Rudolf Ramek

Personal details
- Born: 8 July 1871 Bern, Switzerland
- Died: 25 September 1944 (aged 73) Klosterneuburg, Nazi Germany
- Party: Christian Social Party
- Parents: August Breisky (father); Pauline Breisky (mother)
- Education: University of Vienna

Walter Breisky (8 July 1871 – 25 September 1944) was an Austrian jurist, civil servant, and politician. Nominated by the Christian Social Party, Breisky served as minister of education and the interior from July to November 1920, as the vice chancellor and state secretary of education from November 1920 to May 1922. Together with his Social Democratic deputy, Otto Glöckel, Breisky initiated sweeping reforms of Austria's education system. In January 1922, Breisky became the caretaker chancellor of Austria for a single day.

== Early life ==
Walter Breisky was born on 8 July 1871 in Bern, Switzerland. He was the second son of August Breisky and Pauline Breisky, née von Less. Both parents were of Bohemian descent. The family was living in Switzerland at the time of Breisky's birth because his father, a noted physician, had accepted a professorship of gynecology at the University of Bern in 1867. When August Breisky was invited to assume a chair at the University of Prague in 1874, the family moved back home.

In Prague, Breisky attended elementary school and received the first four years of his gymnasium education. In 1886, his father was offered a position with the Second Gynecological Clinic of the University of Vienna. Breisky thus completed his secondary education in the imperial capital, graduating from the high-profile Gymnasium Wasagasse in 1890. Shortly before Breisky could finish school, his father died, a loss that appears to have hit teenaged Breisky hard. Since Breisky was not yet of age, his uncle, Rudolf Baron Breisky, became his legal guardian and eventually adopted him. Baron Breisky was a senior official in the Ministry of the Interior; he had served as the head of the ministry's presidium for 25 years and was one of the closest collaborators of Interior Minister Eduard Taaffe. It is likely that Baron Breisky encouraged his ward to pursue a career in the imperial bureaucracy. Austrian diplomat Michael Breisky is his grandnephew.

Breisky's grades appeared to suggest that his talents lay more in the humanities than in any technical fields. Breisky enrolled at the University of Vienna to study law and political science. He graduated with distinction in 1895.

== Career ==
=== Civil servant ===
Within ten days of graduating from university, Breisky secured employment as an apprentice clerk (Amtspraktikant) in the governor's office (Statthalterei) of the Archduchy of Lower Austria. It is unlikely that Breisky owed his swift admission into the civil service to his uncle's patronage. Walter Breisky was chosen for the position by Minister-President Count Erich Kielmansegg, who intensely disliked Rudolf Baron Breisky for the latter's personality; in Kielmansegg's autobiography, Baron Breisky would be described as a "supercilious fossil". In spite of the enmity between guardian and superior, Breisky rose through the ranks with ease and remarkable speed. In 1895, he was assigned to the Korneuburg precinct administration. Three years later, he was promoted from apprentice clerk to regular clerk (Konzipist) and appointed to the executive committee of the state bureaucracy. His performance reviews were consistently glowing.

On 1 January 1900, Breisky was reassigned to the Ministry of Education. Employment in the ministerial bureaucracy was significantly more prestigious than employment in a state administration, and Breisky was still only 28 years old, unusually young for advancement to the ministry. The step up in rank was all the more remarkable as Breisky was a Protestant, a serious handicap in the Habsburg bureaucracy in general and in the Ministry of Education in particular. In 1905, the Ministry tried to get rid of the religious outsider by offering him to fill a vacancy on the Evangelical Church Council. The move would have advanced Breisky by an additional two steps in rank. Breisky declined.

Breisky's refusal to accept the sinecure did no permanent damage to his career. In April 1907, Breisky was appointed to the ministry's presidium. In February 1908, he was promoted to ministerial secretary (Ministerialsekretär); he subsequently became a noted collaborator of Minister-President Baron Max Wladimir von Beck. The two men grew very close, to the point of spending extended holidays together. In 1909, Breisky received the job title of departmental advisor (Sektionsrat). In 1913, he was made a ministerial advisor (Ministerialrat).

The collapse of the Austro-Hungarian Empire at the end of World War I was a serious personal blow to Breisky, who was 47 years old now and had spent his entire working life as a loyal servant of the Habsburg Monarchy. In spite of his despondency, Breisky remained at his post. The emerging Republic of German-Austria knew to appreciate his experience. In May 1919, Breisky was made a department director (Sektionschef) in the Chancellery (Staatskanzlei), personal bureau of Chancellor Karl Renner and heart of the rump state's executive apparatus. Once again, Breisky became a close confidant and trusted lieutenant of the chief executive. Renner instructed his staff that every document addressed to Renner should also be made available to Breisky, preferably before Renner himself had seen it.

=== Minister of education ===
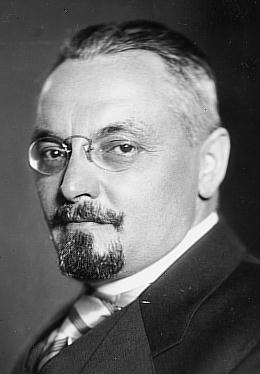
Otto Glöckel, a Social Democrat and energetic reformer, was Breisky's deputy during his first few months as minister of education.

Breisky was no ideologue and felt no instinctive allegiance to any of the republic's three dominant political camps. A scion of the upper class and socially conservative by temperament, Breisky was certainly no Social Democrat, his harmonious working relationship with Renner nonwithstanding. The Christian Social camp shared his traditionalism but was also explicitly Catholic. His Evangelical faith would have pointed him to the German Nationalists, also socially conservative. A descendant of a family of Habsburg civil servants and a lifelong Habsburg civil servant himself, however, would not have felt drawn to a camp that defined itself as pan-German and as Antisemitic besides. Even so, Breisky eventually entered formal politics. In July 1920, the Social Democratic Party, Christian Social Party, and Greater German People's Party agreed to form a national unity government to manage the transition from provisional to permanent constitution that was in progress at the time. The Christian Socials offered to make Breisky head of the Ministry of Education. Breisky accepted. On 7 July Breisky was sworn in as a state secretary – the term for "minister" in the provisional constitution – of education in the first Mayr government.

The deputy state secretary of education under both Renner and Mayr was Otto Glöckel, a Social Democrat and committed progressive. Glöckel was driving an ambitious program of education reform that included both structural reorganization and a drastic changes to the system's pedagogical approach. Traditionally, children were sorted into different educational tracks after graduating from elementary school at age ten. In theory, the sorting criteria were scholastic aptitude and talent profile; in practice, students were sorted by socioeconomic background. Glöckel meant to help break down class barriers through merging the different types of middle schools, thus delaying the sorting for another four years. In terms of style, education was to focus on inspiring self-reliance and independent thought as opposed to rote learning.

Glöckel's new superior, no revolutionary but open to new ideas, halted some of Glöckel's reforms but happily embraced others, then added reform ideas of his own. He promoted access to education for girls, worked to improve teacher training, professionalized the textbook approbation process, overhauled the school physicians' service, and modernized curricula. He also worked to improve access to education, and to the arts and humanities in particular, for children in rural regions. While Vienna was a vibrant metropolis and a global cultural center for music and theater, large parts of the rest of Austria were a backwater. Breisky took the initiative in organizing concerts and theatrical performances for the sons and daughters of the hinterland.

When the Social Democrats left the unity government on 22 October, the post of minister of defense – now actually called "minister" because the new constitution had entered into force – became vacant. Breisky was appointed acting minister. When the second Mayr government took office on 20 November, Breisky became vice chancellor. The Ministry of Education had been merged into the Ministry of the Interior, and the combined ministry was led not by Breisky but by Egon Glanz. Breisky, however, was made the state secretary – the term now meant "deputy minister" – in charge of education affairs, retaining his previous portfolio and continuing his reform work. When Glanz resigned on 7 April 1921 Breisky was promoted to acting minister. On 21 June the first Schober government was inaugurated; this cabinet too included Breisky as both vice chancellor and state secretary of education.

=== Chancellor for a day ===
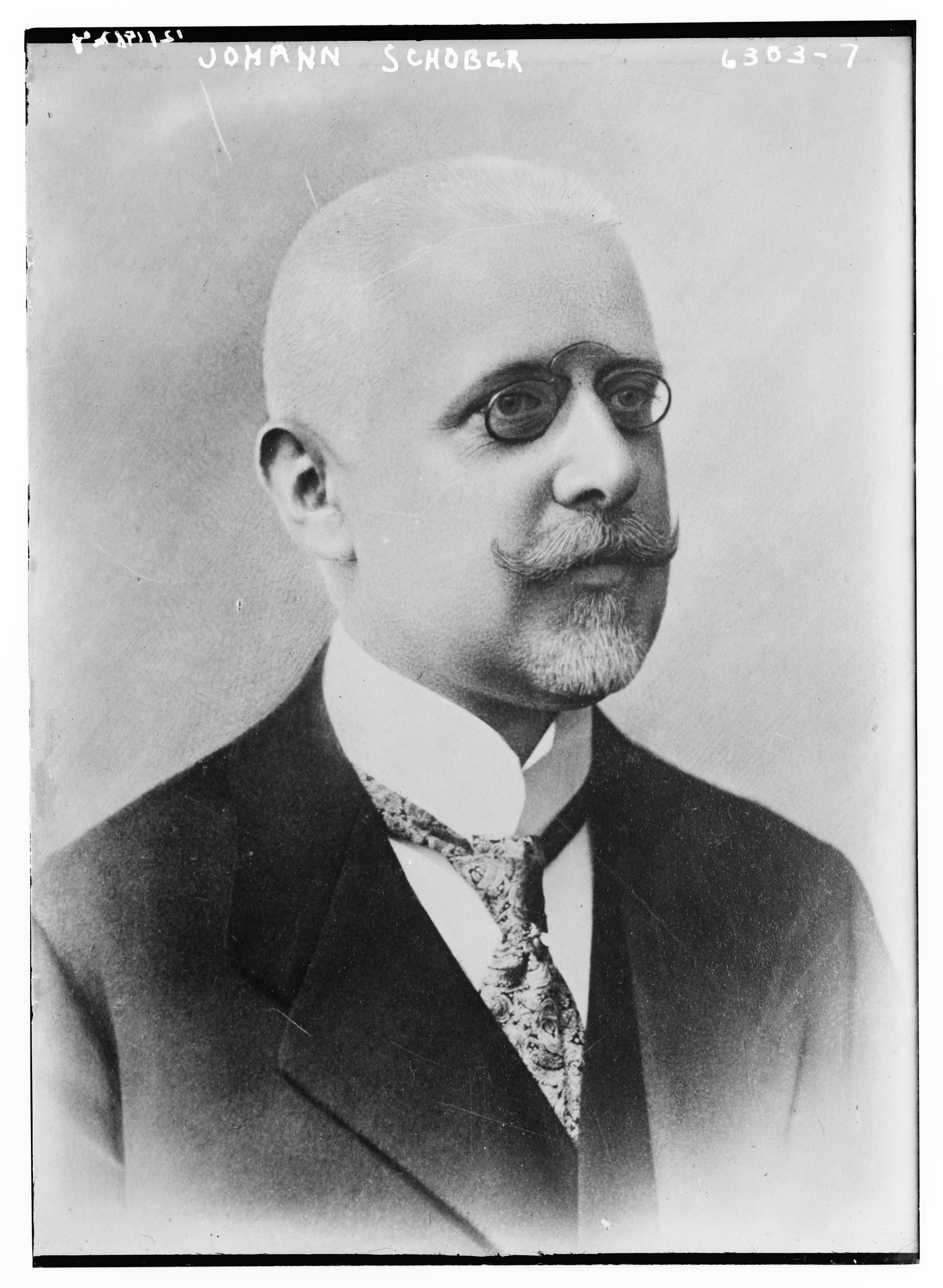
Johannes Schober, Breisky's predecessor and successor as the chancellor of Austria

On 16 December 1921 Chancellor Schober and President Hainisch signed the Treaty of Lana, an agreement of mutual understanding and friendship between Austria and Czechoslovakia. In particular, Austria reconfirmed to its neighbor to the north that it would faithfully abide by the Treaty of Saint-Germain and would neither seek unification with Germany nor attempt to restore the Habsburg dynasty to power. In return, Czechoslovakia promised a substantial loan to the struggling, cash-strapped rump state. The treaty would also generally improve Austria's international standing and make it easier for Austria to secure additional loans from other countries.

The Christian Socials were in favor of the treaty, but their remaining coalition partner, the Greater German People's Party, was vehemently opposed. Ardently pan-German, the People's Party had been hoping that Austria would, sooner or later, defy the Treaty of Saint-Germain and would seek accession to the German Reich. The party had also been hoping that the unification of all Germans would extend to the Sudeten Germans, the German-speaking former Habsburg subjects living in what used to be Bohemia. Schober, whom the party had considered an ally, was renouncing both these goals.

In the final days of December 1921, the People's Party staged protest rallies against the treaty all over the country. On 16 January 1922, it also withdrew its representative from Schober's cabinet. As long as Schober himself remained in office, however, the People's Party was still bound by the original coalition agreement. The agreement required the party to vote in support of government bills in the National Council, and one of the government bills on the table in January 1922 was the ratification of the Treaty of Lana. On 26 January, hoping to appease the People's Party by releasing it from its contractual obligation, Schober stepped down. Schober's resignation did not elevate Breisky to the chancellorship automatically, but Hainisch instantaneously appointed him caretaker head of government. The Treaty of Lana was ratified with the votes of Christian Socials and Social Democrats, while the People's Party voted against.

Behind the scenes, Christian Social representatives, and possibly politicians of other parties as well, were lobbying Schober to return; it was widely felt that there simply was no alternative. Schober let himself be persuaded. On 27 January he was elected chancellor a second time. The People's Party did not return its representative to Schober's cabinet but was ready to recommence support for Schober in the National Council. The Breisky government had been in office for just about twenty-four hours.

Breisky resumed his roles as vice chancellor and state secretary of education.

=== Chief statistician ===
In May 1922, just four months later, Schober was forced to resign again. Ignaz Seipel, Schober's successor, had no use for Breisky in his cabinet. Breisky returned to his old position as the executive department director (leitender Sektionschef) in the Chancellery, where he seems to have served Seipel as diligently as he used to serve Renner. Seipel showed himself grateful. On 21 February 1923, Breisky was made the president of the Austrian Statistics Office. Austria's economic situation was still troubled and, in fact, worsening. The administrators in charge of economic policy were hampered by lack of reliable information. It was unclear how many inhabitants the country had, how many of them were employed, how many businesses there were, and how much they produced. The agency Breisky took over was massively understaffed and poorly organized. Breisky, whose appointment was originally ridiculed for his complete lack of any relevant training or experience, proved himself capable and energetic. Breisky turned the Statistics Office around, then took the initiative in creating the Austrian Institute of Economic Research (Österreichisches Institut für Konjunkturforschung at the time), thus making sure that the agency would be kept on its toes by competition from a think tank of independent scholars.

== Later years ==
Throughout his life, Breisky had been suffering from poor eyesight. His far-sightedness and astigmatism had already been bad enough to get him declared permanently unfit for military service in 1894, and they had been worsening since. On 18 February 1931, Breisky tendered his retirement. His request was granted on 1 October.

Breisky spent his final years in Klosterneuburg, where he lived with his wife; he had married Rosa Kowarik, his long-time housekeeper, in 1927. Breisky does not appear to have kept in touch with former colleagues or political collaborators, but he was active in the Pan-Europe Movement and held honorary positions in a number of charities and hobbyists' clubs. He was the honorary president of the Viennese Animal Welfare Association (Wiener Tierschutzverein) and an honorary member of the local numismatic society. Breisky spent most of his time in his sprawling library, reading with a magnifying glass. He tried to prevent his eye problem from getting worse by self-medicating by consuming massive amounts of carrots and lemon juice.

There is evidence that Breisky felt disheartened by the political developments he witnessed during his sunset days. He expressed no support either for the Austrofascist takeover in 1934 or for the Nazi takeover in 1938. He withdrew further from public life after the Nazi Party came to power in Austria, resigning even his nominal membership in the International Statistical Institute. After the death of his wife on 17 November 1943, Breisky hired a nurse to take care of him. In September 1944, apparently reported to the authorities by his nurse, he was arrested by the Gestapo for listening to the BBC, a so-called Feindsender. On 25 September, shortly after his release from Nazi custody, Breisky committed suicide.
