= Second Schober government =

- Government of Austria

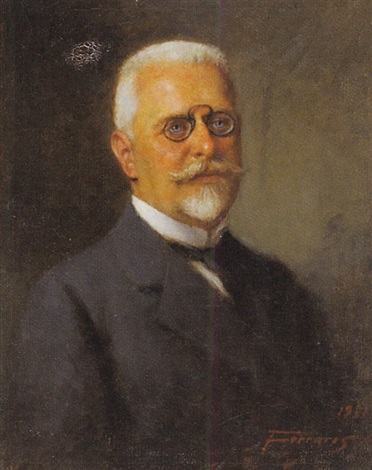
- Johannes Schober
- Date formed: January 27, 1922
- Date dissolved: May 31, 1922

People and organisations
- Head of government: Johannes Schober
- Deputy head of government: Walter Breisky
- No. of ministers: 7
- Member parties: Christian Social Party; Greater Germans

History
- Election: 1920
- Predecessor: Breisky
- Successor: Seipel I

The second Schober government (German: Regierung Schober II) was a short-lived coalition government, chaired by Johannes Schober, that led the First Austrian Republic from January 27, 1922, to May 31, 1922. The government was supported by the same right-of-center alliance of Christian Social Party and Greater German People's Party that had underpinned the first Schober government. In terms of personalities, it was virtually identical to the Breisky government that had replaced Schober's first cabinet for a single day after the alliance had temporarily broken down, the People's Party having become disaffected with Schober over his foreign policy. Schober never fully regained the People's Party's trust and was unseated for a second time a mere four months later.

== Background ==
=== Economy ===
In the final decades of the Austro-Hungarian Empire, the region that would later become the Republic of Austria had been dependent on Bohemian industry and on Bohemian and Hungarian agriculture for its standard of living. The Austria of 1921 was structurally weak and forced to import large amounts of food and coal from Czechoslovakia. The poor tax base and brutal trade imbalance prompted the Austrian government to print too much money. By 1921, the country had exhausted its reserves and inflation was galloping. Austria relied on foreign loans to keep buying Czechoslovak food and coal and to generally just keep running; it would require even more foreign loans, drastically larger ones, to reform its currency and to actually restructure. The list of potential creditors was short and consisted essentially of the Allies of World War I and of Czechoslovakia itself. None of these countries would loan the necessary amounts to Austria, however, as long as there were still worries that Austria might try to join the German Reich or to restore the Habsburgs to power in defiance of the Treaty of Saint-Germain.

In late 1921, the first Schober government negotiated the Treaty of Lana, an agreement with Czechoslovakia in which Austria promised to honor the Treaty of Saint-Germain, to refrain from interfering in Czechoslovak internal affairs, and to remain neutral in the event on an attack on Czechoslovakia by a third party. Czechoslovakia made equivalent promises in return. Czechoslovakia also promised to put in a good word for Austria in London and Paris and, in fact, committed to a generous loan itself. There finally seemed to be light at the end of the tunnel.

=== Political climate ===
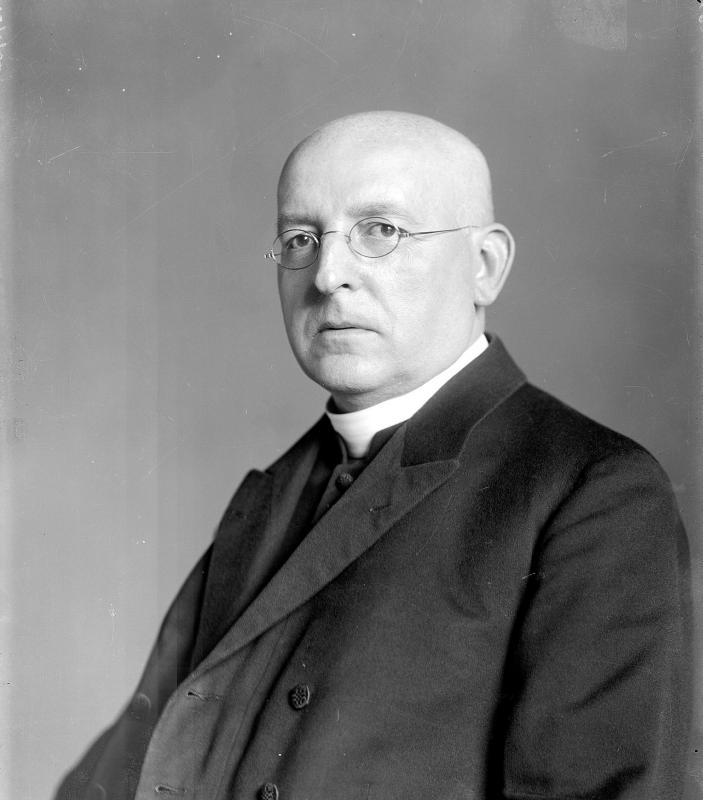
Ignaz Seipel, the Christian Social leader who first installed, then unseated Schober

The Christian Social Party held the plurality but not the majority of the seats in the National Council. A grand coalition of Christian Socials and Social Democrats had already been tried and failed; unable to reconcile their fundamentally different visions for the future of the country, Christian Social and Social Democratic leaders had achieved little but mutual deadlock. The failure of the grand coalition left the Greater German People's Party as the only plausible coalition partner.

The Republic of German-Austria had been proclaimed with the understanding that it would eventually join the German Reich, a vision shared by a clear majority of its population at the time. The treaties of Versailles and Saint-Germain prohibited a union of the two countries, but unification remained popular. In particular, the accession of Austria into the Reich was one of the two defining platform planks of the Greater German People's Party. In the Treaty of Lana, Austria reconfirmed its commitment to independence. Austria also reconfirmed its renunciation of all its claims to the Sudeten Germans, the German-speaking former Habsburg subjects living in what used to be Bohemia, another offense to the pan-German sensitivities of the People's Party. The same treaty that looked like it might turn the Austrian economy around thus also prompted the People's Party to withdraw its support from Schober, the decision that eventually brought down the first Schober government and lead to the installation of the Breisky government on January 26, 1922.

=== Personalities ===
The Christian Social Party being the plurality party, a coalition involving the Christian Socials would ordinarily have been led by Ignaz Seipel, their national chairman. In 1921, however, Seipel had declined to assume the chancellorship because of the difficult decisions and general hardship he knew still lay ahead; he had wanted someone else to do the dirty work. It had been Seipel's refusal that had made Schober chancellor for the first time in June 1921. Schober, career civil servant and long-time Vienna Chief of Police, enjoyed wide name recognition and was respected across party divides for his competence and effectiveness. He also enjoyed a reputation for personal integrity, an important point in a country sick of corruption and nepotism. Schober was known to be close to the pan-German cause but still considered nonpartisan. He had earned the trust of the Social Democrats during the transition from monarchy to republic in 1918, the trust of the political right through his energetic and proactive suppression of a planned Communist insurrection in 1919.

Within hours of Schober's resignation on January 26, 1922, Christian Social representatives, and possibly politicians of other parties as well, began lobbying for Schober's return behind the scenes; it was widely felt that there simply was no alternative. Schober let himself be persuaded and was made chancellor for a second time the very next day.

== Composition ==
The second Schober government consisted of the chancellor, the vice chancellor, and nine ministers. It featured the same peculiarities as the original Schober cabinet. The two bureaucrats leading the Ministry of Foreign Affair and the Ministry of Nutrition of the Population, respectively, were not actually ministers but merely "in charge of affairs" ("mit der Leitung betraut"), making them acting ministers for the purposes of cabinet meetings. The Ministry of the Interior and the Ministry of Education, historically independent but merged since the second Renner government, were not yet separated again, but in addition to the actual minister there was a state secretary (Staatssekretär) in charge of education affairs (betraut mit der Leitung der Angelegenheiten des Unterrichts und Kultus).

The original Schober government of June 1921 had been a "cabinet of civil servants" ("Beamtenkabinett") and had included only three members with formal party affiliations: Walter Breisky and Carl Vaugoin as representatives of the Christian Socials, Leopold Waber as the sole representative of the Greater German People's Party. Vaugoin had been replaced by in independent in October 1921; Waber had departed the cabinet when the People's Party withdrew support from Schober and did not return now that the People's Party was grudgingly resuming support. The second Schober government thus included exactly one Christian Social and no Greater German at all.

| Department | Office | Officeholder | Party |
|---|---|---|---|
| Chancellery | Chancellor | Johannes Schober | none |
| Chancellery | Vice chancellor | Walter Breisky | CS |
| Ministry of Education and the Interior | Acting minister | Johannes Schober | none |
| Ministry of Education and the Interior | In charge of education | Walter Breisky | CS |
| Ministry of Justice | Minister | Rudolf Paltauf | none |
| Ministry of Finance | Minister | Alfred Gürtler | none |
| Ministry of Agriculture and Forestry | Minister | Leopold Hennet | none |
| Ministry of Commerce, Industry and Construction | Minister | Alfred Grünberger | none |
| Ministry of Social Affairs | Minister | Franz Pauer | none |
| Ministry of Foreign Affairs | Acting minister | Leopold Hennet | none |
| Ministry of the Army | Minister | Josef Wächter | none |
| Ministry of Nutrition of the Population | Acting minister | Alfred Grünberger | none |
| Ministry of Transport | Minister | Walter Rodler | none |

The minister of finance resigned on May 10; Schober took over from him:

| Department | Office | Officeholder | Party |
|---|---|---|---|
| Ministry of Finance | Acting minister | Johannes Schober | none |

== Activity ==
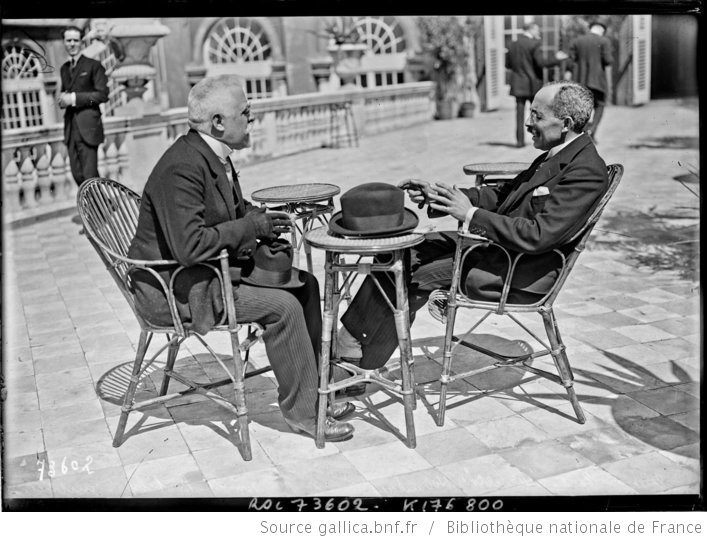
Chancellor Schober with the Dutch foreign minister, van Karnebeek at the 1922 Genoa Conference

Schober's main concerns were still Austria's dire financial situation in general and its lack of creditworthiness in particular.

The Treaty of Lana was an important first step in creating goodwill for the struggling country on the world stage, but there was a second problem. Article 197 of the Treaty of Saint-Germain stipulated that "[s]ubject to such exceptions as the Reparation Commission may make, the first charge upon all the assets and revenues of Austria shall be the cost of reparation and all other costs arising under the present Treaty". This so-called General Lien ("Generalpfandrecht") meant that the Allies could confiscate any revenue Austria earned, from any sources, or any property Austria owned, at any time and with little notice. The article could in fact be read to imply that even private property held by Austrian citizens was subject to seizure. Austria was unable to secure any loans, in other words, because it was unable to offer up any collateral. The Austrian economy would not recover unless and until the Allies could be persuaded to grant "exceptions" to the General Lien, pursuant to the right to do so that they had reserved for themselves in Article 197. By 1922, the Austrian political classes were well aware of this fact.

Luckily for Schober, the Allies were in the process of convening the Genoa Conference, a congress of some thirty nations meant to devise and formalize a comprehensive plan for the economic reconstruction of Europe, to be opened on April 10, 1922. The main topic of the conference was going to be the integration of the Soviet Union, still isolated and treated as a pariah by the international community in early 1922, into the international economic order. The Western powers demanded that the Soviet Union assume the heavy debts racked up by the Russian Empire it had replaced. When the Soviets objected that they could not afford to take on the Tsarist debt, the Western powers suggested that the Soviets extract the money necessary from Germany, by way of reparations payments. When the Soviet Union and Germany instead relinquished all claims against each other in the Treaty of Rapallo, the conference ended in failure. By the time the conference broke up, however, Schober and his minister of finance, Alfred Gürtler, had already extracted significant concessions. The General Lien was going to be suspended. France, the United Kingdom, and Italy would grant substantial loans.

== Replacement ==
Reluctant support in the National Council nonwithstanding, the Greater German People's Party had never fully forgiven Schober for the Treaty of Lana. When Seipel decided that the time had come for him to take over, the Greater Germans happily agreed to help him into the saddle. While Schober was out of the country to participate in the Genoa Conference, the two parties found a pretext to withdraw confidence in the chancellor – apparently Schober had technically overstepped his authority in connection with some minor fiscal matter. Schober learnt that he was in the process of being unseated again, and this time for good, during his return trip from the congress.

Schober formally resigned on May 24; he agreed to stay on in a caretaker capacity until the first Seipel government could be sworn in on May 31.
