= First Schober government =

Austrian coalition government (1921-1922)

- Government of Austria

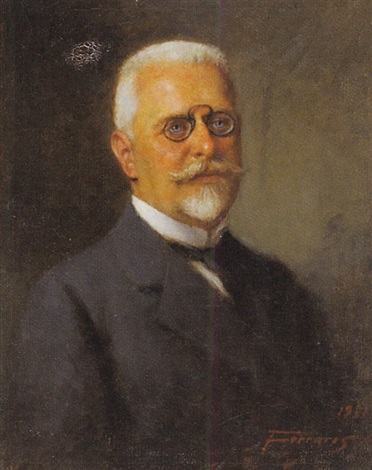
- Johannes Schober
- Date formed: June 21, 1921
- Date dissolved: January 26, 1922

People and organisations
- Head of government: Johannes Schober
- Deputy head of government: Walter Breisky
- No. of ministers: 9
- Member parties: Christian Social Party; Greater German People's Party

History
- Election: 1920
- Predecessor: Mayr II
- Successor: Breisky

In Austrian politics, the first Schober government (German: Regierung Schober I) was a short-lived coalition government led by Johannes Schober, in office from June 21, 1921 to January 26, 1922. Although the coalition, consisting of the Christian Social Party and the Greater German People's Party, was unambiguously right of center, the government itself was supposed to be nonpartisan – a so-called "cabinet of civil servants" ("Beamtenkabinett") loyal to the country rather than to any particular faction. Eight of its eleven members, including the chancellor himself, were political independents and career administrators in the employ of the Republic. The government's main opponent was the Social Democratic Party.

The main challenges facing the first Schober government were Austria's lack of money, rampant inflation, and dependence on imports the country became increasingly unable to afford. The government was in desperate need of credit, but loans would not be forthcoming until Austria assuaged fears among the Allies of World War I that it might attempt to defy the Treaty of Saint-Germain. The Treaty forbade Austria to pursue accession into Weimar Germany, an idea that was popular in Austria at the time and that was in fact one of the People's Party defining platform planks. When Schober managed to open lines of credit through confirming Austria's commitment to independence in the Treaty of Lana, the People's Party forced his resignation.

== Background ==
=== Economy ===
In the final decades of the Austro-Hungarian Empire, the region that would later become the Republic of Austria had been dependent on Bohemian industry and on Bohemian and Hungarian agriculture for its standard of living. The Austria of 1921 was structurally weak and forced to import large amounts of food and coal from Czechoslovakia. The poor tax base and brutal trade imbalance prompted the Austrian government to print too much money. By 1921, the country had exhausted its reserves and inflation was galloping. Austria relied on foreign loans to keep buying Czechoslovak food and coal and to generally just keep running; it would require even more foreign loans, drastically larger ones, to reform its currency and to actually restructure. These loans would not be forthcoming, however, as long as the Allies of World War I could not be thoroughly certain that Austria would obey the provisions of the Treaty of Saint-Germain. There were still fears among the Allies that Austria might try to join the German Reich in defiance of the treaty; these fears had to be laid to rest.

The Allies paid close attention to Austria's relationship with Czechoslovakia. Prague too was worried about a possible Austrian attempt to join Germany; Prague was also worried about a possible Austrian attempt to restore the Habsburgs to power. In March 1921, Charles I of Austria unsuccessfully attempted to reclaim the Hungarian throne. Although Hungary swiftly and roundly rebuffed the would-be king, the incident put additional strain on Austro-Czechoslovak relations. A resolution of the tensions would go a long way towards reassuring Austria's potential creditors.

=== Political climate ===
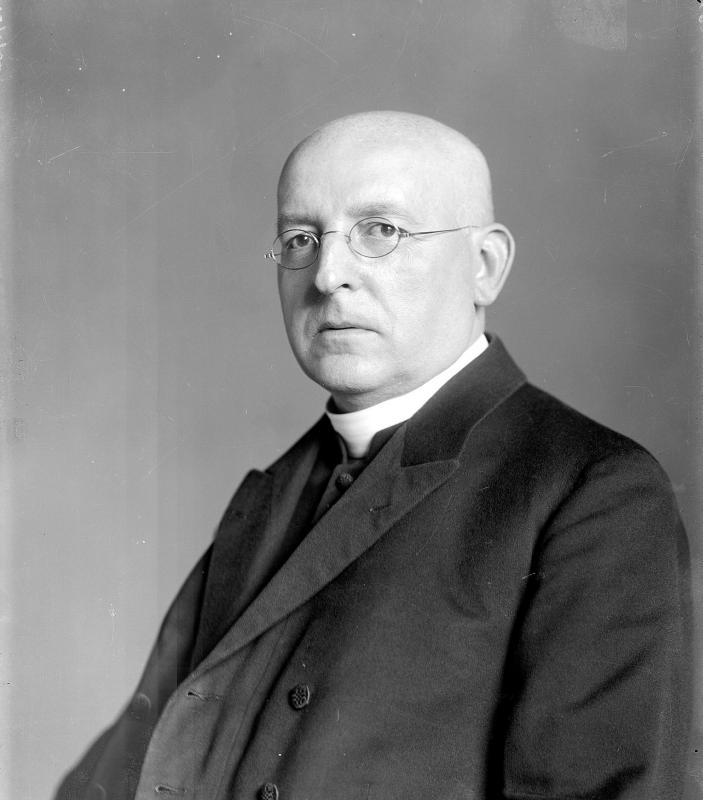
Ignaz Seipel, leader of the plurality party, would have been an obvious candidate for chancellor but declined to step up.

The fourteen parties in Austria's Constituent Assembly had radically different visions regarding the constitutional, territorial, and economic future of their demoralized, impoverished rump state. The Social Democratic Party controlled a plurality but not a majority of the seats. It eventually formed a grand coalition with the Christian Social Party, the largest party on the right and the second-largest party overall. The grand coalition was a pragmatic choice but not an ideologically undemanding one. The government found itself blocked at every turn by party leaders' unwillingness to compromise. No other alliance would have commanded the support of a stable parliamentary majority. Austrians began to warm to the idea of a "cabinet of civil servants" ("Beamtenkabinett"), a government of senior career bureaucrats who would be loyal to the country and not to any particular ideological camp. The Habsburg Empire had consciously cultivated an ethos of partisan neutrality in its civil servants. A pool of highly educated middle-aged administrators who counted sober professionalism as an important aspect of their self-image stood ready to be tapped.

The grand coalition had fallen apart by June 1920, but the right-of-center alliance succeeding it was not much more efficient. The idea of a cabinet of independents was still popular, and Johannes Schober was an obvious choice for the person to lead it. The Vienna Chief of Police enjoyed wide name recognition and was respected across party divides for his competence and effectiveness. He also enjoyed a reputation for personal integrity, an important point in a country sick of corruption and nepotism. He was known to be close to the pan-German cause but still considered nonpartisan.

Another obvious candidate for chancellor was Ignaz Seipel, the leader of the Christian Socials, who had displaced the Social Democrats as the plurality party in the elections of 1920. Seipel, however, was reluctant to assume the chancellorship because of the difficult decisions and general hardship he knew still lay ahead; he wanted someone else to do the dirty work.

The Republic of German-Austria had been proclaimed with the understanding that it would eventually join the German Reich, a vision shared by a clear majority of its population at the time. The treaties of Versailles and Saint-Germain prohibited a union of the two countries, but unification remained popular. In early 1921, several provincial governments hatched plans to break away from Austria and join Germany on their own; preparations for local referendums were made. Chancellor Michael Mayr ordered the would-be defectors to cease and desist but was ignored. Having lost its authority, the second Mayr government resigned on June 1, 1921. Schober looked like the man of the hour to politicians from all over the political spectrum.

== Composition ==
The government consisted of the chancellor, the vice chancellor, and nine ministers. There were a number of idiosyncrasies. Chancellor Schober doubled as the minister of foreign affairs, but technically only in an acting capacity (mit der Leitung betraut) and not as a minister proper. The Ministry of Nutrition of the Population too was led by an acting minister. The Ministry of the Interior and the Ministry of Education, historically independent but merged since the second Renner government, were not yet separated again, but in addition to the actual minister there was a state secretary (Staatssekretär) in charge of education affairs (betraut mit der Leitung der Angelegenheiten des Unterrichts und Kultus).

The Schober government, like its predecessor, depended on a coalition of Christian Social Party and Greater German People's Party for its support in the National Council. It therefore contained two symbolic Christian Social representatives and one symbolic People's Party delegate. The remaining eight of its eleven members were political independents.

Department	Office	Officeholder	Party
Chancellery	Chancellor	Johannes Schober	none
Chancellery	Vice chancellor	Walter Breisky	CS
Ministry of Education and the Interior	Minister	Leopold Waber	GDVP
Ministry of Education and the Interior	In charge of education	Walter Breisky	CS
Ministry of Justice	Minister	Rudolf Paltauf	none
Ministry of Finance	Minister	Ferdinand Grimm	none
Ministry of Agriculture and Forestry	Minister	Leopold Hennet	none
Ministry of Commerce, Industry and Construction	Minister	Alexander Angerer	none
Ministry of Social Affairs	Minister	Franz Pauer	none
Ministry of Foreign Affairs	Acting minister	Johannes Schober	none
Ministry of the Army	Minister	Carl Vaugoin	CS
Ministry of Nutrition of the Population	Acting minister	Alfred Grünberger	none
Ministry of Transport	Minister	Walter Rodler	none

Three ministers were replaced on October 7, 1921:

Department	Office	Officeholder	Party
Ministry of Finance	Minister	Alfred Gürtler	none
Ministry of Commerce, Industry and Construction	Minister	Alfred Grünberger	none
Ministry of the Army	Minister	Josef Wächter	none

The People's Party representative in the cabinet resigned on January 16, 1921; Schober took over from him:

Department	Office	Officeholder	Party
Ministry of Education and the Interior	Acting minister	Johannes Schober	none
Ministry of Education and the Interior	In charge of education	Walter Breisky	CS

== Activity ==
The emergency the Schober government had to deal with most urgently were the referendums on unification with Germany that a number of provinces were preparing. Schober convinced the provinces to abandon their plans. Schober succeeded where Mayr had failed partly because he was known to be pan-German himself, partly because he took, in addition to the chancellorship, personal control of the Ministry of Foreign Affairs. Schober's installation as both the chancellor and the foreign minister created the impression – the false impression, as it later turned out – impression that the pan-German cause was in good hands and that unsolicited unilateral action on the part of the regional governments would not be needed.

The provinces appeased, Schober next tried to improve Austria's poor relations with Czechoslovakia. The Czechoslovak foreign minister, Edvard Beneš, helpfully took the first step. Czechoslovakia had just created the Little Entente, an alliance of Czechoslovakia, Yugoslavia, and Romania that was meant to restrain Hungarian claims against its neighbors and to thwart Italy's attempts to assert dominance over the region. An Austrian accession to the Little Entente or, failing that, an Austrian declaration of support for the Little Entente, would have been highly useful to Czechoslovakia. Beneš ventured to impress the benefits of an alliance with Czechoslovkia on the Austrian ambassador. In his reply to Beneš, Schober insisted that Austria would not be able to join the Little Entente – due to the policy of neutrality that had been imposed on his rump state by the Treaty of Saint-Germain – but that Schober would be more than happy to meet with Beneš in order to discuss what could be done instead. Schober also expressed his hope that Beneš would find it in his heart to help open up lines of credit for Austria, by putting in a good word for the country "in Paris and London".

Beneš accepted the invitation. On August 10, 1921, Beneš and Tomáš Masaryk, the Czechoslovak president, traveled to Hallstatt and negotiated a compact of mutual understanding and support with their Austrian counterparts, Schober and Michael Hainisch. In the Political Agreement between the Republic of Austria and the Czechoslovak Republic (Politisches Abkommen zwischen der Republik Österreich und der Tschechoslowakischen Republik), the two countries promised each other to honor the Treaty of Saint-Germain, to respect each other's borders, to support each other diplomatically, and to remain neutral if either of them should be attacked by a third party. They further promised each other not to tolerate any activity on their respective soil that aimed to undermine the security of the respectively other, and to support each other against any attempt to restore the Habsburg regime.

The agreement was signed on December 16 during a return visit of the Austrians to Lány Castle, the summer seat of the Czechoslovak president. It became known as the Treaty of Lana (Vertrag von Lana) after the German name of the castle, Schloss Lana. On the occasion of the exchange of signatures, Czechoslovakia promised to grant Austria an immediate loan of CZK 500 million and to support Austria's entreaties for more money in France and the United Kingdom.

== Resignation ==
From the point of view of Schober, the Treaty of Lana was a resounding success. Austria had conceded nothing it had not conceded already in the Treaty of Saint-Germain. The treaty was a symbolic gesture, renewing old promises without making any new ones, but all the same a gesture that Czechoslovakia would handsomely reward. From the point of view of the People's Party, the treaty was tantamount to treason. The two defining platform planks of the People's Party were Antisemitism on the one hand and pan-Germanism on the other hand. The party had been hoping that Austria would, sooner or later, defy the Treaty of Saint-Germain and would seek accession to the German Reich. The party had also been hoping that the unification of all Germans would extend to the Sudeten Germans, the German-speaking former Habsburg subjects living in what used to be Bohemia. Schober, whom the party had considered a reliable ally, was renouncing both these goals.

In the final days of December 1921, the People's Party staged protest rallies against the treaty all over the country. Protests were also organized by other pan-German groups, including the nascent Nazi Party. Adolf Hitler traveled from Munich to Vienna to rail against the treaty in front of some six hundred sympathizers, a notable early appearance.

On January 16, 1922, the People's Party also withdrew its representative in Schober's cabinet, Leopold Waber. As long as Schober himself remained office, however, the People's Party was still bound by the original coalition agreement. The agreement required the party to vote in support of government bills in the National Council, and one of the government bills on the table in January 1922 was the ratification of the Treaty of Lana. Anxious to ensure the survival of the coalition, Schober defused the issue through resigning. On January 26, 1922, Schober stepped down. His vice chancellor Walter Breisky was sworn in as his successor, and the Treaty of Lana was ratified with the votes of Christian Socials and Social Democrats. The Breisky government was scrapped after a single day in office, and Schober returned to the chancellorship as the head of the second Schober government.
