= Alfred Grünberger =

Austrian civil servant, politician and diplomat

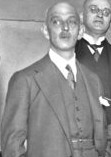
- Grünberger in 1923

Minister of Foreign Affairs
- In office 31 May 1922 – 20 November 1924
- Chancellor: Ignaz Seipel
- Preceded by: Leopold Hennet
- Succeeded by: Heinrich Mataja

Minister of Economy
- In office 7 October 1921 – 31 May 1922
- Chancellor: Johannes Schober
- Preceded by: Alexander Angerer
- Succeeded by: Emil Kraft

Personal details
- Born: 15 October 1875; Karlovy Vary, Austria-Hungary
- Died: 25 April 1935 (aged 59); Paris, France
- Children: 2
- Profession: Lawyer; Politician

Alfred Grünberger (15 October 1875 – 25 April 1935) was an Austrian civil servant, politician and diplomat.

== Early life and career ==
Grünberger was born on 15 October 1875 in Karlovy Vary as the son of a spa doctor. He studied law at Charles University. In 1898 he entered the Austrian civil service as a concept intern at the Lieutenancy in Prague and in December 1898, due to his language skills, he was assigned to the exhibition commission for the 1900 Paris Exhibition under Wilhelm Exner.

== Political and diplomatic career ==
From 9 July 1920 to 20 November 1920, Grünberger succeeded Johann Löwenfeld-Russ as interim head of the State Office for Public Nutrition. From 20 November 1920 to 31 May 1922, he headed the department as Federal Minister. In addition, he held the office of Federal Minister for Trade and Commerce, Industry and Buildings from 7 October 1921 to 31 May 1922 under the first and second government of Johannes Schober.

On 31 May 1922 he was appointed by Chancellor of Austria Ignaz Seipel as the Minister of Foreign Affairs, a position in which he served in until 20 November 1924. During this time, the Liechtenstein legislation in Vienna was closed, which Grünberger privately opposed. He received a visit from chargé d'affaires Josef Hoop regarding the closure who had also opposed it, which faced backlash from the Liechtenstein government as they had previously agreed to be represented by Switzerland instead. He then served as an plenipotentiary in Paris and Madrid from 1925 to 1932, in which his resignation was prompted by Ignaz Seipel's death.

== Later life ==
From 1932 Grünberger was the head of a French industrial company in Paris. He died on 25 April 1935 in Paris, aged 59 years old.

== Honours ==
- Vatican: Knight's Cross of the Order of St. Gregory the Great (1924)
