= Felix Frank =

Austrian politician

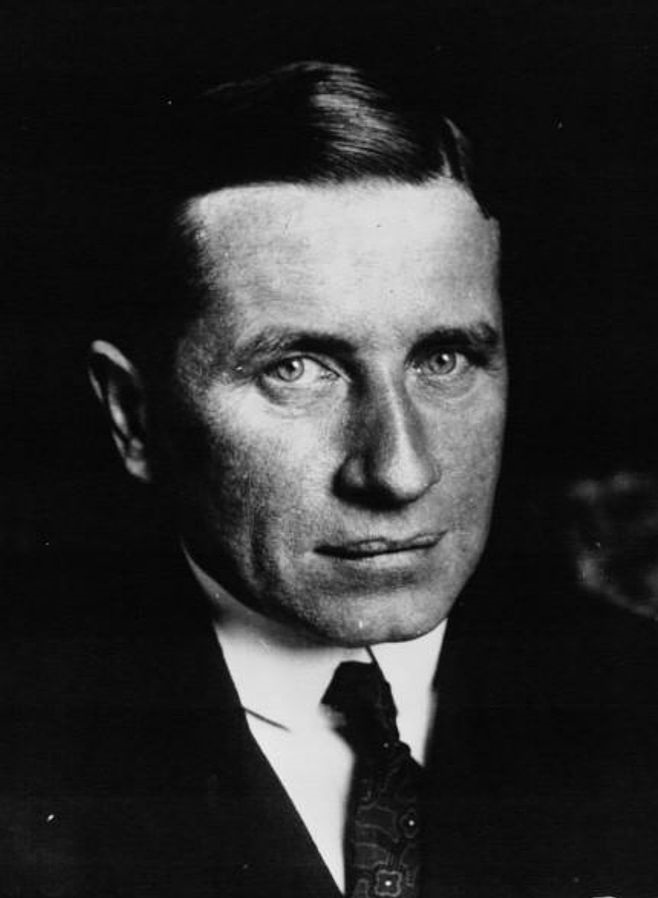

Vice-Chancellor of Austria
- In office 31 May 1922 – 20 November 1924
- Chancellor: Ignaz Seipel
- Preceded by: Walter Breisky
- Succeeded by: Leopold Waber

Personal details
- Born: 31 October 1876 Vienna, Austria-Hungary
- Died: 2 March 1957 (aged 80) Innsbruck, Austria
- Party: Greater German People's Party

Felix Frank (31 October 1876 in Vienna, then in Lower Austria as part of Austria-Hungary – 2 March 1957 in Innsbruck) was an Austrian politician from the Greater German People's Party who served as Vice-Chancellor of Austria from 31 May 1922 to 20 November 1924 under Chancellor Ignaz Seipel. From 1925 to 1932 he also served as Austrian ambassador to Germany.
