= Alfred Gürtler =

Austrian statistician, economist and politician (1875–1933)

- Born: 30 October 1875; Gabel, Bohemia, Austria-Hungary
- Died: 15 March 1933 (aged 57); Graz, Austria
- Political party: Christian Social Party

Alfred Gürtler (30 October 1875 – 15 March 1933) was an Austrian statistician, economist and politician who served as Austrian Finance Minister from 1921 to 1922. He was President of the National Council from 1928 to 1930. Before becoming a politician, Gürtler was a professor of statistics at the University of Graz.
