= Federal Chancellery of Austria =

Austrian government ministry

Coordinates: 48°12′30″N 16°21′50″E

Federal Chancellery
- Bundeskanzleramt

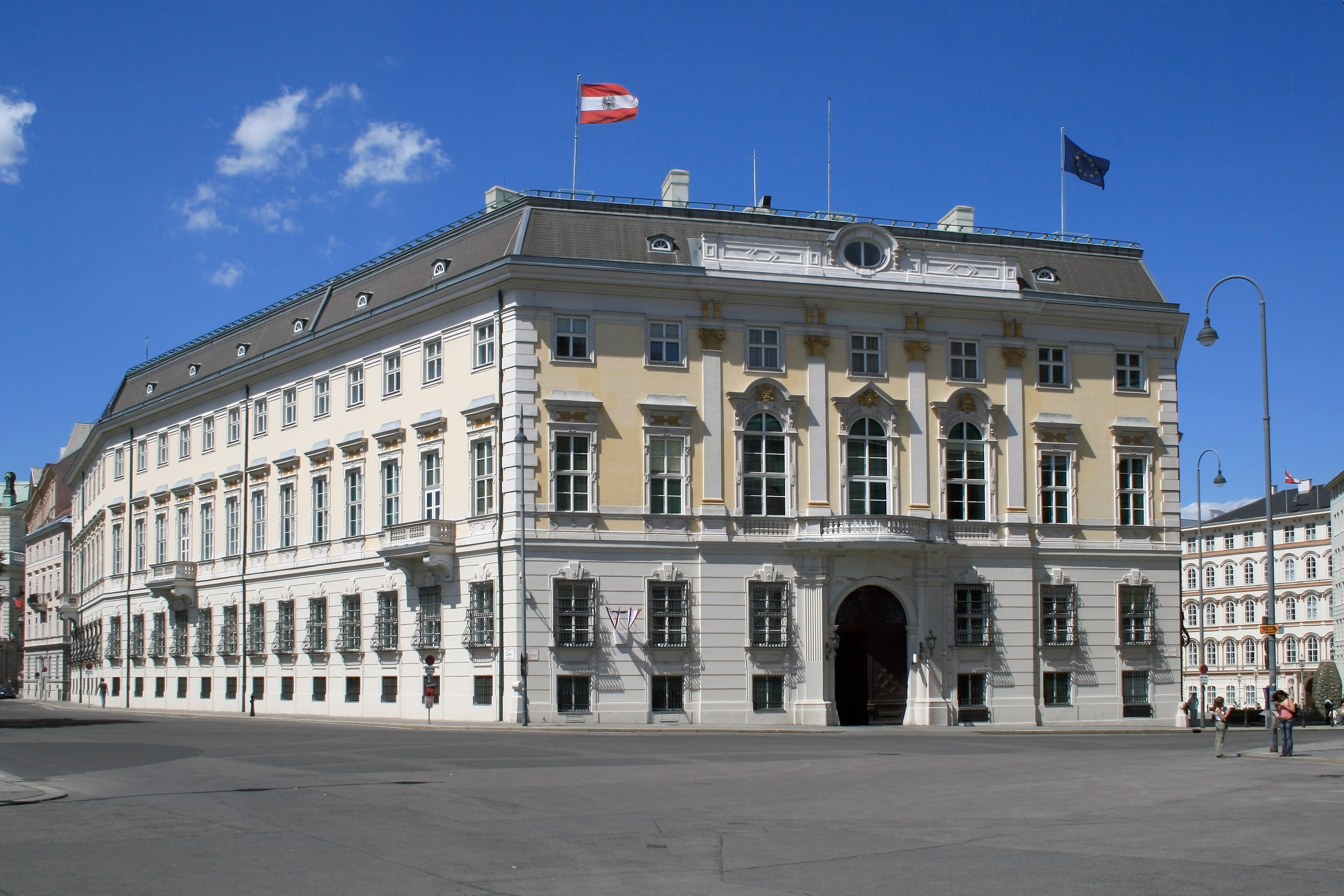

Agency overview
- Formed: 1742 (as building); 1920 (as agency)
- Jurisdiction: Government of Austria
- Status: Ministry and venue for cabinet sessions
- Headquarters: Ballhausplatz 2 Innere Stadt, Vienna
- Annual budget: €311 million (2019)
- Chancellor responsible: Christian Stocker
- Agency executives: Federal Minister; Ines Stilling
- Website: www.bka.gv.at

The Federal Chancellery of Austria (German: Bundeskanzleramt, abbreviated BKA; historically also Hofkanzlei and Staatskanzlei) is the ministry led by the chancellor of Austria. Since the establishment of the First Austrian Republic in 1918, the Chancellery building has served as the venue for the sessions of the Austrian cabinet. It is located on the Ballhausplatz in the centre of Vienna, vis-à-vis the Hofburg Imperial Palace. Like Downing Street, Quai d'Orsay or – formerly – Wilhelmstrasse, the address has become a synecdoche for governmental power.

== Responsibilities ==
The chancellery's primary function is to align the policies and public relations of the Federal Government. It represents the executive on federal level in matters of the Constitution of Austria and in international courts.

It is also in charge of women's rights and gender equality, civil service, public administration and management, exercised by Ines Stilling in the rank of a Federal Minister and member of the Austrian cabinet. It is further responsible for national security – if not in the Federal Ministry of the Interior's area of competence –, information privacy and information society, mass media affairs, news conferences and photojournalism, OECD relations, bioethics, and minority rights.

== History ==
Next to Hofburg Palace, residence of the Holy Roman Emperors and Habsburg Monarchs, the Baroque chancellery building designed by the Genoese architect Johann Lukas von Hildebrandt for chancellor Friedrich Karl von Schönborn was inaugurated in 1719 as Geheime Hofkanzlei, concerned with the foreign policy of Emperor Charles VI. From 1753 until 1792 Prince Wenzel Anton of Kaunitz-Rietberg resided here as State Chancellor of Empress Maria Theresa, Emperor Joseph II and Emperor Leopold II. In the 1760s, Kaunitz had the building significantly enlarged according to plans by Nicolò Pacassi. While Napoleon's troops occupied Vienna, Prince Klemens von Metternich was appointed Foreign Minister of the Austrian Empire in 1809 and moved into the chancellery building with his family to live here during the winter months. In 1814/15 his residence served as venue of the Vienna Congress. After the 1848 revolutions, Minister-President Prince Felix of Schwarzenberg took his seat at the chancellery and made it the centre of his rule.

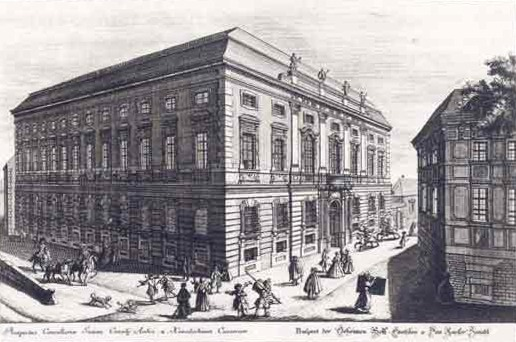
Hofkanzlei, 1733 engraving

Until the dissolution of the Austro-Hungarian Monarchy in 1918, the building was the seat of the k.u.k. Minister of Foreign Affairs, from 1867 also Chairmen of the Ministers' Council for Common Affairs arbitrating between the Cisleithanian (Austrian) and Transleithanian (Hungarian) minister-presidents. During the July Crisis of 1914, the declaration of war against Serbia was prepared here at the behest of Minister Count Leopold Berchtold. On 30 October 1918 the German-speaking deputies of the Cisleithanian Imperial Council convened as a provisional National Assembly of German Austria to elect a Staatsrat government headed by Chancellor Karl Renner. According to the 1920 Constitution of Austria (Bundes-Verfassungsgesetz, B-VG) authored by Hans Kelsen, the office of the Austrian chancellor was established, with his residence on Ballhausplatz. Several chancellors of the Austrian First Republic also served as Foreign Ministers, a separate Federal Ministry for Foreign Affairs was not established until 1959 under Minister Bruno Kreisky. Until 1946 the building also housed the office of the Austrian Federal President.

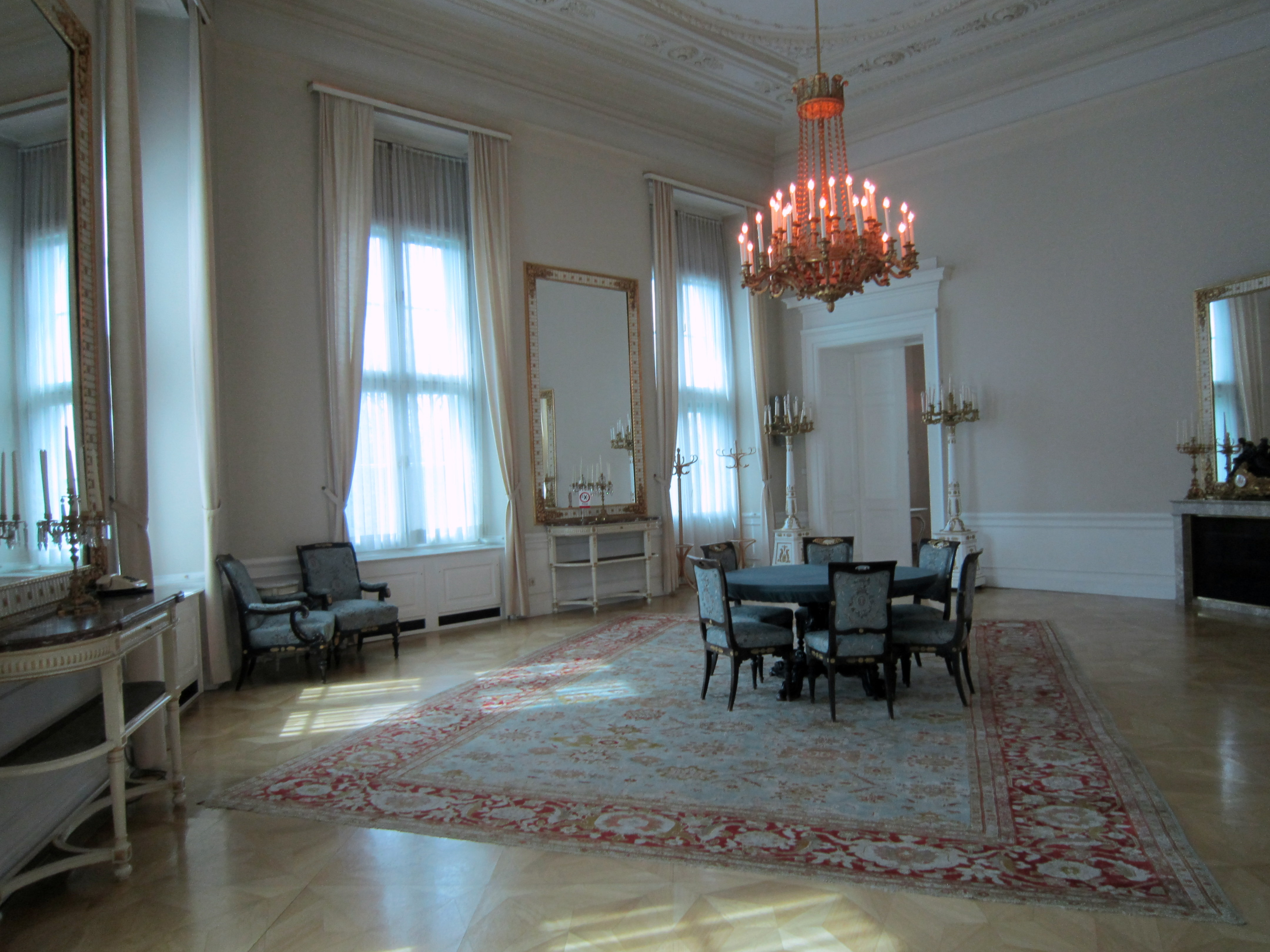
Interior

On 25 July 1934 Chancellor Engelbert Dollfuss was shot here by Nazi insurgents during the July Putsch. Upon the Austrian Anschluss to Nazi Germany and the resignation of President Wilhelm Miklas on 13 March 1938, Arthur Seyss-Inquart resided on Ballhausplatz as a Reichsstatthalter and head of the Ostmark state government, which was abolished by order of Adolf Hitler on 30 April 1939. Until the end of World War II, the building was used as the seat of the local Reichsgau Wien administration under Josef Bürckel and Baldur von Schirach. Heavily damaged by Allied bombing, the chancellery building was recaptured by the provisional Austrian state government under Karl Renner with consent of the Soviet military authority in Allied-occupied Austria on 27 April 1945. Upon the Austrian legislative election of 1945, the National Council parliament elected Leopold Figl the first post-war chancellor on December 20. The chancellery building was restored until 1950.

== Organization ==
The organization has changed by every governing period in Austria since 1970. The Chancellor Christian Stocker is currently assisted by two Chancellary ministers within the Federal Chancellery, managing the agency's presently (2020) six departments (Sektionen) as follows:

- I: Presidium (secretary general Bernd Brünner)
- II: Integration, Culture and Minorities (Martin Klienl)
- III: Women's Affairs and Gender Mainstreaming (Jennifer Resch)
- IV: EU, International Affairs and Principal Questions (Barbara Kaudel-Jensen)
- V: Constitution (Albert Posch)
- VI: Family and Youth (Bernadett Humer)

== See also ==
- List of minister-presidents of Austria
- List of chancellors of Austria
- Politics of Austria
