= Christian Social Party (Austria) =

Austrian political party (1891–1934)

Christian Social Party Christlichsoziale Partei
- Founder: Karl Lueger
- Founded: 1891/1893
- Dissolved: 1934
- Merged into: Fatherland Front
- Headquarters: Vienna, Austria
- Ideology: Social conservatism Political Catholicism; Austrian nationalism Antisemitism; Right-wing populism Christian socialism Corporatism; Monarchism (until 1918, later factions)
- Political position: Right-wing
- Religion: Roman Catholicism
- International affiliation: White International (since 1931)

The Christian Social Party (German: Christlichsoziale Partei, CS or CSP) was a major conservative political party in the Cisleithanian crown lands of Austria-Hungary and under the First Austrian Republic, from 1891 to 1934. The party was affiliated with Austrian nationalism that sought to keep Catholic Austria out of the State of Germany founded in 1871, which it viewed as Protestant and Prussian-dominated; it identified Austrians on the basis of their predominantly Catholic religious identity as opposed to the predominantly Protestant religious identity of the Prussians.

== History ==
=== Foundation ===
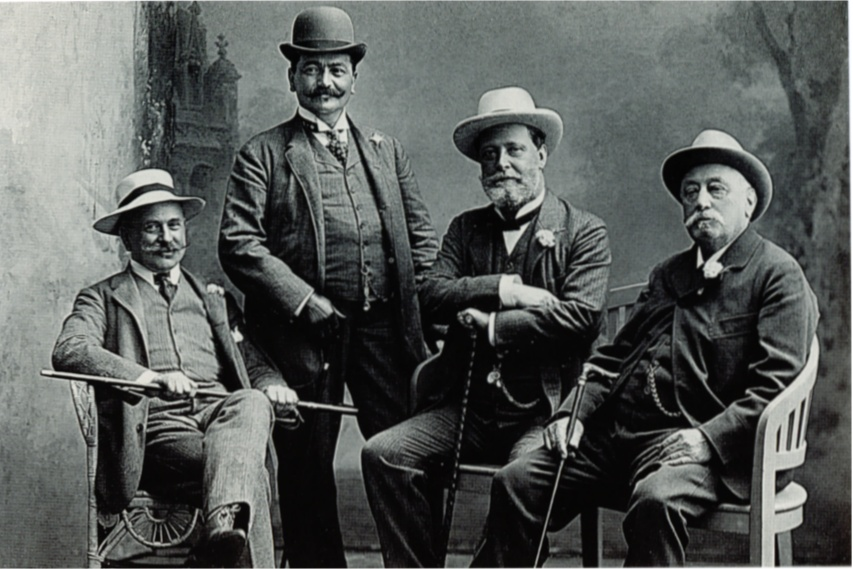
Lueger (2nd from right) and CS party fellows, about 1905

The party emerged in the run-up to the 1891 Imperial Council (Reichsrat) elections under the populist Vienna politician Karl Lueger (1844–1910). Referring to ideas developed by the Christian Social movement under Karl von Vogelsang (1818–1890) and the Christian Social Club of Workers, it was oriented towards the petit bourgeoisie and clerical-Catholic; there were many priests in the party, including the later Austrian chancellor Ignaz Seipel, which attracted many votes from the tradition-bound rural population. As a social conservative counterweight to the "godless" Social Democrats, the party gained mass support through Lueger's anti-liberal and antisemitic slogans. Its support of the Austro-Hungarian cohesion and the ruling House of Habsburg also gave it considerable popularity among the noble class, making it an early example of a big tent party.

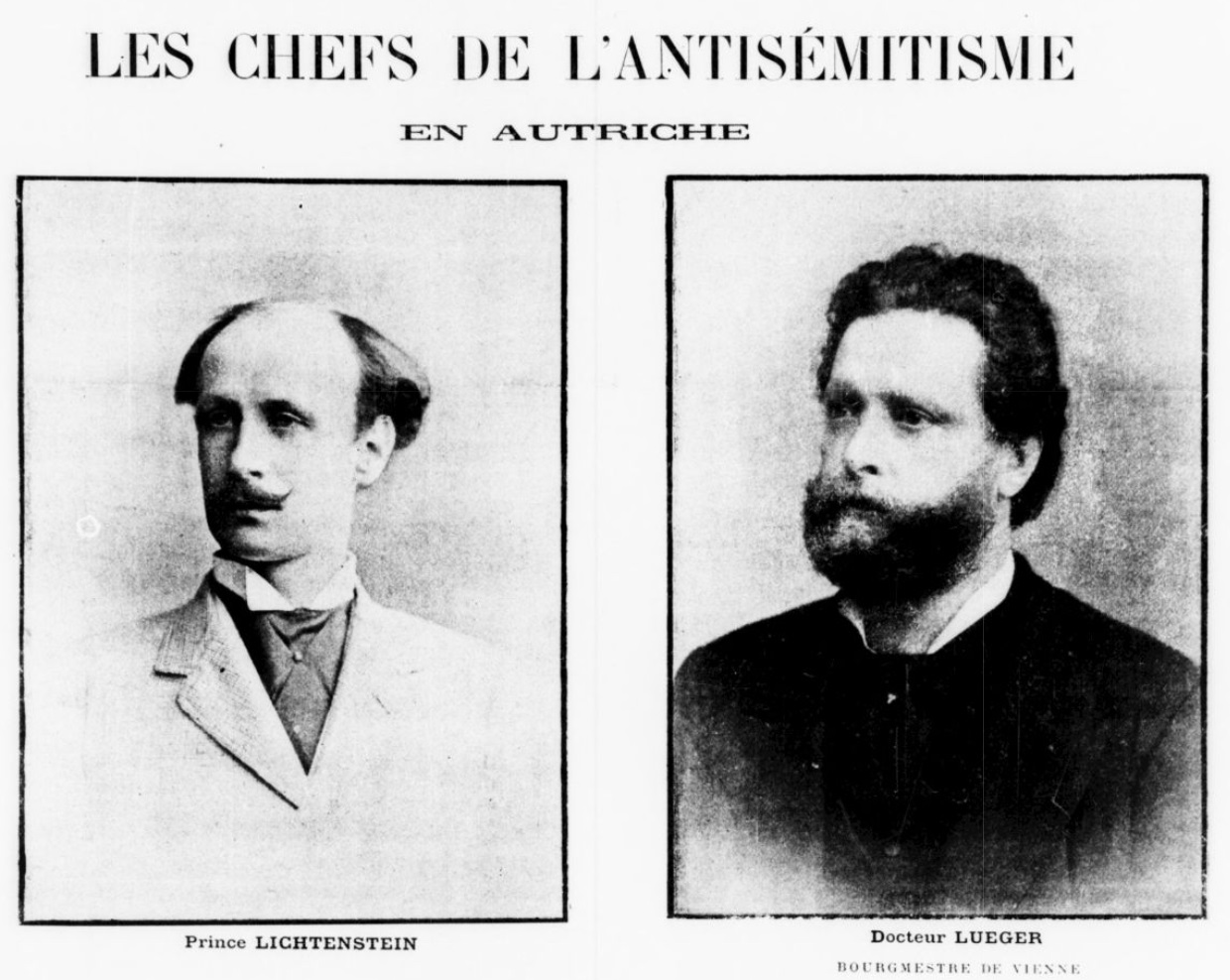
The leaders of Austrian antisemitism: Prince Louis of Liechtenstein and Karl Lueger (L'Antijuif, 1899)

Upon the implementation of universal suffrage (for men) under minister-president Max Wladimir von Beck, the CS gained plurality in the 1907 Reichsrat elections, becoming the largest parliamentary group in the Lower House; however already in the 1911 elections, it lost this position to the Social Democratic Workers' Party (SDAP). Though Minister-president Karl von Stürgkh had ignored the discretionary competence of the parliament during the 1914 July Crisis, the Christian Social Party backed the Austrian government during World War I. Nevertheless, when upon the dissolution of the Monarchy in October 1918 the German-speaking Reichsrat representatives met in a "provisional national assembly", the 65 CS deputies voted for the creation of the Republic of German-Austria and its accession to Weimar Germany, though shortly after members of the party began to oppose German annexation.

=== First Republic ===
After the 1918 assembly had elected the Social Democrat Karl Renner state chancellor, the Christian Social Party formed a grand coalition with the SDAP under Karl Seitz. In the 1919 Austrian Constitutional Assembly election, the CS gained 35.9% of the votes cast, making it again the second strongest party after the Social Democrats. With its support, the assembly enacted the Habsburg Law concerning the expulsion and the takeover of the assets of the House Habsburg-Lorraine. On 10 September 1919, Chancellor Karl Renner had to sign the Treaty of Saint-Germain, which prohibited any affiliation with Germany. It was ratified by the assembly on 21 October.

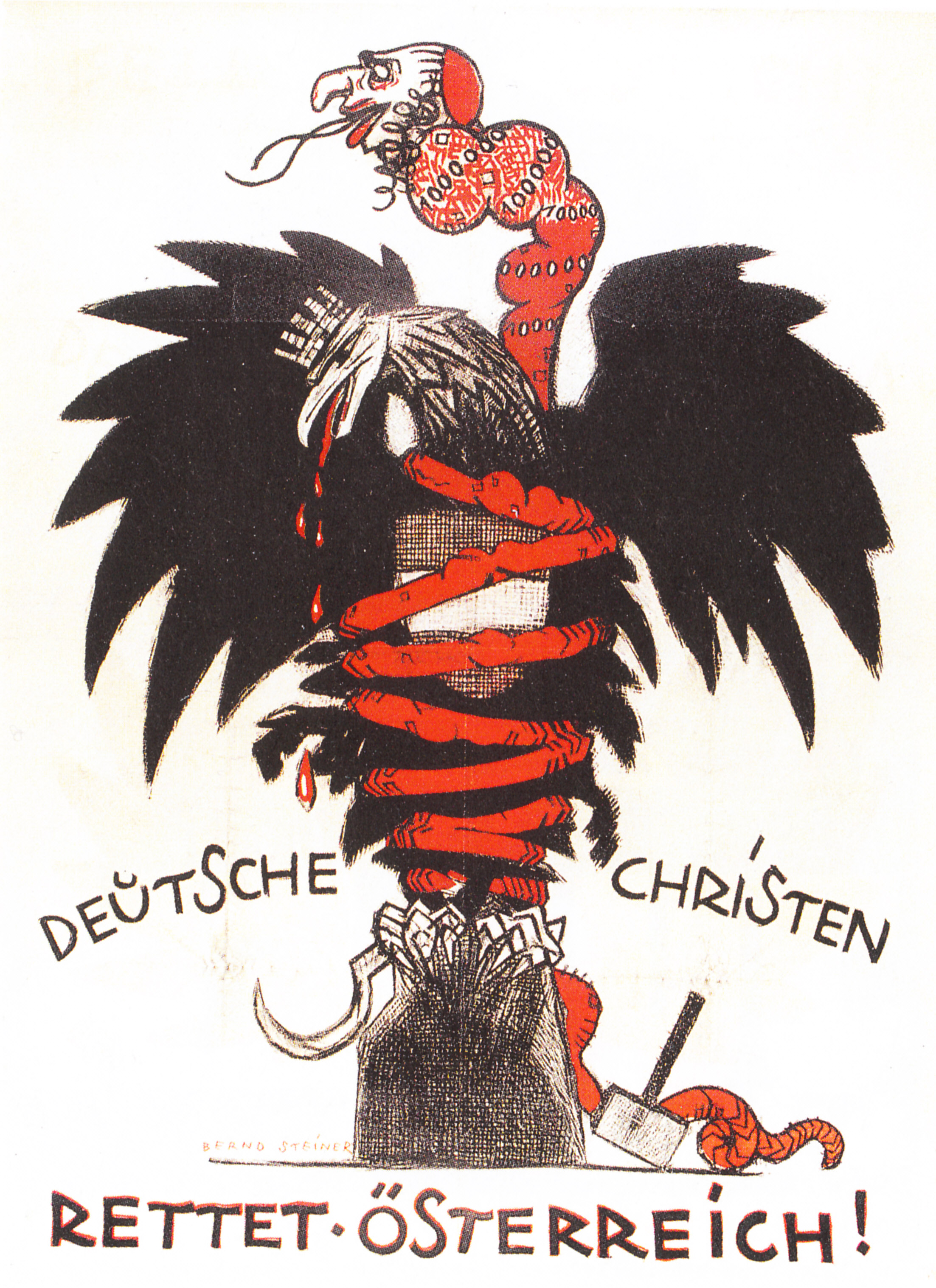
Antisemitic CS poster of 1920, depicting a Judeo-Bolshevik serpent choking the Austrian eagle; Text: "German Christians – Save Austria!"

However, in the following year the coalition broke up and Renner resigned on 11 July 1920, succeeded by the Christian Social politician Michael Mayr. Both parties agreed on scheduling new elections and the national assembly dissolved after it had passed the Constitution of Austria on 1 October 1920. Upon the following 1920 election, the CS gained 41.8% of the votes cast surpassing the Social Democrats and as the strongest party entered into a right-wing coalition with the newly established nationalist Greater German People's Party (GDVP). The National Council parliament, successor of the national assembly, re-elected Mayr chancellor in November 1920. The CS also nominated the non-partisan Michael Hainisch, actually a Greater German sympathizer, for Austrian president, who was elected by the Federal Assembly on 9 December.

All Chancellors of the First Austrian Republic from 1920 onwards were members of the Christian Social Party, as was President Wilhelm Miklas, who succeeded Hainisch in 1928. The Social Democrats remained in opposition and concentrated on their Red Vienna stronghold, while the Austrian political climate polarized over the next years.

Chancellor Mayr had to resign as chancellor in 1922, after the Greater German People's Party left the coalition in disagreement over a treaty signed with the Czechoslovak republic concerning the Sudeten German territories. He was succeeded by Ignaz Seipel, CS chairmen since 1921. Seipel, a devout Catholic and fierce opponent of the Social Democrats, was able to re-arrange the coalition with the GDVP and was elected chancellor on 31 May 1922. From 1929 onwards, the party tried to form an alliance with the Heimwehr movement. Because of the instability of this coalition the party leadership decided to reform a coalition with the agrarian Landbund.

=== Fatherland Front ===
In the process of establishing the so-called Austro-fascist dictatorship, Christian Social Chancellor Engelbert Dollfuß founded the Fatherland Front (Vaterländische Front) on 20 May 1933, merging the CS with the Landbund, Heimwehr and other conservative groups. The party was finally dissolved with the entry into force of the May Constitution of 1934, the foundation of the Federal State of Austria.

== Chairmen ==
Chairperson	Period
Karl Lueger	1893–1910
Prince Louis of Liechtenstein	1910–1918
Johann Nepomuk Hauser	1918–1920
Leopold Kunschak	1920–1921
Ignaz Seipel	1921–1930
Carl Vaugoin	1930–1934
Emmerich Czermak	1934

== Notable members ==
Prominent members of the CS included:

- Karl Buresch
- Engelbert Dollfuß
- Otto Ender
- Iancu Flondor
- Viktor Kienböck
- Karl Lueger
- Michael Mayr
- Julius Raab
- Rudolf Ramek
- Richard Schmitz
- Kurt von Schuschnigg
- Ignaz Seipel
- Fanny von Starhemberg
- Ernst Streeruwitz
- Josef Strobach
- Carl Vaugoin
- Richard Weiskirchner
- Alexandru Vaida-Voevod

== Notes and references ==
- Schindler, Franz Martin: Die soziale Frage der Gegenwart, vom Standpunkte des Christentums, Verlag der Buchhandlung der Reichspost Opitz Nachfolger, Wien 1905, 191 S.
