= Austrian Civil War =

1934 civil war within the First Austrian Republic

- Part of the interwar period
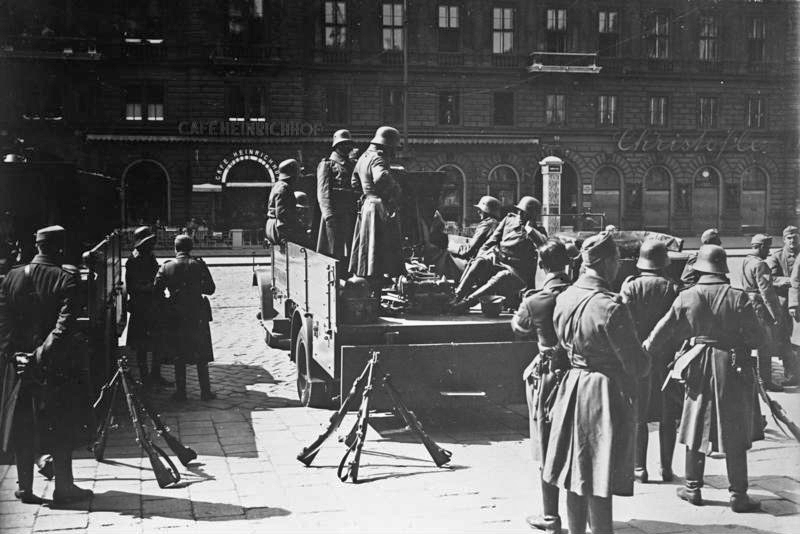
- Soldiers of the Austrian Federal Army in Vienna, 12 February 1934
Date	12–15 February 1934 (4 days)
Location	Various cities in Austria
Result	Fatherland Front victory: Demise of multi-party system; Establishment of the Federal State of Austria

Belligerents
SDAPÖ: Republikanischer Schutzbund; KPÖ	First Austrian Republic; Fatherland Front; Federal Army; Federal Gendarmerie; Heimwehr; Ostmärkische Sturmscharen

Commanders and leaders
Ludwig Bernaschek (surrendered); Richard Bernaschek	Engelbert Dollfuss; Emil Fey

Strength
10,000 – 20,000 rebelling Schutzbund members	Federal Army, police, gendarmeries, and paramilitary Heimwehr forces (est. 60,000)

Casualties and losses
Estimated 110 killed 399 wounded 9 executed	Estimated 110 killed 319 wounded
- Estimated 110 civilians killed

The Austrian Civil War (German: Österreichischer Bürgerkrieg) of 12–15 February 1934, also known as the February Uprising (Februaraufstand) or the February Fights (Februarkämpfe), was a series of clashes in the First Austrian Republic between the forces of the authoritarian right-wing government of Engelbert Dollfuss and the Republican Protection League (Republikanischer Schutzbund), the banned paramilitary arm of the Social Democratic Workers' Party of Austria. The fighting started when League members fired on the Austrian police who were attempting to enter the Social Democrats' party headquarters in Linz to search for weapons. It spread from there to Vienna and other industrial centres in eastern and central Austria. The superior numbers and firepower of the Austrian police and Federal Army quickly put an end to the uprising. The overall death toll is estimated at 350.

The socialists' defeat led to arrests, executions, and the banning of the Social Democratic Party. In May 1934, Austria's democratic constitution was replaced by the authoritarian constitution of the Federal State of Austria, with the Fatherland Front as the only legal party.

== Background ==
After the dissolution of Austria-Hungary in October 1918, the Republic of Austria formed as a parliamentary democracy. Two major factions dominated politics in the new country: socialists (politically represented by the Social Democratic Workers' Party) and conservatives (represented by the Christian Social Party). The socialists had their strongholds in the working-class districts of the cities, while the conservatives built on support from the rural population and most of the upper class. The conservatives also maintained close ties to the Catholic Church.

In the late 1920s the polarised political situation in Austria was exacerbated by paramilitary units such as the Home Guard (Heimwehr) on the right and the Republican Protection League (Republikanischer Schutzbund) of the Social Democrats (SDAPÖ) on the left. By the start of the civil war the Heimwehr were openly fascist and opposed democracy, while the Republican Protection League saw itself as a protector of the Austrian Republic holding the Austromarxist position on the dictatorship of the proletariat that was pro-democracy as part of the Social Democrats' party program. The still small Austrian Nazi Party had its SA and SS, which were also organized as paramilitary units.

=== July Revolt and suspension of Parliament ===
Political antagonisms in Austria escalated in 1927 when members of the right-wing Front Fighters' Union (Frontkämpfervereinigung) in Schattendorf (Burgenland) shot and killed two people, including a child, during a demonstration by the Republic Protection League. In the trial of the Schattendorf case, the jury acquitted the alleged perpetrators. On 15 July 1927, the day after the verdict, the SDAPÖ's leadership was not able to control the demonstrations of an outraged crowd. During the July Revolt, the Vienna Palace of Justice was stormed and set on fire. After police guardrooms were also attacked, the police president, Johannes Schober, gave orders to disperse the demonstrators with armed force. People who were trying to flee as well as some who were not involved in the demonstration were caught in the police fire. The result was 89 dead, including four policemen, and 1,000 wounded.

The problems facing the First Republic worsened in the following years. The Great Depression resulted in high unemployment, and after Adolf Hitler became chancellor of Germany in 1933, Nazi sympathisers who wanted unification of Austria with Germany threatened the Austrian state from within.

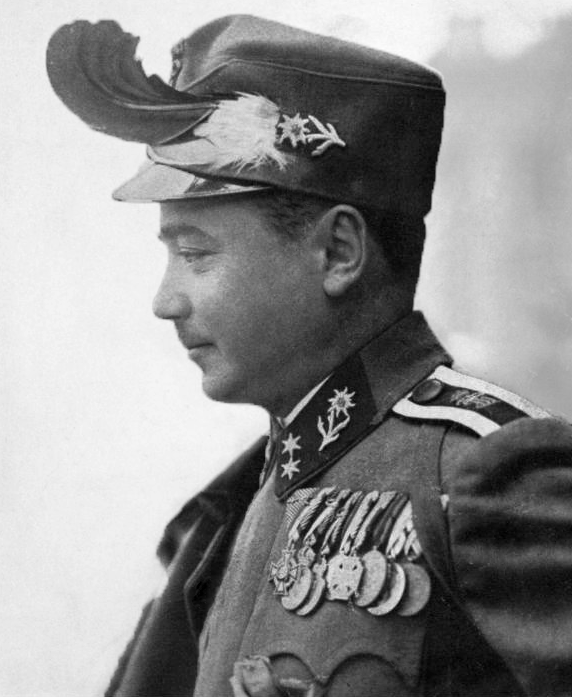
Austrian chancellor Engelbert Dollfuss wearing a Heimwehr uniform (1933)

On 4 March 1933, Engelbert Dollfuss, the Christian Social chancellor, suspended the Austrian Parliament. In a close vote on railway workers' wages in the National Council, each of the three presidents of parliament tactically resigned from their positions to cast a ballot, which left nobody to preside over the meeting. Even though the bylaws could have resolved the situation, Dollfuss used the opportunity to declare that Parliament had ceased to function and then blocked all attempts to reconvene it. Police forces barricaded the parliament building to prevent members from entering. The SDAPÖ thus lost its primary platform for political action. The Christian Socialists, facing pressure and violence not only from the left but also from Nazis infiltrating from Germany, were able to rule by decree on the basis of a 1917 emergency law. They began to suspend civil liberties and imprison members of the Social Democratic Party.

In the wake of armed conflicts, the Communist Party of Austria (KPÖ) was banned on 26 May 1933, as was the SDAPÖ's Republican Protection League on the 31st.

Dollfuss, the Fatherland Front and the Heimwehr then set about the destruction of the last remnants of the Social Democratic and Marxist-oriented workers' movement. On 24 January 1934, the order went out to search party buildings and members' homes for weapons belonging to the Protection League. The leaders of the SDAPÖ did not respond to the step-by-step disempowerment and disarming of their movement. Their cornerstone policy allowed them to fight only if the party were banned, the unions dissolved or the government of "Red Vienna" suppressed.

== Civil War ==
In the early morning hours of 12 February 1934, when police went to search for weapons at the Linz party headquarters of the Social Democrats in the Hotel Schiff, the members of the Protection League, under their local commander Richard Bernaschek, opened fire. A coded telegram to him from the SDAPÖ's leaders that warned him urgently against any action and instructed him to await the decision of party leadership had been intercepted by the authorities and never reached him.

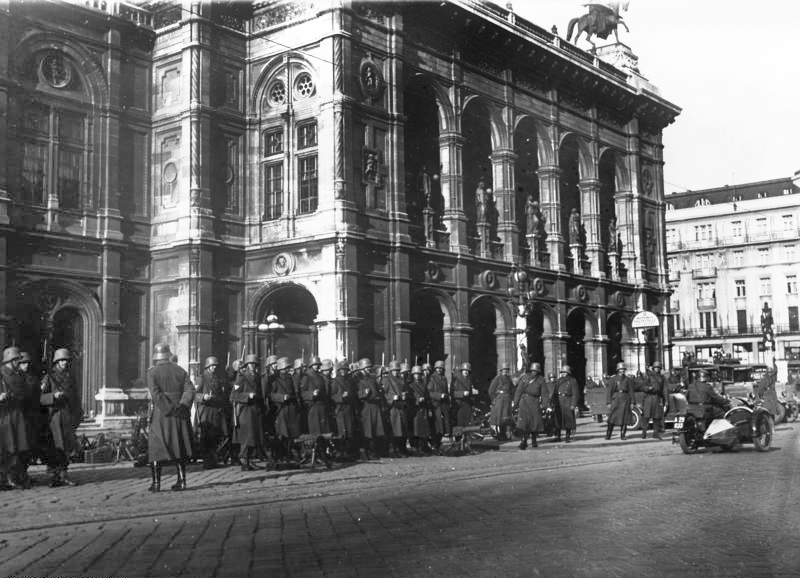
Federal Army soldiers take position in front of the Vienna State Opera

The fighting spread to other cities and towns in Austria. In Vienna, members of the Protection League barricaded themselves in city council housing estates (Gemeindebauten), which served as symbols and strongholds for the socialist movement in Austria. Police and paramilitaries took up positions outside the fortified complexes, and the parties exchanged small arms fire. Fighting also occurred in industrial towns including Steyr, Sankt Pölten, Weiz, Eggenberg (Graz), Kapfenberg, Bruck an der Mur, Graz, Ebensee, and Wörgl.

A decisive moment in the conflict came when the Austrian armed forces, which had remained a comparatively independent institution, entered on the side of the government. Dollfuss ordered Karl-Marx-Hof, a council housing estate, to be shelled with light artillery, endangering the lives of civilians and destroying many flats before the socialist fighters surrendered. The fighting ended in Vienna and Upper Austria by 13 February, but continued in Styrian cities, especially in Bruck an der Mur and Judenburg, until 14 February. By 15 February 1934, the Austrian Civil War had ended.

The police, Army and Heimwehr divisions that supported them had defeated the poorly networked Protection League relatively easily. Between 10,000 and 20,000 workers stood against a superior force of almost 60,000 men from the gendarmerie and police, the Army and home defence forces. Besides the imbalance in numbers and the Austrian Army's use of artillery, the major reason for the uprising's collapse was likely the failure of the call for a general strike to be heeded. The hoped-for solidarity of law enforcement with the insurgents also did not come about. The Army, police and gendarmerie all remained loyal to the state.

In large parts of the country, (Lower Austria, Carinthia, Salzburg, Tyrol, Vorarlberg and Burgenland) complete calm prevailed. Leading Social Democrats in Carinthia and Vorarlberg distanced themselves at the outset from the uprising. The mayor of Klagenfurt and the deputy governor of Carinthia announced their resignations from the SDAPÖ.

Austria, or even just Vienna, was far from being in a state of complete turmoil. The daily newspapers of the time had only short reports on the revolts. Stefan Zweig, a contemporary observer who was inclined towards the SDAPÖ, wrote:

I was in Vienna during those historic February days and saw nothing of the decisive events that played out in Vienna and knew nothing, not the slightest bit, while they were happening. Cannons were fired, houses occupied, hundreds of corpses carried away – I saw not a single one. ... In the city's central districts, everything went on as quietly and regularly as usual, while in the suburbs the battle raged, and we foolishly believed the official reports that everything was already settled and done with.

== Aftermath ==
=== Short term ===
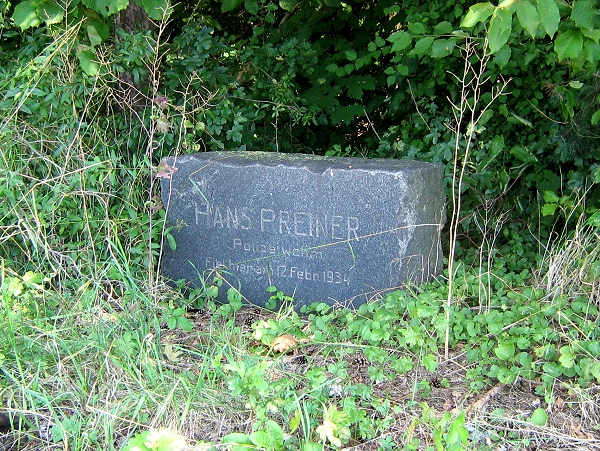
Memorial stone for a police officer killed on 12 February 1934 in Linz during the civil war

The Dollfuss government published a statement on 1 March 1934 reporting that 193 civilians had been killed and 493 wounded in the fighting, while among the police and Army there were 104 dead and 309 wounded. Analyses by later researchers vary widely, going as high as British journalist George Eric Rowe Gedye's estimate of 2,000 dead and 5,000 wounded. According to a comprehensive 2018 study by historian Kurt Bauer, between 350 and 370 people lost their lives in the fighting – about 130 of them uninvolved civilians and 110 each among the government forces and members of the Protection League. The largest number of deaths – about 200 to 220 – were in Vienna.

On 11 November 1933, all of Austria had been placed under martial law, during which the death penalty was reintroduced for certain crimes. An emergency decree of 12 February 1934 extended the list to rebellion, so that Protection League members who had been taken prisoner while armed (estimated at 10,000) could be sentenced to death. The defendants were tried within three days in abbreviated procedures by summary courts consisting of four professional judges.

The summary courts condemned 24 people to death, of whom 15 were pardoned. Nine men, some of them prominent members of the Protection League, were executed. Carrying out the death sentences was controversial even among those in the government who were responsible for it. Heimwehr leader Ernst Starhemberg saw it as a shameful act of revenge and without sense, while Emil Fey, also a leader in the Heimwehr, insisted on the executions. Pleas for clemency from Cardinal Theodor Innitzer and the Holy See were ignored. The detention camp at Wöllersdorf, which opened in the fall of 1933 for opponents of the regime – initially mostly communists and National Socialists – also held Social Democrats after February 1934.

The leadership of the SDAPÖ under Otto Bauer (the leading theoretician of Austromarxism), Julius Deutsch and others fled to Czechoslovakia on 13 February, a move that the representatives of the government exploited as propaganda.

=== Long term ===
The incidents of February 1934 were taken as a pretext by the government to ban the Social Democratic Party and its affiliated trade unions altogether. In May, the conservatives replaced the democratic constitution by a corporatist constitution modelled along the lines of Benito Mussolini's fascist Italy, for which the socialists coined the term Austrofascism. The Fatherland Front, into which the Heimwehr and the Christian Social Party were merged, became the only legal political party in the resulting authoritarian regime, the Federal State of Austria.

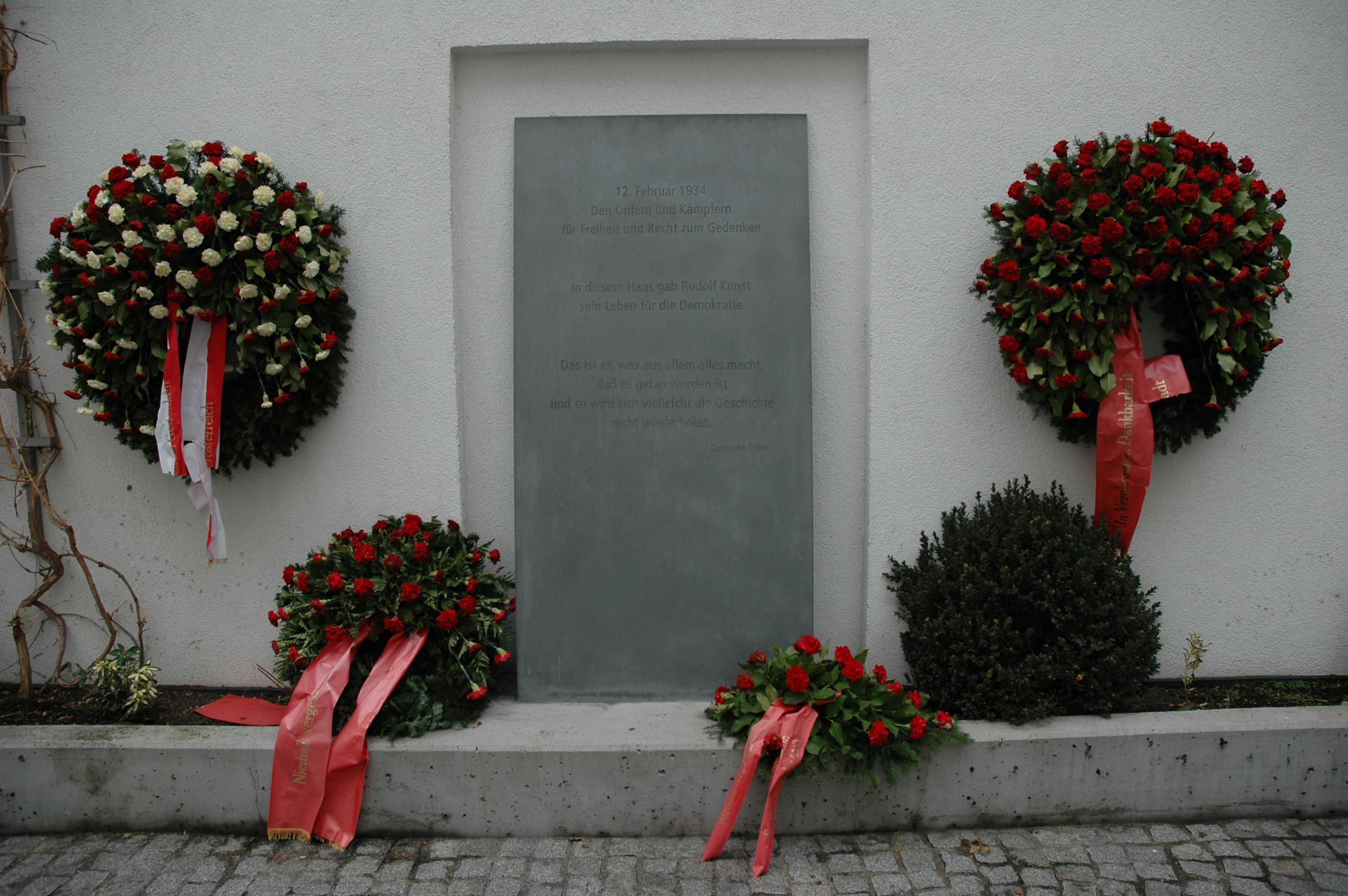
Memorial to the victims and fighters at the place where the civil war started, in the courtyard of the Hotel Schiff in Linz

The government found itself isolated domestically because the Social Democrats – above all due to the death sentences that had been carried out – turned away from the state and either called for open resistance using such means as leaflets or went into a kind of inner emigration. In his speech during the 1936 socialist trial of 28 people accused of violating the ban on the SDAPÖ, Bruno Kreisky (who was himself on trial) alluded to the issue:

It is also possible that in a difficult moment, the government will have to call on the broad masses of the people to defend the borders. But only a democratic Austria will respond to such a summons. Only free citizens will fight against the gagging of Austria.

In detention centres and prisons of the Second Republic, Social Democrats and National Socialists come into contact with one another. For both, 'Austrofascism' was the enemy. The common ground was to affect the political assessments of former National Socialists after World War II.

With a greater passage of time it became clear that Austria's ability to resist National Socialism was decidedly weakened by the Austrian Civil War and its consequences. By later estimates, only about a third of the Austrian population supported the dictatorial state.

After the Second World War, when Austria reemerged on the political landscape as a sovereign nation, politics again fell under the domination of the Social Democrats and the conservatives, the latter in the Austrian People's Party (ÖVP). To avoid repeating the bitter divisions of the First Republic, leaders of the Second Republic of Austria were determined to promote the principle of a broad consensus as a core element of the new political system. They introduced the concept of the Grand coalition in which the two major parties shared the government and avoided open confrontation. The new system brought with it stability and continuity.

== See also ==
- History of Austria
