= Emil Fey =

Austrian nationalist and politician (1886–1938)

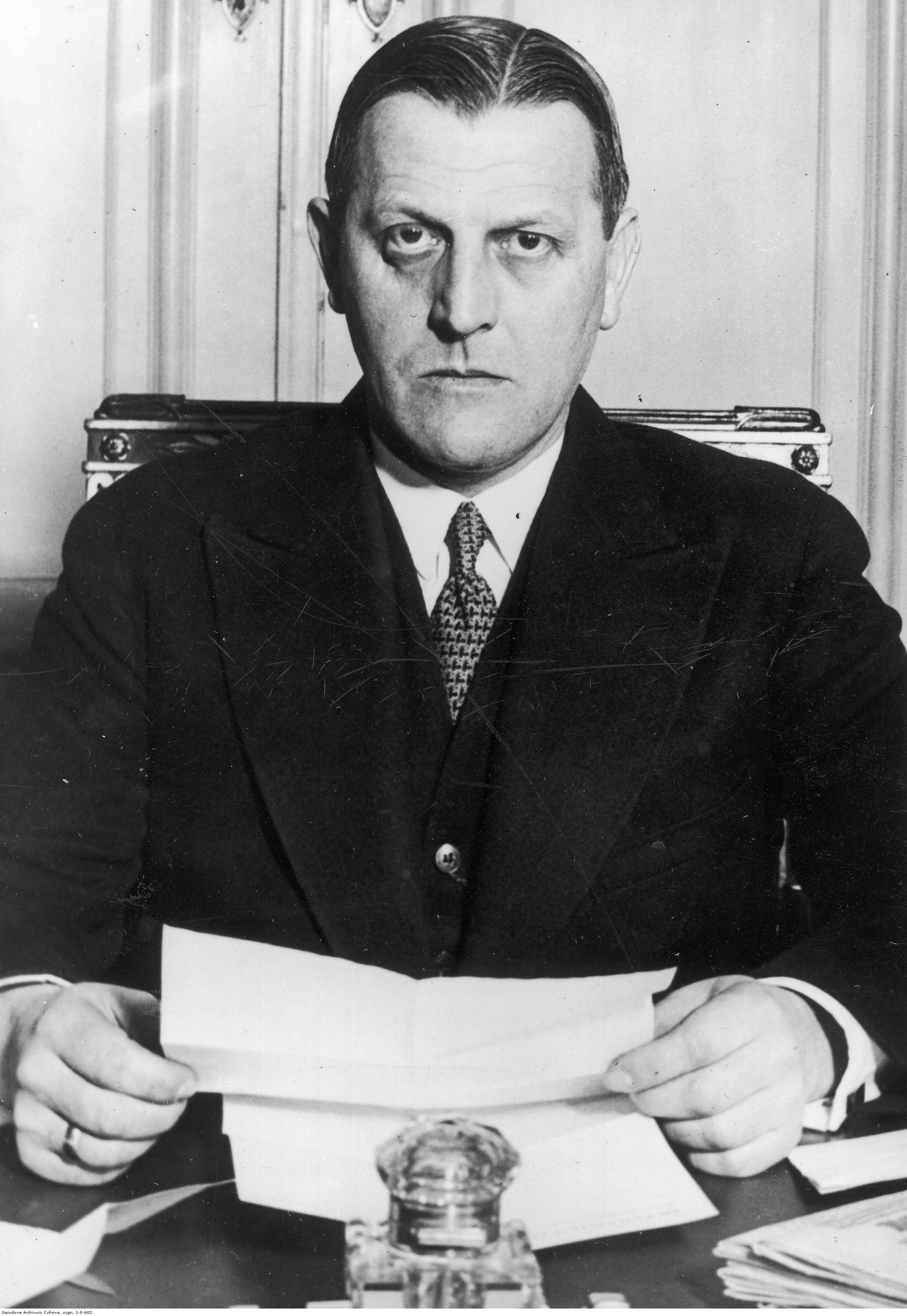

Vice-Chancellor of Austria
- In office 21 September 1933 – 1 May 1934
- Chancellor: Engelbert Dollfuß
- Preceded by: Franz Winkler
- Succeeded by: Ernst Rüdiger Starhemberg

Minister of the Interior
- In office 30 July 1934 – 29 October 1935
- Chancellor: Kurt Schuschnigg
- Preceded by: Robert Kerber
- Succeeded by: Eduard Baar-Baarenfels

Personal details
- Born: 23 March 1886 Vienna, Austria-Hungary
- Died: 16 March 1938 (aged 51) Vienna, Nazi Germany
- Party: Heimatblock; Christian Social Party; Fatherland's Front
- Profession: Military

Emil Fey (23 March 1886 – 16 March 1938) was an officer in the Austro-Hungarian Army, leader of the right-wing paramilitary Heimwehr forces and politician of the First Austrian Republic. He served as Vice-Chancellor of Austria (German: Vizekanzler) from 1933 to 1934, leading the country into the period of the Ständestaat under Chancellor Engelbert Dollfuß. Fey played a vital role in the violent suppression of the Republikanischer Schutzbund (Republican Protection League) and, during the 1934 Austrian Civil War, of the Social Democratic Workers' Party.

== Life ==
A career officer since 1908, Fey in the rank of a major fought with the Common Army in World War I and was awarded the Military Order of Maria Theresa in 1916. After the war, he joined the Carinthian paramilitary Heimwehr forces against the Yugoslavian troops. In 1927 he founded a local Heimwehr branch in Vienna and became a member of the conservative Christian Social Party. As his political career proceeded, he increasingly rivalled with Heimwehr leader Ernst Rüdiger Starhemberg; both commanders backed the rise of Chancellor Dollfuß and his successor Kurt Schuschnigg, only to be largely disempowered after the implementation of the authoritarian Federal State of Austria (Ständestaat).

On 17 October 1932 Fey joined Dollfuß' cabinet in the rank of a state secretary concerned with public security. He immediately had all conventions of the Social Democrats, the Communists and the Austrian Nazis banned. After the chancellor had suspended the sessions of the National Council, Fey on 15 March 1933 concentrated Heimwehr forces to occupy the Austrian Parliament Building, however, any operation was aborted by the Vienna police. During a parade in May 1933, Major Fey reportedly "knocked three Nazis unconscious with his own ochsenknüttel" (square-edged bludgeon) and promoted Austrian nationalism.

Chancellor Dollfuß made him his deputy on 21 September 1933. Fey continued the search for weapons belonging to the Republikanischer Schutzbund, which had been banned in March 1933. The resistance of the Schutzbund to a government search for weapons at the headquarters of its Linz branch on 12 February 1934 sparked the Austrian Civil War. Dollfuß mistrusted Fey's capabilities and on 1 May he lost his office of vice-chancellor to his bitter rival Starhemberg. During the July Putsch and Dollfuß' assassination he stayed in the background, later accusations of collaboration with the Nazis have never been conclusively established. He once again joined the Schuschnigg cabinet as Minister for Interior until his final disempowerment in 1935, then shunting off to the Donaudampfschiffahrtsgesellschaft.

Upon the Anschluss annexation of Austria by Nazi Germany, Fey was interrogated by Gestapo agents on 15 March 1938. Harassed, he returned home, summoned his 46-year-old wife Malvine and his son Herbert, and wrote an appeal for help to the former Vice-Chancellor Edmund Glaise-Horstenau. Without awaiting the answer, he shot his family and himself in the early morning of the following day. Contemporany sources claimed that Fey's wife was a Jew who converted to Christianity, and the fear of Nazi racial persecution of his wife and son led him to commit the murders.
