= Ludwig Bernaschek =

Austrian Schutzbund leader and politician

Ludwig Bernaschek (May 15, 1899, Budapest – May 31, 1970, Linz) was an Austrian Schutzbund leader and politician for the Social Democratic Party of Austria (SDAPÖ).

== Life ==
Bernaschek was the youngest of four siblings (Aurelia, Margarethe, and Richard) in a social-democratic working-class family. From 1900, the family lived in Linz, where he attended elementary, middle, and technical schools. During his youth, Bernaschek became involved in the socialist movement. At the age of 17, he became the leader of the socialist youth workers in Linz. In 1917, he became a soldier and a social democratic representative for soldiers in the military union.

In 1925, he ran as a candidate for the provincial parliament in the Linz district but was not elected. During the February struggles of 1934, Bernaschek was arrested since he was in charge of the material department of the Schutzbund. He was charged and "sentenced to twelve years of severe imprisonment for high treason." In 1936, he was granted amnesty and took over a radio business as an independent merchant.

After World War II, Bernaschek became a member of the provincial governments Gleißner III to Gleißner VIII, overseeing municipal affairs, administrative police, and auditing. He also served as the deputy governor from October 1945 to July 1969. The peak of his political career was the provincial election of 1967, in which he, as the regional chairman of the Social Democratic Party, secured the relative majority.

Bernaschek had been a member of the lodge "Gleichheit" (Equality) since 1948 and a founding member of the lodge "Zu den 7 Weisen" (To the 7 Sages) in 1950.

In 2013, the Vienna Regional Court officially overturned the high treason conviction.

== Awards ==
- 1958: Decoration of Honour for Services to the Republic of Austria (June 10)
- 1960: Grand Decoration of Honor in Gold with Star for Services to the Republic of Austria
