= Federal State of Austria =

Austrian state from 1934 to 1938

Federal State of Austria Bundesstaat Österreich
- 1934–1938
- Flag Coat of arms
- Anthem: Sei gesegnet ohne Ende (English: "Be Blessed Without End")
- The Federal State of Austria in 1938
- Capital: Vienna
- Common languages: German (Note: Austrian German)
- Religion: Roman Catholicism
- Demonym: Austrian
- Government: Federal authoritarian (Note: Whether the ständestaat was fascist remains a debated topic, with "the consensus view in Austrian historiography [being] that the state was just authoritarian, rather than fascist".) corporate state
- President
  - 1934–1938: Wilhelm Miklas
- Chancellor
  - 1934: Engelbert Dollfuss
  - 1934: Ernst Rüdiger Starhemberg (acting)
  - 1934–1938: Kurt Schuschnigg
  - 1938: Arthur Seyss-Inquart
- Legislature: None (Note: The last legislative election took place in 1930.)
- Historical era: Interwar period
  - May Constitution: 1 May 1934
  - Killing of Dollfuss: 25 July 1934
  - Berchtesgaden agreement: 12 February 1938
  - Anschluss: 13 March 1938

Area
  - Total: 83,879 km^{2} (32,386 sq mi)
- Currency: Austrian schilling
Preceded by	Succeeded by
First Austrian Republic	State of Austria
- Today part of: Austria

The Federal State of Austria (German: Bundesstaat Österreich; colloquially known as the "Ständestaat") was a continuation of the First Austrian Republic between 1934 and 1938 when it was a one-party state led by the conservative, nationalist, corporatist and Catholic Fatherland Front. The Ständestaat concept, derived from the notion of Stände ("estates" or "corporations"), was advocated by leading regime politicians such as Engelbert Dollfuss and Kurt Schuschnigg. The result was an authoritarian government based on a mix of Italian Fascist and conservative Catholic influences.

It ended in March 1938 with the Anschluss, the German annexation of Austria. Austria would not become an independent country again until 1955, when the Austrian State Treaty ended the Allied occupation of Austria.

== History ==
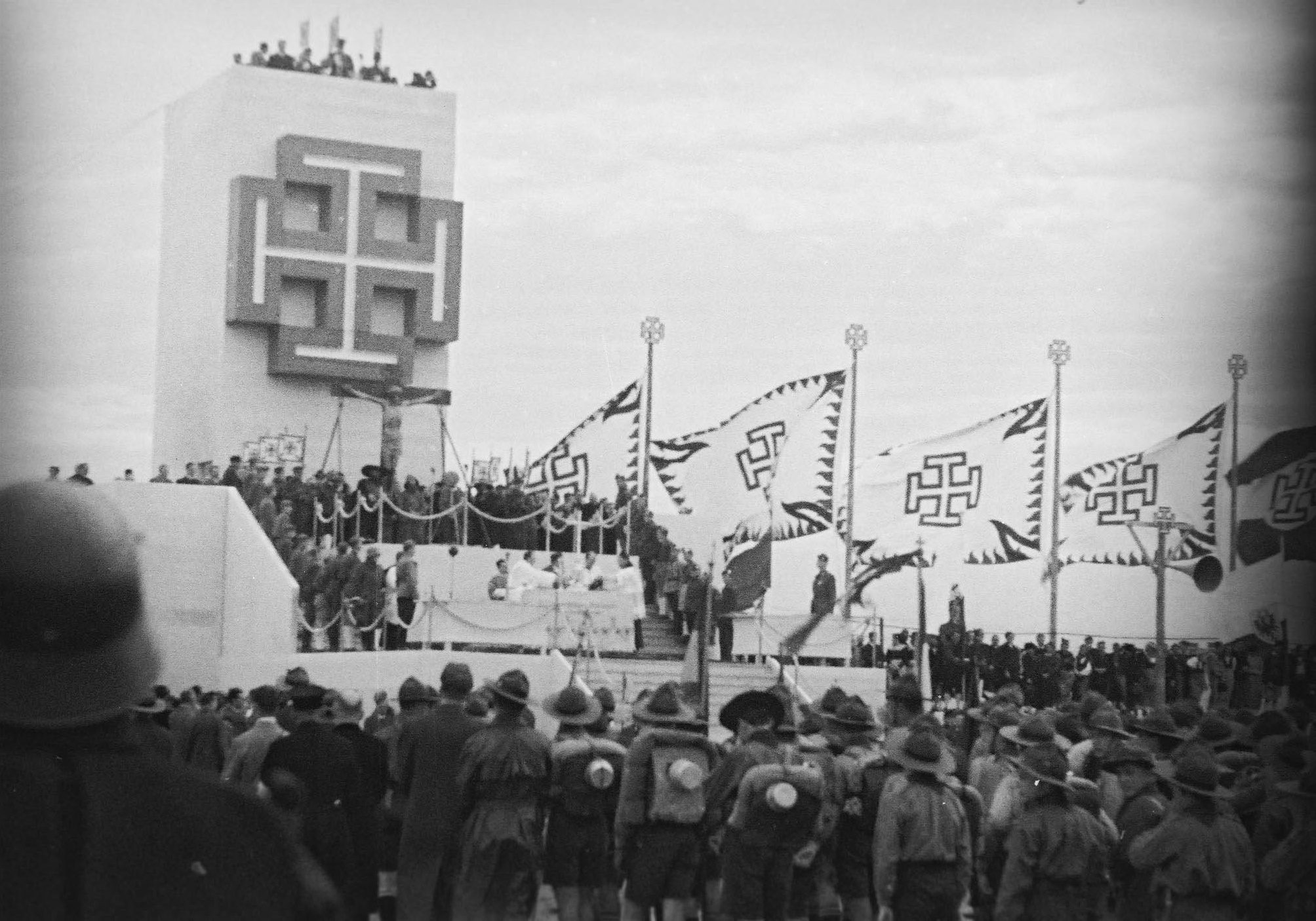
Fatherland Front rally in 1936

In the 1890s, the founding members of the conservative-clerical Christian Social Party (CS) like Karl von Vogelsang and the Vienna mayor Karl Lueger had already developed anti-liberal views, though primarily from an economic perspective considering the pauperization of the proletariat and the lower middle class. Strongly referring to the doctrine of Catholic social teaching, the CS agitated against the Austrian labour movement led by the Social Democratic Party of Austria.

=== Self-coup ===
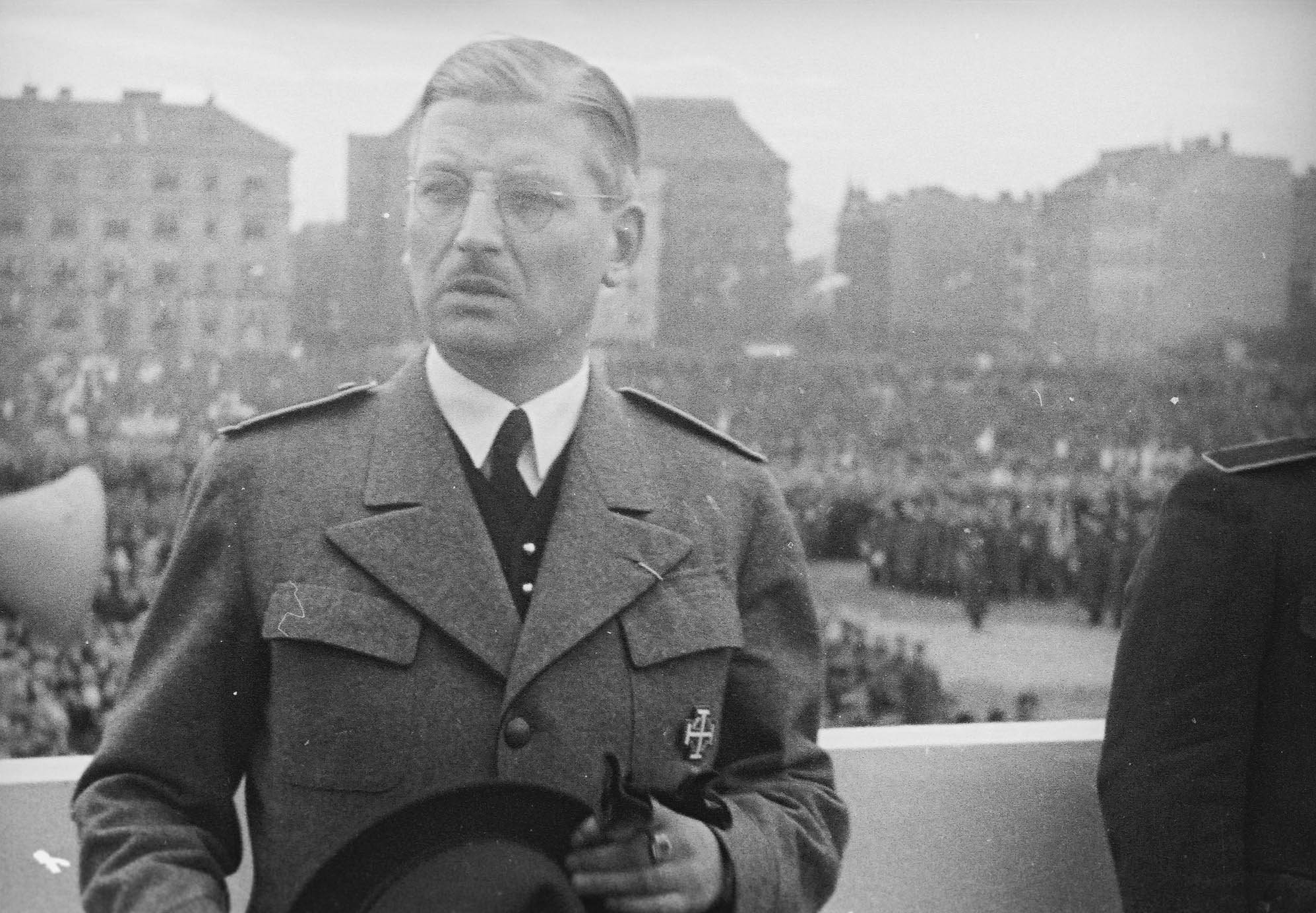
Kurt Schuschnigg in 1936

During the Great Depression in the First Austrian Republic of the early 1930s, the CS on the basis of the Quadragesimo anno encyclical issued by Pope Pius XI in 1931 pursued the idea of overcoming the ongoing class struggle by the implementation of a corporative form of government modelled on Italian fascism and Portugal's Estado Novo. The CS politician Engelbert Dollfuss appointed Chancellor of Austria in 1932, on 4 March 1933 saw an opportunity in the resignation of Social Democrat Karl Renner as president of the Austrian Nationalrat, after irregularities occurred during a voting process. Dollfuss called the incident a "self-elimination" (Selbstausschaltung) of the parliament and had the following meeting on 15 March forcibly prorogued by the forces of the Vienna police department. Dolfuss then seized emergency powers under the "Wartime Economy Authority Law," a World War I-era emergency law that empowered the government to issue emergency decrees if it deemed such decrees necessary to protect the economy. In effect, Dollfuss seized dictatorial powers. His fellow CS party member, President Wilhelm Miklas did not take any action to restore democracy.

Dollfuss then banned the Communist Party on 26 May 1933, the Social Democratic Republikanischer Schutzbund paramilitary organization on 30 May and the Austrian branch of the Nazi Party on 19 June. On 20 May 1933 he had established the Fatherland's Front as a unity party of "an autonomous, Christian, German, corporative Federal State of Austria". On 12 February 1934 the government's attempts to enforce the ban of the Schutzbund at the Hotel Schiff in Linz sparked the Austrian Civil War. The revolt was suppressed with support by the Bundesheer and right-wing Heimwehr troops under Ernst Rüdiger Starhemberg, and ended with the ban of the Social Democratic Party and the trade unions.

The path to dictatorship was completed on 1 May 1934, when the Constitution of Austria was recast into a severely authoritarian and corporatist document by a rump National Council. Direct parliamentary elections were abolished. Instead, deputies were nominated by four non-elective, corporatist-styled councils – the State Council (Staatsrat), Federal Culture Council (Bundeskulturrat), Federal Economic Council (Bundeswirtschaftsrat), and the States' Council (Länderrat). In practice, however, all governing power was now in Dollfuss' hands.

Dollfuss continued to rule under what amounted to martial law until his assassination on 25 July 1934 during the Nazi July Putsch. Although the coup d'état initially had the encouragement of Hitler, it was quickly suppressed and Dollfuss's education minister, Kurt Schuschnigg, succeeded him. Hitler officially denied any involvement in the failed coup, but he continued to destabilise the Austrian state by secretly supporting Nazi sympathisers like Arthur Seyss-Inquart and Edmund Glaise-Horstenau. In turn Austria under Schuschnigg sought the backing of its southern neighbour, the fascist Italian dictator Benito Mussolini. Tables turned after the Second Italo-Abyssinian War of 1935–36, when Mussolini, internationally isolated, approached Hitler. Though Schuschnigg tried to improve relations with Nazi Germany by giving amnesty to several Austrian Nazis and accepting them in the Fatherland's Front, he had no chance to prevail against the "axis" of Berlin and Rome proclaimed by Mussolini on 1 November 1936.

One of the reasons for the failure of the putsch was Italian intervention: Mussolini assembled an army corps of four divisions on the Austrian border and threatened Hitler with a war with Italy in the event of a German invasion of Austria as originally planned, should the coup have been more successful. Support for the Nazi movement in Austria was surpassed only by that in Germany, allegedly amounting to 75% in some areas.

== Ideology ==
Flag of the Fatherland Front.

The Federal State of Austria glorified the history of Austria and partially built on the Habsburg myth. The Habsburg Monarchy was elevated as a time of greatness in Austrian history. The Catholic Church played a large role in the nation's definition of Austrian history and identity, alienating German culture. Unlike Hitler's regime, the Catholic Church was given a prominent voice in a variety of issues. The state de-secularized schools in education, requiring religious education to complete the Matura graduation exams. According to this ideology, Austrians were the "better Germans". In keeping with the regime's Catholicism, the regime elevated the non-communist and non-capitalist teachings of Papal Encyclicals, most prominently Quadragesimo anno of Pope Pius XI.

A key feature of the Ständestaat was its implementation of austerity measures. The Federal State aimed to reduce unnecessary spending and foster a society that embraced a more straightforward way of living, aligning with its Catholic belief in living modestly for God and family. This approach was a response to the encroachment of consumerism in neighboring countries like Czechoslovakia, which threatened traditional values. The Ständestaat saw it as a method to trim excess, combat superficial consumerism, and promote a devout and ascetic lifestyle in service of God. Despite having Ludwig von Mises as an economic advisor, there is no convincing evidence that his Laissez-faire policy was implemented in Austria.

The Federal State pursued harsh deflationary policies to balance the currency. It also cut spending drastically, and high interest rates were the norm. The budget deficit was slashed from over 200 million shillings to less than 50 million. By 1936, only 50% of the unemployed were receiving unemployment benefits. These policies coincided with a catastrophic economic contraction. According to Angus Maddison's estimates, unemployment peaked at 26% in 1933, failing to fall under 20% until 1937. This can be contrasted with German unemployment, which peaked at 30% in 1932 and had fallen to less than 5% by 1937. Additionally, real GDP collapsed, not returning to pre-1929 levels until 1937.

Whether the Federal State could be considered genuinely fascist is debatable. Although it was authoritarian and used fascist-like symbols, it never achieved broad support among Austrians. Its most prominent policy was an embrace of Catholicism, and its economic and social policies bear only a passing resemblance to those of Fascist Italy and Nazi Germany and more of a resemblance to Portugal under Salazar.

== Civil rights ==
John Gunther wrote in 1940 that the state "assaulted the rights of citizens in a fantastic manner", noting that in 1934 the police raided 106,000 homes in Vienna and made 38,141 arrests of Nazis, social democrats, liberals and communists. He added, however:

But—and it was an important "but"—the terror never reached anything like the repressive force of the Nazi terror. Most of those arrested promptly got out of jail again. Even at its most extreme phase, it was difficult to take the Schuschnigg dictatorship completely seriously, although Schutzbunders tried in 1935 got mercilessly severe sentences. This was because of Austrian gentleness, Austrian genius for compromise, Austrian love for cloudy legal abstractions, and Austrian Schlamperei.

== Anschluss ==
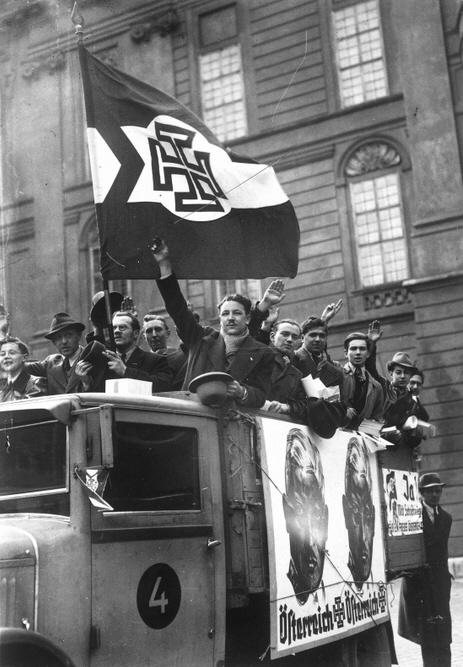
Truck with supporters of Schuschnigg (pictured on the posters) campaigning for the continued independence of Austria, March 1938 (shortly before the Anschluss)

According to the Hossbach Memorandum, Hitler in November 1937 declared his plans for an Austrian campaign in a meeting with Wehrmacht commanders. Under the mediation of the German ambassador Franz von Papen, Schuschnigg on 12 February 1938 traveled to Hitler's Berghof residence in Berchtesgaden, only to be confronted with an ultimatum to readmit the Nazi Party and to appoint Seyss-Inquart and Glaise-Horstenau ministers of the Austrian cabinet. Schuschnigg, impressed by the presence of OKW chief General Wilhelm Keitel, gave in and on 16 February Seyss-Inquart became head of the strategically important Austrian interior ministry.

After the British ambassador to Berlin, Nevile Henderson on 3 March 1938 had stated that the German claims to Austria were justified, Schuschnigg started a last attempt to retain Austrian autonomy by scheduling a nationwide referendum on 13 March. As part of his effort to ensure victory, he released the Social Democratic leaders from prison and gained their support in return for dismantling the one-party state and legalizing the socialist trade unions. Hitler reacted with the mobilization of Wehrmacht troops at the Austrian border and demanded the appointment of Seyss-Inquart as Austrian chancellor. On 11 March Austrian Nazis stormed the Federal Chancellery and forced Schuschnigg to resign. Seyss-Inquart was sworn in as his successor by Miklas and the next day Wehrmacht troops crossed the border meeting no resistance.

Hitler had originally intended to retain Austria as a puppet state headed by Seyss-Inquart. However, the enthusiastic support for Hitler led him to change his stance and support a full Anschluss between Austria and Nazi Germany. On 13 March Seyss-Inquart formally decreed the Anschluss, though President Miklas avoided signing the law by resigning immediately, only for Seyss-Inquart to take over as acting President and sign the Anschluss bill into law. Two days later in his speech on the Heldenplatz in Vienna, Hitler proclaimed the "accession of my homeland to the German Reich". A highly dubious referendum – organized and implemented by Josef Bürckel, the Nazi Gauleiter of the Pfalz and the Saarland, who was appointed by Hitler to be in charge of the election – was held on 10 April, ratifying the Anschluss with an implausible 99.73% of votes. Hundreds of thousands of "undesirable" Austrians – 18% of the population – were removed from the voter lists due to being Jewish or members of the Social Democratic party, which opposed the Nazis, and were therefore unable to vote.
