= Palace of Justice, Vienna =

Historic building in Vienna, Austria which seats the Austrian Supreme Court

Coordinates: 48°12′23″N 16°21′26″E

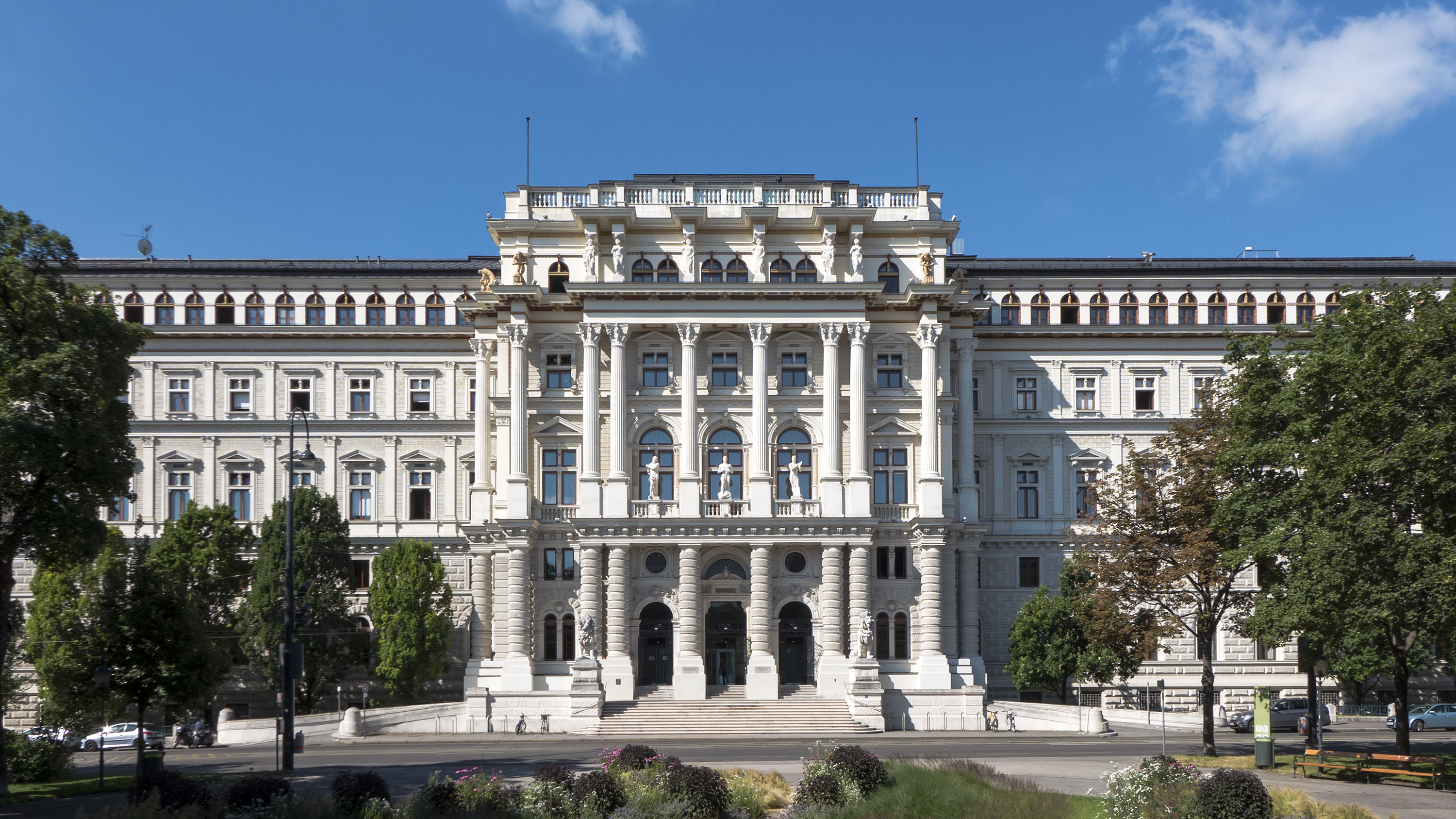
Palace of Justice

The Palace of Justice (German: Justizpalast) is the seat of the Supreme Court (Oberster Gerichtshof) of Austria. The Neo-Renaissance building erected from 1875 to 1881 is located in the Austrian capital Vienna on Schmerlingplatz, a square near the Ringstraße boulevard in the central district of Innere Stadt. In addition to the Supreme Court, the Palace of Justice houses the Higher Regional Court of Vienna and the Regional Court for Civil Matters Vienna and the General Prosecution and the Supreme Public Prosecutor for Vienna.

== History ==
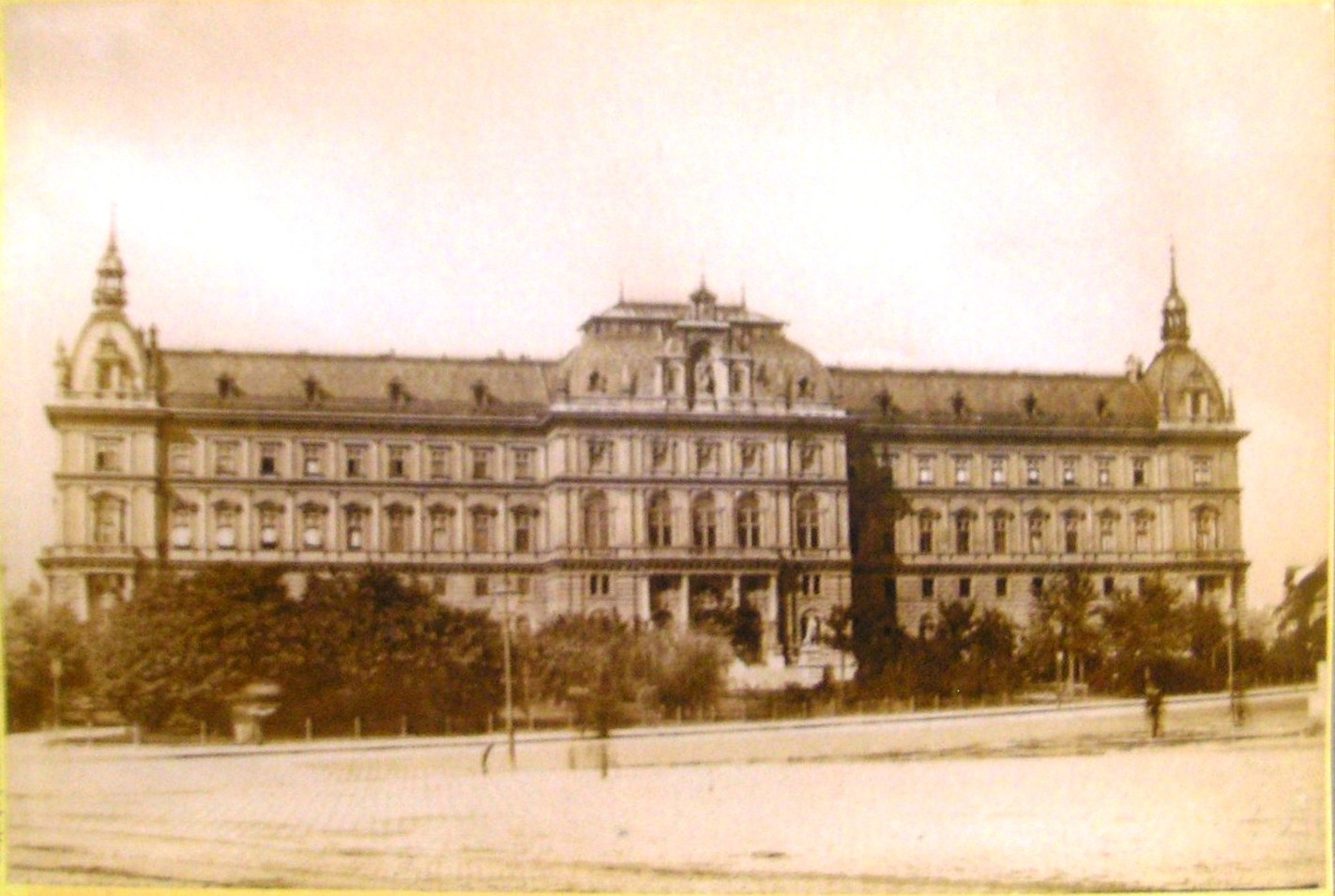
The Palace in 1881

The building was projected by the Historicist architect Alexander Wielemans von Monteforte (1843–1911) as the new residence of the Supreme Court established in the course of the 1848 revolutions and headed by President Anton von Schmerling since 1865.

In the Austrian July Revolt of 1927, violent demonstrations took place after a jury had acquitted several nationalist paramilitaries who during an armed conflict with Social Democratic Schutzbund members in Schattendorf had shot a disabled World War I veteran and an eight-year-old child. In the morning of July 15 numerous protesters gathered in front of the Austrian Parliament Building but were pushed towards Schmerlingplatz by the mounted police force. Several demonstrators broke into the ground-floor rooms and began to demolish furniture and files. At about half past twelve, the Palace was set on fire. During their attempts to extinguish the fire the Vienna firefighters were attacked, hoses were cut and hydrants ran out of water. The fire rapidly spread out all over the building and it took until the early morning to get it under control.

Between 1929 and 1931 the palace was restored with significant modifications of the façade and the addition of a new level. The restoration, in a historicist style, was carried out by Viennese architects Heinrich Ried and Alfred Keller.

In a sweeping general renovation in 2007, the Palace was forced to meet both the stringent requirements of monument protection as well as those of a modern office in order to provide proper service to litigants.

== See also ==
- Ministry of Justice (Austria)
