= First Austrian Republic =

Austrian state from 1919 to 1934

Coordinates: 48°12′N 16°22′E

Republic of Austria Republik Österreich
- 1919–1934
- Flag Coat of arms
- Anthem: Deutschösterreich, du herrliches Land "German-Austria, you wonderful country" (1920–1929) Sei gesegnet ohne Ende (English: "Be Blessed Without End") (1929–1934)
- The First Austrian Republic in 1930
- Capital and largest city: Vienna
- Common languages: German (Austrian German)
- Religion: Christianity (Catholic, Eastern Orthodox, Protestant), Judaism
- Demonym: Austrian
- Government: Federal parliamentary republic
- President
  - 1919–1920: Karl Seitz
  - 1920–1928: Michael Hainisch
  - 1928–1934: Wilhelm Miklas
- Chancellor
  - 1919–1920 (first): Karl Renner
  - 1932–1934 (last): Engelbert Dollfuss
- Legislature: Parliament
  - Upper chamber: Federal Council
  - Lower chamber: National Council
- Historical era: Interwar period
  - Treaty of St Germain: 10 September 1919
  - July Revolt: 15 July 1927
  - Self-elimination of the Austrian Parliament: 4–15 March 1933
  - Austrian Civil War: 12–15 February 1934
  - May Constitution: 1 May 1934
- Currency: Austrian krone (1919–1924); Austrian schilling (1924–1938)
Preceded by	Succeeded by
Republic of German-Austria	Federal State of Austria
- Today part of: Austria

The First Austrian Republic (German: Erste Österreichische Republik), officially the Republic of Austria, was created after the signing of the Treaty of Saint-Germain-en-Laye on 10 September 1919—the settlement after the end of World War I which ended the Habsburg rump state of Republic of German-Austria—and ended with the establishment of the authoritarian Federal State of Austria based upon a dictatorship of Engelbert Dollfuss and the Fatherland Front in 1934. The Republic's constitution was enacted on 1 October 1920 and amended on 7 December 1929. The republican period was increasingly marked by violent strife between those with left-wing and right-wing views, leading to the July Revolt of 1927 and the Austrian Civil War of 1934.

== Foundation ==
Lands claimed by German-Austria in 1918

In September 1919, the rump state of German-Austria—now effectively reduced to the Alpine and Danubian crownlands of the Austrian Empire—was given reduced borders by the Treaty of Saint Germain, which ceded German-populated regions in Sudetenland to Czechoslovakia, German-populated South Tyrol to Italy and a portion of the Alpine provinces to the Kingdom of Serbs, Croats and Slovenes (Kraljevina Srba, Hrvata i Slovenaca, or SHS, also known as Yugoslavia). Despite Austrian protests this treaty also forbade Anschluss, or union of Austria with Germany, without League of Nations consent. The Allies were not willing to allow a defeated Germany to expand its borders by absorbing what remained of Austria. With this route closed, German-Austria changed its official name to the Republic of Austria.

The new state managed to block two land claims by its neighbours. The first was the south-eastern part of Carinthia, which was inhabited partly by Slovenians. It was prevented from being taken over by the new SHS state through a Carinthian plebiscite on October 10, 1920, in which the majority of the population chose to remain with Austria. The second denied land claim was Hungary's claim to Burgenland, which, under the name "Western Hungary", had been part of the Hungarian kingdom since 907. It was inhabited mostly by a German-speaking population, but also had Croat- and Hungarian-speaking minorities. Through the Treaty of St. Germain it became part of the Austrian Republic in 1921. However, after a plebiscite which was disputed by Austria, the provincial capital city of Sopron (German Ödenburg) remained in Hungary.

The Treaty of Saint Germain angered the German population in Austria, who claimed that it violated the Fourteen Points laid out by United States President Woodrow Wilson during peace talks, specifically the right to "self-determination" of all nations. Many of them felt that with the loss of over 70% of the Cisleithanian territory of the prewar empire, Austria was no longer economically and politically viable as a separate state without union with Germany. Austria now found itself a small, landlocked country of about 6.5 million people, with 4 million Austrian Germans excluded from the new state and instead being placed against their declared will under Czechoslovak, Italian, and Yugoslav rule. Vienna, with its population of almost 2 million, was left as an imperial capital without an empire to feed it. Only 17.8 percent of Austria's land was arable; the vast majority of the arable land in the former Austrian half of the empire was now part of Czechoslovakia or Yugoslavia.

== Government and politics, 1920–1934 ==
The new constitution created a bicameral legislature with the upper house—the Federal Council—formed by representatives from federal states, and the lower house—the National Council—to which deputies were elected in universal elections. The Federal President was elected for a four-year term in a full session of both houses, while the Chancellor was elected by the National Council. As no political party ever gained a parliamentary majority, Austria was governed by coalitions of the conservative Christian Social Party and the right-wing Greater German People's Party or Landbund which were more conservative than the first government of Social Democrat Karl Renner of 1919–20, which had established a number of progressive socioeconomic and labour laws.

After 1920, Austria's government was dominated by the anti-Anschluss Christian Social Party, which retained close ties with the Roman Catholic Church. The party's first Chancellor Ignaz Seipel came to power in May 1922 and attempted to forge a political alliance between wealthy industrialists and the Roman Catholic Church.

After the legislative elections of October 17, 1920, the Social Democrats lost the parliamentary majority and remained in the opposition until 1934, when they were banned by Dollfuss. The Christian Socials won 85, Social Democrats 69, Greater Germany Party 20 and Peasants Union 8 seats. Michael Hainisch was elected Federal President. After the October 1923 elections Ignaz Seipel stayed in power, but resigned in November 1924 and was succeeded by Rudolf Ramek.

In December 1928 the Christian Social Wilhelm Miklas was elected to the post of Federal President, and on 7 December 1929 the Constitution was amended, reducing the rights of the Parliament, making the Federal President electable by a popular vote and giving him the right to appoint the federal government and to issue emergency laws.

After the 1930 legislative elections the Social Democrats emerged as the largest party with 72 seats, but Christian Social Chancellor Otto Ender created a coalition government without them.

=== Left–right clashes ===
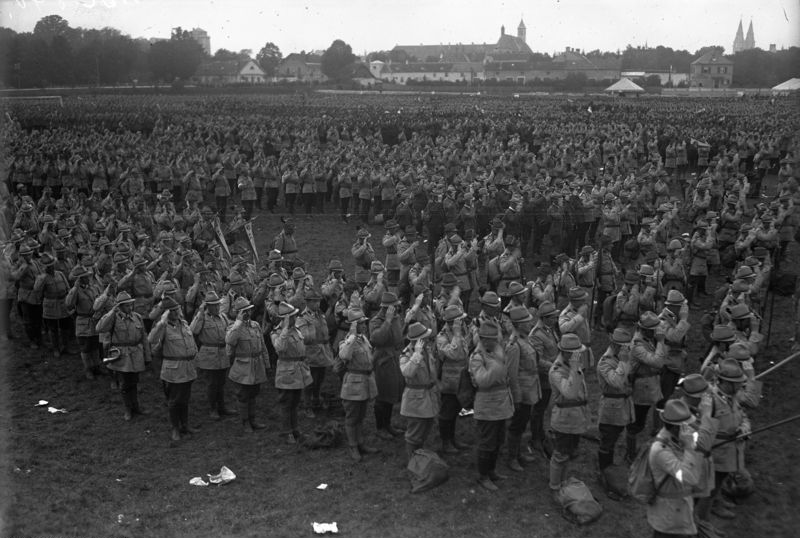
Heimwehr parade, 1928

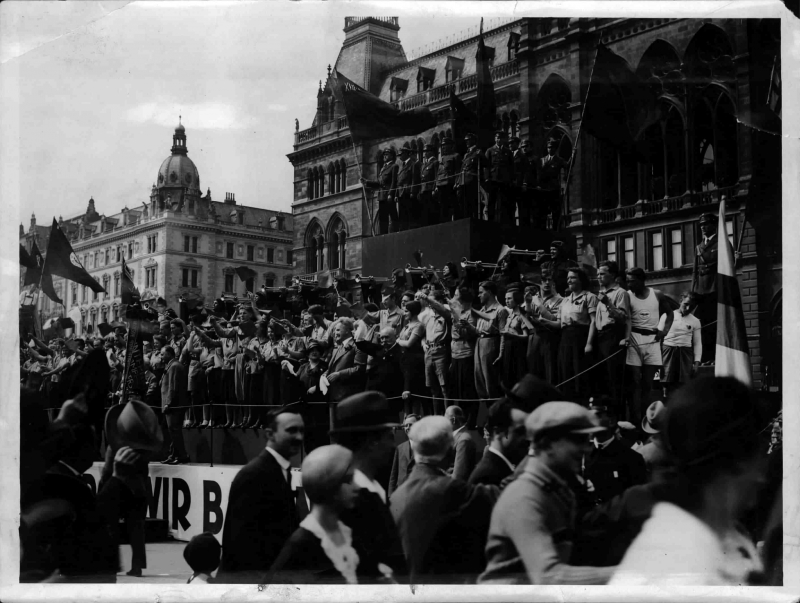
Social Democrats celebrating 1 May 1932

Despite the nation having a steady political party in power, the politics of the nation were fractious and violent, with both Social Democrat (Republikanischer Schutzbund) and right-wing (Heimwehr) political paramilitary forces clashing with each other. The country was divided between the conservative countryside population and Red Vienna controlled by the Social Democrats.

In 1927, during a political clash in Schattendorf, an old man and a child were shot and killed by the Heimwehr. On 14 July 1927 the shooters were acquitted, and left-wing supporters began a massive protest, during which the Ministry of Justice building was burned. To restore order, the police and army shot and killed 89 people and injured 600. This huge protest is known as the July Revolt of 1927. Social Democrats called for a general strike, which lasted four days.

After the 1927 events, the conservative elements became stronger and the violence in Austria continued to escalate until the early 1930s, when Engelbert Dollfuss became Chancellor.

== Economy ==
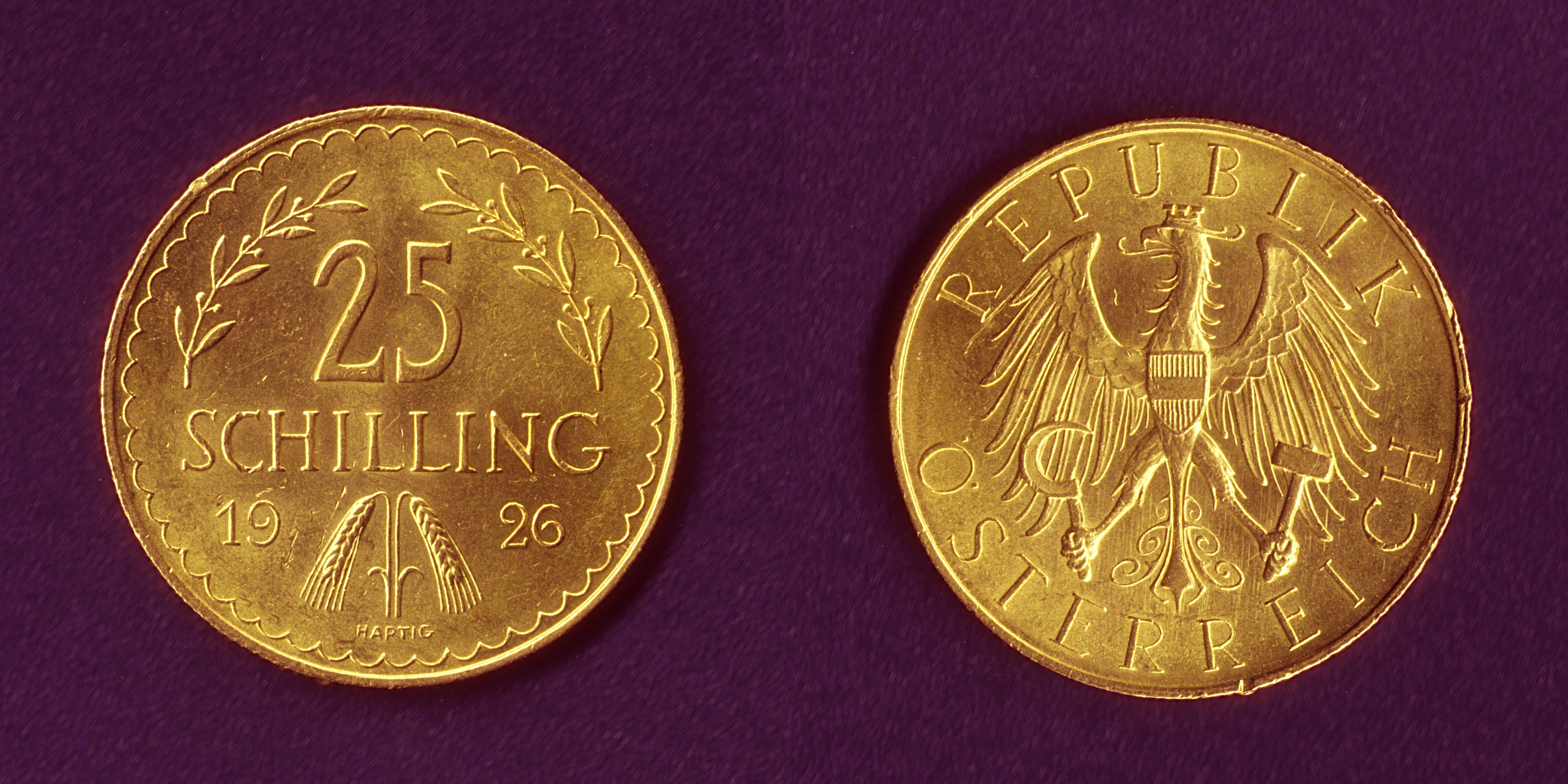
25-schilling gold coin, .900 fine

The new state was difficult to control, as much of the former empire's important economic regions had been taken away with the foundation of new nation-states. The matter was further complicated because a number of these new nation-states were still dependent on Vienna's banks, but business was hampered by the newly erected borders and tariffs.

The landlocked Austria was barely able to support itself with food, and lacked a developed industrial basis. In addition, Czechoslovakia, Hungary, Yugoslavia and Italy had imposed a trade blockade and refused to sell food and coal to Austria, which eventually was saved by aid and support from the Western Allies. By 1922 one US dollar was worth 19,000 Kronen and half the population was unemployed.

In December 1921 the Treaty of Lana between Austria and Czechoslovakia was signed, in which Austria recognized the new state borders and relinquished claims to represent ethnic Germans living on the territory of the newly created Czechoslovakia. In return Czechoslovakia provided a loan of 500 million Kronen to Austria.

In 1922, in an effort to deal with post-war inflation, Chancellor Ignaz Seipel asked for foreign loans and introduced austerity policies. In October 1922 Britain, France, Italy and Czechoslovakia provided a loan of 650 million gold Kronen after Seipel promised not to attempt Anschluss with Germany for the next 20 years and allowed the League of Nations to control Austria's economy. During the next two years the state budget was stabilized and international supervision of finances ended in March 1926. In 1923, Austria's central bank Oesterreichische Nationalbank was re-established and a sales tax was introduced, and in December 1924 the Austrian schilling replaced the Krone.

The Great Depression hit Austria hard, and in May 1931 the largest bank in Austria, Creditanstalt Bank, collapsed. To improve its economy, Austria wanted to conclude a customs union with Germany, but in 1931 this was denied by France and the countries of the Little Entente.

== The Fatherland Front ==
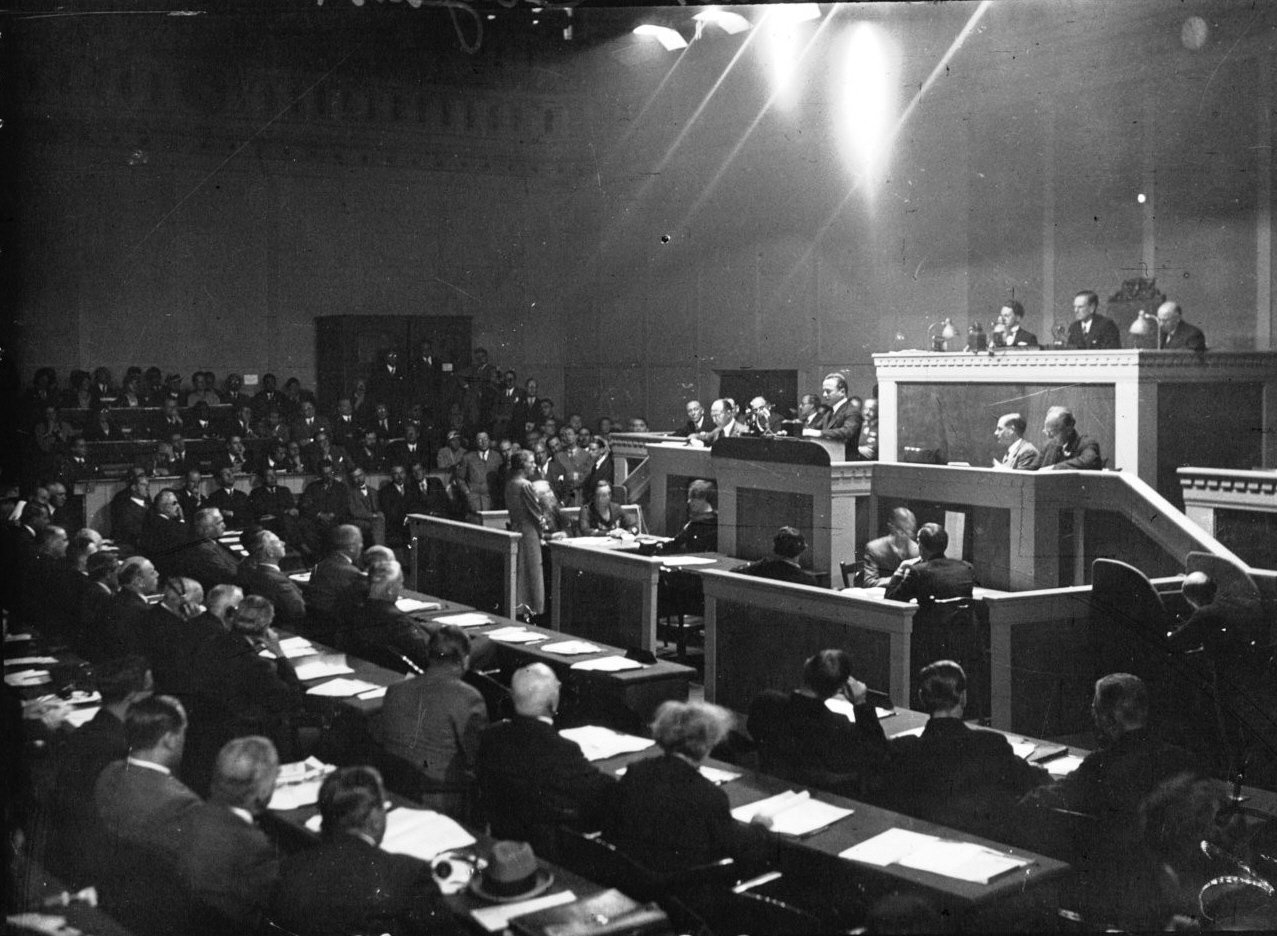
Dollfuss addressing the League of Nations in 1933

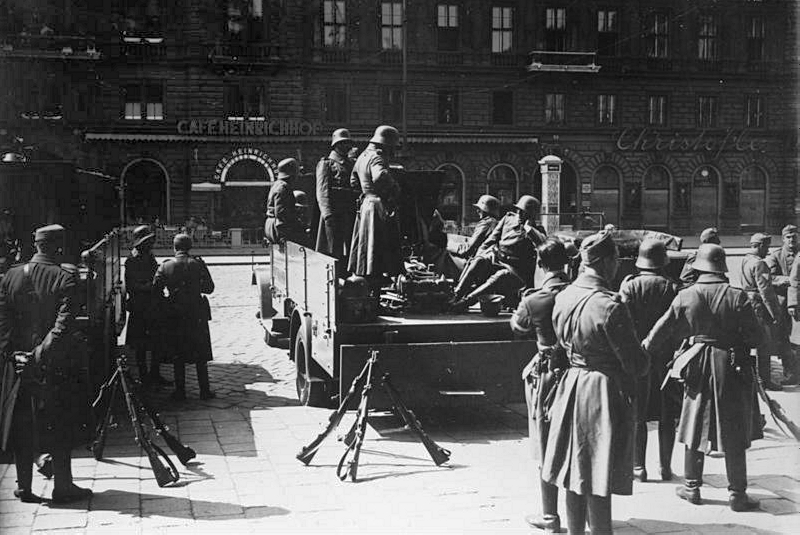
Austrian soldiers during the brief civil war of 1934

Chancellor Engelbert Dollfuss of the Christian Social Party took power in Austria on 20 May 1932, and moved the party and Austria towards dictatorship, and centralisation, in part because fascist Italy was its strongest international ally against Germany. In March 1933, Dollfuss suspended the parliament, which gave him the opportunity to establish an authoritarian government without a parliament. In May 1933 he created the Fatherland Front (German: Vaterländische Front). While appearing fascist to some, it was mostly Catholic and influenced by the papal encyclical Quadragesimo anno of 1931 which refuted liberalism and socialism in favour of corporatism.

The government was in competition with the growing Austrian Nazi party, which wanted Austria to join Germany. Dollfuss's regime tied Austrian identity to the Catholic Church as an argument against a union of Austria with predominantly Protestant Germany.

Political violence escalated into the Austrian Civil War of February 1934, between Social Democrats and government forces. On 1 May 1934, Dollfuss created a one-party state, to be led by the Fatherland Front, with the proclamation of the authoritarian "May Constitution". The name of the country was changed from the "Republic of Austria" to the "Federal State of Austria". The flag, coat of arms and anthem were also changed.

Federalism and the controlling powers of the Federal Council were curtailed, while elections for the National Council were abolished, its members nominated by four non-elective, corporatist-styled councils—the State Council (Staatsrat), Federal Culture Council (Bundeskulturrat), Federal Economic Council (Bundeswirtschaftsrat) and the States' Council (Länderrat), supposedly providing their best opinions on respective areas. In practice all legislation and appointments were exercised from above by the Federal Chancellor's and President's decree.

The state took complete control of employer-employee relations, known as Ständestaat, and began to crack down on pro-Nazi and pro–German-unification sympathizers. The Nazis responded by assassinating Engelbert Dollfuss in the July Putsch of 25 July 1934 (see Maiverfassung 1934).

This assassination by the Austrian Nazis infuriated Austria's neighbour Fascist Italy under dictator Benito Mussolini. Fascist Italy had had good relations with Austria under Dollfuss, and Mussolini suspected German involvement and promised Austria military support if Germany were to invade, as the Nazis had claims on Italian-administered Tyrol. Italy's support helped save Austria from potential annexation in 1934.

The successor to Dollfuss, Kurt Schuschnigg, maintained the ban on Nazi activities, but also banned Austria's national paramilitary force, the Heimwehr, in 1936.
