= July Revolt of 1927 =

Riots in Vienna, First Austrian Republic

July Revolt
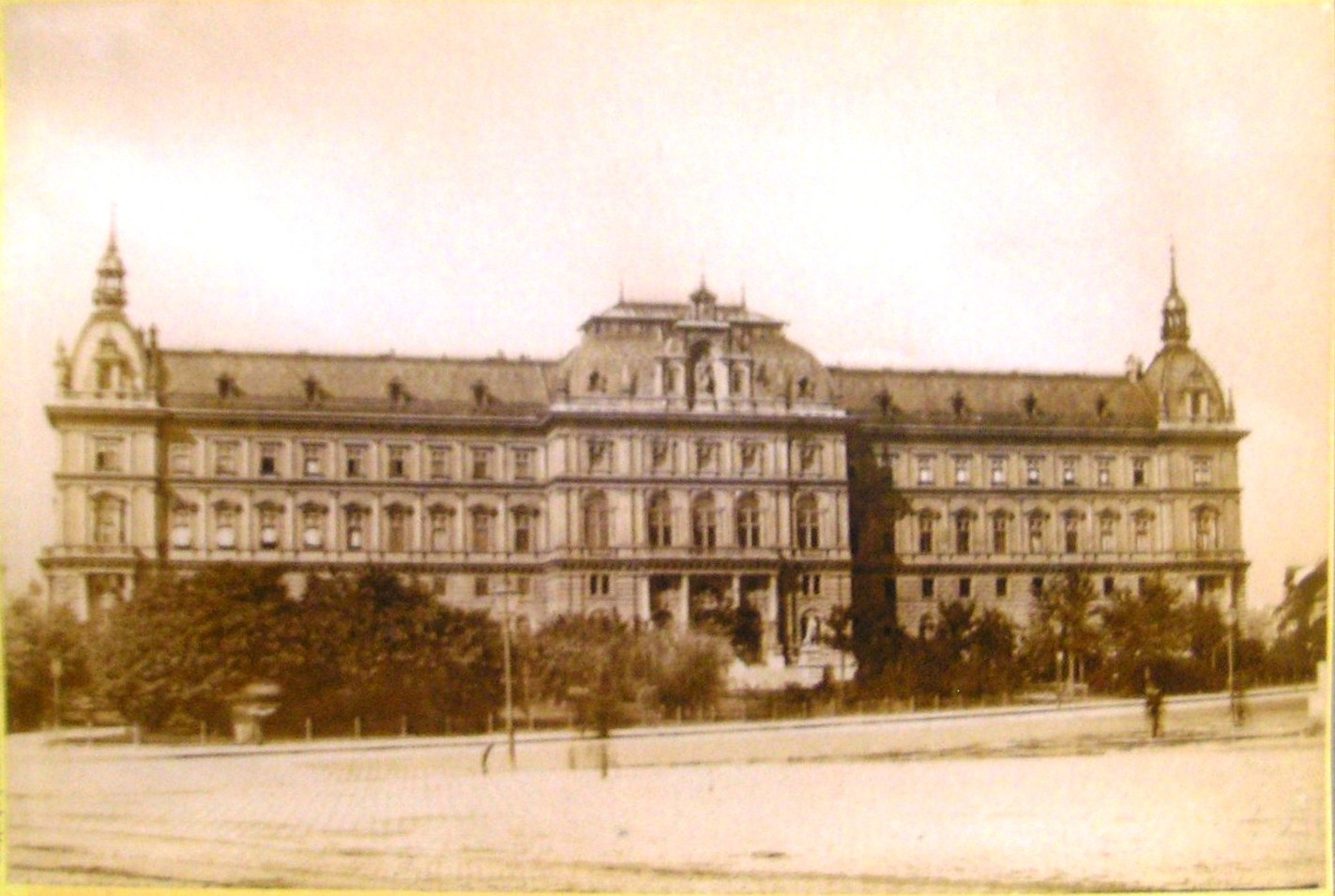
- Vienna Palace of Justice in the 1880s
- Date: 15 July 1927
- Location: Vienna, Austria
- Participants: Austrian Social Democrats
- Outcome: 89 registered deaths, more than 600 seriously injured; General strike without success; Rise of right-wing Heimwehr forces and the extreme right

The July Revolt of 1927 (also known as the Vienna Palace of Justice fire, German: Wiener Justizpalastbrand) was a major riot starting on 15 July 1927 in the Austrian capital, Vienna. The revolt was sparked by the acquittal of three nationalist paramilitary members for the killing of two social democratic Republikanischer Schutzbund members and culminated with police forces firing into the outraged crowd and killing 89 protesters, and five policemen died. More than 600 protestors and around 600 policemen were injured.

== Background ==
The clash was the result of conflict between the Social Democratic Party of Austria and a right-wing alliance including wealthy industrialists and the Catholic Church. Many paramilitary forces had been formed in Austria during the early 1920s such as the nationalist Frontkämpfervereinigung Deutsch-Österreichs under Colonel Hermann Hiltl and the Social Democratic Republikanischer Schutzbund.

== Events ==
=== Schattendorf shooting ===
On 30 January 1927, a Republikanischer Schutzbund group held a demonstration in the town of Schattendorf, in Burgenland. After the demonstration had ended, the Frontkämpfervereinigung Deutsch-Österreichs attacked the Schutzbund members heading back to the train station and injured several and killed Matthias Csmarits, a World War I veteran, and Josef Grössing, an eight-year-old boy.

The shooting provoked significant controversy, with the funeral of the two victims on 2 February being attended by thousands and trade unions declaring a 15 min general strike throughout Austria to mark the funeral. Several months later, on 5 July, the trial of three Frontkämpfervereinigung members who were accused of the shooting began in Vienna. During the trial, the three, defended by the lawyer Walter Riehl, pleaded self-defence. After nine days, on 14 July, the jury acquitted them.

=== General strike ===
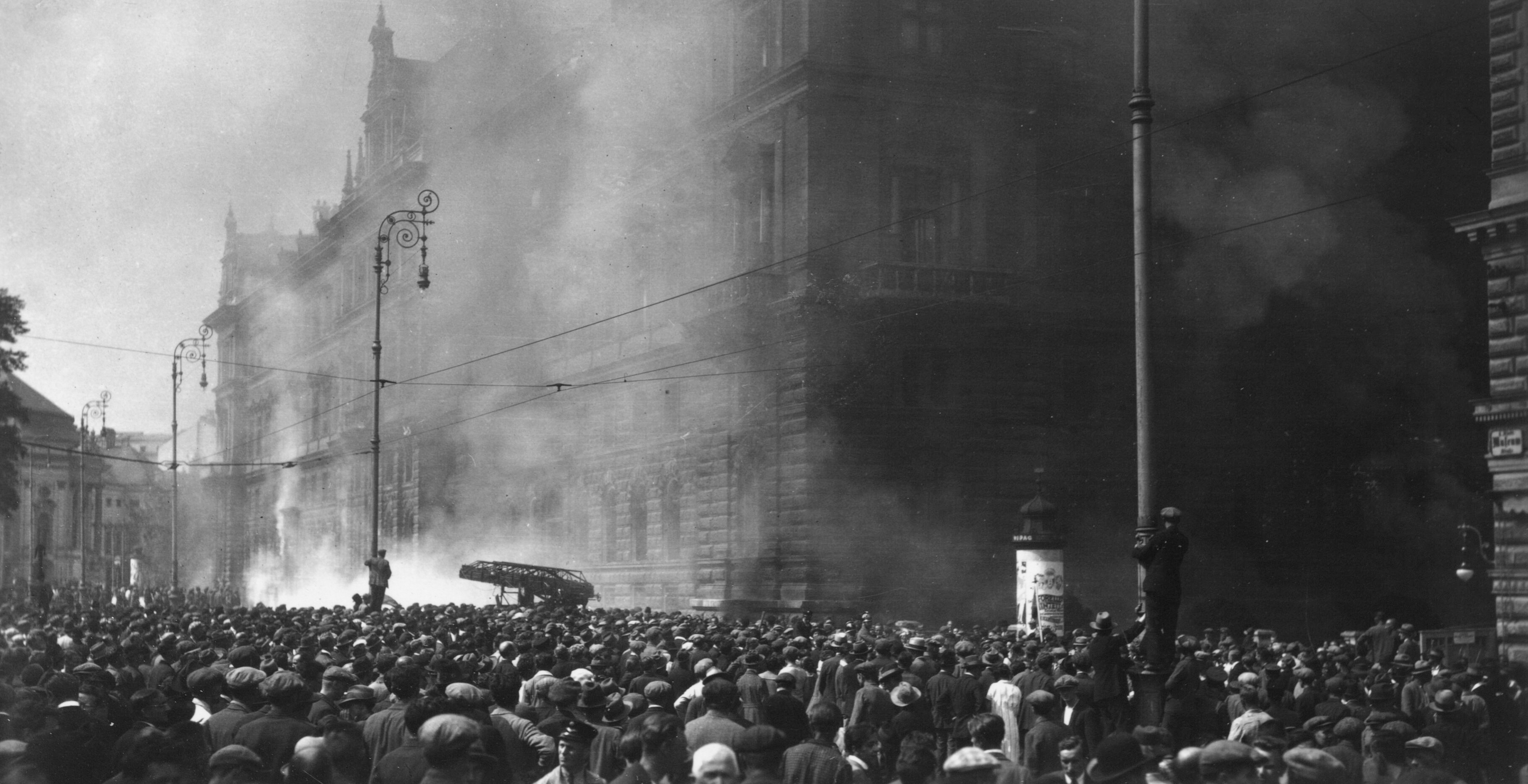
Protesters in front of the burning Palace of Justice

This "Schattendorf Verdict" led to a general strike, which had the aim of bringing down the government headed by Christian Social Party Chancellor Ignaz Seipel. Massive protests began on the morning of 15 July, when a furious crowd tried to storm the main building of the University of Vienna on the Ringstrasse. The protesters attacked and damaged a nearby police station and a newspaper building before they proceeded to the Austrian Parliament Building. Forced back by police, they arrived in the square in front of the Palace of Justice. Around noon, protesters entered the building by smashing the windows and then demolished the furnishings and began setting fire to files. Soon afterward, the building was ablaze. The fire spread quickly, as the Vienna fire brigade was attacked by several demonstrators, who cut the hoses and so prevented its being brought under control until the early morning.

The former (and later) Austrian Chancellor Johann Schober, who was then Vienna chief of police, suppressed the protests with force. He unsuccessfully urged Social Democratic Mayor Karl Seitz to call for the Austrian Armed Forces, which Seitz rejected. Schober attempted for the Christian Social Party Defence Minister Carl Vaugoin to do the same.

Finally, Schober supplied the police troops with army rifles and publicly announced that the premises would be cleared by force if the fire brigades could not work unhindered after Seitz and Schutzbund councillor Theodor Körner had attempted to persuade the crowd to surrender. The police opened fire and left 5 police officers and 89 demonstrators dead.

== Significance and remembrance ==
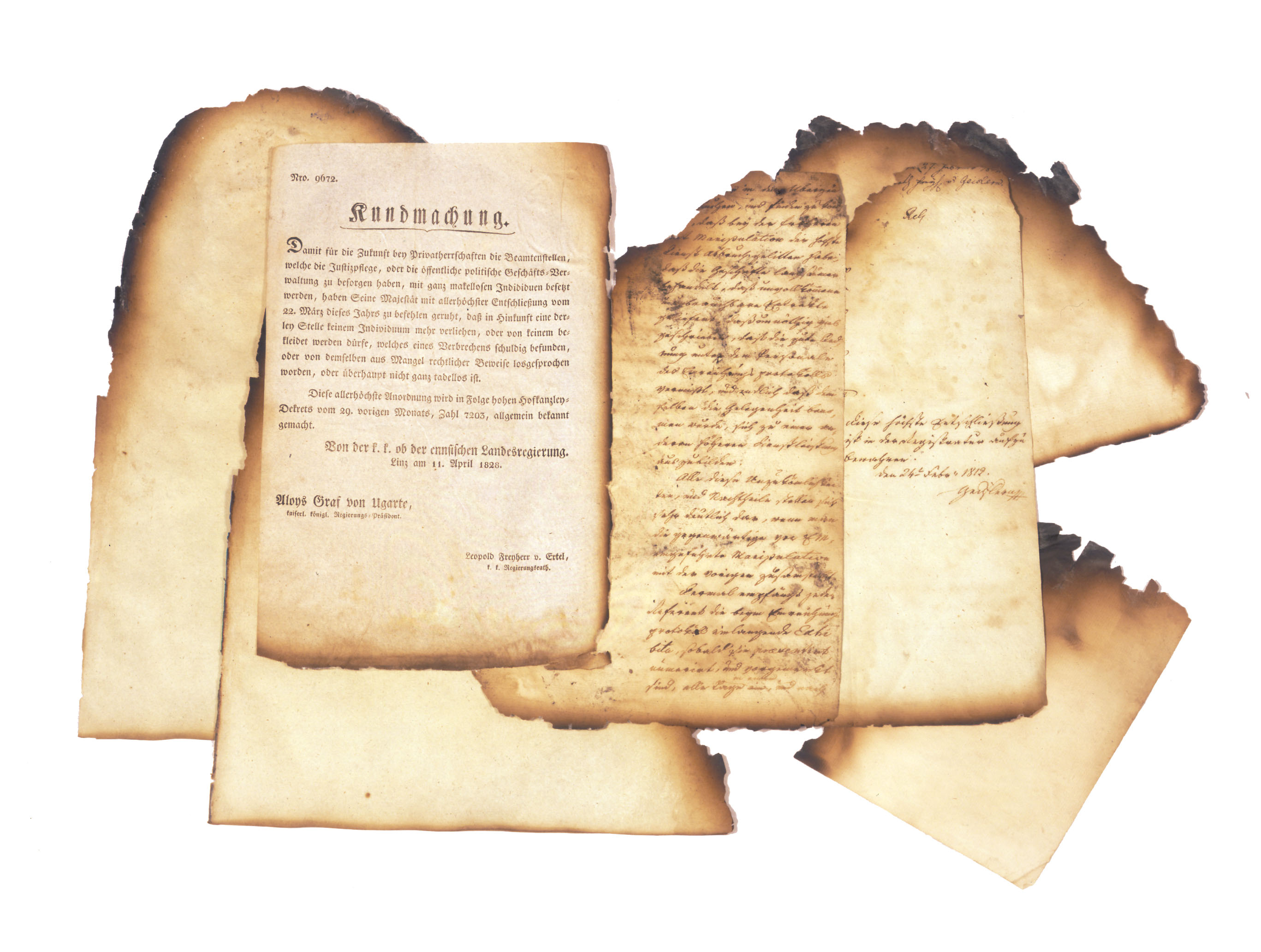
Scorched documents

The 20th-century philosopher, scholar and social commentator Karl Popper was 24 years old and living in Vienna during the unrest. In his 1976 autobiography, he recalled the event as foreshadowing extremism: “I began to expect the worst: that the democratic bastions of Central Europe would fall, and that a totalitarian Germany would start another war”.

Elias Canetti, in his autobiography The Torch in My Ear, credits his experience of the event with driving his subsequent life-long investigations of crowds, inspiring his Crowds and Power.

A memorial to the victims was erected in the Vienna Zentralfriedhof. A plaque at the Palace of Justice was unveiled by President Heinz Fischer in 2007. Several artifacts such as fire-damaged court papers and Schutzbund and Frontkämpfer uniforms are on display at the Heeresgeschichtliches Museum.

== See also ==
- Austrian Civil War
- July Putsch
