= Julius Deutsch =

Austrian politician (1884–1968)

Dr. Julius Deutsch
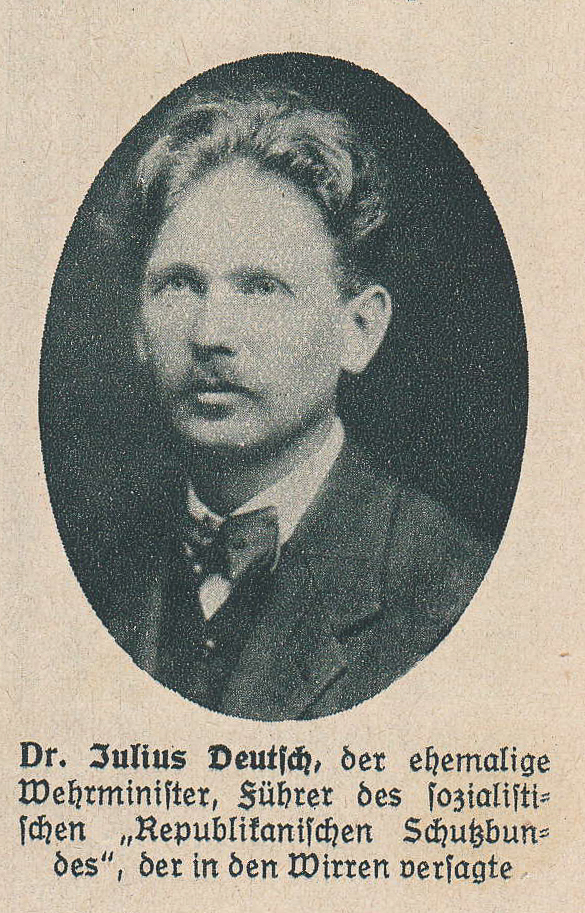
- Born: February 2, 1884; Lackenbach, Austria-Hungary
- Died: January 17, 1968 (aged 83); Vienna, Austria
- Resting place: Grinzing Cemetery
- Education: University of Vienna
- Occupation: Printer
- Employer: Arbeiter-Zeitung
- Organization: Republikanischer Schutzbund
- Known for: Promoting working-class culture through sports
- Notable work: Sport und Politik
- Political party: Social Democratic Workers' Party of Austria
- Movement: Socialism
- Board member of: Socialist Workers' Sport International
- Spouses: Josefine Schall; Maria Herzmansky; Adrienne Thomas

Julius Deutsch (February 2, 1884, Lackenbach, Austria-Hungary – January 17, 1968, Vienna, Austria) was a politician of the Social Democratic Workers' Party of Austria, member of Parliament between 1920 and 1933, and co-founder and leader of the Social Democrat militia Republikanischer Schutzbund ("Republican Defense Association").

== Leader of the Schutzbund ==
Julius Deutsch founded the Schutzbund in 1923 as an answer to the paramilitary organization Heimwehr ("Home Guard"), which was ideologically related to the Christian Social Party. He remained its leader until its destruction in 1934.

Schutzbund members were primarily recruited out of the Deutschösterreichische Volkswehr ("German-Austrian People's Guard"). It had been organized by Deutsch himself as Under Secretary of State in the Department of Armed Forces (November 1918 until March 1919) and as Secretary of State in the Department of Armed Forces (March 1919 until October 1920).

After the defeat of the Republican Guard during the Austrian Civil War of 1934 and the following ban on the Social Democrats, he fled to the city of Brno in Czechoslovakia.

== Emigration ==
From 1936 until 1939, Deutsch fought as a general of the Republican troops in the Spanish Civil War.

1939 he moved to Paris and worked for the foreign representation of the Austrian Socialists (AVOES). After the occupation of France by National Socialist Germany, Deutsch, who was of Jewish descent, had to emigrate again, this time to the United States of America. He returned to Austria in 1946. Deutsch was also the President of the Socialist Workers' Sport International.

Deutsch was married three times: to Josefine Schall, the mother of Grethe/Gretl Deutsch, to Maria Herzmansky, mother of Hedwig (Hexi) Kramer, and to the novelist Adrienne Thomas.

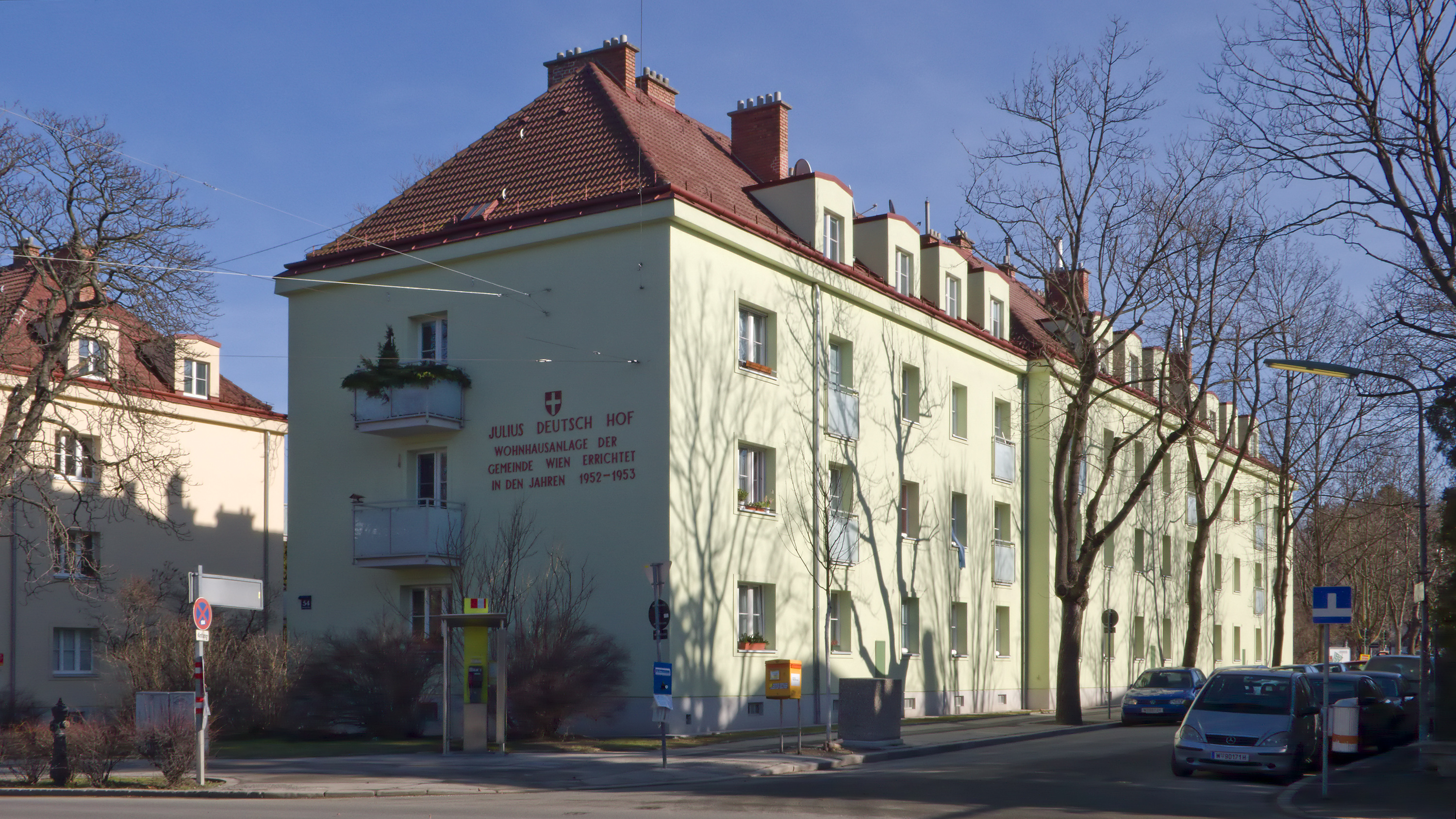
Julius-Deutsch-Hof in Döbling

After his death, a Vienna apartment complex Julius-Deutsch-Hof was named in his honor.

Julius Deutsch was also an uncle of Karl Wolfgang Deutsch, a renowned German-American social and political scientist; the grandfather of Canadian economist Gerald Karl Helleiner; and great-grandfather of Canadian political scientist Eric Helleiner.

== Works ==
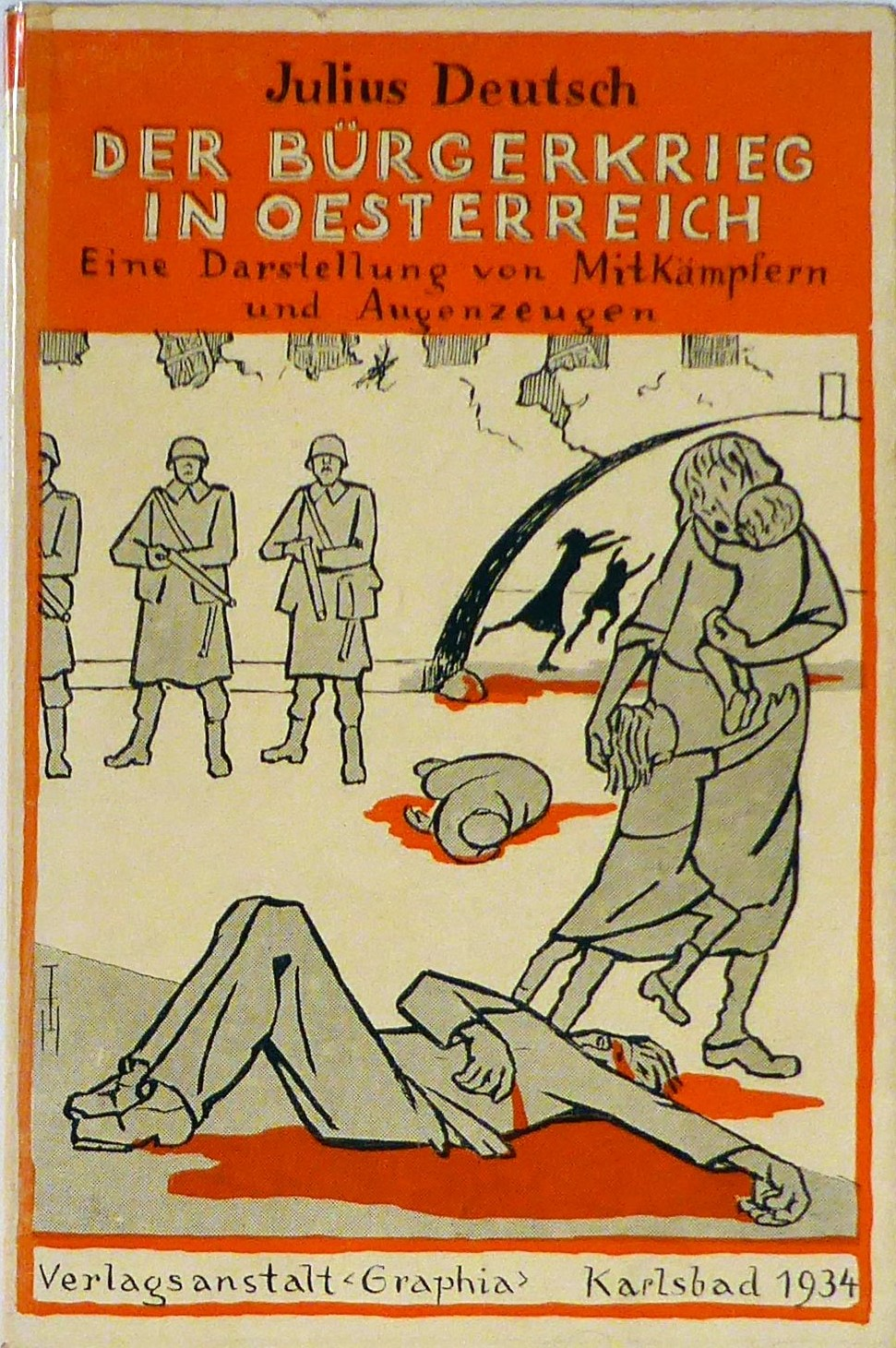
Cover of Der Bürgerkrieg in Österreich by Deutsch, 1934

- Antifascism, Sports, Sobriety: Forging a Militant Working-Class Culture. Selected Writings. Edited and translated by Gabriel Kuhn. Oakland: PM Press, 2017.
- Antifascism. Proletarian ability to put up a fight in the battle against Fascism. Vienna, 1926.
- In Aufbau (Reconstruction), New York City: New World Club:
  - "Protest gegen das 'National Austrian Committee'" ("Protest Against the 'National Austrian Committee'"), 3 April 1942, p. 5.
  - "Das neue Oesterreich" ("The New Austria"), 5 November 1943, p. 1.
  - "Die neue Regierung in Oesterreich" ("The New Government in Austria"), 4 May 1945, p. 3.
- In Vorwärts (Forwards):
  - "Reiseeindruecke in Amerika" ("Travelling Impressions in America"), 20 January 1935, supplement, p. 1.
- In Pariser Tageszeitung (Parisian Daily News):
  - "Von der Defensive in die Offensive" ("From Defense to Offense"), 24 July 1937, p. 1.
  - "Spaniens Freiheitskampf: die Ehre der Demokratie" ("Spain's Battle for Freedom: the Honor of Democracy"), 2 January 1938, p. 2.
- In Sozialistische Warte (Socialist Observatory):
  - "Eine eindeutige Antwort" ("A Clear Answer"), 18 August 1939, p. 793.
