= Hotel Schiff =

Hotel in Linz, Austria

Coordinates: 48°18′06″N 14°17′24″E

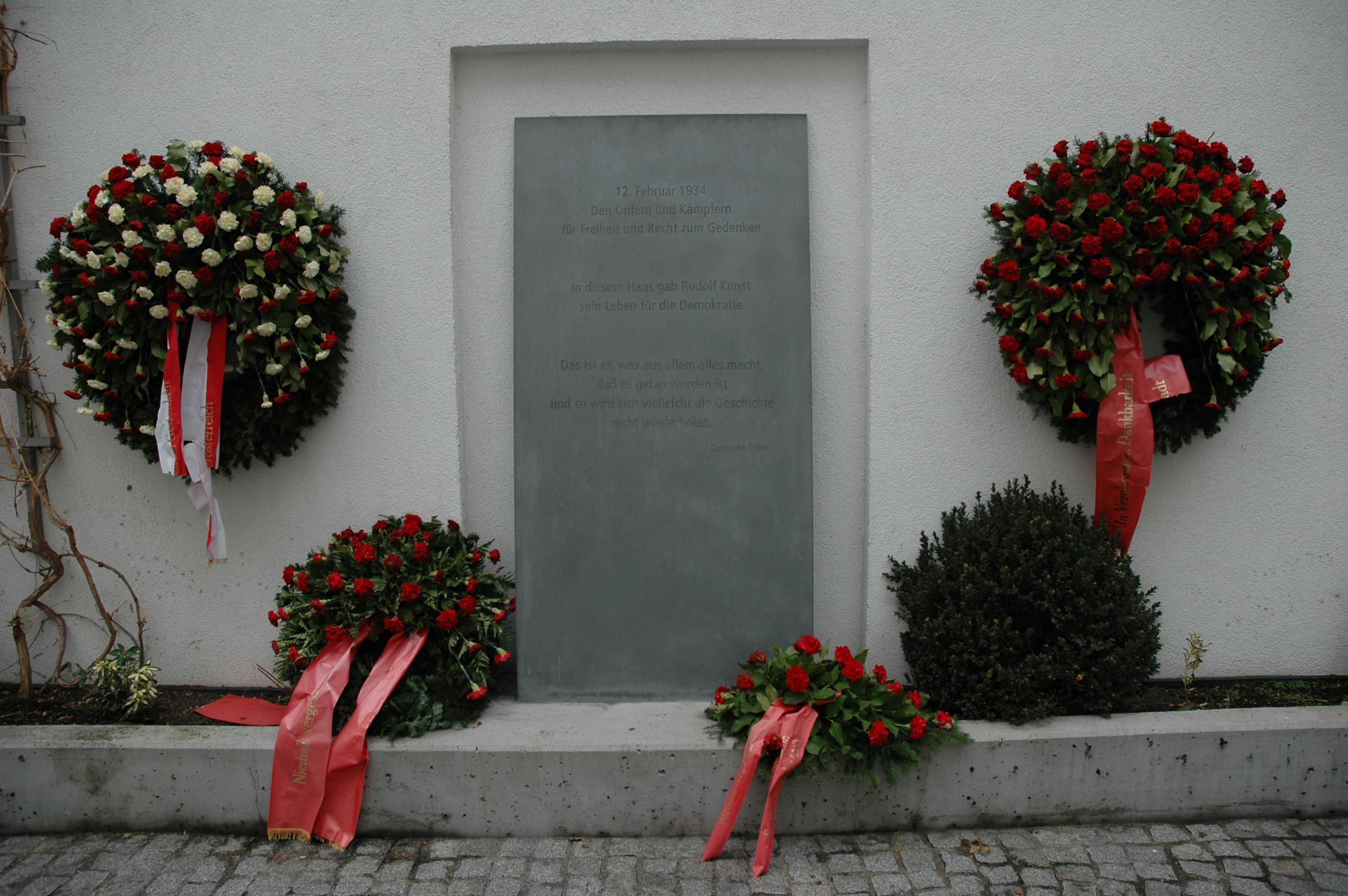
Memorial to the victims and fighters at the place where the civil war started, in the courtyard of the Hotel Schiff in Linz.

The Hotel Schiff is a hotel in Linz. In 1934 it was the starting point of the Austrian Civil War.

The Gasthof Zum Goldenen Schiff was built in 1788 on a site which had been used since 1563 by the Brethren of the Poor.

== Cinema ==
The Hotel zum Goldenen Schiff, was established in the 19th century. It was here in 1895 that the first public demonstration of the gramophone was given and in September 1896 the first cinematic performance occurred following Roithner's variety show. From March to April 1897 the first regular film screenings in Linz were held here. In 1909 John Wind bought the hotel and developed cinema here.

== Social Democrats ==
In 1920, the hotel, restaurant and cinema became the property of the Upper Austrian Social Democratic Workers' Party of Austria (SDAPÖ). The existing facilities were now augmented with the offices of the Linz SDP party secretariat, a library and reading room. Until the suppression of the SDP by the government, the Hotel Schiff was an important meeting place and of the SDAPÖ and their paramilitary arm, the Schutzbund. In 1922 cinema, the Central Theater, opened.

On 12 February 1934 the police legally raided the Hotel Schiff, looking for weapons. Those inside violently attacked the police: the Austrian Civil War had begun. The armed conflict soon spread to nearby areas of Linz, and within a few hours later there were violent confrontations between Schutzbund on the one hand and the right-wing Heimwehr, police and army on the other. The Hotel Schiff was finally seized later that same day and occupied by army units.

In 1948, three years after the Second World War, the building was returned to the Social Democratic Party. The building still houses the offices of Social Democratic Party, and until 2006, the Central Cinema.
