= Republikanischer Schutzbund =

Austrian paramilitary organization (1923–1936)

Republican Protection League
- Republikanischer Schutzbund; SchB
- Emblem of the Schutzbund
- Founder: Social Democratic Party of Austria
- Founded: 1923
- Dissolved: 1934
- Headquarters: Vienna
- Active regions: Austria
- Ideology: Social democracy; Socialism; Republicanism; Anti-fascism; Anti-monarchism; Anti-clericalism Factions: Communism
- Political position: Left-wing; Factions: Far-left
- Status: Defunct
- Size: 100,000 (peak in 1925)
- Wars: Austrian Civil War

The Republikanischer Schutzbund (German: [ʁepubliˈkaːnɪʃɐ ˈʃʊtsˌbʊnt], SchB; transl. Republican Protection League) was an Austrian paramilitary organisation established in 1923 by the Social Democratic Workers' Party of Austria to defend the Austrian Republic in the face of rising political radicalisation after World War I. The Schutzbund, whose membership peaked at about 100,000 men in 1925, was armed and organised on military lines. In the July Revolt of 1927 it worked with government authorities to try to prevent the spread of violence, but it largely sat out the Pfrimer Putsch in September 1931 because it had failed so quickly.

Under the right-wing authoritarian government of Engelbert Dollfuss, the Schutzbund was banned on 31 March 1933, and the Austrian police began arresting its members and searching for weapons. When they attempted to enter the Social Democrats' headquarters in Linz on 12 February 1934 to look for arms, local Schutzbund members opened fire and sparked the Austrian Civil War. The Schutzbund was quickly defeated by the superior numbers and weaponry of the police and Austrian Army. Many Schutzbund members were arrested and nine men were executed, a number of whom were prominent in the Schutzbund. The Social Democratic Party was banned, and with it the Republikanischer Schutzbund came to an end.

== History ==
=== 1918–1927 ===
==== Precursor organisations ====
Due to the political and administrative disorder in immediate post-war Austria, public safety could not be guaranteed by the state alone. In order to defend armament and other large factories against potential marauders and also to protect the general population, improvised civil police forces were formed throughout Austria. The most significant of the forces were established by the socialists in November 1918 to safeguard the founding of the First Austrian Republic.

In response to the large-scale creation of right-wing militias, the workers’ militias (Arbeiterwehren) were maintained after the re-establishment of basic public order. They formed the organisational core of the later Schutzbund.

In 1920, the Social Democratic Party of Austria (SDAPÖ) officially sanctioned the merger and extension of the various workers’ militias into a single unified, but for the time being unarmed, militia. The decision was a response to the dangers posed by the new Horthy government in Hungary and the right-wing "gangs crossing the border from Bavaria". In the clashes with Hungarian militiamen over the status of Burgenland, the consolidated workers’ militia received arms from the Austrian state.

==== Development ====
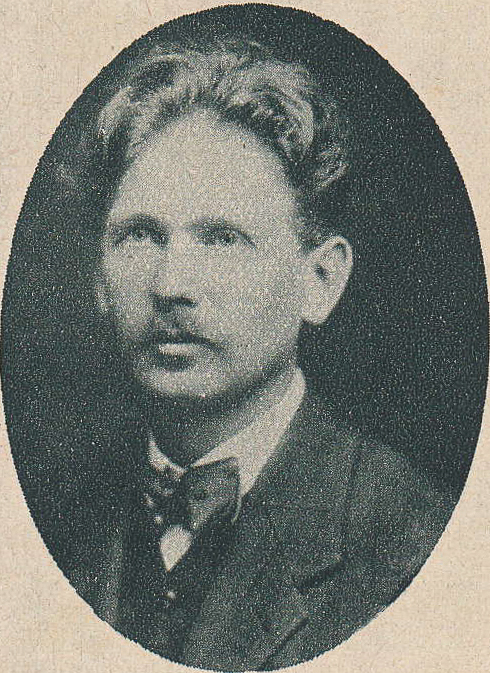
Julius Deutsch, one of the founders of the Republikanischer Schutzbund

In 1921, Julius Deutsch of the SDAPÖ – who had previously been Austrian minister for the army – pushed for the development of Austria's only fundamentally unified workers’ militia into a consolidated and properly organised party militia. After intra-party talks, Deutsch in 1922 proposed the creation of a Republikanischer Schutzbund, which was officially registered with the federal government as an association in 1923.

During the four years of development of socialist militia activities, armaments and degree of military organisation were the most controversial questions discussed by the socialists. Most in favour of regular arms for the Schutzbund were the Communists. Despite its relative unpopularity, the Communist Party of Austria still had influence in various workers’ organisations, among others those tasked with the development of the Schutzbund. Julius Deutsch likewise favoured consistent armament, although he attempted to delay it in 1923 due to potential complications with the Entente powers over re-armament questions. Despite confiscations of weaponry by the Entente and some arms sales for funds, the consolidated workers’ militia in 1921 possessed roughly 26,000 rifles, 225 machine guns, 2.5 million rounds of ammunition and several artillery pieces.

The years from 1923 to 1927 saw various clashes between the main political actors of the time and their paramilitaries – socialists with the Schutzbund and the conservative Christian Social Party with the Heimwehren (Home Guards) or other paramilitary organisations. The Austrian National Socialists also grew in importance, clashing with both socialists and Christian conservatives.

=== July Revolt of 1927 ===
==== Immediate background ====
The small town of Schattendorf in the recently annexed, previously Hungarian state of Burgenland had been the site of several violent clashes between socialists and conservatives. Particularly after 1926, Hungarian irredentists and land-owning farmers, representing a significant share of local conservatives, clashed on a regular basis with the majority of the population sympathising with the socialists, who were mostly factory workers and peasants. In January 1927, Schutzbund members from Schattendorf confronted members of the right-wing and Heimwehr-associated Front-line Fighters' Association (Frontkämpfervereinigung), which led to a minor skirmish. After it had died down and both parties were leaving, members of the Frontkämpfervereinigung shot from ambush at the Schutzbund members, wounding five and killing two – a six-year-old boy and an adult war veteran.

The murders of Schattendorf, as they were known, led to protests across all of Austria, particularly in Vienna, where they climaxed in a brief strike.

==== The Revolt ====
Three men were charged with murder in Schattendorf and tried before a jury. The three, locals of Schattendorf, considered their actions to be self-defence against alleged gunshots coming from the Schutzbund members. The jury acquitted the three on all counts.

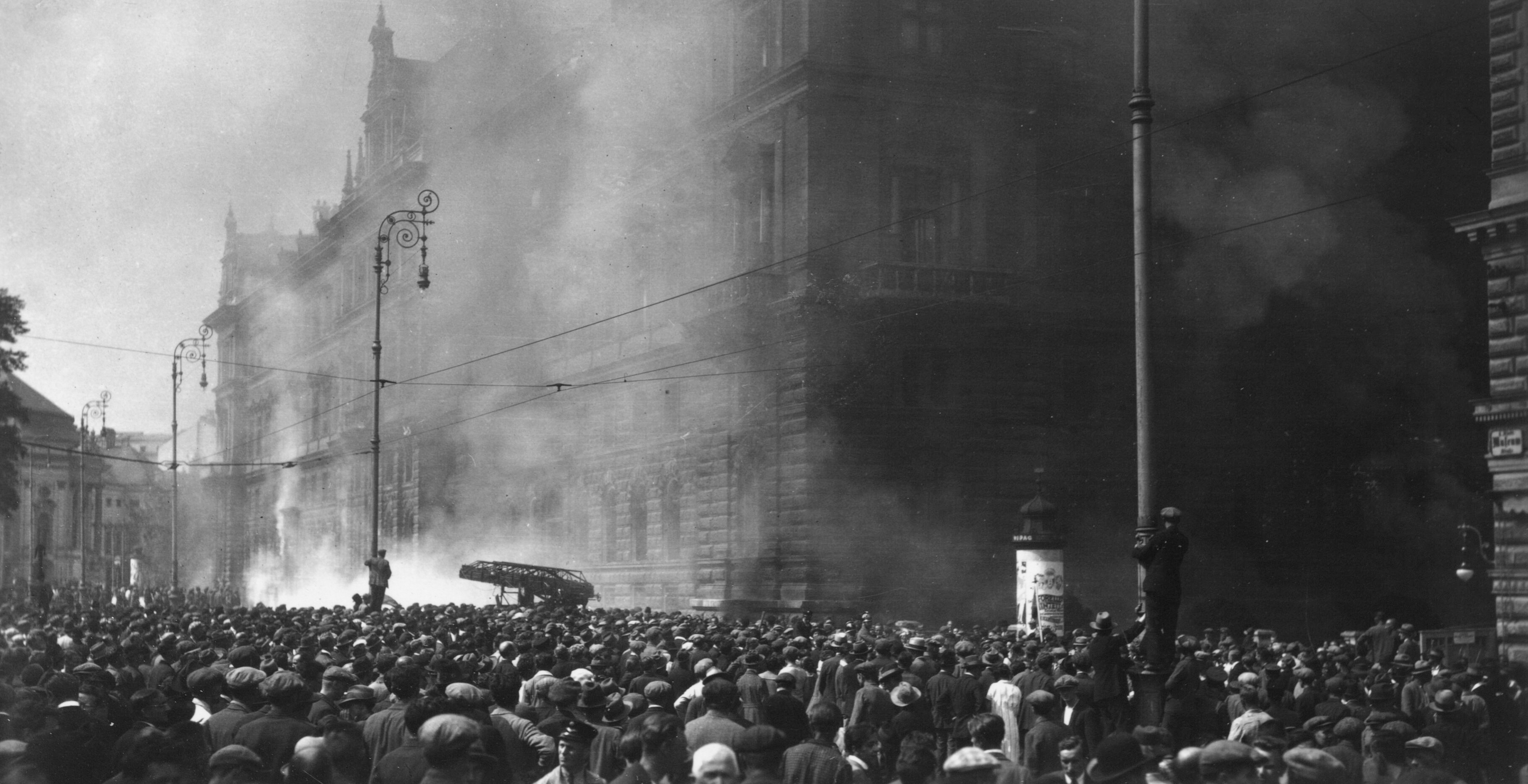
Protesters in front of the burning Palace of Justice during the July Revolt of 1927

The socialists had originally introduced and popularised the concept of jury trials as part of their political programme and considered it propagandistically unwise to organise a formal protest against the verdict. As a result, while news of the acquittal led to immediate protests across Vienna in the early hours of 15 July 1927, they were spontaneous and unplanned. The protests were later unwittingly directed by police riot control action to the Palace of Justice, where the protests reached their height. Given its lack of interest in organising a protest, party leadership had not activated the Schutzbund in advance. It was called to action when it was clear that large masses of workers had filled the streets to take part in the protest and when the Viennese police asked them for help. At that point, the majority of Schutzbund members received an order to mobilise, although some refused the order and remained part of the protesting masses. By 1 PM, roughly 2,400 Schutzbund men had arrived at the scene, armed and in uniform, where they faced tens of thousands of protesters.

The Schutzbund, together with Vienna's mayor Karl Seitz and Theodor Körner, chair of the Federal Council, attempted to pacify the masses in order to prevent further violence. After the Palace of Justice was set ablaze, Schutzbund members successfully opened a corridor among the protesters to make way for firefighters and saved a few dozen guards from the flames.

Eventually, Viennese police chief Johannes Schober ordered the police to open fire on the protesters. 84 were killed and more than one thousand wounded, including 11 dead and 34 wounded among the Schutzbund.

=== 1927–1934 ===
Immediately following the July Revolt and further militarisation of right-wing militias, SDAPÖ leadership recognised the need for Schutzbund reforms in order to guarantee its military capabilities. Party leadership instituted a reform committee – among its members were Julius Deutsch, Otto Bauer and Theodor Körner – to work out a concrete reform programme. The lack of discipline among the Schutzbund men was a particular problem, and Körner forced strict military discipline for the post-reform Schutzbund. As Deutsch said, the Schutzbund was finally to become the "guard of the party and the trade unions". Körner from then on opened Schutzbund meetings not in a comradely way, but by ordering "Attention!"

New Schutzbund recruits had to sign a declaration of commitment and swear an oath, candidates were screened more thoroughly, and they were required to have been members of the party for at least two years. “Technical” (military) and administrative organisation were strictly divided, as was common in militaries. The Schutzbund also received a more stringent hierarchy consisting of groups, platoons, companies and battalions in ascending order by members. Körner was appointed one of the lead strategists of the Technical Committee and Rudolf Löw as his secretary. Alexander Eifler was appointed commander of all Schutzbund formations in Vienna.

==== Pfrimer putsch ====
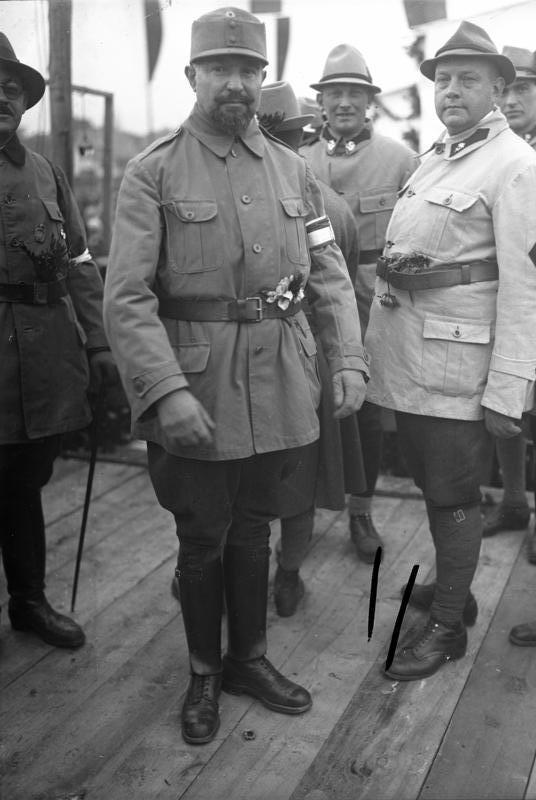
Walter Pfrimer (right) with Heimwehr leader Richard Steidle, about 1930

In the years following the July Revolt, there was a lessening of the constant threat of violence under which Austrian politics had existed. The Heimwehr went through a period of stagnation, even organisational degeneration. Despite their unity on some central ideals, the movement had always been relatively heterogeneous and riddled with strife. Following various unsuccessful attempts at furthering their influence on Austrian politics as well as the temporary resignation of long-time, more moderate Heimwehr leader Ernst Rüdiger Starhemberg, Walter Pfrimer, a radical Tyrolean Heimwehr leader, felt that a coup akin to Mussolini's March on Rome was necessary to realise the political aims of the Heimwehr. The result was the Pfrimer putsch in 1931. The coup attempt started in the evening of 12 September 1931, when some 14,000 Heimwehr men spread out across most of Styria, arresting mayors and public officials. In order to replicate the March on Rome, Pfrimer and 600 more Heimwehr men made their way to Amstetten, after which they planned to march to Vienna. They were easily stopped by the Austrian Armed Forces in Amstetten and arrested.

SDAPÖ and Schutzbund leadership were informed of the coup attempt shortly after the Army and police, which allowed the Schutzbund to mobilise its forces in Styria as quickly as possible. Party leadership, however, ordered the Schutzbund not to use force against the putschists, as they were already reported to be retreating.

The coup attempt was easily repelled, most putschists were able to return to their homes and received only mild punishments for their participation. Pfrimer fled Austria for a few months.

=== The Austrian Civil War of 1934 ===
==== Background ====
The climax of the Schutzbund as a party paramilitary was the Austrian Civil War that lasted from 12 to 15 February 1934. It was the prime type of situation for which the Schutzbund had originally been organised.

The Austrian political situation had become more divided in the two years preceding the Civil War. The Pfrimer putsch proved socialist fears that the Heimwehr movement was not just theoretically but also practically willing to stage a coup. Likewise, the mild response by Federal Army and police forces had shown a clear lack of willingness from the conservative Austrian government to oppose such actions decisively. Emil Fey, the radical Viennese Heimwehr leader, stated in an interview in February 1932 that a new coup was in the works, this time originating from Vienna, which would force the current government either to accept their conditions for political change or to resign. Heimwehr leaders were called into government by Chancellor Engelbert Dollfuss in May 1932. Emil Fey assumed the post of Minister for Public Security in early 1933, which gave him control of the Austrian police and gendarmerie. At the same time, the Heimwehr was declared an “assistant force” to the Austrian police and army.

The change in the political situation resulted in the need for a fundamental strategic reorientation in the Schutzbund, which until then had aimed in general to aid the Austrian police and army in case of a coup. Starting in 1932, the government intensified its searches for weapons at known socialist sites, and the success of the operation greatly reduced the weaponry available to the Schutzbund. The weapons searches led to a propaganda campaign by the socialists in which they made an intense effort to recruit new Schutzbund members and gather more weapons. Deutsch and Körner attempted to negotiate a disarmament agreement with the government, but to no avail. The Heimwehr, as part of the government, was unwilling to give up their weapons.

Following Chancellor Dollfuss’ elimination of the Austrian Parliament in March 1933, the Schutzbund was put on high alert. Parts of the

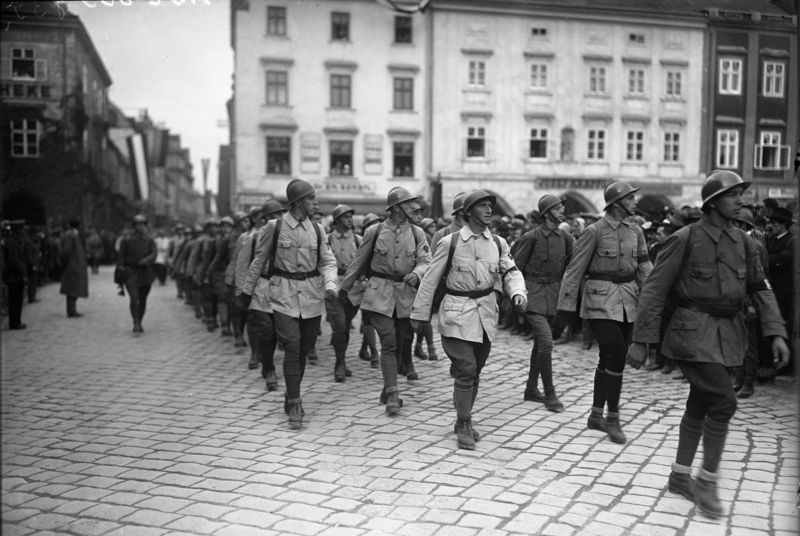
Republikanischer Schutzbund men on the march in 1930

Schutzbund, particularly the Upper Austrian division led by Richard Bernaschek headquartered in Linz, were pressing to finally decide on the use violence and warned of mutinies. Party leadership, however, was still unwilling to give the order and instead continued to focus on negotiations despite the physical and psychological readiness of the Schutzbund to enter combat.

This showed Fey as Minister of Public Security the weakness of the socialists and motivated him to push further for the official dissolution of the Schutzbund. Decrees to disband specific units were issued, some of which were met with little resistance or surprise, particularly in Tyrol, Carinthia and Burgenland, and some with immediate protests, particularly in Vienna and Lower Austria. Weapons searches and confiscations went on as well.

After it was officially banned on 31 May 1933, the Schutzbund remained active illegally. Members met without uniform in different locations, usually only as small groups rather than in large formations, and discussed further actions.

Most of the former Schutzbund membership was transformed into the so-called "Propaganda Division", with the new leadership of the "Propaganda Division" the same as the former Schutzbund leadership. The signs of a coming fascist revolution marked the months before the Civil War in early 1934. Otto Bauer of the SDAPÖ had laid out in late 1933 the four cases in which the Schutzbund would take up arms: any infraction of the rights of the City of Vienna or the recalling of its mayor; the forced dissolution of the trade unions; the forced dissolution of the party; or the introduction of a fascist constitution or the abolition of free elections.

Following intra-party discussions on strategy, an action committee in Vienna consisting of party leadership and others, among them Alexander Eifler, decided to reintroduce military organisation to the Schutzbund. It drafted and decreed preliminary principles for clandestine military operations. A resolution on tactics stated: "The party must intensify its struggle against the bourgeois dictatorship and use any potential for offensive action." The new clandestine military activities were to take place within the confines of the socialist sports association ASKÖ. Despite its losses in membership, the illegal Schutzbund had retained roughly 40,000 to 50,000 members.

In January 1934, the socialists again decided to try to start negotiations; Deutsch forwarded letters to Dollfuss, who was thoroughly uninterested. He considered the socialists to have become entirely irrelevant. Bauer concluded in early January that "now, a resolution of this matter cannot be reached in any other way than a violent one".

Eifler tried to finish the Schutzbund's final preparations for war, advising its leaders to go into hiding but stay in contact for orders. Most Schutzbund leaders ignored the advice, and they were rounded up and arrested in the following weeks, including Eifler himself, who was arrested on 2 February. Julius Deutsch was advised to flee the country and went to Czechoslovakia.

Many documents of Schutzbund strategy – among them Eifler's general strategy – were found by government forces. This allowed police and military to develop specific reaction plans.

==== Civil War ====
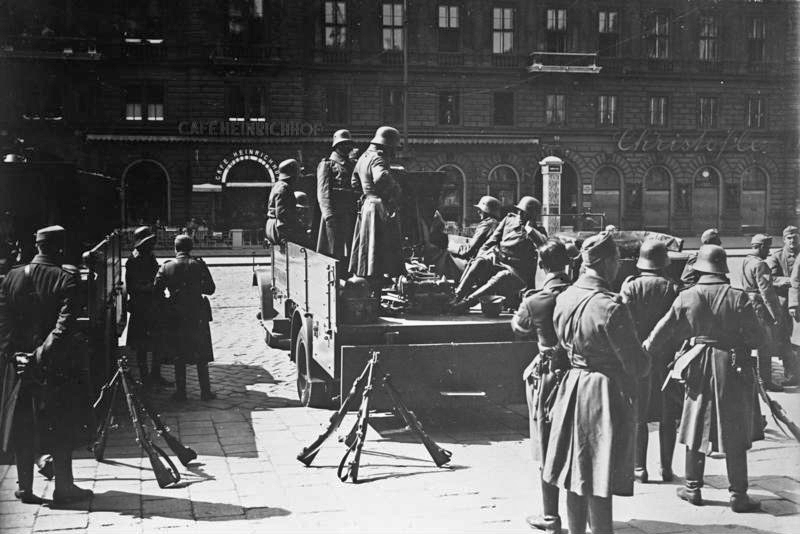
Soldiers of the Austrian Federal Army in Vienna at the beginning of the Austrian Civil War, 12 February 1934

On 12 February 1934, the police were ordered to search for weapons in the Hotel Schiff in Linz, the base of Richard Bernaschek's Schutzbund division. Since Bernaschek had declared many times that he had had enough and that the next provocation by government forces would mean defensive action by his troops, the weapons search triggered the Schutzbund in the Hotel Schiff to fight back. A coded telegram to Bernaschek from the SDAPÖ's leaders that warned him urgently against any action and instructed him to await the decision of party leadership had been intercepted by the authorities and never reached him. Bernaschek sent orders to other Schutzbund formations in Upper Austria and triggered skirmishes there. Once Schutzbund formations in the other Austrian states heard that Bernaschek and his men were fighting back, many voluntarily decided to do the same and tried to take over police stations in their respective areas. In Vienna, some of the party and the remaining Schutzbund leadership – Deutsch, Schorsch, Pollak, Körner, Helmer and some Schutzbund commanders – met and decided to declare a general strike.

In the following hours, SDAPÖ leadership met to shape the orders to be given out to all Schutzbund formations, none of which was taken seriously at that point, as most Schutzbund formations, disappointed by the lack of input from Vienna, took matters into their own hands. Particularly those in Vienna, Lower Austria, Upper Austria and Styria took up arms on their own initiative, while the formations in the other states resigned themselves to waiting for more orders or were left leaderless.

All Schutzbund formations were overpowered within the next four days, marking the end of the Civil War. According to a comprehensive 2018 study by historian Kurt Bauer, between 350 and 370 people lost their lives in the fighting – about 130 of them uninvolved civilians and 110 each among the government forces and members of the Schutzbund.

The party leadership's inability to decide quickly enough to issue an order to fight was later considered by Otto Bauer the "gravest of our mistakes".

== Theory, strategy and organisation ==
=== Principles ===
The Schutzbund was formed at the behest of the SDAPÖ's large left-wing faction, represented by members including Otto Bauer, Julius Deutsch and Max Adler. Unlike in Germany, the Austrian socialists had kept their party largely united until 1934, with the Communist Party of Austria (KPÖ) never gaining any significant traction as compared to the KPD or the USPD in Germany. The KPÖ resembled much more an ultra-left splinter group, which allowed the left wing of the SDAPÖ to utilise the KPÖ's much more extensive party resources and membership base, giving the Schutzbund a considerably more pronounced left-wing background than its sister organisation, the German Reichsbanner. Unlike the Reichsbanner, the Schutzbund had a more tolerant relationship with communists in its own ranks, as well as with the Austrian Communist Party, particularly in the early 1920s and from 1930 onwards.

Its ultimate aim remained the defence of parliamentary democracy and the Austrian Republic against fascism, rather than the violent introduction of socialist policies or a dictatorship of the proletariat modelled after Soviet Russia. Factions within the Schutzbund and its leadership were, however, open to the possibility of utilising violence to overcome a fascist coup not only while it was in progress but also after it had happened, ultimately aiming either to safeguard or restore parliamentary democracy.

The Schutzbund was organised along military lines, particularly after 1927. Alexander Eifler, as the Schutzbund's chief of staff, favoured a streamlined, classic military organisation with a rigid rank structure and strict discipline. At its peak in 1925, it counted some 100,000 members and had access to a considerable number of small arms and explosives as well as some artillery. By 1928, after its reorganisation, it counted roughly 80,000 men, with more than 60,000 of them in Vienna, Lower Austria and Styria.

=== The "Technical Committee" ===
The Schutzbund's "Technical Committee" (Technischer Ausschuss) was its military-strategic centre. Its members devised the fundamental strategic structure of the Schutzbund and worked out all necessary orders for its subordinate formations, in essence representing its general staff. The Technical Committee was dominated by Alexander Eifler and Theodor Körner, both former Imperial Austrian Army officers, with diametrically opposed views on strategy. While Eifler favoured a streamlined, classic military organisation to fight in conventional battles, Körner considered the role of the Schutzbund to be that of the spearhead of a large workers' movement during a necessary general strike, utilising guerilla rather than conventional combat tactics.

=== Uniforms and insignia ===
The three arrows symbol on the Schutzbund armband. It was also used by the German Social Democratic Party.

Particularly in the beginning, the workers' militia and the later Schutzbund were not able to provide standard uniforms, instead relying on red armbands. Later, the armbands displayed three arrows in a circle, the symbol of the SDAPÖ after 1932. After 1927, the Schutzbund received more regular uniforms, with most members wearing a brown-green high-collar jacket and dark pants, usually with a Sam Browne belt. The red armband was worn on the left upper arm. Some formations also wore patches that showed their organisational affiliation with roman numerals corresponding to their Schutzbund district in the upper half, together with the traditional socialist "hands of brothers" (Bruderhände, a depiction of a handshake) in its lower half. The best known uniform symbol of the Schutzbund was its cap with Schutzbund and SDAPÖ insignia.

The Schutzbund rank system referred to immediate positions of command, with the commander of each formation holding a certain rank. Because the Schutzbund was organised in groups, platoons, companies, battalions and sometimes regiments, Schutzbund members could hold up to five ranked positions. The positions of command were denoted by white stripes below or on the red armband or the Schutzbund patch, one for group leaders, two for platoon leaders, three for company leaders, four for battalion leaders. For district leaders, it depicted a "BL" for "district leadership" (Bezirksleitung). The ranks were tied to a position of command and would be lost when leaving the position.

Top Schutzbund leaders, members of the central leadership (Zentralleitung) wore armbands that bore the abbreviation of their group: "ZL".

=== Organisation ===
The Schutzbund was an association formally independent of the SDAPÖ, made up of various sections (formally independent component associations) delineated by districts. Its statutes were tied to agreements with the SDAPÖ, as were decisions to mobilise and the like. Two spheres of organisation were recognised, the administrative and the "technical" (military). Administrative organisation dealt with acquiring weaponry and other equipment, general finances and the like, whereas the "technical" organisation dealt with staff work, tactics and training. The supreme organ was the "Federal Leadership" (Bundesleitung), consisting of the "Central Leadership" (including the "Technical Committee"), its auditing office and other organs of central organisation. The Federal Leadership was elected at party conventions of the SDAPÖ or appointed by SDAPÖ leadership. General strategy was worked out in the Technical Committee, with the Central Leadership acting as the Schutzbund's general staff. Militarily, the Schutzbund was subject to orders of the Central Leadership, which were responded to by a chain of command in descending order by the provincial and district leaders, then regimental or battalion, company, platoon and group leaders.

Until 1927, the Schutzbund was organised as follows:

1923–1924
District commands Bezirkskommanden
District	No.
Vienna	1
Vienna	2
Vienna	3
Vienna	4
Vienna	5
Vienna	6
Wiener Neustadt	7
Bruck an der Leitha	8
St. Pölten	9
Korneuburg	10
Amstetten	11
Krems an der Donau	12
Kapfenberg	13
Graz	14
Linz	15
Steyr	16
Wels	17
Salzburg	18
Innsbruck	19
Klagenfurt	20

1924–1927
Districts Kreise		Battalions
District	No.	Battalions
Vienna (I, VI, VII, VIII, IX)	1	201–211
Vienna (III, IV, V)	2	193–200
Vienna (X, XI)	3	179–192
Vienna (XII, XIII, XIV, XV)	4	212–223
Vienna (XVI, XVII)	5	224–235
Vienna (XVIII, XIX, XX)	6	236–245
Vienna (II, XXI)	7	172–179; 246-252
Viertel unter dem Wienerwald	8	69–100
Viertel ober dem Wienerwald	9	101–124
Viertel ober dem Manhartsberg	10	125–145
Viertel unter dem Manhartsberg	11	146–171
Upper Austria	12	27–59
Salzburg, Tirol, Vorarlberg	13	1-26
Carinthia	14	60–68
Styria	15	253–281
Burgenland	16	282–289

== See also ==
- List of defunct paramilitary organisations
- Reichsbanner Schwarz-Rot-Gold, paramilitary organisation of the German SPD
- Arbeiter-Schutzbund
- Socialist Action (Poland)

== Bibliography ==
- McLoughlin, Finbarr (1990). Der Republikanische Schutzbund und gewalttätige politische Auseinandersetzungen in Österreich 1923–1934 (PDF) ([The Republican Protection League and Violent Political Conflicts in Austria 1923–1934] PhD thesis). University of Vienna.
