= Waldemar Pabst =

German soldier and political activist (1880–1970)

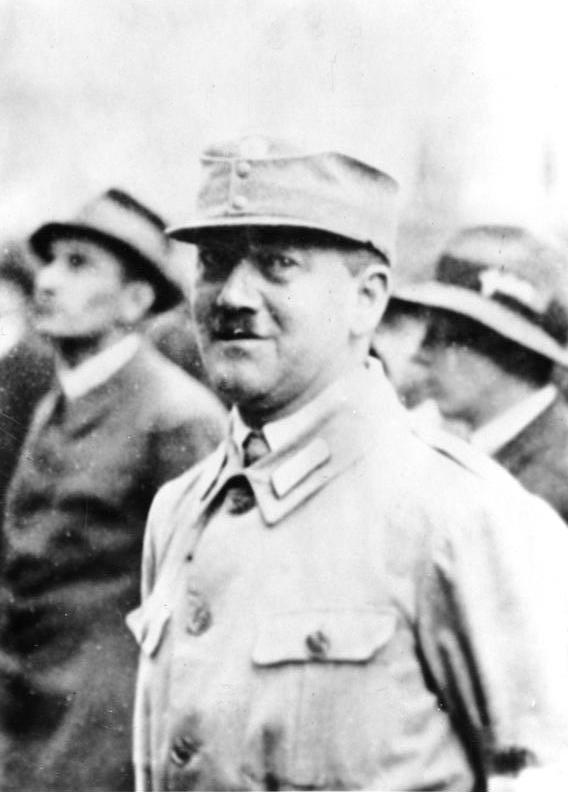
- Pabst c. 1928
- Born: 24 December 1880; Berlin, German Empire
- Died: 29 May 1970 (aged 89); Düsseldorf, West Germany
- Other name: Waldemar der Grosse ("Waldemar the Great")
- Occupations: Army officer, weapons manufacturer
- Known for: Freikorps leader
- Title: Hauptmann (self-declared Major)

Waldemar Pabst (24 December 1880 – 29 May 1970) was a German soldier and political activist who was involved in extreme nationalist and anti-communist paramilitary activity in both the Weimar Republic and in Austria. As a Freikorps officer, Captain Pabst gained notoriety for ordering the summary executions of Karl Liebknecht and Rosa Luxemburg in 1919 as well as for his leading role in the attempted coup d'etat by Wolfgang Kapp. In Austria, he played a central part in organising rightist militia groups before being deported for his activities. Pabst subsequently faded from public life in Nazi Germany, as he was never more than loosely associated with the Nazis.

== Life ==
=== Early life ===
Born in Berlin, Pabst was the son of a museum director. He attended the Preußische Hauptkadettenanstalt, the training academy for officers in the Prussian Army, as a contemporary of Franz von Papen at the institution and was commissioned as an officer in 1899.

Pabst saw active service in the World War I, mainly on the Western Front in Belgium and most notably at the Battle of Verdun. In 1916 he was withdrawn from the front and redeployed as a member of the German General Staff.

=== Anti-communism ===
Under the orders of General Erich Ludendorff, Pabst joined the new Guards Cavalry Rifle Division in March 1918, late in the war. As chief of general staff, Pabst converted the regiment from cavalry to infantry. The regiment would become noted as the fiercest counter-revolutionary force in Germany at the time.

Pabst first came to prominence during the Communist and left-wing uprisings that immediately followed the war. As commander of the rifle guard, Captain Pabst was instrumental in such actions as the recapture of the Vorwärts building on 11–12 January 1919. His actions saw him promoted to the role of Chief of Staff, and as such, effectively commander, of the Horse Guards Division, an important Freikorps unit. Pabst permitted the summary execution of all individuals caught with a firearm, which resulted in the killing of many civilians and war veterans who were uninvolved in the strike. Among those killed was Communist Party leader Leo Jogiches, the former personal partner of murdered revolutionary Rosa Luxemburg. Pabst's energetic commitment to the unit, his strong anti-communist feelings, his general distrust of the commanding officers of the army and the fact that de jure commander General von Hoffmann had grown exhausted because of a heart condition meant that Pabst became the focus of the Division and effective leader. He saw Bolshevism as a world danger and took part in anti-revolutionary activities across Germany. He was also active with Russian émigrés, founding the Russian National Political Committee under the presidency of General Vasily Biskupsky.

It was Pabst who gave the order that the captured communist leaders Rosa Luxemburg and Karl Liebknecht should be killed, and he would later boast, "I had them executed". At the time however, his official report claimed that he had taken them into protective custody but that they had been lost to an angry mob, a story that was quickly dismissed as fabrication. However Pabst would later claim that his initial intention had been for Liebknecht to be executed by firing squad as a German but for Luxemburg to be beaten to death by an angry mob as he felt her status as a Jew meant she deserved to die in a pogrom. Ultimately, however, both victims were shot after being tortured and beaten.

The leader of the Anti-Bolshevist League, Eduard Stadtler, claimed political responsibility for the extrajudicial murder of the revolutionary leaders. According to Stadtler, he contracted and gave the order to Waldemar Pabst. According to Pabst himself, the command was received from Gustav Noske in agreement with Friedrich Ebert.

Some of Pabst's lieutenants, including Horst von Pflugk-Harttung and Kurt Vogel, faced court martial for the killings although Pabst managed to ensure that his ally, Wilhelm Canaris, was in charge of proceedings and as a result the stiffest sentence handed down was the dismissal from service and two years imprisonment given to Vogel (whom witnesses had seen disposing of Luxemburg's body). Research by Klaus Gietinger on the trial of Luxemburg's murder has used the previously restricted papers of Pabst, held by the Federal Military Archives, and concluded he had been central to the plotting and cover-up of this execution. Pabst himself was not brought to court martial.

In 1969, Pabst wrote in a private letter:

"The fact is: the execution of my orders unfortunately did not take place as it should have. But it did take place, and for that, these German idiots should thank Noske and me on their knees, erect monuments to us, and have streets and squares named after us! Noske was exemplary at the time, and the party [SPD] (except for its semi-communist left wing) behaved impeccably in the affair. That I could not carry out the action without Noske's approval (with Ebert in the background) and also that I had to protect my officers is clear. But very few people understood why I was never questioned or brought up on charges, and why the court-martial went the way it did, Vogel was freed from prison, and so on. As a man of honour, I responded to the behaviour of the SPD of the time by keeping my mouth shut for 50 years about our cooperation [...] If it is not possible to avoid the truth and I get so angry I'm ready to explode, I will tell the truth, which I would like to avoid in the interest of the SPD."

=== Kapp Putsch ===
Pabst briefly left Germany to take on a role advising Major Alfred Fletcher, the commander of the Baltische Landeswehr in Latvia. However he was soon back in Germany, and became involved in the Nationale Vereinigung (National Union), a right-wing think tank formed by Wolfgang Kapp, Erich Ludendorff and others, and was central to the group's conspiracy to establish a rightist dictatorship. He served this group as secretary and supervisor of administrative affairs. In July 1919, Pabst attempted to organise a coup, when he convinced his superior General von Hoffmann, the official commander of the Guards Cavalry Rifle Division, to march on Berlin in order to crush a reported Communist uprising. However, with the troops already in the city's suburbs, General Georg Ludwig Rudolf Maercker got wind of the plot and convinced General von Hofmann that it was a bad idea. With this plan thwarted, Pabst and the conspirators shifted their attention away from the Reichswehr and on to the disillusioned veterans of the Freikorps.

Pabst played a leading role in the failed Kapp Putsch and, along with Wolfgang Kapp and the Marinebrigade Ehrhardt of Hermann Ehrhardt, was named by Gustav Noske as having the main responsibility for the action, even though it actually had support from higher up in the Reichswehr. In the immediate aftermath of the putsch, Pabst took refuge in Miklós Horthy's Hungary where he was soon joined by co-conspirator Walther von Lüttwitz. Despite the failure of the putsch, Pabst would often speak proudly of his involvement in the episode.

=== Austria ===
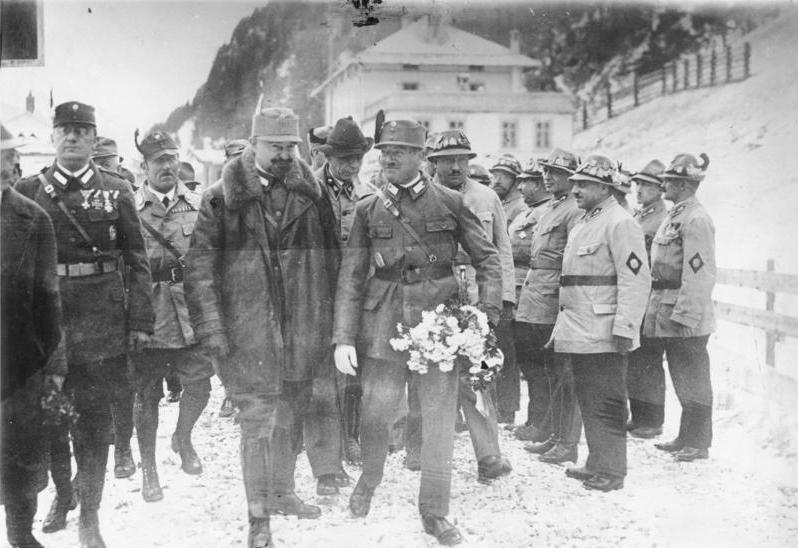
Pabst (carrying bouquet) entering Austria from Italy with Richard Steidle (bearded), c. 1930

Pabst eventually went to Austria, settling in the city of Innsbruck. In Austria he got together with the Heimwehr in Tyrol and played a central role in ensuring that the sometimes unstable dual leadership of Richard Steidle and Walter Pfrimer remained united. In Austria, Pabst proved vital in organising and disciplining the followers of the Heimwehr. Such was his organisational skill that Pabst, who declared himself a Major after fleeing to Austria, became known as Waldemar der Grosse to his Heimwehr units. He was appointed Chief of Staff of the Tyrolean Heimwehr on 1 May 1922. In this role, Pabst was able to organise several disparate right-wing militia groups under the single Heimwehr banner, although he was ultimately unsuccessful in fully removing local differences from what remained an eclectic movement. Nonetheless Pabst was able to make contact with Benito Mussolini and was able to secure funding for the Heimwehr from him.

Pabst was initially close to Johann Schober and won his support in 1929, when he suggested repositioning the Heimwehr as a pro-government political party. However, Schober's attempts to convert the Heimwehr into a force for pro-government moderation soon floundered, and he ordered the deportation of Pabst, by then recognised as the main organisational force behind the Heimwehr, to Germany the following year. With Pabst removed, Schober was able to ensure the removal of Steidle and his replacement as leader by the more compliant Ernst Rüdiger Starhemberg. A last desperate attempt by Pabst to induce Mussolini to withhold funding unless Schober embraced Pabst's policies failed and he was duly deported.

=== Later life ===
Returning to Germany, Pabst became a member of the Society for the Study of Fascism along with others such as Friedrich Minoux. In 1931 he wrote a pamphlet in which he set out a manifesto for a "White International"; in this he called for the replacement of the values of liberté, égalité, fraternité with a new European-wide order based on "a new Trinity: authority, order, justice". In 1934, Pabst was arrested during the Night of the Long Knives, due to his connections with Ernst Röhm. However, he was released from custody after six weeks, due to contacts with Canaris and several other powerful friends. He was vaguely linked to the Nazi Party, without ever joining or becoming particularly active on the party's behalf, but he did seek to forge three-way links between the Heimwehr, the Wehrmacht and his friend Walther Funk. Such efforts, however, were hamstrung by the fact that the Heimwehr had gone into steep decline following Pabst's deportation. Pabst had discussed the Austrian situation with Adolf Hitler during the latter's rise to power and Hitler had assured Pabst that once he took control of Germany he would concentrate much of his efforts on disseminating the Nazi message in Austria.

Settling into civilian life, he became an industrialist and eventually Director of Rheinmetall Borsig in Berlin. Pabst's non-involvement in Nazism, given his history in the far right, raised some suspicions and rumours circulated that he had been in contact with Canaris and similar figures on the right of the German resistance. Such rumours were never proven, but Pabst did leave Germany not long before the 20 July plot, and it has been suggested that he may have been aware that the attempt on Adolf Hitler's life was about to take place.

Having left Germany, Pabst settled in Switzerland, where he took a post with the arms manufacturer Oerlikon. After the World War II, Pabst was involved to some extent in the activities of the neo-Nazi Bruderschaften, small groups that existed across Europe and which attempted to co-ordinate their political activism. He returned to Germany in 1955, settling in Düsseldorf, and there became involved with the far right Deutsche Gemeinschaft, a minor group that was later absorbed into the Deutsche Reichspartei. He died in Düsseldorf in 1970 at the age of 89.

== Portrayals ==
The role of Pabst was played by Horst Drinda in the 1968 East German film Der Mord, der nie verjährt and by Hans-Michael Rehberg in the 1986 film Rosa Luxemburg.
