= Anton Rintelen =

Austrian academic, jurist and politician (1876–1946)

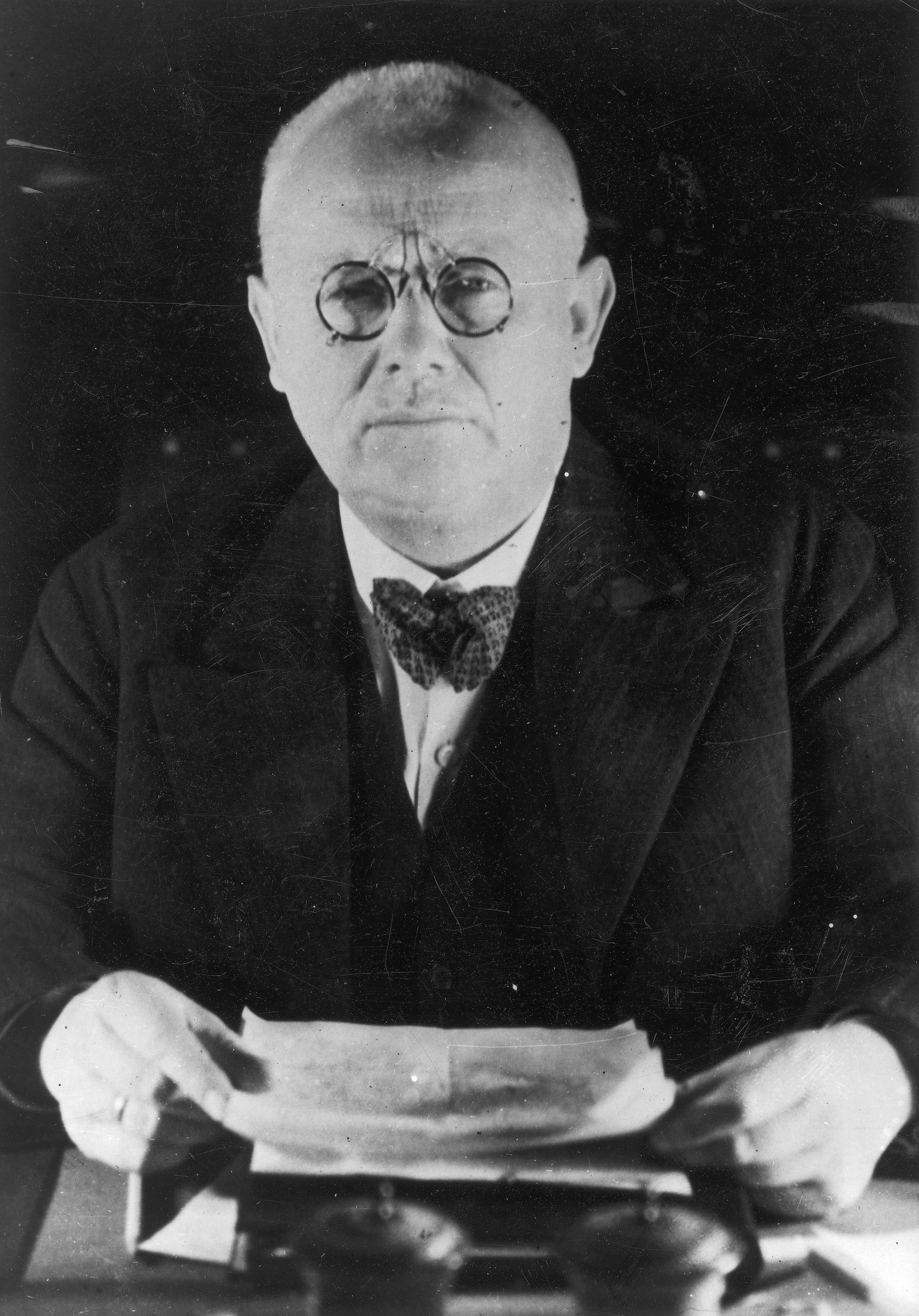
- Anton Rintelen c. 1929–1934

Minister of Education of Austria
- In office 20 May 1932 – 24 May 1933
- Chancellor: Engelbert Dollfuss
- Preceded by: Emmerich Czermak
- Succeeded by: Kurt Schuschnigg
- In office 25 June 1926 – 20 October 1926
- Chancellor: Rudolf Ramek
- Preceded by: Josef Resch
- Succeeded by: Richard Schmitz

Personal details
- Born: Antonius Ludwig Carl Florentius Paul Rintelen; 15 November 1876 Graz, Austria-Hungary
- Died: 28 January 1946 (aged 69) Graz, Allied-occupied Austria
- Party: Christian Social Party; Nazi Party
- Education: Charles University in Prague
- Known for: Having a leading role in the July Putsch

Anton Rintelen (born Antonius Ludwig Carl Florentius Paul Rintelen; 15 November 1876 – 28 January 1946) was an Austrian academic, jurist and politician. Initially associated with the right wing Christian Social Party, he became involved in the July Putsch, a Nazi coup d'état plot, in 1934.

== Early years ==
The son of a well-known lawyer, Rintelen was born in Graz. He studied law at University of Graz from 1894 to 1898, after which he became a lecturer in civil law at the university. He would later serve as a professor there. He was also a professor at the Charles University in Prague before taking up a career in politics with the Christian Social Party. He served the party as Landeshauptmann of Styria from 1919 to 1926 and again from 1928 to 1933, and as Minister of Education in 1926 and 1932–33. He was the president of the Federal Council of Austria in 1923. Rintelen was also the founder and President of Steirer Bank, although the scandal that followed the collapse of this initiative in 1926 was enough to see him lose his role as Landeshauptmann for a period.

In his role in Styria he was active in supporting the local Heimwehr leader Walter Pfrimer. He also maintained close links with another right-wing militia leader, Georg Escherich. Rintelen's links to the far right made him a target for leftists; in May 1921 a group of miners in St. Lorenzen attacked Rintelen, throwing him out a window and stoning him. Rintelen hoped to use the Heimwehr and related groups as a personal army to launch his own version of the March on Rome, and even unsuccessfully tried to enlist the aid of Benito Mussolini in this venture. He was sent to Rome in 1933 as Ambassador to Italy. Here, he became involved in intrigues with NSDAP leaders from Austria and Germany and worked to push Italian sentiments towards Nazism.

== July Putsch ==
Despite having been a member of his government, Rintelen became an opponent of Engelbert Dollfuss. In 1934 he planned a coup d'état under the direction of Theodor Habicht, Rudolf Weydenhammer, and Fridolin Glass, after which Rintelen was considered a prospective Chancellor. The plan was to broadcast a false report that Dollfuss had transferred his power to Rintelen. Rintelen wanted to quit at the last minute but the plan went ahead, albeit it proved a failure. Dollfuss was killed, but the government managed to crush the uprising, with over 100 Nazis being killed in street-fighting across the country. After the coup failed, Rintelen tried to kill himself via a gunshot to the chest. He was seriously injured, but survived. While Rintelen was in the hospital, an Austrian Jew, Josef Kraus, donated blood to save his life.

The Vienna papers carrying the story commented drily that 'if Dr. Rintelen had become Chancellor he would also have taken Jewish blood, but in a totally different fashion.'

Rintelen's involvement in the July Putsch saw him tried by a military court for high treason in 1935. However, Justice Minister Egon Berger-Waldenegg, the state leader of the Styrian Home Guard, instructed the public prosecutor to conduct the trial in such a way that he would not be sentenced to death. As such, Rintelen was sentenced to life imprisonment. He was released from prison in February 1938, a month before the Anschluss, but took no further part in politics. He died in 1946.
