= Rudolf Kanzler =

German surveyor and politician (1873–1956)

- Born: Rudolf Kanzler; February 26, 1873; Wasserburg am Inn, Upper Bavaria, German Empire
- Died: February 26, 1956 (aged 83); Munich, Upper Bavaria, West Germany
- Known for: Freikorps leader
- Political party: Centre Party

Rudolf Kanzler (26 February 1873 – 26 February 1956) was a German surveyor and politician who was involved in the organisation of Freikorps units after World War I.

A Roman Catholic, Kanzler was a member of the Centre Party and served this party in the Landtag of Bavaria as representative for Lichtenfels from 1905 to 1918. Noted for his anti-communism, he organised a Bürgerwehr or militia against the communists in Rosenheim in 1919. This group grew into the Freikorps Chiemgau, for a time the largest single Freikorps in Germany, under the command of Kanzler who became known as the 'White General'. Kanzler became an ally of the rightist militant Georg Escherich and soon led his own Organisation Kanzler or 'Orka' in imitation of Escherich's Orgesch. Like his ally he became close to Richard Steidle in Austria and helped him in the organisation of the Heimwehr.

Kanzler stood down from his Freikorps roles in 1921, and later became a member of Carl Spruner von Mertz's Bayerischer Heimat- und Königsbund, a monarchist group that was outlawed in 1933 after the formation of the Nazi Party regime. Indeed, Kanzler had been an early leader of this group, which – beyond a nostalgically sentimental attachment to the House of Wittelsbach – had minimal function, before giving way to General von Krafft. Kanzler was later arrested and charged with treason during the Third Reich for attempting to promote monarchism and for cooperating with the Black Front of Otto Strasser. However, Kanzler was acquitted. Following his death, on his 83rd birthday, he was buried in his home town of Wasserburg am Inn.
