= Ignaz Seipel =

Chancellor of Austria (1922–1924; 1926–1929)

The Reverend Ignaz Seipel
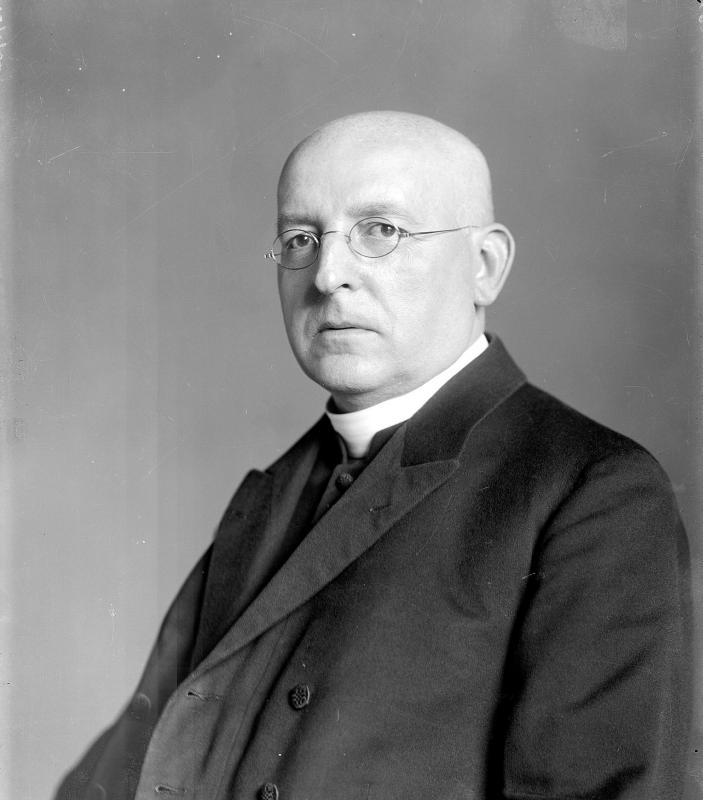

Chancellor of Austria
- In office 20 October 1926 – 4 May 1929
- President: Michael Hainisch; Wilhelm Miklas
- Vice-Chancellor: Franz Dinghofer; Karl Hartleb
- Preceded by: Rudolf Ramek
- Succeeded by: Ernst Streeruwitz
- In office 31 May 1922 – 20 November 1924
- President: Michael Hainisch
- Vice-Chancellor: Felix Frank
- Preceded by: Johannes Schober
- Succeeded by: Rudolf Ramek

Minister of Foreign Affairs
- In office 30 September 1930 – 4 December 1930
- Preceded by: Johannes Schober
- Succeeded by: Johannes Schober
- In office 20 October 1926 – 4 May 1929
- Preceded by: Rudolf Ramek
- Succeeded by: Ernst Streeruwitz

Minister of Social Welfare
- In office 27 October 1918 – 11 November 1918
- Prime Minister: Heinrich Lammasch
- Preceded by: Viktor Mataja
- Succeeded by: Ferdinand Hanusch

Personal details
- Born: 19 July 1876 Vienna, Austria-Hungary
- Died: 2 August 1932 (aged 56) Pernitz, Austria
- Resting place: Vienna Central Cemetery
- Party: Christian Social Party
- Education: University of Vienna

Ignaz Seipel (19 July 1876 – 2 August 1932) was an Austrian Catholic priest and politician who served as the Chancellor of the First Austrian Republic twice, from 1922 to 1924 and from 1926 to 1929. The leader of the Christian Social Party, he is considered one of the most prominent Austrian statesmen of the interwar period.

Seipel grew up in the town of Meidling, near Vienna, where he completed his studies before enrolling at the University of Vienna. He studied theology and was ordained as a priest in 1899. After serving in a rural parish, he returned to the imperial capital to pursue a doctorate. In 1908, he became an assistant professor of moral theology at the University of Vienna, and a year later, a full professor of the same discipline at the University of Salzburg, where he taught for the next eight years.

Seipel took an interest in social, educational, and economic issues and became friends with Heinrich Lammasch, the last Imperial Minister-President, who appointed him Minister of Social Welfare in his cabinet in late 1918. Although a monarchist, Seipel played a key role in helping the Christian Socialists accept the new republican system. He built up political Catholicism by aligning the clericals with Vienna's large bourgeoisie, often of Jewish descent. Over time, his political stance evolved: while initially a strong supporter of the Austria–Hungary and the Habsburg dynasty, after World War I, he adopted a conciliatory approach toward socialists and democracy to prevent the establishment of a left-wing dictatorship. Later, between 1922 and 1924, he distanced himself from the socialists, forming alliances with capitalist and anti-Marxist groups.

A dominant figure in Austrian politics during the 1920s, Seipel served as Chancellor from 31 May 1922 to 3 April 1929, except for a period between 1924 and 1926. In 1922, he managed to end severe inflation through an international stabilisation loan, although this meant subjecting state economic policy to the supervision of the League of Nations. Deeply anti-socialist, he led a government coalition of Christian Socialists and Pan-Germans. Disillusioned with democracy by 1927, Seipel supported constitutional reforms to make a more authoritarian system. He died in 1932, suffering from diabetes and tuberculosis.

== Life ==
=== Academician and priest ===
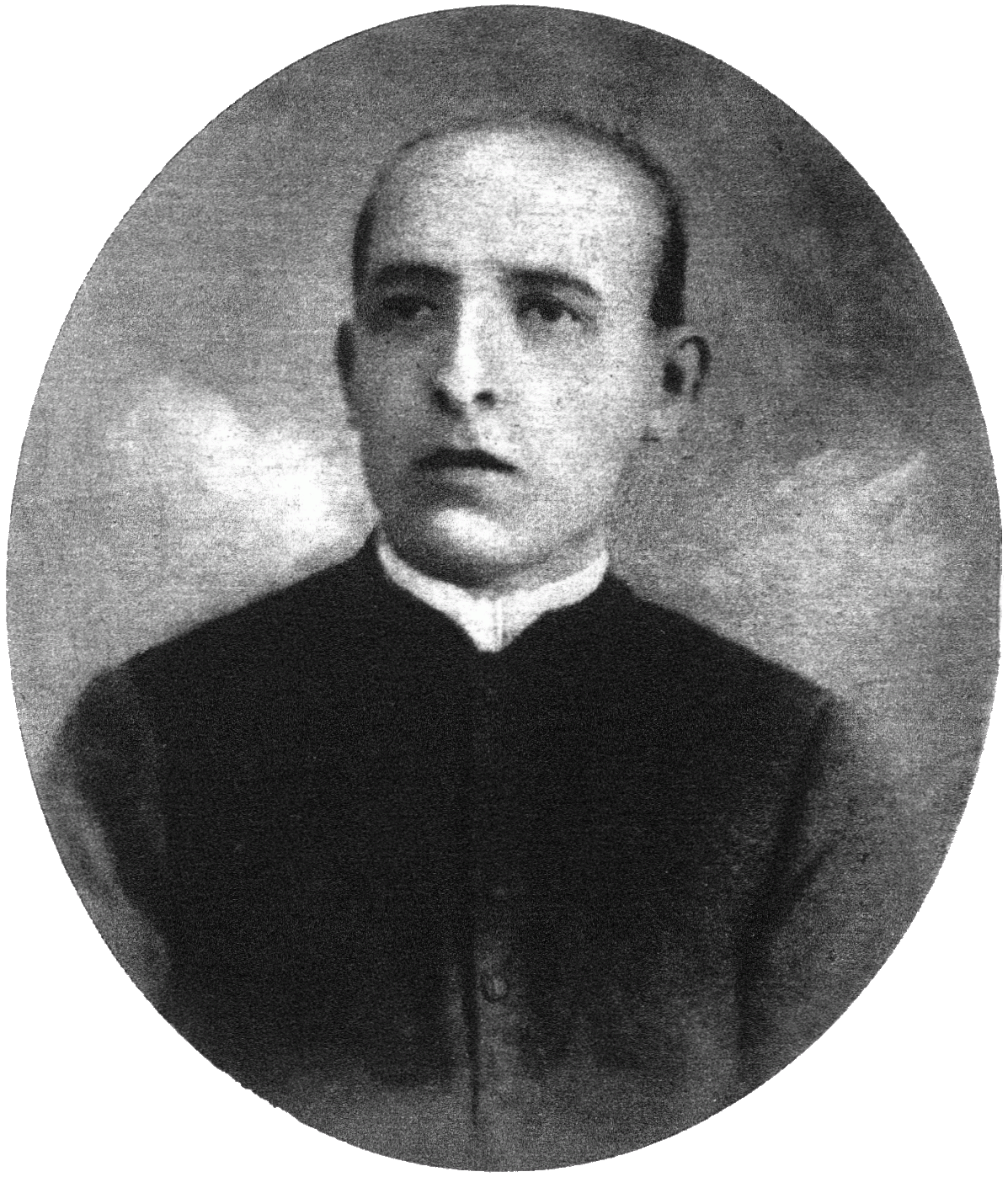
Seipel in 1899

The son of a Viennese carriage driver, Seipel graduated from an academic high school (Staatsgymnasium) in Vienna in 1895, then studied Catholic theology at the University of Vienna. He was ordained a priest on 23 July 1899 and received his doctorate in theology in 1903. Seipel was a member or honorary member of numerous Catholic student fraternities.

In his 1907 work reflecting Catholic social teaching, Ethical Teachings on Economics of the Church Fathers, he was the first to use the phrase "economic ethics". In 1908, he joined the Catholic Theological Faculty of the University of Vienna. From 1909 to 1917, he was professor of moral theology at the University of Salzburg. There, he published his study Nation and State (1916), which helped cement his later prominent role in the Christian Social Party. In the book he viewed the state – the self-governing political entity – as the primary justification of sovereignty, rather than the nation – a group that shares a common culture, as speakers of German. In 1917, he was appointed professor at the University of Vienna, succeeding the moral theologian Franz Martin Schindler.

=== Politician ===
On 27 October 1918, during the final days of the Austro-Hungarian Empire, Emperor Karl I appointed Seipel Minister of Public Works and Social Welfare in the ministry of Heinrich Lammasch, the last "imperial and royal" government of the Empire. At the beginning of November 1918, Seipel handed over his official duties to the government of Karl Renner of the Social Democratic Party of Austria. It had been appointed on 30 October 1918 by the State Council of German-Austria, the executive body of the short-lived Republic of German-Austria. The Lammasch ministry remained formally in office at the request of the Emperor until his own withdrawal. While still an imperial minister, Seipel was involved in formulating the declaration of abdication that the Emperor signed on 11 November 1918. On the same day, the Emperor dismissed the Lammasch ministry.

On 16 February 1919, Seipel was elected on the Christian Social ticket to the Constituent National Assembly, the body that adopted the constitution for the First Austrian Republic, which replaced the Republic of German-Austria. Seipel's parliamentary group elected him to the club presidium, one of its leadership bodies.

Seipel prevented the party from splitting in 1918 over the question of the abolition of the monarchy that was advocated by the Social Democrats and the greater Germans, the name for those who wanted Austria to join the German Reich (the Weimar Republic). In March 1919, he spoke out against the two parties' annexation euphoria because annexation of German Austria to the German Reich was generally rejected by the victorious Allies of World War I and would endanger the peace treaty. In 1920, he nevertheless broke the Christian Social Party away from the coalition with the Social Democrats and allied with the nationalist Greater German People's Party.

Although Seipel supported the Austrian Republic's new parliamentary democracy, he was clearly skeptical of it. During the preliminary deliberations on the Federal Constitution in 1920 and thereafter in 1922, Seipel advocated a partial weakening of parliament in favor of a federal president endowed with significantly more extensive powers.

At the same time, Seipel supported the development of militant right-wing groups in Vienna, as seen above all in the fact that beginning in March 1920, he was a board member of the secret Association for Order and Law (Vereinigung für Ordnung und Recht). The group included monarchist and greater German representatives as well as military figures. It planned the forcible suppression of the Social Democrats and worked closely with the Bavarian right-wing radicals around Georg Escherich.

In September 1920, in a speech that was clearly tinged with anti-semitism, Seipel called for a numerus clausus – an enrollment limit – for Jews at higher-level schools, colleges, and universities "according to population".

==== Chancellor of Austria ====
Seipel served as chairman of the Christian Social Party (CS) from 1921 to 1930. At his party's request, he was Chancellor of Austria in a Christian Social–German coalition from 31 May 1922 to 20 November 1924. During his first term, he personally coordinated the distribution of industry funds to right-wing militias. Seipel's primary concern was with their military efficiency; ideological proximity to the CS party was secondary. He focused on the right-wing Front Fighters Union of German Austria under the anti-Semite Hermann Hiltl, which he also helped re-arm with financial resources from the Hungarian Horthy regime.

Seipel reorganised state finances with the aid of a League of Nations loan, which was obtained when Austria officially renounced annexation to Germany. In order to fight the hyperinflation of the krone currency, the government prepared for the introduction of the schilling on 1 March 1925 and re-founded Austria's central bank, the Österreichische Nationalbank, with the task of securing monetary stability.

In the fall of 1924, the Bavarian Immigration Police considered deporting Adolf Hitler from Bavaria to Austria if he were released from prison early. Hitler had been serving time at Landsberg Prison in Bavaria since April 1924 following his failed Beer Hall Putsch in 1923. Seipel did not want the putschist and troublemaker back in Austria and sent Bavaria a statement saying that Hitler had become a German by serving in its army. Bavaria attested that Austria had recognized the Austrian citizenship of German soldiers in other cases, but Seipel adhered to his legal opinion.

===== Assassination attempt and resignation =====
After fierce criticism from his own party and an assassination attempt on 1 June 1924, he resigned on 8 November 1924 but remained chairman of the Christian Socialist Deputies' Association. The would-be assassin, Karl Jaworek (or Jawurek), blamed Seipel for his poverty and shot the Chancellor at close range on the platform of a Vienna train station. Jaworek was sentenced to five years of hard labor.

Theodor Körner, a retired general and successful Social Democratic candidate for parliament in 1924, paid tribute to Seipel during the election campaign. The Innsbruck newspaper Volkszeitung quoted him saying that Seipel was "as a character of integrity in every respect, a diligent, selfless worker".

===== Reelection and second term =====
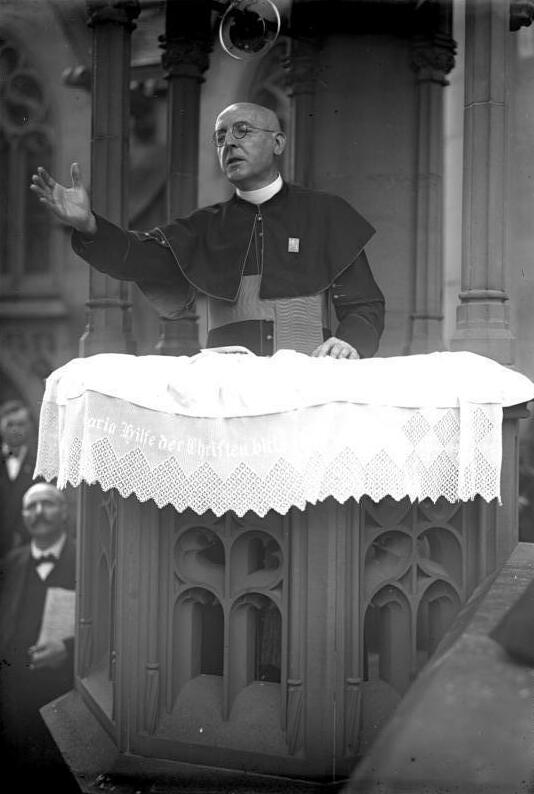
Seipel preaching at Bingen, 1929

From 1926 to 1929, Seipel was again Chancellor, fighting in particular against the Social Democrats. He united the CS with the Greater German People's Party, the Landbund (Rural Federation), and the National Socialist "Riehl and Schulz Group" to form an anti-Marxist front (the "Citizens' Bloc"). After the National Assembly election of 1927 in which Seipel's bloc won the majority of seats, there was a more rapid growth in the fundamental attitude that opposed Austrian democracy. With the help of Austrian industrialists, Chancellor Seipel strengthened the role of the increasingly anti-democratic Heimwehr and remained its most influential advocate until his death. This made him the great enemy of the Social Democrats.

In the Austrian town of Schattendorf on 30 January 1927, members of a right-wing paramilitary group fired on Social Democratic demonstrators, including members of its paramilitary Republican Protection League (Republikanischer Schutzbund), killing two and wounding five. The acquittal of the men charged in the deaths led to the July Revolt of 1927 in Vienna, during which police killed 89 protestors and wounded over 600. Afterwards, Social Democrats called Seipel a "prelate without clemency", a "prelate without mercy" and a "blood prelate". In his statement before the lower house of parliament, the National Council, on 26 July 1927, Seipel said, "In these days of misfortune, do not ask anything of the parliament and the government that would seem merciful to the victims and the guilty but would be cruel to the wounded republic." Seipel's statement was followed by an intensely heated parliamentary debate. The opposition seized on the phrase "without mercy" and linked it to their criticism of the excessive police action, for which they blamed Police Commissioner and former Austrian chancellor Johann Schober.

In 1928, Seipel, in agreement with Karl Buresch, the governor of Lower Austria, championed the interests of the Heimwehr by approving its march in Wiener Neustadt, as well as one by the Republican Protection League, against the express wish of Wiener Neustadt Mayor Anton Ofenböck. As Chancellor, Seipel was able to show his strength with a massive contingent of police and military. There were no violent incidents on the days of the marches.

Seipel resigned from the office of chancellor on 4 April 1929, although he continued in office until 4 May, when he was succeeded as head of government by Ernst Streeruwitz, also of the Christian Social Party. In all, five federal governments of the First Republic were under Seipel's leadership.

=== Post-chancellorship and contemporary assessments ===
Seipel was not satisfied with the First Republic's form of government. He was a major driver behind the push to strengthen the role of the federal president, which was realized in the 1929 amendment to the federal constitution. Seipel negotiated it with the Social Democrats and "probably thought of himself as the future holder of the office". Under the political slogan of "true democracy", he proposed a cleansing of the system from the "evil of party rule":

I myself do not attach too much importance to the mere reform of the electoral law and procedures; I see the root of the evil in the kind of party rule which developed in the times of constitutional monarchy and which has shot up unchecked after the removal of the correction that the monarchy provided. In my view, the one who saves democracy is the one who purifies it from party rule and thereby restores it again.

— Ignaz Seipel, "Tübingen Speech", reprinted in Seipel's The Struggle for the Austrian Constitution, 1930

In 1930, Seipel was briefly Austrian foreign minister in the cabinet of Carl Vaugoin. After the bankruptcy of the Creditanstalt Bank in 1931, he was to take over the reins of government again, but was unsuccessful in forming a coalition.

Decades later, Bruno Kreisky, Social Democratic Federal Chancellor from 1970 to 1983, criticized his own party for the 1931 events. Seipel had offered Otto Bauer, the head of the Social Democrats, a coalition at the height of the world economic crisis. The party executive, however, had not taken him up on it. "In retrospect, it seems to me clearly wrong not to have pushed harder for a compromise to be in government at such a critical moment. [...] In my opinion, this was the last chance to save Austrian democracy," Kreisky wrote in 1986.

Seipel had seen in the Jews a class that represented mobile large capital and a "certain kind of merchant mentality" by which the people felt threatened in their economic existence. Austria, Seipel said, was "in danger of being dominated economically, culturally, and politically by the Jews." As a solution to the so-called Jewish question, he proposed recognizing the Jews as a national minority.

While Seipel's politics were initially characterized by a belief in Austria's self-reliance, he later took the view that without the German Reich, Austrian politics were not meaningful.

=== Death ===
Seipel suffered from tuberculosis and also from diabetes as a consequences of the assassination attempt against him. In December 1930 he went to Merano for a cure, where he received a telegram from Pope Pius XI wishing him a speedy recovery so that he could "return to his so meritorious activity". He died in 1932 in the Lower Austrian sanatorium Wienerwald. Otto Bauer dedicated an obituary to him in the Arbeiter-Zeitung (Workers' Newspaper), in which he attested to Seipel's "honest inner conviction":

== Commemorations ==
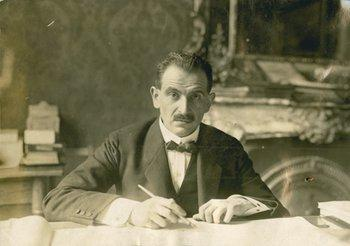
Otto Bauer in 1919

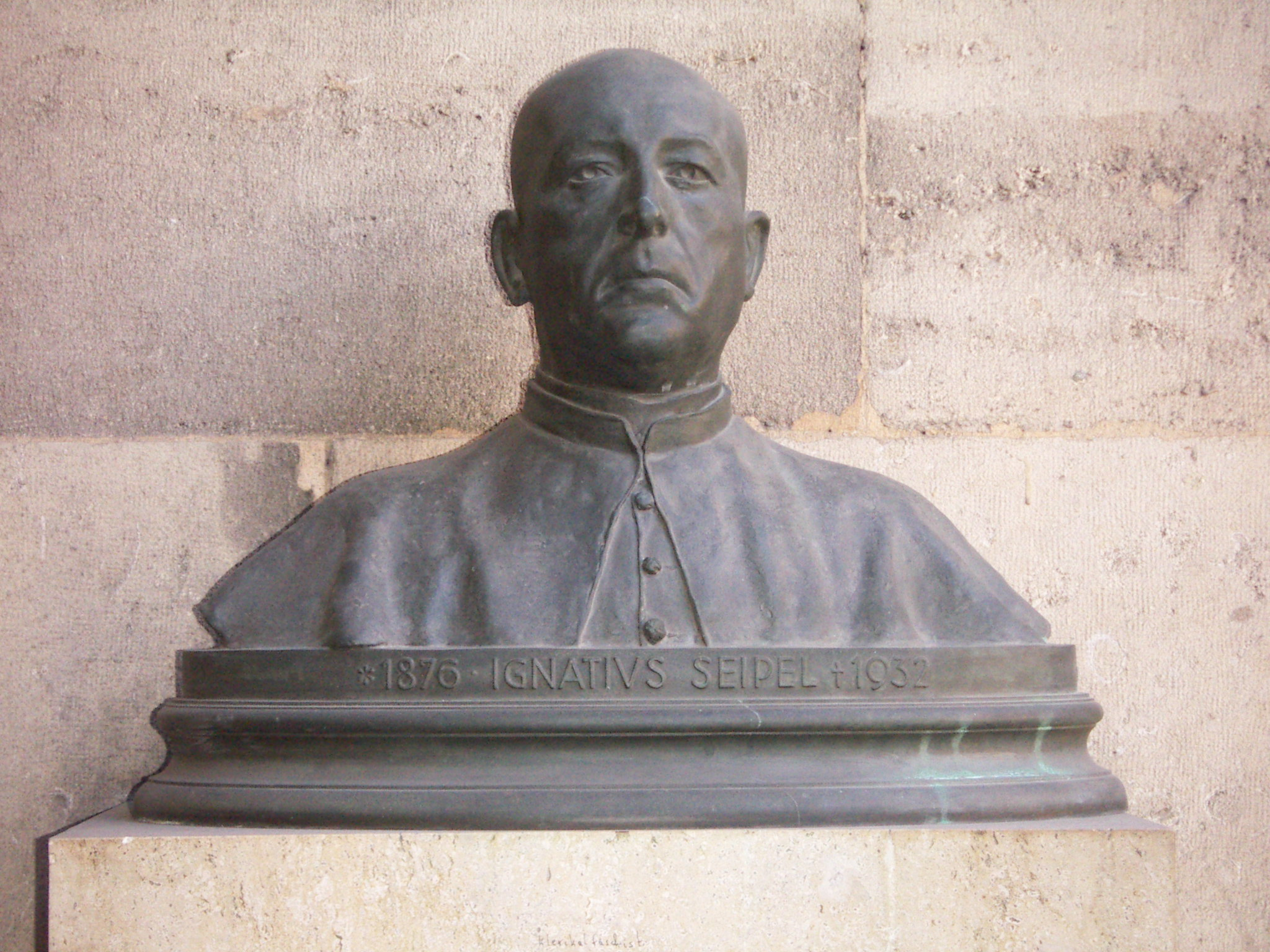
Memorial to Seipel at the University of Vienna

He fought us with all means and all weapons; we fought him too. The fact that he was not a man of compromise, but a man who felt comfortable only in ruthless struggle, may often, may especially in the years since 1927, have been a source of misfortune for the country; but the one who is himself a fighter will not deny human respect even to the genuine fighter in the camp of the opponent. Now he is dead; the bourgeois parties have no personality to rise above mediocrity. At his bier, we too can say of him: he was a man, taken all in all. The soldier does not refuse the last military honors to the fallen enemy. So to the great enemy we also send three salvos over the bier.

— Otto Bauer, Ignaz Seipel. In: Arbeiter-Zeitung N. 214, 3. August 1932, p. 3.

Since Seipel was regarded by the Social Democrats as the epitome of reaction and of the alliance between clericalism and capitalism, the article was received with incomprehension by the party base. Bauer felt compelled to point out in another article the difference between "emotional socialists and trained Marxists". While the sentimental socialist hates the capitalist and the spokesmen of the capitalist world, the Marxist understands his opponents as creatures of a hostile social order. Seipel "is to us, precisely because we are Marxists, because he fought us and we fought him, not a villain, but the "creature of conditions of which he remains socially, however much he may subjectively rise above them"."

The corporatist Federal State of Austria (1934–1938) considered Seipel to be the founding father of the regime. As Seipel's final resting place, the Christ the King Church was built in Vienna's working-class district of Rudolfsheim-Fünfhaus, six blocks from Seipel's birthplace, on the initiative of the women's and workers' rights activist Hildegard Burjan and supported by Chancellor Engelbert Dollfuss. Seipel's coffin was interred in the crypt of the church in the fall of 1934. Dollfuss had been assassinated by a Nazi two months earlier. His successor Kurt Schuschnigg had Dollfuss buried there; the regime named the church the "Seipel-Dollfuss Memorial Church".

After the 1938 annexation of Austria by Nazi Germany, it had both coffins reburied in 1939: Seipel's coffin was moved to a grave of honor at the Vienna Central Cemetery. The grave is located directly next to the presidential crypt in front of the St. Charles Borromeo Cemetery Church, then called the "Dr. Karl Lueger Memorial Church" after the founder of the Christian Social Party. Dollfuss was buried in the Hietzing Cemetery in Vienna.

On 27 April 1934, the dictatorial city administration renamed the Ring of 12 November, a part of Vienna's Ringstrasse commemorating the founding of the Republic, to the Dr. Ignaz Seipel-Ring in the section in front of the Austrian Parliament Building. In 1940, it was renamed after the Nazi Gauleiter Josef Bürckel; on 27 April 1945, it became Seipel-Ring again, and on 8 July 1956, it was given its present name, Dr.-Karl Renner-Ring.

== In the arts ==
In Hugo Bettauer's 1922 novel Die Stadt ohne Juden (The City Without Jews), the character of the Christian Socialist Chancellor Dr. Karl Schwertfeger, who has all Jews expelled from the country, is based on Seipel. Hans Karl Breslauer's 1924 film of the same name was based on Bettauer's book.

== Biographies in English ==
- Seipel, Ignaz: Christian statesman in a time of crisis by Klemens Von Klemperer (Princeton University Press, 1972, ISBN 0-691-05197-6)
- Fascist Movements in Austria: from Schönerer to Hitler by F. L. (Francis Ludwig) Carsten (London, 1977, ISBN 0-8039-9992-5, ISBN 0-8039-9857-0)
- Jamie Andrew, McGregor Bulloch, The Promotion of an Austrian Identity 1918-1938, PhD dissertation (Ch. 1 is about Seipel's political theory)
- Günter Bischof, Fritz Plasser, Eva Maltschnig (Eds.), Austrian Lives (2012), "Ignaz Seipel (1876-1932). Founding Father of the Austrian Republic" by John Deak, pp. 32–55.

Political offices
Preceded by Johannes Schober	Chancellor of Austria; 1922–1924	Succeeded by Rudolf Ramek
Preceded by Rudolf Ramek	Chancellor of Austria; 1926–1929	Succeeded by Ernst Streeruwitz
Preceded by Rudolf Ramek	Foreign Minister of Austria; 1926–1929	Succeeded by Ernst Streeruwitz
Preceded by Johannes Schober	Foreign Minister of Austria; 1930	Succeeded by Johannes Schober
