= Otto Ender =

Austrian chancellor, politician and lawyer (1875–1960)

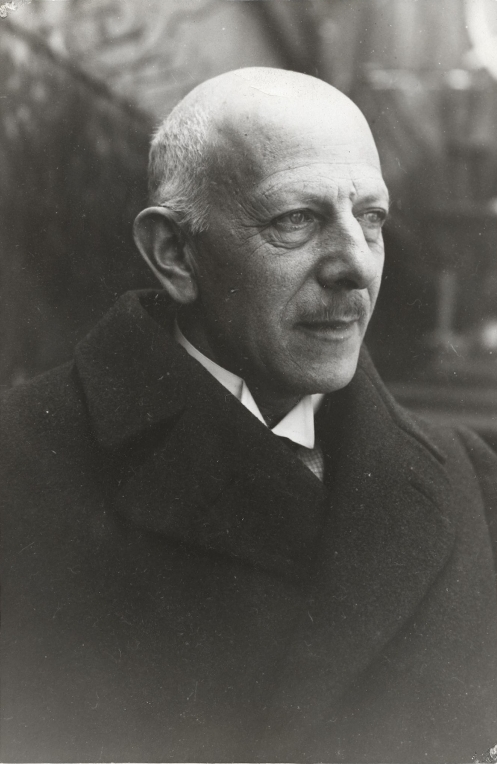

Chancellor of Austria
- In office 4 December 1930 – 20 June 1931
- President: Wilhelm Miklas
- Vice-Chancellor: Johann Schober
- Preceded by: Carl Vaugoin
- Succeeded by: Karl Buresch

President of the Court of Audit
- In office 15 July 1934 – 31 August 1938
- Preceded by: Max Wladimir von Beck
- Succeeded by: Leopold Petznek

President of the Federal Council
- In office 1 June 1933 – 30 November 1933
- Preceded by: Franz Stumpf
- Succeeded by: Theodor Körner
- In office 1 December 1928 – 31 May 1929
- Preceded by: Richard Steidle
- Succeeded by: Johann Schorsch
- In office 1 June 1924 – 30 November 1924
- Preceded by: Richard Steidle
- Succeeded by: Jakob Reumann

Governor of Vorarlberg
- In office 14 July 1931 – 24 July 1934
- Preceded by: Ferdinand Redler
- Succeeded by: Ernst Winsauer
- In office 3 November 1918 – 9 December 1930
- Preceded by: Adolf Rhomberg
- Succeeded by: Ferdinand Redler

Personal details
- Born: 24 December 1875 Altach, Vorarlberg, Austria-Hungary
- Died: 25 June 1960 (aged 84) Bregenz, Vorarlberg, Austria
- Political party: Christian Social Party

Otto Ender (24 December 1875 – 25 June 1960) was an Austrian political figure. He served as the chancellor of Austria between 1930 and 1931.

== Early life and education ==
Ender, the first son of Herman and Victoria Ender, was born in Altach, Vorarlberg. The families of both parents were among the political elite of the village. The maternal great-grandfather, John Walser, was the first superintendent of the municipality created in 1801. The paternal grandfather, Johann Jakob final, had held the same position for 1835–1844 and 1850–1857. From 1861 to 1866 Johann Jacob was a member of the Conservative party in the Parliament of Vorarlberg.

Ender studied at the Stella Matutina Jesuit college in Feldkirch from 1888 to 1896. After matriculation in 1896 he studied at the universities of Innsbruck, Vienna, Prague and Freiburg. In 1901 he received his doctorate from the University of Innsbruck. In 1901–02, he completed a legal internship year at the district court Feldkirch. From 1902 to 1908 he was articled clerk in Feldkirch and Vienna. In 1908 he opened his own law firm in Bregenz. The same year he married Maria Rusch. Thery had four sons and three daughters.

In the following years, Ender became more engaged in the public. He gave lectures on the introduction of the land register. In 1914, he was appointed executive director of the State Mortgage Bank. After the war began, in the summer of 1914, he became head of the state purchasing agency and the Bregenzer branch of the War Grain transportation agency and member of the National Committee of Social Welfare.

From 1915 to 1918, he was a member of the Nutrition Council in Vienna. In 1917/18, he was president of the building committee for the establishment of the sanatorium Gaisbühel. His professional qualifications were recognized in the War years by Media and lawyers. This professional experience was the foundation on which he could build up in the inter-wars period, his successful political career.

== Political career ==
In November 1918, he founded an independent self-management of Tyrol Vorarlberg, together with Jodok Fink and Franz Loser. In the four state elections of the First Republic (1919, 1923, 1928 and 1932) he won for his Christian Social Party with 53–63% of the vote. He served as the governor of Vorarlberg from 1918 to 1930 and again from 1931 to 1934. He was the president of the Federal Council of Austria three times in 1920s and 1930s.

After the 1930 legislative election, Ender became Chancellor of Austria on 4 December, however, his cabinet was brought down soon after upon the collapse of the Creditanstalt bank in May 1931. From 1934 to 1938, he was President of the Austrian Court of Audit. In March 1938, his political career ended with the Anschluss annexation of Austria by Nazi Germany. He was imprisoned by the Gestapo in March 1938, and remained as such until September 1938. He was forced to retire by Nazi government in 1939 and was expelled from the country.

== Death and legacy ==
Otto Ender died on 25 June 1960 and was buried in the municipal cemetery in Bregenz. To this day, the State of Vorarlberg awards scholarships to the students through the Dr. Otto Ender Foundation.

His achievements are as founder and designer of the province of Vorarlberg, in terms of economic policy such as the establishment of the agricultural district authority, by beginning of the expansion of road network in the 1920s, establishing an agricultural school, expanding of the Vorarlberg water power with the purchase of Vorarlberg's power plants, and the establishment of the Vorarlberg Illwerke and by co-operating with the democratic constitutions of 1920 and 1923.

Political offices
Preceded by Carl Vaugoin	Chancellor of Austria; 1930–1931	Succeeded by Karl Buresch
