= Richard Steidle =

Austrian politician (1881–1940)

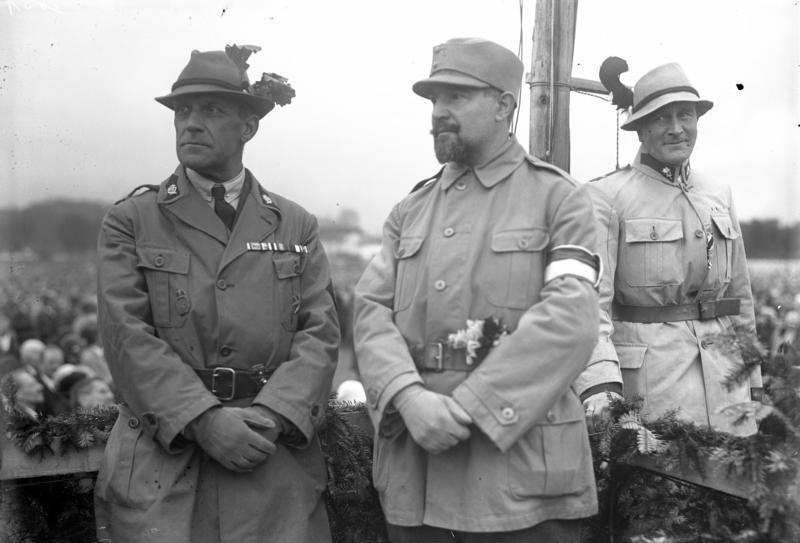
- Steidle (middle), 1930
- Born: 20 September 1881; Meran, Tyrol, Austria-Hungary
- Died: 30 August 1940 (aged 58); Buchenwald concentration camp, Bavaria, Nazi Germany
- Cause of death: Gunshot wounds
- Citizenship: Austrian
- Education: Doctor of jurisprudence
- Alma mater: University of Innsbruck
- Occupation: Lawyer
- Known for: Leader of the Heimwehr in Tyrol
- Title: Heimwehr leader
- Term: 1927-1930
- Successor: Ernst Rüdiger Starhemberg
- Political party: Christian Social Party

Richard Steidle (20 September 1881 – 30 August 1940) was an Austrian lawyer and the leader of the paramilitary Heimwehr in Tyrol. He was a leading representative of the pro-independence tendency on the far right of Austrian politics and as such was opposed to the Nazi Party which supported the incorporation of Austria into a Großdeutschland. Following the Anschluss, Steidle was sent to the Buchenwald concentration camp, where he was killed in 1940.

== Early life ==
Steidle was born in the Untermais district of Meran (Merano), South Tyrol, with his father having originally come from the Duchy of Württemberg. Steidle studied at the University of Innsbruck, completing his doctorate in jurisprudence. Unfit for military service when the First World War broke out in 1914 he instead became an assistant to a military court and after the war worked as a lawyer in Innsbruck.

== Emergence ==
Steidle was closely associated with the Tirolische Bauernbund, a peasants group affiliated to the Christian Social Party. As part of his involvement in this group he set up a militia in Innsbruck to oppose the activities of the Social Democrats, whom he saw as fomenting revolution in the city. Having already been made Landesrat of Tyrol in October, Steidle sought to consolidate the power of his militia group by forging links with leaders of similar rightist groups in south Germany such as Georg Escherich, Rudolf Kanzler and Franz Ritter von Epp. Steidle also built a career in politics alongside his militia activity and represented the Christian Social Party in the Tyrolean Landtag from 1919 to 1934 and also sat in the Bundesrat from 1922 to 1931, twice chairing the body.

The Heimwehr in Tyrol was established on 15 May 1920 with Steidle confirmed as the group's Landesführer. The new group's stated intention was the prevention of further loss of territory to Italy, following the loss of Steidle's homeland. For his part Steidle saw the sole aim of Heimwehr as being anti-communism and rejected the antisemitism that became the hallmark of other leaders. He summed up his opinion by arguing that he hated only Jewish Marxists and that patriotic Jews were welcome in the Heimwehr. Despite this Steidle had previously been a member of the Antisemitenbund in 1919. His newly moderated views caused some controversy within the Heimwehr and led to Steidle splitting from his former ally Walter Pfrimer, the regional leader in Styria and a staunch antisemite.

In the early 1920s he advocated the union of Tyrol with Germany because of the increasingly liberal slant of the government in Vienna. Although he would backtrack from this idea he nonetheless maintained links with the right in Germany during the early 1920s, receiving weapons from Georg Escherich and Rudolf Kanzler whilst he took on as his deputy Waldemar Pabst after he fled Germany following the failure of the Kapp Putsch.

== Leadership ==
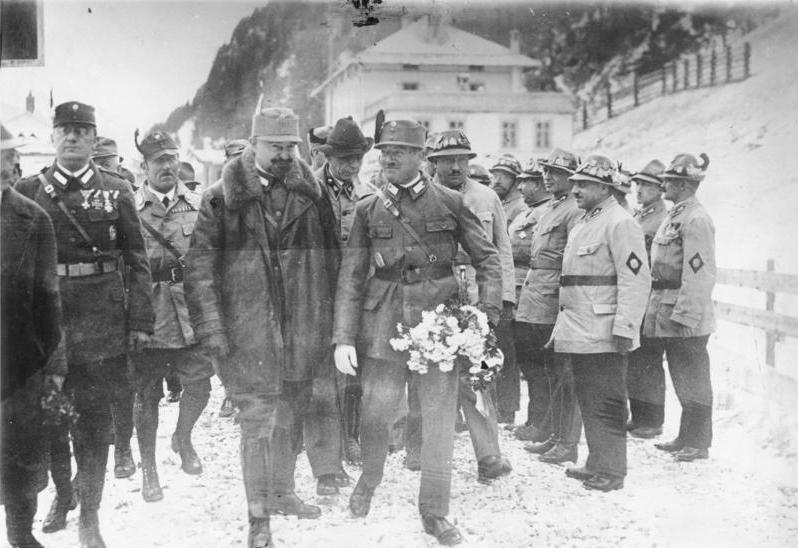
Steidle (bearded) accompanying Waldemar Pabst (carrying bouquet) on his entry to Austria from Italy, c. 1930

Having become one of the leading figures in the Heimwehr, Steidle was in 1927 chosen as the group's overall leader in a largely unsuccessful attempt to create unity amongst the disparate regional groups. In this role he worked closely with Waldemar Pabst in an attempt to improve the organisation of the Heimwehr, with Steidle seeking to build up the Heimwehr as a political movement and Pabst concentrating on improving the military side of the group. Now an important figure, Steidle enjoyed a good relationship with Johann Schober and was considered for a place in his third government, although no appointment was made. At this time however Steidle still maintained an ambiguous attitude towards the possibility of Anschluss despite his membership of the Austrian nationalist Christian Social Party. He also served as president of the Österreichischer Alpenverein for a time.

As leader of the Heimwehr he attempted to unite the movement behind an agreed platform of corporatist fascism in 1930 by writing the so-called 'Korneuburger Oath'. However agreement could not be reached with the regional leaders and indeed the oath only threw divisions into an even sharper focus as some regions refused to countenance it. By the end of the year Steidle was forced to relinquish his role as overall head of the movement in favour of Ernst Rüdiger Starhemberg.

== Later years ==
Steidle grew closer to the anti-Nazism of the Austrofascists who came to dominate Austrian politics in the mid-1930s and in 1934 he was appointed Consul general in Trieste under Kurt Schuschnigg's government. Steidle held this position until the Anschluss when, along with many of his fellow government officials, he was sent to Buchenwald.

Steidle was sent to the camp on the basis that in his roles of Landesrat of Tyrol from March 1933 to November 1934 and security director of Tyrol in late 1933 he had allegedly treated members of the outlawed Austrian Nazi Party with undue harshness. In June 1933, two Nazis tried to assassinate Steidle, wounding him in the forearm. One of the perpetrators, Werner von Alvensleben, was arrested and sentenced to three years in prison for attempted murder.

Steidle was shot and killed by camp guards at Buchenwald on 30 August 1940. According to official reports he had been in the act of attempting to escape from Buchenwald when he was gunned down.
