= Georg Escherich =

German politician (1870–1941)

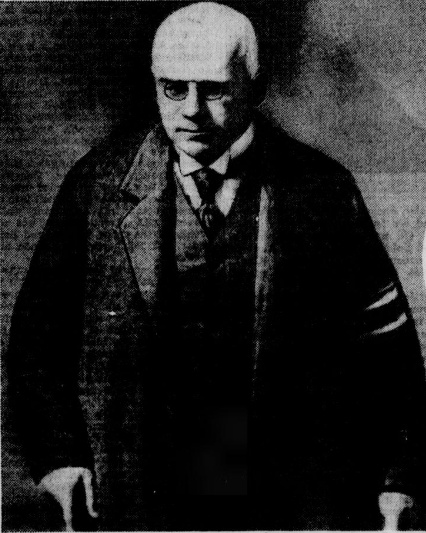

Georg Escherich (born 4 January 1870 in Schwandorf – died 26 August 1941 in Munich) was a German politician, representative of the Bavarian People's Party. By profession he was a forester.

In 1919 he became head of the Bavarian Einwohnerwehr, anti-communist home guard groups set up by General Ludwig Maercker. The following year Escherich organised his supporters into the 'Orgesch' (from 'Organisation Escherich), an antisemitic paramilitary group. This new group quickly established links with the Heimwehr in Austria and gave weapons to the units commanded by Richard Steidle and Walter Pfrimer. Escherich was a close ally of Rudolf Kanzler, the leader of 'Orka', who was also close to the Heimwehr.

The Orgesch was disarmed and disbanded on the orders of the Allies in 1921 as part of wider moves against the private armies that had sprouted up in Germany since the armistice. He returned in 1928 by founding a Bavarian Heimatschutz, a name also used by the Styrian Heimwehr of his ally Pfrimer, although this group was less significant due to the growth on the right of militia such as the Sturmabteilung and Der Stahlhelm, and was disbanded in 1933 when Adolf Hitler took power.

== See also ==
- List of Bavarian People's Party politicians
