= Ernst Rüdiger Starhemberg =

Austrian nationalist and politician

Prince Ernst Rüdiger von Starhemberg
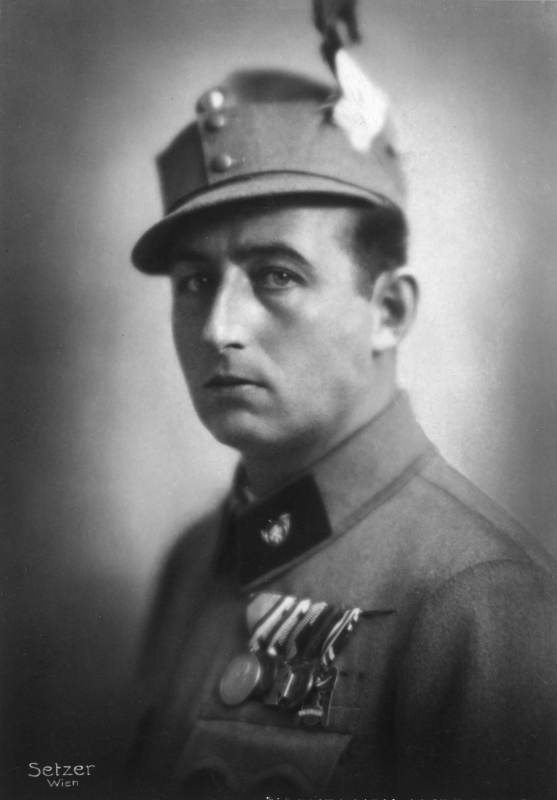
- Ernst Rüdiger Camillo von Starhemberg in Heimwehr uniform

Vice-Chancellor of Austria
- In office 1 May 1934 – 14 May 1936
- Chancellor: Engelbert Dollfuß; Kurt Schuschnigg
- Preceded by: Emil Fey
- Succeeded by: Eduard Baar-Baarenfels

Leader of the Fatherland Front
- In office 31 July 1934 – 15 May 1936
- Preceded by: Engelbert Dollfuß
- Succeeded by: Office abolished

Minister of the Interior
- In office 30 September 1930 – 4 December 1930
- Chancellor: Carl Vaugoin
- Preceded by: Vinzenz Schumy
- Succeeded by: Franz Winkler

Personal details
- Born: 10 May 1899 Eferding, Austro-Hungary
- Died: 15 March 1956 (aged 56) Schruns, Vorarlberg, Austria
- Party: Heimatblock (1921–1933); Fatherland Front (1933–1938)
- Spouses: Countess Marie Elisabeth von Salm-Reifferscheid-Raitz (m. 1928; ann. 1937) Nora Gregor (m. 1937; died 1949)
- Children: 1
- Relatives: Starhemberg family

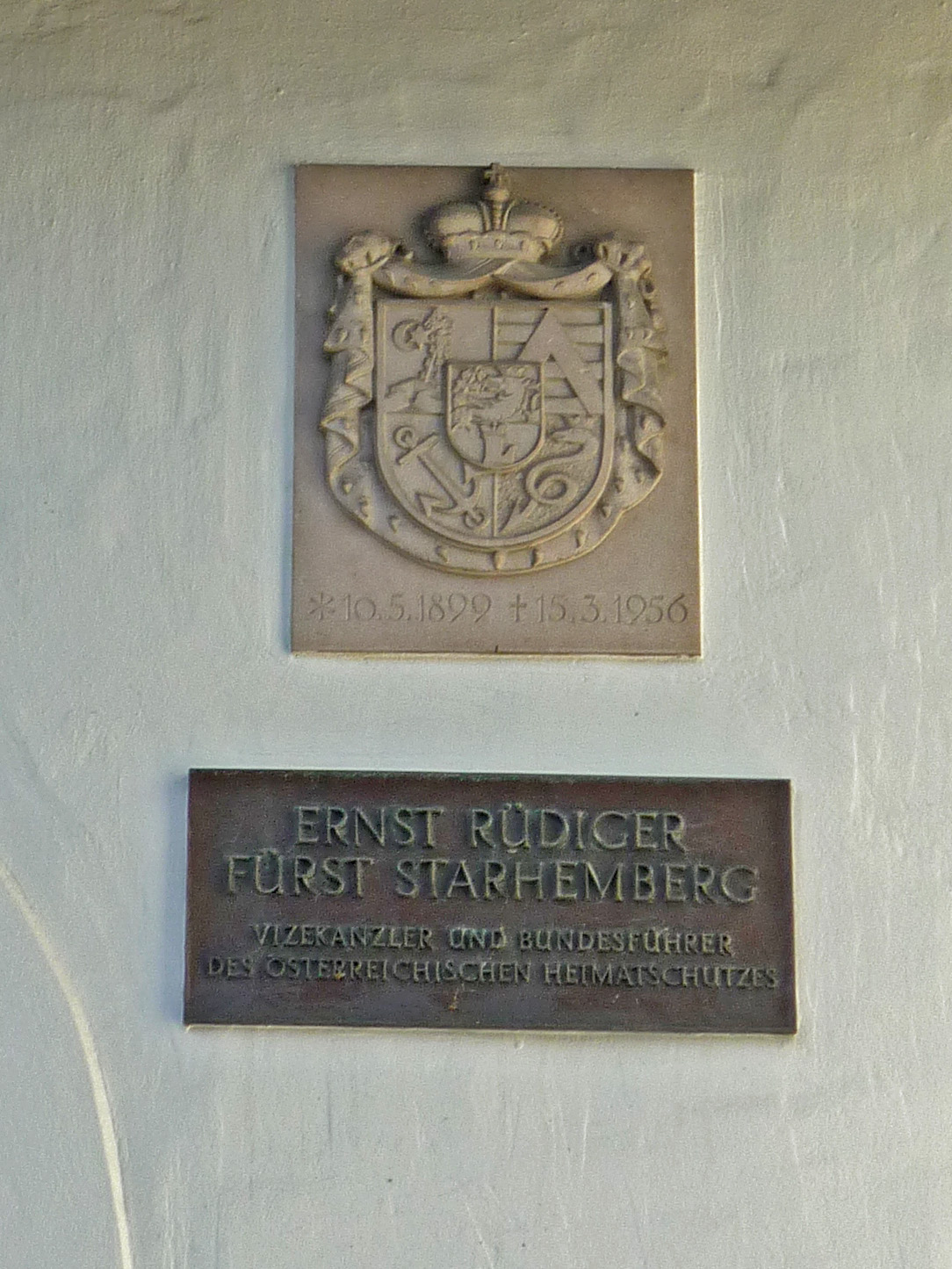
Memorial plaque in Schruns

Prince Ernst Rüdiger Camillo von Starhemberg, often known simply as Prince Starhemberg (10 May 1899 – 15 March 1956), was an Austrian nationalist and politician who helped introduce the dictatorial conservative Ständestaat in Austria during the interwar period. A fierce opponent of Anschluss, he fled Austria when the Nazis invaded the country and briefly served with the Free French and British forces in World War II.

Starhemberg was a leader of the Heimwehr and later of the Fatherland Front. He served in the Bundesrat between 1920 and 1930, as Minister of Interior in 1930, Vice-Chancellor in 1934 and subsequently Acting Chancellor and Leader of the Front after the murder of Engelbert Dollfuß, relinquishing the former position after a few days. Disenchanted by the moderate ways of Chancellor Kurt Schuschnigg, he was ousted from power in 1936, when the Heimwehr was dissolved, and fled the country after the Anschluss to avoid retaliation from vengeful Nazis.

Starhemberg lived in exile in Switzerland and served with the western Allies in the British and Free French Air Forces for a short period at the beginning of World War II, but became disenchanted with them when they entered into an alliance with Joseph Stalin's Soviet Union, which he viewed as equally evil as the Nazis. He left for Argentina where he spent the next thirteen years in exile. He died during an extended visit to Austria in 1956.

He was the 1,163rd Knight of the Order of the Golden Fleece, Austrian Order.

== Biography ==
Born in Eferding, Upper Austria, in 1899, into the illustrious House of Starhemberg which hailed from a long line of Austrian nobles and inherited the title of prince. He was the oldest son of Prince Ernst Rüdiger von Starhemberg and Princess Franziska von Starhemberg, born Countess Larisch von Moennich. He was a collateral relative to Field Marshal Count Ernst Rüdiger von Starhemberg. In World War I he served on the Italian Front and then in 1921 was a member of Freikorps Oberland.

Seeking election to the Bundesrat, the representation of Austrian states (Länder) at age 21, Starhemberg became a proponent of Catholic and conservative politics and joined the Heimatschutz, quickly becoming a leader of one of its local branches. He also became an admirer of Benito Mussolini and his Fascist government. In the early 1920s, Starhemberg traveled to Germany and had contacts with the nascent Nazi movement. Adolf Hitler actively used Starhemberg's status as an Austrian noble to try to improve the party's image and to attract wealthy and influential backers to its ranks. After seeing the failed Beer Hall Putsch of 1923, Starhemberg became disenchanted with Nazism and returned to Austria. Rejoining the Heimatschutz, Starhemberg became its national leader in 1930 and actively campaigned to turn Austria into a more organized state. Eventually, Starhemberg's movement became powerful enough to influence the government, and as such the chancellor appointed him Minister of the Interior in September 1930. Starhemberg resigned his position shortly thereafter, however, when the Heimatblock (the Heimwehr's political wing) only won eight seats in elections for the Nationalrat.

When conservative Engelbert Dollfuß became Chancellor of Austria in 1932, Starhemberg once again gained governmental power. At Dollfuß's request, Starhemberg worked to combine a number of right-wing groups into a single political entity. He was successful, and the result was the powerful Fatherland Front, which saw its creation in late 1933, followed by the authoritarian May Constitution of 1934. For his efforts, Starhemberg became Dollfuß's Vice-Chancellor under the new rule. Upon Dollfuß' assassination two months later during a failed coup by the Nazis, Starhemberg briefly came to head the government and the Front. As President Wilhelm Miklas proclaimed Austria was not yet ready for a "Heimwehr Cabinet", called a cabinet meeting in Vienna's Ballhouse surrounded by barbed wire and government troops to restrain suspicious members of the Heimwehr, who claimed the Nazi coup had been foiled only through their courage, and appointed Kurt von Schuschnigg Chancellor instead on 29 July. Starhemberg officially supported the compromise and his office as Vice-Chancellor, being appointed Minister of Public Security as well.

With these positions, Starhemberg was in effect the second most powerful man in Austria. During this period, the regime fought to keep Austria an independent state by support from France, the United Kingdom and Fascist Italy and through crackdowns on Austrian Nazis and others favoring a union with Germany. The idea of union with Germany had been popular among Socialists as well as Conservatives, although the Treaty of Saint-Germain-en-Laye (1919) which Austria signed at the end of World War I forbade it.

In 1936, Starhemberg's disagreements with Schuschnigg, who, inspired by the appeasement policies of the western democracies, wanted to improve relations with Nazi Germany rather than risk invasion by a far stronger Wehrmacht and face possible desertion by Hitler's new-found ally, Mussolini. In March 1936, Starhemberg was forced to relinquish his position as Federal leader of the Fatherland's Front, which was dissolved (as was the Heimwehr) and on 14 May that year he was ousted from the government.

After the Anschluss in March 1938, which saw much of the Front's leadership purged (Schuschnigg himself was detained and shipped to concentration camp), Starhemberg escaped to Switzerland. In 1940, after the beginning of World War II, Starhemberg joined the French Army and later fled to England during the Dunkirk evacuation. He went on to serve in the British and Free French air forces. However, Starhemberg became disenchanted with the western Allies when they entered into an alliance with Joseph Stalin's Soviet Union, which he viewed as equally evil as the Nazis. In 1942, Starhemberg decided to leave the war and traveled to Argentina where he spent the next thirteen years. In 1955, the year of Juan Perón's (also a fervent admirer of Fascism and Mussolini) ousting by a military coup, Starhemberg returned to Austria.

Starhemberg died in Schruns, Vorarlberg, during an extended visit to Austria in 1956. He was staying at a spa in Schruns. During a walk, he was photographed against his will by Georg Auer, a journalist who worked at a communist newspaper. In response, Starhemberg became enraged and attacked Auer with his walking stick. However, he suddenly suffered a cardiac arrest and died.

== Marriages ==
Starhemberg married two times:

- Marie-Elisabeth Altgräfin zu Salm-Reifferscheidt-Raitz (Donaueschingen, 1 March 1908 – Gmunden, 10 April 1984), married in Vienna on 9 September 1928, annulled on 27 November 1937. She had no children but adopted, in 1973 as her heir, a cousin, Maria Elisabeth (Marielies) Leopoldine Hippolyta, Altgräfin zu Salm-Reifferscheidt-Raitz (born 1931).
- Nora Gregor (Görz, 3 February 1901 – Santiago, 20 January 1949), Austrian-Jewish stage and film actress, married in Vienna on 2 December 1937. They had one child, who was born prior to their marriage, Heinrich Rüdiger Gregor (1934–1997), known from 1937 as Heinrich Rüdiger Karl Georg Franciscus Graf von Starhemberg, later, upon the death of his father, became 8th Fürst von Starhemberg. He died unmarried and without issue so his title was inherited by his cousin Georg Adam (b. 1961) who is the current Prince and Head of the family.

== Notes ==
Political offices
Preceded by Emil Fey	Vice-Chancellor of Austria; 1934–1936	Succeeded by Eduard Baar-Baarenfels
