= Wilhelm Miklas =

President of Austria from 1928 to 1938

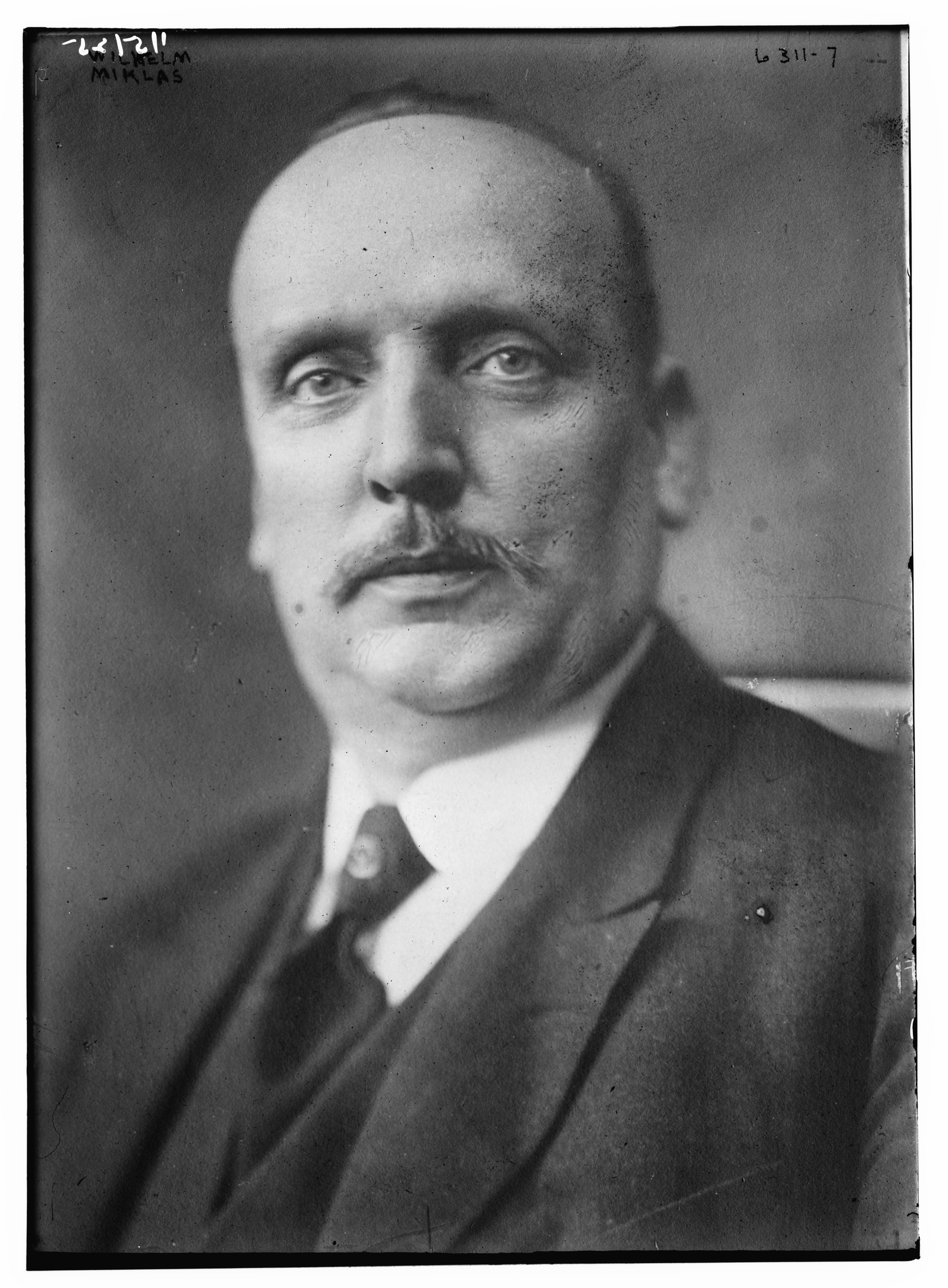

President of Austria
- In office 10 December 1928 – 13 March 1938
- Chancellor: Ignaz Seipel; Ernst Streeruwitz; Johann Schober; Karl Vaugoin; Otto Ender; Karl Buresch; Engelbert Dollfuss; Kurt Schuschnigg; Arthur Seyss-Inquart
- Preceded by: Michael Hainisch
- Succeeded by: Karl Renner (1945)

President of the National Council
- In office 20 November 1923 – 6 December 1928
- Preceded by: Richard Weiskirchner
- Succeeded by: Alfred Gürtler

Personal details
- Born: 15 October 1872 Krems an der Donau, Austria-Hungary
- Died: 20 March 1956 (aged 83) Vienna, Austria
- Party: Fatherland Front (1934–1938); Christian Social Party (1907–1934)
- Spouse: Leopoldine Heidinger (m. 1900)
- Children: 12
- Education: University of Vienna

Wilhelm Miklas (15 October 1872 – 20 March 1956) was an Austrian politician who served as the president of Austria from 1928 until the Anschluss to Nazi Germany in 1938.

== Early life ==
Born as the son of a post official in Krems, in the Cisleithanian crown land of Lower Austria, Miklas graduated from high school at Seitenstetten and went on to study history and geography at the University of Vienna. From 1905 to 1922, Miklas was headmaster of the Federal Secondary School in Horn, a small town in the Lower Austrian Waldviertel region.

== Early political career ==
In 1907, Miklas was elected to the Imperial Council (Reichsrat) parliament as a member of the Christian Social Party. Re-elected in 1911, Miklas held a parliamentary seat in the provisional assembly of German-Austria and in the Constitutional Assembly of the First Austrian Republic. A rare opponent of German nationalism, he declared himself against a closer connection with the Weimar Republic and played a pivotal role in adopting the red-white-red Austrian flag.

In 1919, Miklas was appointed state secretary in the Austrian government of Chancellor Karl Renner. From 1923 to 1928, he was the speaker of the National Council (Nationalrat).

== Presidency ==
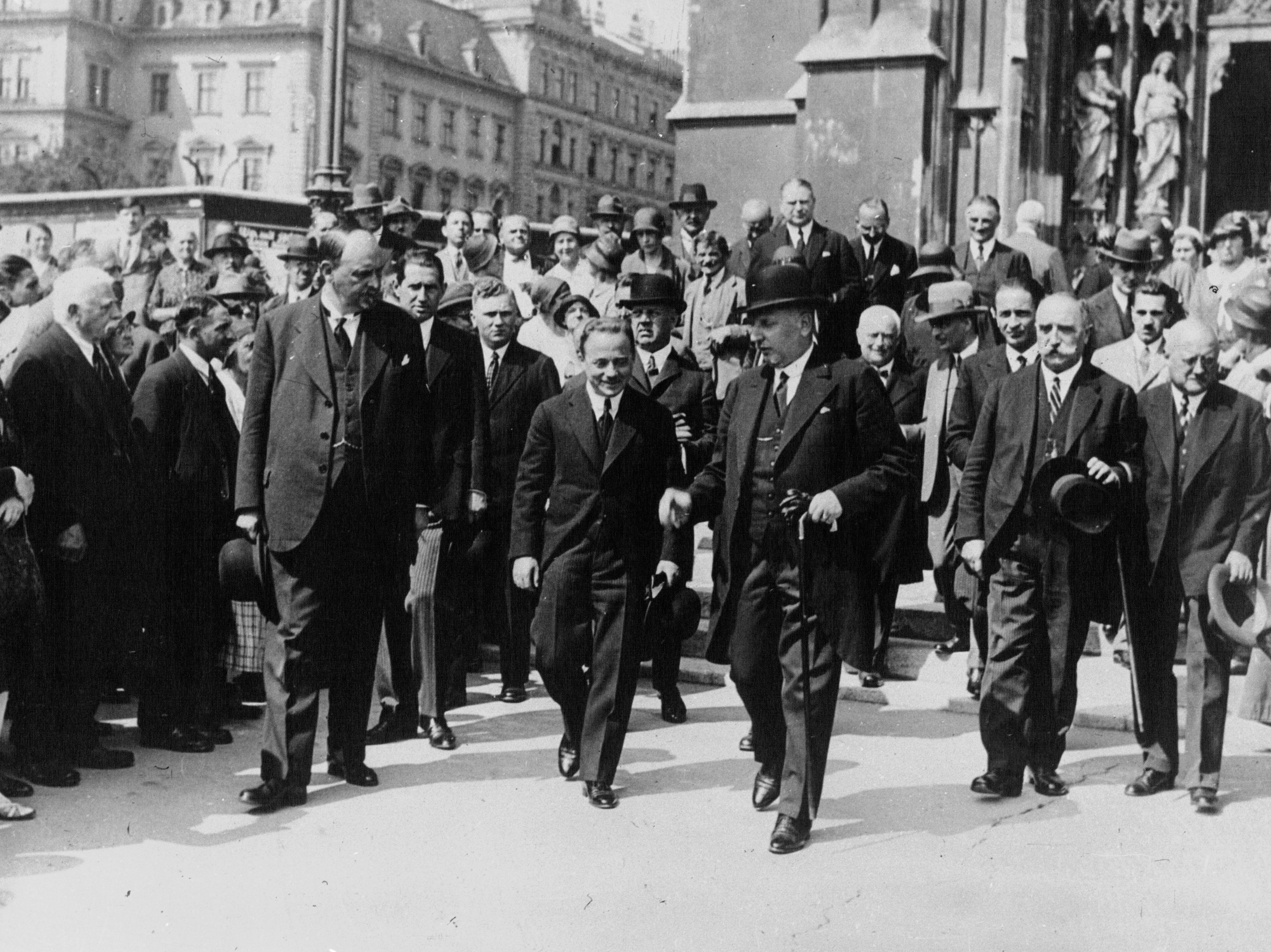
President Miklas (right) and Chancellor Dollfuss (centre), 1932

On 10 December 1928, the representatives of the Federal Assembly elected Miklas President. He served as President until the position ceased to exist just over nine years later.

As President, Miklas was first and foremost a defender of Catholic culture against the anti-clerical Social Democrats. Thus, although he possessed grave doubts as to the action's legitimacy, Miklas did not intervene, when on 4 March 1933 after a heated discussion in the Nationalrat parliament over a strike of federal railways employees Speaker Karl Renner as well as his deputies Rudolf Ramek and Sepp Straffner resigned their offices. The assembly was no longer capable of actions and decisions, which gave Miklas' party fellow, Chancellor Engelbert Dollfuss, the pretext to declare the parliament's "self-elimination". The government obstructed any resumption of the session by the massive presence of police forces as well as of paramilitary Heimwehr troops led by Emil Fey. This self-coup enabled Dollfuss to rule by "emergency decrees" following the Article 48 example set by German President Paul von Hindenburg.

Miklas again remained passive on 20 May, when the government established the Fatherland Front as a prospective single-party, followed by the ban of the Communist Party, the Austrian branch of the Nazi Party and the Social Democratic Republikanischer Schutzbund paramilitary organisation. The prohibition of the Arbeiter-Zeitung (Worker's Newspaper) and the measures against the Austrian labour movement led to the outbreak of the Austrian Civil War on 12 February 1934. As a result, the Social Democratic Party was also banned and Dollfuss' ideology was finally realized with the implementation of the Federal State of Austria (Ständestaat). The authoritarian measures had no effect on the office of the President. In his private records, Miklas clearly condemned the violation of the constitution by Dollfuss and his successor Kurt Schuschnigg, but he did not openly criticise the government's policies.

During the July Putsch of 1934, Nazi putschists tried to arrest the Federal President on his way to Velden in Carinthia and take him hostage. The Nazis chased President Miklas' vehicle for some time, but after the failure of the coup in Vienna they were stopped and arrested by the Austrian police.

Miklas became highly unpopular among Austrian Nazis when he refused to commute the death sentences imposed on assassins of Dollfuss after the failed July Putsch in 1934. In view of the rising pressure by Nazi Germany, Austria approached the Kingdom of Italy under Duce Benito Mussolini and the Kingdom of Hungary. In 1936, Miklas entertained Regent Miklós Horthy at Wörthersee.

After Schuschnigg had been summoned to the Berghof by Adolf Hitler to receive German demands on 12 February 1938, Miklas offered amnesty to the jailed Nazi members but initially refused to turn over the national police force to their leader Arthur Seyss-Inquart. However, when Hitler ordered Wehrmacht operations along the border, the president was forced to give in and installed Seyss-Inquart as Austrian Minister of the Interior.

On 9 March 1938, Schuschnigg announced a plebiscite on Austrian independence to be held within four days. In turn, on 11 March, Hermann Göring demanded that Seyss-Inquart replace Schuschnigg as chancellor; otherwise, German forces would overrun Austria the following day. While a Nazi mob invaded the chancellery, Schuschnigg declared his resignation ("yielding to force"). Miklas again refused to appoint Seyss-Inquart but was not able to present a non-Nazi candidate. After Hitler received the confirmation from Mussolini that Italy would not interfere, he gave orders that German troops would invade at dawn the following day (Unternehmen Otto). Miklas capitulated at midnight, announcing that he had appointed Seyss-Inquart as the new chancellor. Seyss-Inquart hectically spoke on the phone with the Nazi authorities in Berlin, but it was too late. When German troops rolled over the border at dawn the next day, they met with no resistance from the Austrian Armed Forces and were largely greeted as heroes.

Miklas, for his initial refusal, ended up under house arrest but was protected from mistreatment by the future Waffen-SS Colonel Otto Skorzeny during the days of the Anschluss. With the promulgation of a "law concerning the re-unification of Austria with the German Reich" by Seyss-Inquart on 13 March, the offices of both the Austrian chancellor and of the Austrian president were terminated. While Schuschnigg was imprisoned, Miklas abandoned the political sphere and retired, receiving his pension unmolested.

== After World War II ==
After World War II, Miklas refused to run again for the presidency in favour of Karl Renner. He died on 20 March 1956 in Vienna.

Political offices
| Preceded by Michael Hainisch | State President of Austria; 1928–1938 | Vacant Annexation by Germany Title next held by Karl Renner |
