= Walter Pfrimer =

Austrian politician (1881–1968)

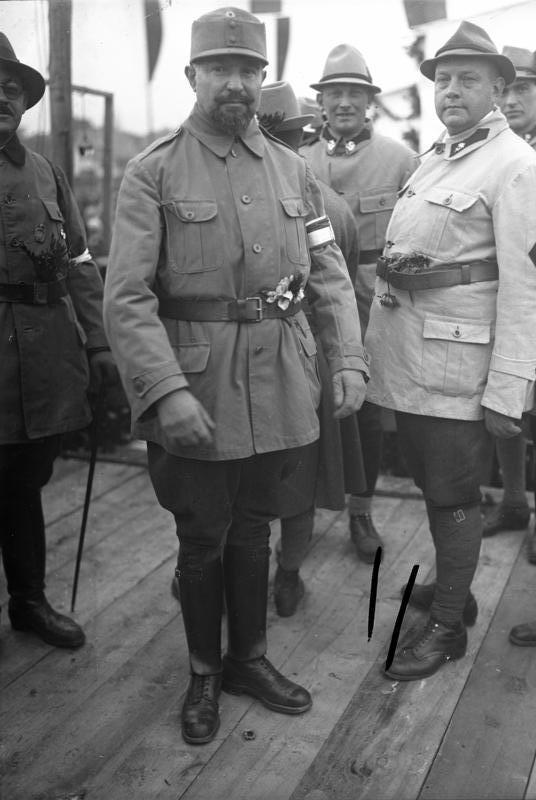
- Pfrimer (right) with Heimwehr leader Richard Steidle, c. 1930
- Born: Walter Pfrimer; 22 December 1881; Maribor, Austria-Hungary
- Died: 31 May 1968 (aged 86); Judenburg, Austria
- Citizenship: Austrian, German (1938–1945)
- Education: Doctor of Law
- Alma mater: University of Graz
- Occupation: Lawyer
- Known for: Heimwehr leader
- Political party: Nazi Party

Walter Pfrimer (22 December 1881 – 31 May 1968) was an Austrian lawyer, a nationalist politician and leader of the paramilitary Heimwehr in Styria. He was the leader of a failed putsch in 1931 and, though charged with treason, he was acquitted. His movement lost influence to the Nazi Party and he became an advocate for union with Germany. After the Anschluss took place, he sat as a deputy in the Reichstag from 1938 until May 1945. Interned for a year after the end of the Second World War, he was released and returned to private legal practice.

== Early years ==
The son of a wine merchant, Pfrimer studied law at the University of Graz, gaining his doctor of law degree in 1906. As a student, he had been a member of the Burschenschaft and an ardent follower of the German nationalist and antisemitic hard-liner Georg Ritter von Schönerer before settling into a position as a lawyer in Judenburg.

Pfrimer became a leader of the Heimwehr (Home Guard), a nationalist paramilitary group, early in the movement's life and initially won the financial backing of the Alpine Montangesellschaft, the largest heavy industry concern in Austria. His Heimwehr unit was amongst the best armed, having received weapons from both Bavarian Georg Escherich rightist paramilitary leader and the local Landeshauptmann Anton Rintelen.

== Political views ==
Pfrimer advocated Pan-German and Völkische ideals and used the swastika for his Heimwehr units. Like his sometime ally Richard Steidle in Tyrol, he unashamedly endorsed fascism for the Heimwehr, unlike other units that were close to the more ideologically pragmatic Christian Social Party, and in 1930 publicly advocated the overthrow of the Austrian government and the establishment of a fascist regime. The two fell out however after Pfrimer, who argued that Jews must be treated as a foreign race, suggested that Steidle was too weak on the issue. Pfrimer took up with Ernst Rüdiger Starhemberg and helped to ensure that the nobleman replaced Steidle as Heimwehr leader in 1930. He was also a staunch opponent of socialism, often leading his men in violent attacks on the Social Democratic Party of Austria, whilst rejecting parliamentary democracy as un-German.

== Putsch of 1931 ==
As head of the Heimwehr in Styria he attempted a putsch in September 1931, initially in his own region. After rising up in Styria, his units launched a marcia su Wien in a direct copy of Benito Mussolini's March on Rome but it proved to be a disaster and Pfrimer became mockingly known as the "half-day dictator" in reference to how long it took to put his attempted rebellion down. He failed to gain support from the other regional leaders and the coup was so poorly organised that it was easily put down by the otherwise weak government of Karl Buresch.

== Aftermath ==
Pfrimer was damaged irreparably by the fiasco of the failed putsch. It also represented a further blow to the credibility of the Heimwehr, which lost more members to the Nazi Party as a consequence. He fled to Yugoslavia before returning to face a treason trial but, in a surprise move, he was acquitted of all charges.

Finally in 1933, Pfrimer allied himself and his units to the Nazis and before long his group had been absorbed entirely and he became a strong advocate of Anschluss. His membership of the Nazi Party was made official on 24 February 1933. When the Anschluss for which he had longed was completed in March 1938, he returned to some prominence. At the 10 April 1938 parliamentary election, he was elected to the Reichstag as a deputy from Ostmark and retained this seat until the fall of the Nazi regime in 1945.

== Post-war life ==
After the Allies liberated Austria, Pfrimer was taken prisoner by the British forces and held in internment for a year. Following his release, he returned to his legal practice in Judenburg and lived out his days as a private citizen.
