= Karl Buresch =

Chancellor of Austria from 1931 to 1932

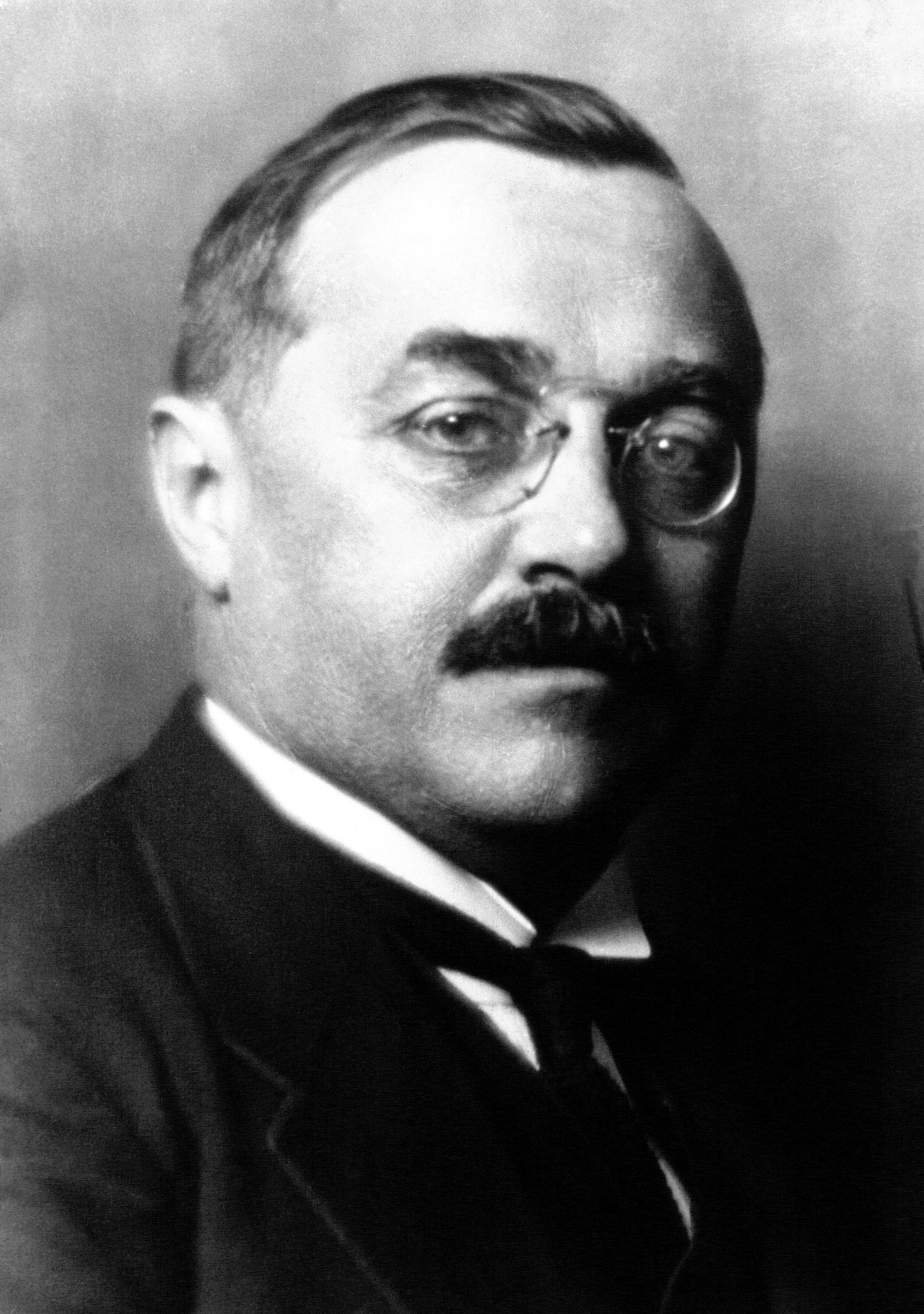
- Chancellor Buresch in 1932

Chancellor of Austria
- In office 20 June 1931 – 20 May 1932
- President: Wilhelm Miklas
- Vice-Chancellor: Johann Schober; Franz Winkler
- Preceded by: Otto Ender
- Succeeded by: Engelbert Dollfuß
Other offices held
Minister of Finance
In office 16 May 1933 – 17 October 1935
Preceded by	Emanuel Weidenhoffer
Succeeded by	Ludwig Draxler
Governor of Lower Austria
In office 19 May 1932 – 18 May 1933
Preceded by	Josef Reither
Succeeded by	Josef Reither
In office 9 June 1922 – 31 July 1931
Preceded by	Johann Mayer
Succeeded by	Josef Reither
Minister of Foreign Affairs
In office 29 January 1932 – 20 May 1932
Preceded by	Johann Schober
Succeeded by	Engelbert Dollfuß

Personal details
- Born: 12 October 1878 Groß-Enzersdorf, Lower Austria, Austria-Hungary
- Died: 16 September 1936 (aged 57) Vienna, Federal State of Austria
- Party: Christian Social Party

Karl Buresch (12 October 1878 – 16 September 1936) was a lawyer, Christian-Social politician and Chancellor of Austria during the First Austrian Republic.

== Life ==
Buresch was born the son of a merchant in Groß-Enzersdorf, Lower Austria, where he attended primary school (Volksschule). After finishing secondary school in Döbling, he studied law at the University of Vienna, receiving his degree in 1901. Buresch worked for a firm of solicitors in his home town, became a Christian Social member of the Groß-Enzersdorf council in 1909 and in 1916 the town's mayor, a position he held until 1919. In 1919 he was an elected member of the Austrian Constitutional Assembly (in German Mitglied der Konstituierenden Nationalversammlung). During the 1920s and early 1930s he was a delegate to the National Council parliament (1920–1934), Landeshauptmann governor of Lower Austria (1922–1931 and again 1932–1933), and a chairman of the Christian-Social group.

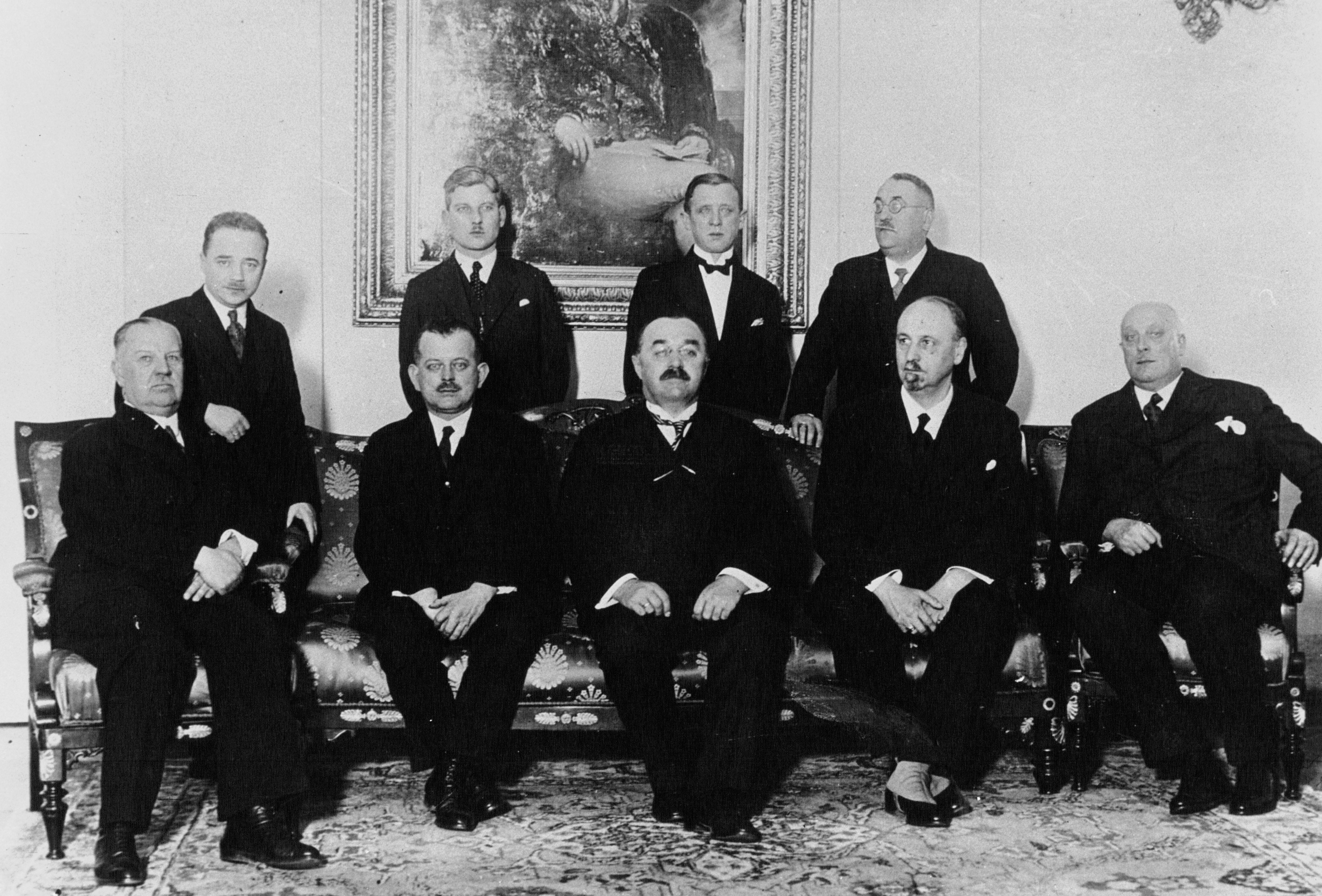
Second Buresch cabinet, 1932

Upon the collapse of the biggest Austrian bank Creditanstalt in May 1931, difficulties created by the Great Depression and the instability of the national currency, the First Republic found itself in political turmoil. On 20 June 1931 Buresch was appointed Chancellor of Austria and finally managed to form a cabinet of Christian Social and German nationalist politicians, after unsuccessful attempts by his predecessors Otto Ender and Ignaz Seipel to cope with the crisis. As the commercial crisis continued and domestic policies deteriorated after a failed Heimwehr putsch led by Walter Pfrimer, Buresch lost his German nationalist allies and went on to govern with a minority cabinet from January 1932. During his mandate, which lasted to 20 May 1932, a number of austerity measures were introduced. His government was succeeded by a cabinet formed by Engelbert Dollfuß.

Buresch again assumed the office of Lower Austrian governor, before on 16 May 1933 he joined the Dollfuß cabinet as Minister of Finance. On 17 October 1935 he was succeeded by Ludwig Draxler. Until his sudden death in 1936, Buresch served as governor of the Österreichische Postsparkasse (postal savings bank) in Vienna.

Political offices
Preceded by Otto Ender	Chancellor of Austria; 1931–1932	Succeeded by Engelbert Dollfuß
