= Heimwehr =

Far-right interwar Austrian paramilitary group

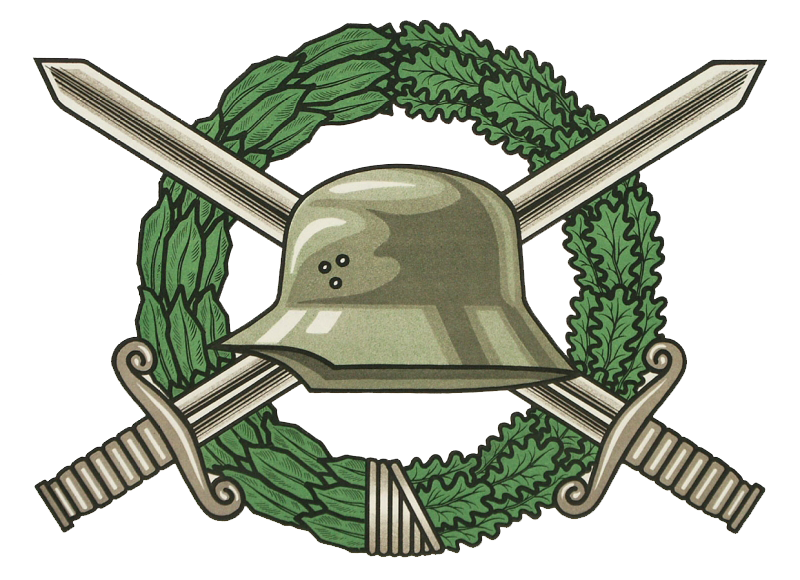
- Merged into: Fatherland Front
- Formation: May 1920; 106 years ago
- Founder: Richard Steidle
- Dissolved: October 1936; 89 years ago
- Type: Paramilitary
- Origins: Aftermath of World War I: Austro-Slovene conflict in Carinthia; July Putsch
- Region served: First Austrian Republic
- Members: 400,000 (1929 est.)
- Key people: Walter Pfrimer; Waldemar Pabst
- Affiliations: Austrian Federal Government

Homeland Bloc Heimatblock
- Founded: May 1930; 96 years ago
- Dissolved: 27 September 1933; 92 years ago
- Ideology: Austrian nationalism Anti-communism; Corporate statism Program: Korneuburg Oath
- Political position: Right-wing to far-right
- National Council (1930): 8 / 165 (5%)

The Heimwehr (German: [ˈhaɪmˌveːɐ̯], lit. 'Home Guard') or Heimatschutz (German: [ˈhaɪmatˌʃʊts], lit. 'Homeland Protection') was a clerico-fascist, nationalist, initially paramilitary, group that operated in the First Austrian Republic from 1920 to 1936. It was similar in methods, organization, and ideology to the Freikorps in Germany. The Heimwehr was opposed to parliamentary democracy, socialism and Marxism and fought in various skirmishes against left-wing and foreign groups during the 1920s and 1930s. Some of its regional groups also opposed Nazism while others favored it. In spite of its anti-democratic stance, the Heimwehr developed a political wing called the Heimatblock ('Homeland Bloc') that was close to the conservative Christian Social Party and took part in both the cabinet of Chancellor Carl Vaugoin in 1930 and in Engelbert Dollfuss' right-wing government from 1932 to 1934. In 1936 the Heimwehr was absorbed into what was at the time the only legally permitted political party in Austria, the Fatherland Front, and then later into the Frontmiliz, an amalgamation of militia units that in 1937 became part of Austria's armed forces.

== Origins ==
After the end of World War I and the dissolution of the Austro-Hungarian Empire, local residents' militias and self-defense associations formed mainly from demobilized soldiers sprang up across Austria. Their purpose initially was to protect the local population from dangers such as those posed by soldiers trying to make their way to their home countries who, driven by hunger and largely without leadership, sometimes looted and assaulted the population in the areas they passed through. Such local self-defense associations over time formed individual Heimwehr units.

Beginning in April 1919, the Vorarlberg provincial government approved and promoted active paramilitary people's militias to combat Austromarxism, either equipping the militia members with weapons or allowing them to use their own. They were led by the Christian Socialist provincial governor Otto Ender and financed primarily by local industry. In the summer of 1920 they had about 3,000 members, whereas the Austrian army in the province had only 800 soldiers under arms. The Vorarlberg Heimwehr subsequently emerged from the militia groups.

The first association of the Heimatwehr ('Homeland Guard'), as the Heimwehr was called in Tyrol, was founded on 12 May 1920 by Richard Steidle, a member of the Tyrolean parliament from the Christian Social Party who was the regional leader of the Heimatwehr in Tyrol until 1936. His deputies either supported or held parliamentary seats with the Greater German People's Party (Großdeutsche Volkspartei), an Austrian political party calling for unification with Germany. The group's statutes listed four program points:

- protection of the constitution and defense against any attempt to change the constitution by force
- protection of persons, employment and property
- support of the existing state authority in maintaining peace and order
- intervention in the case of fundamentally important events

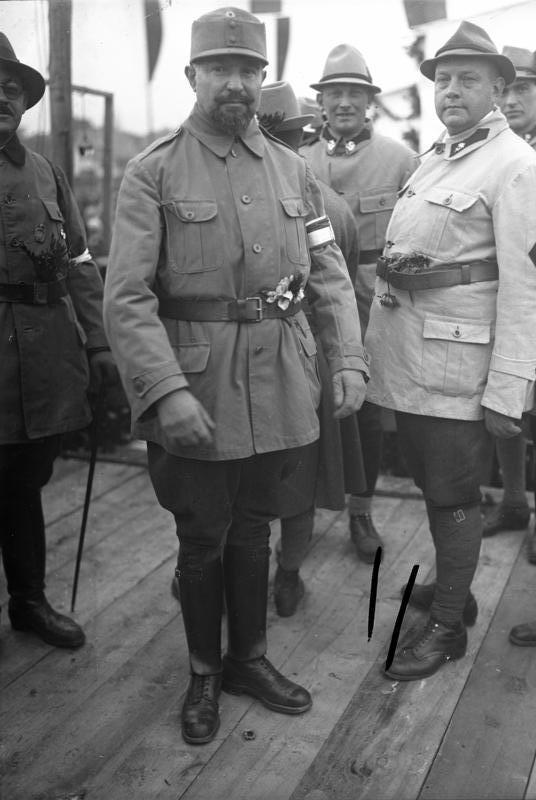
Richard Steidle (with beard)

Their program also emphasized the "exclusion of all party politics" and stated that as a private association, it was "not concerned with military matters". The Heimatwehr was thus not a party organization but an independent, politically right-wing paramilitary unit. It saw its political enemy in the Social Democratic Workers' Party of Austria, or SDAP (the name that was used by the Social Democratic Party of Austria before 1945).

The Heimwehr was involved early on in border disputes with troops from the Kingdom of Hungary and the Kingdom of Yugoslavia. When it turned its opposition primarily against Austromarxism, from which it wished to protect the middle class, the Social Democrats in response formed the Republikanischer Schutzbund ('Republican Protection League') in 1923 as a defensive counterweight to the Heimwehr.

The Heimwehr registered significant gains after the SDAP published its militant Linz Program in November 1926. Because it used the language of Marxism and class conflict to provide the theoretical basis for political confrontation with the Christian Social Party and the Heimwehr, it caused many in the middle class, including some who were merely not socialist minded, to fear a domestic political turn toward a dictatorship of the proletariat.

== Years of rapid growth 1927–1930 ==
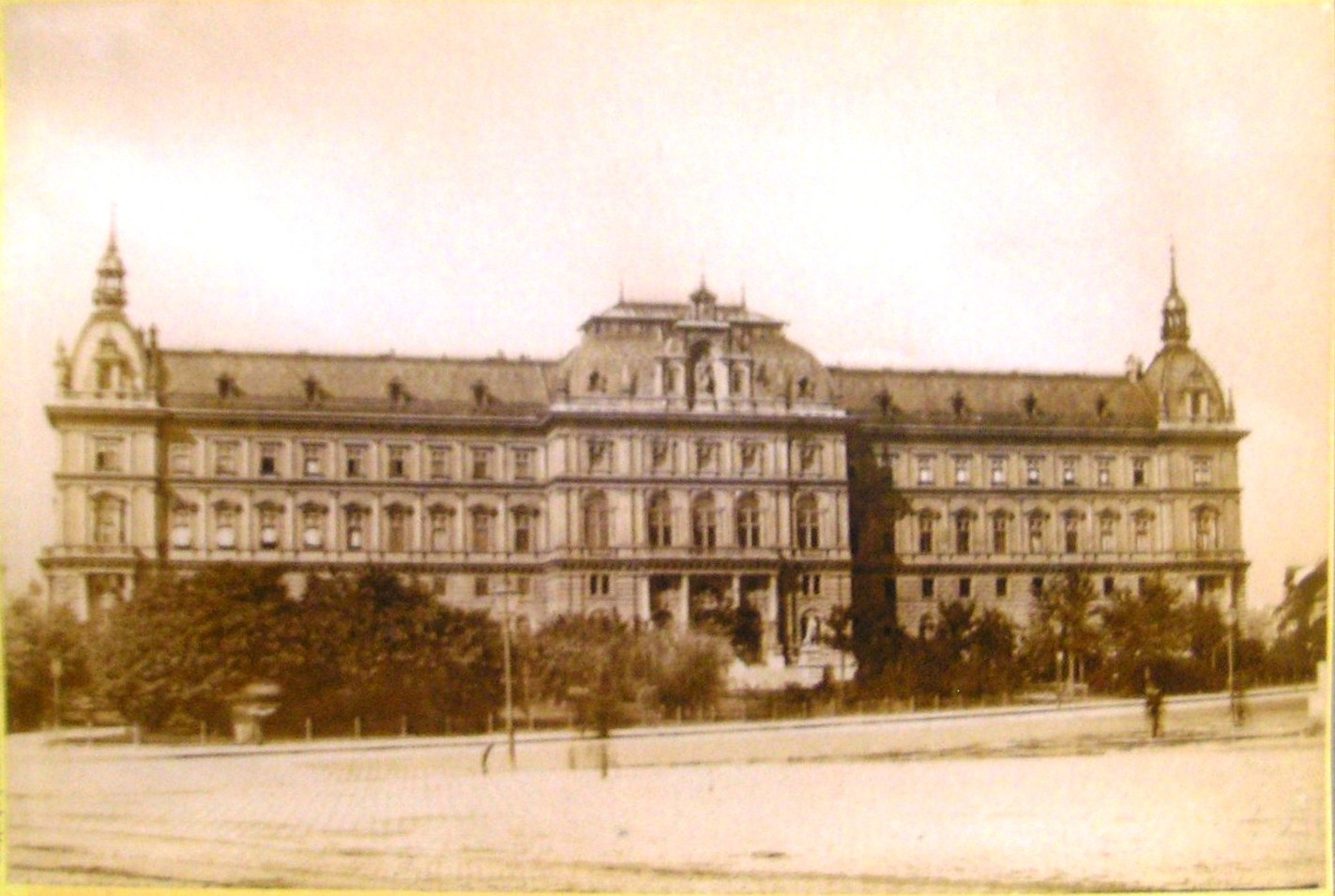
The Vienna Palace of Justice

On 30 January 1927 members of the SDAP who were holding a meeting at Schattendorf in Burgenland were fired on by a group from the right-wing Front Fighters Association of German Austria (Frontkämpfer), leaving two dead and five wounded. When the men who had been accused of the deaths were acquitted by a jury, protestors in what came to be known as the July Revolt of 1927 burned the Vienna Palace of Justice. More than 80 demonstrators died in the subsequent clashes with the police, leading the Social Democrats to speak of it as the "July Massacre" of workers. When they engaged in transportation strikes, the Heimwehr stepped in to break them, especially in areas outside Vienna.

In the years from 1927 to 1930, the Heimwehr movement experienced a period of rapid growth and became a significant part in the increasingly radicalized domestic political situation. It aspired to be more than what Richard Steidle called a watchdog let off its leash when needed by the middle-class parties. Many Heimwehr leaders began to develop a more political profile and demanded a fundamental change in Austria's political system that would move it towards authoritarianism and corporatism – that is, a society similar to the type favoured by Italian fascism that was organized around corporate groups such as agriculture, manual labour, the military, business, trade and the like. In 1927 the various provincial Heimwehr associations joined to form an umbrella organization, the Federation of Austrian Self-Defense Associations. The Heimwehr's leaders attempted to implement the political change they wanted both through ongoing agitation in the streets – mainly in the form of massive Sunday marches – and behind the scenes through political pressure on the federal government. A large march on 7 October 1928 in Wiener Neustadt, an industrial area of Vienna that was a stronghold of the SDAP, was a self-confident demonstration of strength. Many in the middle class cheered the Heimwehr as a "saviour in the time of need".

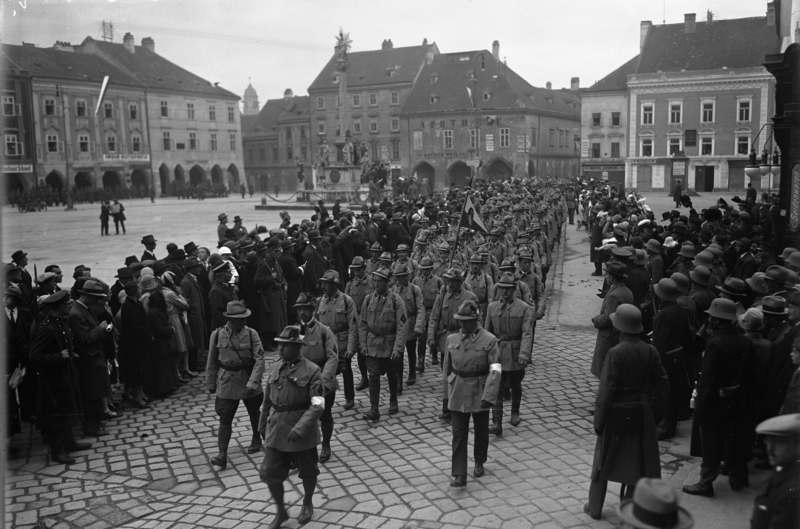
Heimwehr march in Wiener Neustadt, 1928

The Heimwehr was supported financially, logistically, and with arms by industry and large landowners, especially from Styria, as well as by Italian fascists, the Hungarian regime of Miklós Horthy and groups on the Bavarian right (e.g. the Organization Chancellor). Numerous World War I front-line officers served as military "advisors" and functionaries. Ernst Rüdiger Starhemberg, who became the Heimwehr's national leader in 1930, approached right-wing circles in Great Britain, including the fascist politician Oswald Mosley, from whom he was able to receive no financial support. Konstantin Kammerhofer, leader of the Styrian Heimwehr, received money from the German Reich government until mid-1932. When the Italian fascist dictator Benito Mussolini came to believe that the Heimwehr would not achieve its goal of making Austria a corporate state, he stopped his financial contributions in October 1933.

== Inability to unify ==
In 1929, the government of Chancellor Ernst Streeruwitz, a coalition of the Christian Social Party, Greater German People's Party and the agrarian Landbund, engaged the Heimwehr in negotiations regarding constitutional reform. They and the Social Democrats were close to a compromise when in late September, the Heimwehr and Christian Social Party brought down the government. Ignaz Seipel, leader of the Christian Socialists, chose to install the independent Johannes Schober as chancellor. Schober, who had been Vienna's police chief during the 1927 July Revolt and had approved firing on the demonstrators, was seen by the Heimwehr as strong and a beacon of hope. He proved, however, to be a bitter disappointment to them. In the dispute over the 1929 amendment to the Austrian constitution that strengthened the position of the federal president, he worked out a compromise with the Social Democrats that was completely unacceptable to the Heimwehr, and in addition he was unwilling to give in to their other demands. It represented a significant setback for the movement, which until then had seen itself moving in a steadily upward arc.

The Heimwehr's failure in the constitutional dispute and the onset of the world economic crisis in Austria in the early 1930s ushered in a period of stagnation and increasing drifting apart within the Heimwehr movement. Its national leader Richard Steidle hoped to overcome the problems in May 1930 with the so-called Korneuburg Oath, which he read out at a general assembly of the Lower Austrian Heimatschutz. It included statements that supported authoritarian conservative ideals such as "We want to seize power … and bring a new order to the state and the economy" and "We reject Western democratic parliamentarianism and the party-state!". The oath established Austrian conservative nationalism – as distinct from the pan-German nationalism of the Nazi Party – as a basic part of its ideology.

Such attempts to unite the Heimwehr under an integrated leadership failed in the long run due to the differing objectives of the individual Heimwehr associations and the rivalries of their various leaders. The Styrian and Carinthian Heimwehr in particular rejected the Christian, corporatist course of the federal leadership and moved increasingly close to the Nazis. They were also openly anti-Semitic, calling for a boycott of Jewish businesses and banning Jews as members after 1933. The attitude of the rest of the Heimwehr was less definite. Although anti-Semitism was brought into play as a political weapon, as it was against refugees from eastern Europe and the allegedly "Jewish" social democracy, its use was more opportunistic than ideological and did not play a dominant role as an integrative element of the movement.

== Heimatblock ==
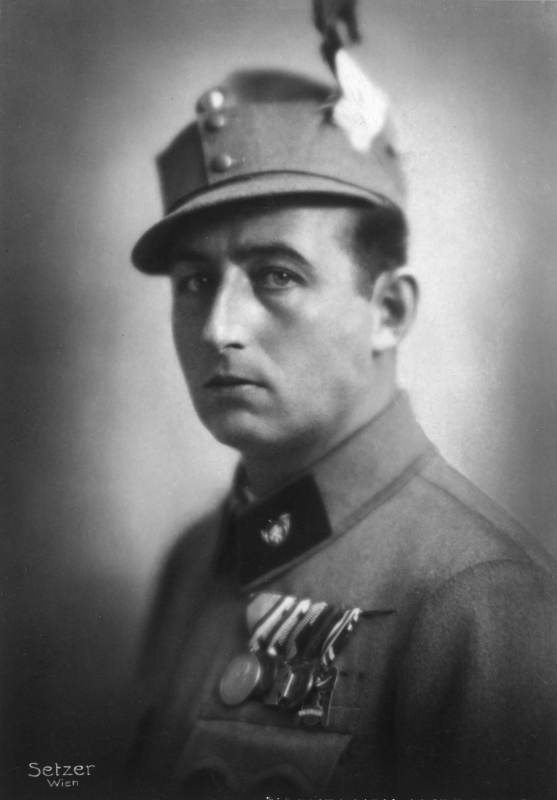
Ernst Rüdiger Starhemberg in Heimwehr uniform

After Schober's resignation on 25 September 1930, the new Christian Socialist Chancellor Carl Vaugoin offered the Heimwehr a share in his minority cabinet. Although the national leadership of the Heimwehr at first rejected the offer, it was forced to agree under pressure from provincial functionaries. On 1 October 1930, Ernst Rüdiger Starhemberg, the Heimwehr's newly elected national leader, became Minister of the Interior and Franz Hueber Minister of Justice in Vaugoin's cabinet. Vaugoin hoped that this would lead to an alliance with the Heimwehr in the next election.

The Heimwehr's national leadership contemplated the electoral alliance and one with the Greater German People's Party, the Landbund and the Austrian National Socialists. There was considerable disagreement over questions of ideology and political strategy. Starhemberg advocated a separate Heimwehr list for the 1930 National Council election, while the Styrian Heimwehr rejected the idea. Walter Pfrimer, leader of the Heimwehr in Styria, was fundamentally opposed to participating in the election, while his chief of staff, Rauter, pursued the idea of an electoral alliance with the National Socialists. Rauter met with the German Nazi Party's organizational leader, Gregor Strasser, to discuss cooperation in early October 1930. Because there were not enough supporters for such an alliance in the movement, they drew up their own electoral list, the Heimatblock.

=== 1930 election ===
Since the National Council elections were scheduled for 9 November 1930, there was very little time for preparation. The election campaign was characterized by considerable confusion. The Viennese, Lower Austrian, and Burgenland provincial associations preferred to stand in combination with the Christian Socialists, while the Vorarlberg provincial association abstained from any political participation in accordance with its statutes. Some Heimwehr newspapers had to advertise for two lists. In a very short time, the Heimatblock, with generous financial support from the fascist Italian dictator Benito Mussolini, had to improvise the management for the election campaign, develop a party program and schedule election events. Their unexpected participation in the party process, which had previously been so extensively criticized, also had to be explained to members and made palatable to them.

The Heimatblock received 6.2% of the total vote and 8 seats. Entry into the National Council was made possible by the achievement of a 'basic mandate' in Upper Styria – that is, they attained a sufficient minimum percent of the votes in a region to qualify for entry into parliament. In the provincial elections in Styria, which took place at the same time, the Heimatblock won 12.5% of the votes and 6 seats. In national politics, the election results achieved the opposite of what had been wanted. The Heimatblock cost the Christian Socialists votes and thus played into the hands of the Social Democrats, who won the largest number of votes. The new federal government was nevertheless built by the Christian Socialist Otto Ender as a coalition of middle-class parties. Members of the Heimatblock took their seats in the National Council on the opposition bench, on the far right and in Heimwehr uniform.

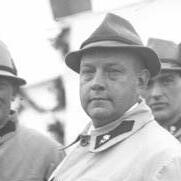
Walter Pfrimer

The election results further weakened the internal cohesion of the Heimwehr. Starhemberg eventually made way for Walter Pfrimer as the new national leader. He represented a radical course within the Heimwehr and had already used violence several times in Styria to push through political demands. Pfrimer saw that all previous attempts to bring about the desired change in the political system had failed, that the Heimwehr was continuing to break apart and that it was coming under increasing pressure from the growing strength of the Austrian National Socialists. As a result, he decided to risk everything in a coup d'état which was to finally implement the Heimwehr's demands and thus solve all the group's problems with one blow. Pfrimer's coup attempt in September 1931 failed completely and ultimately led to the Heimwehr movement splitting into a pro-government wing around Steidle and Starhemberg and an anti-government wing around Konstantin Kammerhofer, the leader of the Styrian Heimwehr, which made up the largest segment within the movement.

Martial speeches nevertheless continued to be made at voter meetings and in newspapers. The election appeal in the newspaper of the Heimatschutz stated that the Heimatblock had to "conquer parliament ... in order to build the new state, the Heimatwehr state, on the ruins of the party-political parliament." In Linz, the Heimwehr functionary Karl Gallian called the Heimatblock "the political machine gun of the Heimatwehr movement". In the National Council, however, internal disputes and squabbles weakened the Block's opposition activities. It was known more for noise and fisticuffs than for political work.

=== In the Dollfuss government ===
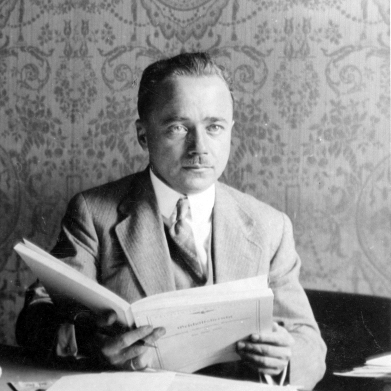
Engelbert Dollfuss

When the Christian Socialist government of Karl Buresch had to resign on 6 May 1932, new elections appeared to be necessary. Since the Nazi Party had already made large gains in the regional elections earlier in the year, the Christian Socialists tried to avoid holding one. The Social Democrats and the Greater Germans rejected coalition offers, which left only the Heimatblock and the Landbund to enable Engelbert Dollfuss, then still of the Christian Social Party, to form a government with a majority of just one seat. In the coalition negotiations, the Heimatblock had demanded that Anton Rintelen, the Christian Social governor of Styria and an outspoken friend of the Heimwehr, become chancellor but in the end had to be satisfied with him becoming Minister of Education. Guido Jakoncig, a member of the Heimatblock ranks, became Minister for Trade and Transport.

The Heimwehr's involvement in the new government had little support from its rank and file. The provincial leadership of the Styrian Heimwehr even declared its "state of political independence" on 19 May. The Heimatblock was not easy to work with inside the coalition, where it repeatedly objected to proposals made by Chancellor Dollfuss. A motion of no confidence by the Greater German People's Party was supported by two Heimatblock deputies and was defeated by 81 votes to 81. The narrow majority made it difficult for the government to pass legislation. A deputy who was out sick, or the voting behaviour of individual Heimatblock members that deviated from the party line, could determine success or defeat in the National Council.

Before the parliamentary summer recess on 19 August 1932, the Social Democratic Arbeiter-Zeitung (Workers' Newspaper) wrote: "But in October when Parliament reconvenes, either it will have to be dissolved or another government formed. This governing which depends daily on the respective whims of Mr. Werner or Mr. Hainzl is impossible, untenable, intolerable."

On 16 October, during a march by National Socialists in Vienna, gunfire broke out between members of the SDAP's Republican Protection League, Communists, Nazis and the police. Four people died and many more were wounded. In response, the government the next day created the new position of State Secretary for Security and filled it with the leader of the Vienna Heimatschutz, Emil Fey. He immediately arranged for a ban on marches in Vienna by the political movements involved in the violence.

Dollfuss' authoritarian course pleased the Heimwehr, and on 5 November 1932, the Österreichische Heimatschutzzeitung (Austrian Heimatschutz Newspaper) ran the headline: "Commitment to fascism!" and on 25 February 1933: "Away with Parliament!" Seven days later, the wish was fulfilled. With the so-called "Self-elimination of the Austrian Parliament" of 4 March 1933, the way was paved for the dictatorship of Dollfuß and Schuschnigg. On 24 March, Fey imposed preliminary censorship on the Social Democratic party newspapers Arbeiter-Zeitung and Das Kleine Blatt, and on 31 March the Republican Protection League was dissolved. The traditional May Day march was also banned.

On 10 May, Fey was appointed Minister of Security, and the Heimwehr ideologue Odo Neustädter-Stürmer was appointed State Secretary for Labor Procurement, Labor Service, Roads and Tourism. On 20 May the Fatherland Front was founded, in large part at Starhemberg's suggestion. It absorbed Christian Social Party, the Landbund and the Heimwehr and was conceived as a rallying organization in which all political movements except Austromarxism and National Socialism were to be represented. Since the hoped-for movement of the Fatherland Front towards fascism did not proceed to the extent hoped for by much of the Heimwehr, relations with the movement remained contradictory and distrustful. On 19 June 1933, Dollfuss banned the Styrian Heimatschutz alongside the Austrian Nazi Party.

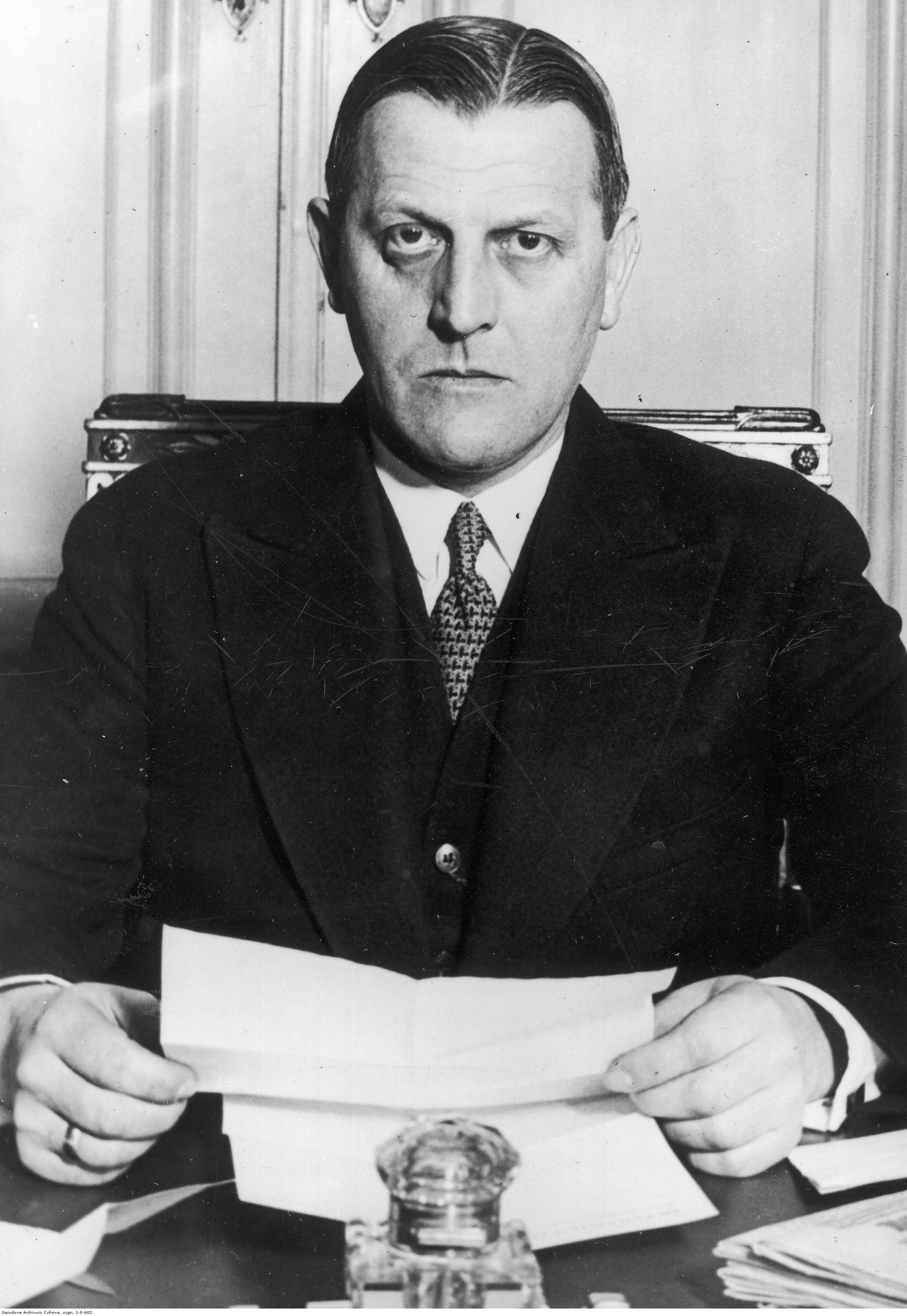
Emil Fey

On 11 September 1933, Dollfuss announced the end of the party-state and introduced plans to institute a corporatist order and to change the constitution, with the goal of creating a "social, Christian, German state of Austria on a corporatist basis and under strong authoritarian leadership". The Heimwehr was thus able to say that its Korneuburg Oath had become a state program. They therefore no longer saw any need to have their own political party, and the Heimatblock was dissolved on 27 September 1933. Before that, it had joined the Fatherland Front so that Emil Fey could be part of the new Dollfuss II government as Vice-Chancellor. Entry of the Heimwehr into the Fatherland Front was agreed on, but a corresponding accord was never signed by Ernst Starhemberg. The resistance within the movement, which did not want to give up its position as an independent political force, was too great.

Even when the corporatist state under Chancellor Dollfuss began to become a reality in 1933, the Heimwehr continued to cause unrest. On 30 January 1934, they staged large-scale armed marches in numerous towns in Tyrol and made demands for the establishment of an authoritarian provincial committee with the participation of Heimwehr members. The Heimwehr also participated in the February Uprising of 12–15 February 1934 that pitted government forces against the Social Democrats and ended with the victory of the Fatherland Front.

== Final years ==
After the Social Democratic Party was outlawed on 12 February 1934, the Nazi Party became the new enemy of those Heimwehr associations that supported the political course of the federal government, while the associations of Styria and Carinthia moved more and more in the direction of the Nazis and eventually merged organizationally with them.

During the period of the authoritarian Federal State of Austria (1934–1938), the Heimwehr performed police and security duties as part of the Schutzkorps. During the February uprising and the failed National Socialist July Putsch, they not only took on reconnaissance, guard and security tasks but also independently carried out smaller combat missions, thus relieving other groups such as the gendarmerie and the federal army that were fighting on the government side. When all defence associations (Wehrverbände) were disbanded in 1936 under Chancellor Kurt Schuschnigg, the Heimwehr was for the most part absorbed into the Fatherland Front and the Front Militia (Frontmiliz).

== Uniforms ==
A standard uniform was intended for Heimwehr members, but it never came about because members generally had to pay for their own clothing. The men were dressed in both military and civilian dress of all types. Only the mobile Heimwehr formations known as Jägerbataillone, which were intended to function as a kind of rapid reaction force, were completely and relatively similarly dressed, something that was made possible primarily by the fact that Starhemberg paid for their equipment with his own funds.

Because of their headgear, a hat or cap with a "Spielhahnstoß" (a hunter's term for the black grouse's tail feathers; see the picture of Ernst Rüdiger Starhemberg above) that was adopted by the Tyrolean provincial riflemen, they were also called "Hahnenschwanzler" ('one with a rooster tail'). The following mocking verse circulated among their opponents:

"Hahnenschwanzler, Hahnenschwanzler such a poor devil you are.

What a cock has on his behind, you wear with pride on your head."
