= Carl Vaugoin =

Chancellor of Austria in 1930

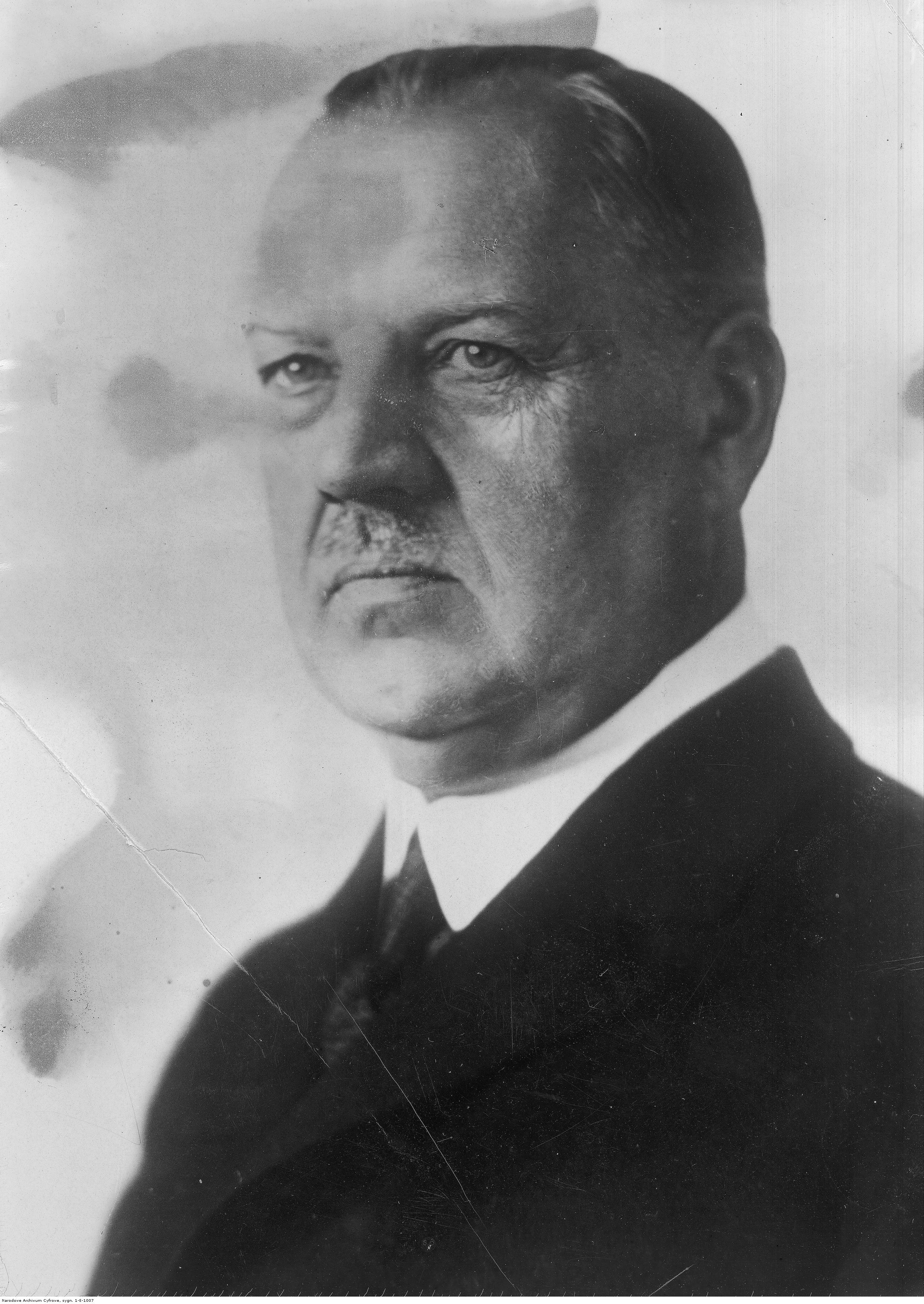
- Vaugoin in 1933

Chancellor of Austria
- In office 30 September 1930 – 4 December 1930
- President: Wilhelm Miklas
- Vice-Chancellor: Richard Schmitz
- Preceded by: Johann Schober
- Succeeded by: Otto Ender

Vice-Chancellor of Austria
- In office 26 September 1929 – 30 September 1930
- Chancellor: Johann Schober
- Preceded by: Vinzenz Schumy
- Succeeded by: Richard Schmitz

Minister of Defence
- In office 31 May 1922 – 21 September 1933
- Chancellor: Ignaz Seipel; Rudolf Ramek; Ignaz Seipel; Ernst Streeruwitz; Johannes Schober; Himself; Otto Ender; Karl Buresch; Engelbert Dollfuß
- Preceded by: Josef Wächter
- Succeeded by: Engelbert Dollfuß
- In office 28 April 1921 – 7 October 1921
- Chancellor: Michael Mayr; Johannes Schober
- Preceded by: Walter Breisky
- Succeeded by: Josef Wächter

Personal details
- Born: 8 July 1873; Vienna, Austria-Hungary
- Died: 10 June 1949 (aged 75); Krems an der Donau, Austria
- Political party: Christian Social Party

Carl Vaugoin (8 July 1873 – 10 June 1949) was an Austrian politician who served as the eleventh Chancellor of Austria from 30 September to 4 December 1930. As a member of the Christian Social Party, Vaugoin also served as Defense Minister in 15 Austrian cabinets from 1921 to 1933, as well as Vice Chancellor of Austria from 1929 to 1930.

Political offices
Preceded by Johann Schober	Chancellor of Austria; 1930	Succeeded by Otto Ender
