= Ludwig Draxler =

Austrian politician

Dr. Ludwig Draxler (1896–1972) was an Austrian attorney and politician.

Draxler was a decorated veteran of World War I and served as Austrian Finance Minister from 1935 to 1936. In 1938, the Nazi Party arrested him for criticising Germany's annexation of Austria and imprisoned him in the Dachau concentration camp.

After the end of World War II, he re-established his law practice in Vienna. Prominent clients included, among others, Otto von Habsburg, the eldest son of Karl of Austria, the last Emperor of Austria and last King of Hungary. Draxler had an instrumental role in the "Causa Habsburg" which led to the return of Otto von Habsburg to Austria as private citizen in 1966 after 48 years in exile. Corporate clients included Universal Pictures.

== See also ==
- Government of Austria
