= Heimatschutz =

German expression and cultural movement

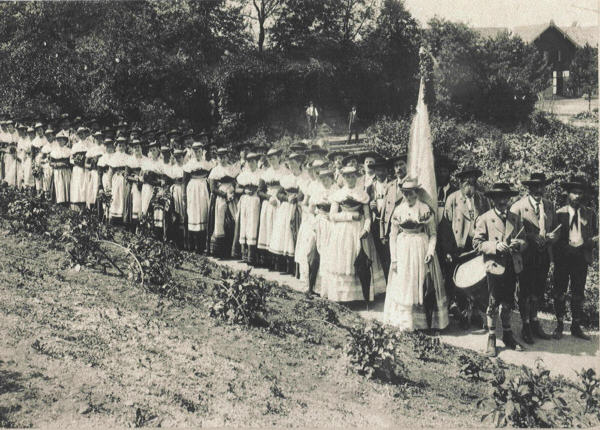
Trachtenverein Miesbach, an early folklore society in Bavaria, 1862

Heimatschutz is a German word which literally translated means 'homeland protection'. The Heimatschutz movement arose in the late 19th century in the wake of the Industrial Revolution, with a focus on nature and landscape conservation as well as the care of historic townscapes, cultural heritage and traditions, folklore and regional identity.

== History ==
The term was coined in 1897 by the conservationist Ernst Rudorff; referring to the German term Heimat which had become popular since the Napoleonic Wars of Liberation and gained increasing political meaning during the rise of Romantic nationalism. Numerous historical and folk art societies arose, such as the bourgeois Wandervogel youth movement in 1896. On 30 March 1904, Rudorff founded the Bund Heimatschutz association in Dresden; the architect Paul Schultze-Naumburg being its first head. In 1916, Austrian Max Dvořák's Katechismus der Denkmalpflege appeared. In this book Dvorak builds upon the ideas of fellow-countryman Alois Riegl and extends the idea of "homeland protection" beyond simply protection of geographical borders to encapsulate a society's culture.

A distinct early modernist Heimatschutz architectural style, characterised by traditional and regional building structural shapes, became common mainly in residential constructions up to World War II and continued until the late 1950s. The homeland literature of the late 19th century, opposing the prevalent naturalist movement, was popularised by authors like Berthold Auerbach, Ludwig Ganghofer, Peter Rosegger, or the "Heath Poet" Hermann Löns. In the Wilhelmine era, the middle-class educated Heimatschutz milieus increasingly adopted an anti-Modernist stance and developed strong ties with nationalist and chauvinist Völkisch circles. On the other hand, the idea of 'homeland protection' also became the concept of labour movements such as the German Friends of Nature (Naturfreunde).

During the interwar period in Austria, the Heimatschutz concept was adopted by paramilitary Heimwehr forces, first in the Austro-Slovene conflict in Carinthia at the end of the World War I. Upon the 1930 legislative election, their Heimatblock organisation became part of the Austrian government and later was merged into the Fatherland Front, the austrofascist single party. After the Anschluss annexation by Nazi Germany in 1938, the Vaterländische Front was disbanded; several Heimwehr members were deported to concentration camps by the SA and later the SS. By the cultural policy of the German regime, a "Blood and Soil" ideology in literature and film was promoted as an integral part of Nazi propaganda.

After World War II, the Heimat concept remained the basis of numerous light novels and Heimatfilm movies. During the Cold War era, Heimatschutz reserve battalions were deployed by the West German Bundeswehr for homeland defense. Today, the word is also used to translate the English expression "homeland security" used by the US federal government after the September 11 attacks of 2001.

== Switzerland ==
In Switzerland, the term Heimatschutz is widely considered free from historic burden and refers to preservation order and fostering of traditions in a general sense. The Schweizer Heimatschutz (SHS), best translated as Swiss Heritage, a nonprofit organisation established in 1905, is dedicated to the advancement of Switzerland's building culture. Its focus is on the preservation of important landmarks, the development of the structural environment, and the promotion of good architectural design.

== See also ==
- Regionalism (art)

== Literature ==
- "Conservation at War". Conservation at war, Miles Glendinning.
- Bickle, Peter (2002). Heimat: A Critical Theory of the German Idea of Homeland. "Canden House. ISBN 1-57113-225-2.
- Confino, Alon. The Nation as a Local Metaphor: Württemberg, Imperial Germany, and National Memory, 1871-1918. Chapel Hill: The University of North Carolina Press, 1997.
