= Streeruwitz government =

Government of Austria from May to September 1929

- Government of Austria

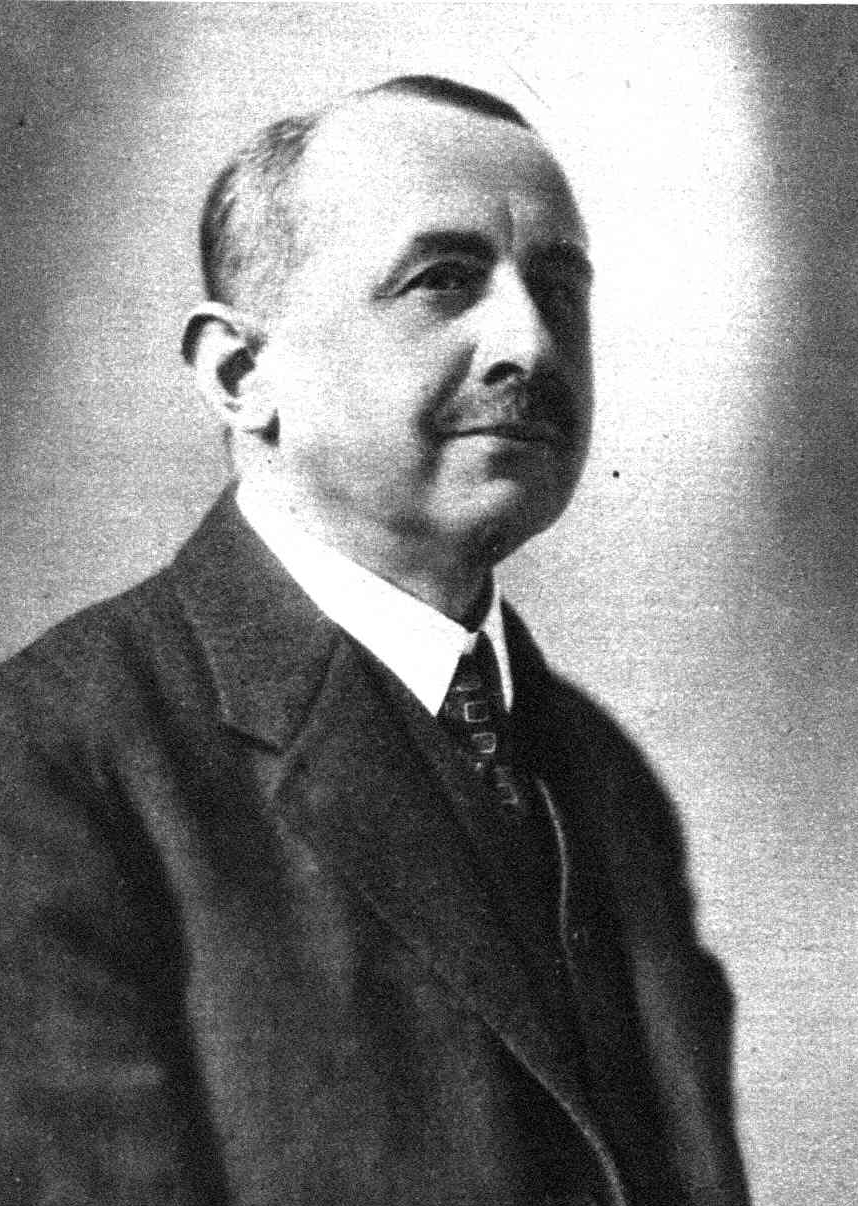
- Ernst Streeruwitz
- Date formed: May 4, 1929
- Date dissolved: September 26, 1929

People and organisations
- Head of government: Ernst Streeruwitz
- Deputy head of government: Vinzenz Schumy
- No. of ministers: 7
- Member parties: Christian Social Party; Greater German People's Party; Landbund

History
- Election: 1927
- Predecessor: Seipel V
- Successor: Schober III

In Austrian politics, the Streeruwitz government (German: Regierung Streeruwitz) was a short-lived right-of-center coalition government led by Ernst Streeruwitz, in office from May 4, 1929 to September 26, 1929. The coalition consisted of the Christian Social Party, the Greater German People's Party, and the Landbund. Although its majority in the National Council was narrow, it was a broad alliance sociologically; the coalition represented much of the middle class as well as most of the agricultural sector, along with banking and industrial interests. Its main opponents were the Social Democratic Party to the left and the extra-parliamentary Heimwehr movement to the right.

Assembled with some difficulty after the abrupt resignation of the fifth Seipel government, one of the main goals of the Streeruwitz cabinet was to mitigate Austria's enduring economic crisis. Another main goal was to reach a compromise with the Heimwehr, who were aiming to transform Austria from a parliamentary democracy to an authoritarian presidential state along the lines of Mussolini's Italy and Horthy's Hungary.

== Background ==
=== Economy ===
The First Austrian Republic had been in a state of periodic economic turmoil for most of the 1920s. Conditions in early 1929 were dire and, after a short period of relative stabilization, deteriorating once again.

The hyperinflation of the early 1920s had been brought under control by means of a currency reform; between 1923 and 1926, the discredited Austrian krone had been replaced by the Austrian schilling. The currency reform, however, had only been possible thanks to a substantial loan organized by the League of Nations, and this loan had come with conditions. In return for the intervention, Austria had to promise rigorous austerity and a policy of hard currency through harshly limited money supply. A Commissioner General appointed by the League was dispatched to Vienna to monitor and supervise the country's economic policy. One out of every three civil servants was laid off; pensions and benefits were cut severely. Unemployment rose and kept rising. By the early 1930s, some 600,000 working-age adults were involuntarily jobless – in a nation of barely 6.5 million. In early 1929, not just the unemployed, whose number had just seen one of its intermittent sharp upticks, were destitute. Even Austrians in stable formal employment had difficulties meeting basic needs.

The situation was exacerbated by an exceptionally brutal winter. Temperatures reached lows of -28.6 °C in Vienna and of -31.5 °C in Innsbruck, the lowest values recorded since 1850. The Danube, a vital waterway, froze over. Markets ran low on food. Consumers started hoarding, making the bad supply situation worse. At the worst possible moment, the shipments of coal from Czechoslovakia that Austria depended on stopped arriving. The army deployed to distribute hot soup and tea to freezing Austrians from field kitchens.

=== Political climate ===
The election of 1927 had resulted in a coalition government consisting of the Christian Social Party, the Greater German People's Party, and the Landbund. The cabinet, led by Christian Social Party chairman Ignaz Seipel, was under pressure not just from unemployment and bad weather but also from the Heimwehr, a Fascist militia movement that demanded drastic changes to Austria's system of government and that could credibly threaten civil unrest, if not a coup d'état.

The Federal Constitutional Law of 1920 established Austria as a country that was a federation in name but more or less unitary in reality, with a strong central government and limited devolution of responsibilities to Austria's nine regional administrations. The system had the support of the political left, which dominated the capital, but not the political right, which dominated most of the rest of the country. The conflict was not just about power politics but also a matter of cultural cleavages. The sixth-largest city in the world and the capital of a global power for five centuries, Vienna was a bustling, cosmopolitan, and multi-ethnic metropolis. Much of Vienna's hinterland, on the other hand, was an agrarian, poorly industrialized backwater. Dislike for the capital's intellectuals, Jews, and Slavs, and for the capital in general, was intense in parts of the countryside. The Heimwehr demanded real, effective federalism.

The Constitution of 1920 also established Austria as an archetypal parliamentary republic. The positions of president and chancellor were separate. Both president and chancellor were chosen by the legislature, meaning that neither of them had the prestige and authority that results from direct popular election. The president had considerable reserve powers but was expected to confine himself to acting as a figurehead. The chancellor was politically answerable to the National Council. What the Heimwehr envisioned instead was a presidential system with a strongman leader answerable to no one but the people, a system modeled on Benito Mussolini's Fascist Italy and Miklós Horthy's Regency Hungary.

Both the governing coalition and the main opposition party, the Social Democrats, felt that the threat the Heimwehr posed should be defused through negotiation and compromise. A few cautious amendments to the constitution that would meet the Heimwehr halfway, it was hoped, might serve to appease the militia. Chancellor Seipel felt that he was the wrong person to preside over these negotiations. Seipel, nicknamed the Prelate Without Mercy (Prälat ohne Milde) by friends and foes alike, was a hardline clericalist whose very personality would be an obstacle; in addition, his health was failing. Seipel abruptly resigned the chancellorship on April 3, 1929.

=== Personalities ===
Finding a successor for Seipel proved difficult; Seipel had dominated the Christian Social Party for years and had failed to groom an heir apparent. One obvious contender was the Christian Social governor of Styria, Anton Rintelen, an operator with ambition and a strong personal power base. Rintelen had the support of the Heimwehr but was vetoed by the Party's coalition partners. The Party approached Leopold Kunschak and Otto Ender, regional leaders with few enemies and wide respect across ideological divides, but both of them declined. Gradually, Ernst Streeruwitz emerged as the homo designatus by default. Streeruwitz was a legislator who had never held significant party office. He was a misfit in the Christian Social caucus socially and an eccentric ideologically. His outsider status in his own party now made him seem an apposite choice for the mediator who was going to preside over negotiations about constitutional reform.

Streeruwitz and his cabinet were sworn in on May 4.

Rintelen had already been harboring personal dislike for Streeruwitz before the latter received the appointment the former wanted.

== Composition ==
The government consisted of chancellor, vice chancellor, and seven ministers:

Cabinet members
Portfolio	Minister	Took office	Left office	Party
Chancellery
Chancellor	Ernst Streeruwitz	4 May 1929	26 September 1929	CS
Vice-Chancellor	Vinzenz Schumy	4 May 1929	26 September 1929	Landbund
Ministries
Minister of Justice	Franz Slama	4 May 1929	26 September 1929	GDVP
Minister of Education	Emmerich Czermak	4 May 1929	26 September 1929	CS
Minister of Social Affairs	Josef Resch	4 May 1929	26 September 1929	CS
Minister of Finance	Johann Josef Mittelberger	4 May 1929	26 September 1929	CS
Minister of Agriculture and Forestry	Florian Födermayr	4 May 1929	26 September 1929	CS
Minister of Commerce and Transport	Hans Schürff	4 May 1929	26 September 1929	GDVP
Minister of the Army	Carl Vaugoin	4 May 1929	26 September 1929	CS

== Activity ==
Streeruwitz' inaugural address on May 7 mainly dealt with economic and foreign policy but also included a firm commitment to representative democracy: ideological disputes should be settled, Streeruwitz declared, by the people's elected delegates and not by extra-parliamentary force. The statement was an unmistakable jab at the Heimwehr, a paramilitary force whose influence was based entirely on its ability to threaten violence. The implied espousal of a strong legislature also was a rejection of the idea of a dominant president. Although Streeruwitz also promised to assume "the role of an honest broker" ("die Rolle des ehrlichen Maklers"), the Heimwehr instantly decided that Streeruwitz was an enemy.

The Streeruwitz government was seemingly successful at first. The ruling coalition and the Social Democrats reached compromises on a number of strategic issues; Streeruwitz gained recognition for being result-oriented and pragmatic. In June, government and opposition agreed on and jointly passed an overdue reform of Austria's tenancy law. Later the same month, unemployment insurance and pension system were reformed. In July, a package of relief measures for senior citizens on small pensions was passed.

Tensions appeared to decrease; the early summer was relatively peaceful.

== Resignation ==
On August 18, a bloody street fight in Sankt Lorenzen im Mürztal, Styria brought the belligerence to the surface again and heightened it to unprecedented levels. Heimwehr and Schutzbund, the Social Democratic party militia, had both announced a rally for the same place and day. Competing Heimwehr and Schutzbund rallies were a semi-regular occurrence, but the participants were usually kept in check by police. Even though he was warned that Sankt Lorenzen police would not have the numbers to keep the two factions apart, Governor Rintelen refused to either prohibit the rallies or arrange for the army to send help. The resulting clash ended with 3 dead and 55 injured, 27 of them severely.

Rintelen swiftly went to work using the disaster to undermine the chancellor, with immediate success. The Christian Social establishment placed the blame for the bloodshed squarely on the Schutzbund, implicitly taking sides with the Heimwehr and against the chancellor. The governor of Tyrol, Franz Stumpf, painted the Schutzbund as a mob of rioters and claimed that the Heimwehr had played the role of de facto law enforcement. In the person of its leader, Richard Steidle, the Heimwehr itself insisted that it had done nothing wrong; it was impossible for "good democrats" ("gute Demokraten") to show "toleration" ("Duldsamkeit") towards Marxists. Demands for constitutional reform became louder; the Landbund essentially went over to the side of the Heimwehr.

Streeruwitz petitioned his old industrialist associates to cut off the funding they had been providing to the Heimwehr; the industrialists declined. Even Seipel, his former mentor, now turned against him. The chancellor was left discredited and without allies; the Heimwehr was only getting bolder. When Streeruwitz left Austria to represent the country at the 10th General Assembly of the League of Nations, his opponents used his absence to coordinate his overthrow and to agree on a successor: Johann Schober, an independent who had already been chancellor from 1921 to 1922, was to take the reins again. On September 20, in order to ratchet up the pressure and bring matters to a head, the Heimwehr began openly threatening a coup d'état should the government fail to comply with its demands for constitutional reform. The threat was taken seriously, including abroad. The stock market and the exchange rate of the schilling took an immediate and worrying hit.

By the early hours of September 25, Streeruwitz was widely considered a dead man walking. The Heimwehr announced they were confident that Streeruwitz would be gone by nightfall. Realizing that the announcement reflected a backroom deal between the Heimwehr and parts of his own party, the chancellor bowed to the inevitable, going so far as to proclaim his support for Schober as his successor. Streeruwitz tendered his resignation in the afternoon, although he agreed to stay on in a nominal caretaker capacity until his successor could be formally appointed the next day.

On September 26, the third Schober government was sworn in.
