= Ernst Streeruwitz =

Austrian businessman and politician

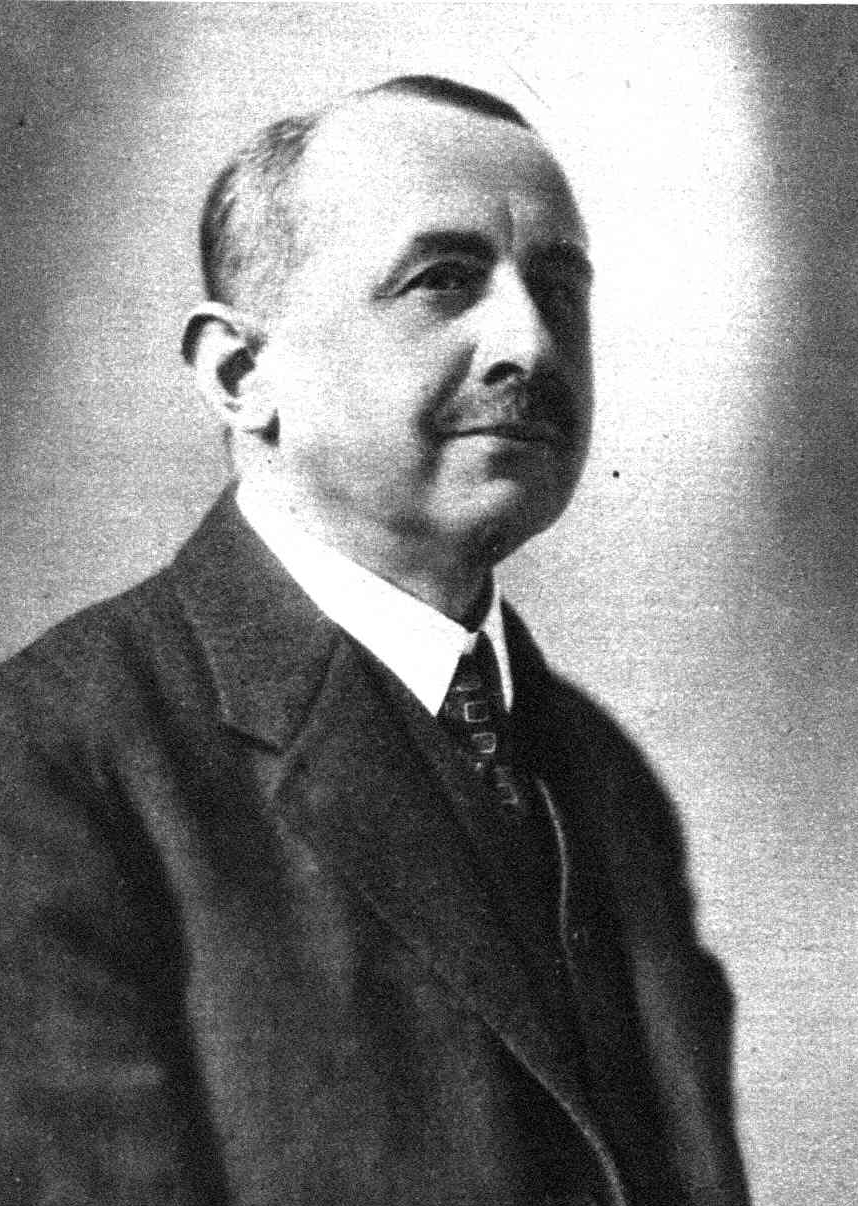

Chancellor of Austria
- In office 4 May 1929 – 26 September 1929
- President: Wilhelm Miklas
- Vice-Chancellor: Vinzenz Schumy
- Preceded by: Ignaz Seipel
- Succeeded by: Johann Schober

Minister of Foreign Affairs
- In office 4 May 1929 – 26 September 1929
- Preceded by: Ignaz Seipel
- Succeeded by: Johann Schober

Personal details
- Born: 23 September 1874 Mies, Bohemia, Austria-Hungary
- Died: 19 October 1952 (aged 78) Vienna, Austria
- Party: Christian Social Party
- Education: University of Vienna

Ernst Streeruwitz (born Ernst Streer Ritter von Streeruwitz 23 September 1874 – 19 October 1952) was an Austrian military officer, businessman, political scientist and politician. A member of the industrialist wing of the Christian Social Party, Streeruwitz served on the National Council from November 1923 to October 1930 and as chancellor and foreign minister from May to September 1929.

== Early life ==
Streeruwitz was born Ernst Streer Ritter von Streeruwitz on 23 September 1874, in the Bohemian city of Mies.

The child was the youngest son of Georg Adolf von Streeruwitz, a member of the Imperial Council and the city's hereditary postmaster. The Streeruwitz family, originally from Friesland, had migrated to Bohemia during the Thirty Years' War and been ennobled for outstanding bravery during the Battle of Prague. Ever since, the family had been fiercely loyal to the Austrian Empire and provided officers for the army and career civil servants for the Mies municipal and regional administrations. In the 19th century, the family found itself strongly in support of German unification. Ernst Streeruwitz's childhood was colored by the dissonance between the family's ancient loyalty to the House of Habsburg and its newfound pan-Germanism. The two positions had become difficult to reconcile after Austria's defeat in the Battle of Königgrätz forced the Habsburgs to clamp down on civic nationalism as a matter of political survival.

The youngest son was perpetually sickly, but Streeruwitz was groomed for a career in diplomacy by his father. The boy, who was already bilingual in German and Czech, his mother was an ethnically-Czech daughter of the city bourgeoisie, was taught French from an early age and generally received a thorough education. He completed elementary school with distinction and so attended the local gymnasium on a scholarship. Two years before Streeruwitz graduated from the gymnasium in 1892 his father died. His mother saw no hope of getting the son admitted into the diplomatic service without the late patriarch's political connections and so persuaded Streeruwitz to join the army instead.

== Career ==
=== Austria-Hungary ===
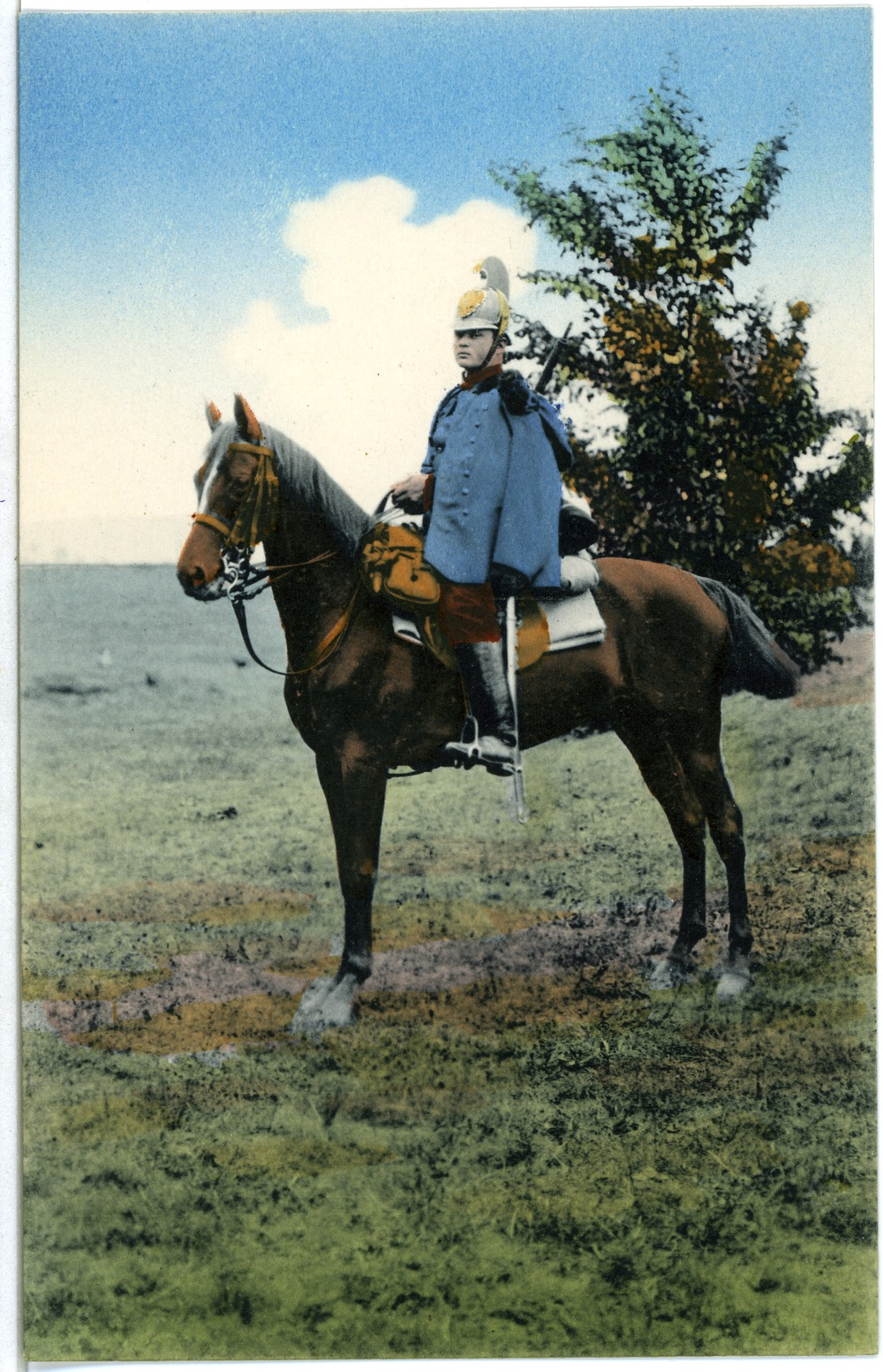
A soldier of the 7th Bohemian Dragoons (Duke of Lorraine's) on a 1903 picture postcard

His secondary education completed, Streeruwitz moved to Vienna and enrolled at the Theresian Military Academy. He graduated with honors. Starting in 1895, he served as a lieutenant with the 7th Bohemian Dragoons (Duke of Lorraine's), stationed in Lissa an der Elbe at the time. Streeruwitz received excellent evaluations from his superior officers and was encouraged to sit the entrance exam for the War College, graduating from which would have all but guaranteed a stellar career. Streeruwitz took the exam in 1899 and passed with flying colors. A mere year later, however, Streeruwitz's health suffered a serious relapse after a demanding field training exercise. Streeruwitz lost his faith in his ability to withstand the rigors of military life and applied to be granted reservist status. His request was approved in 1901.

While waiting to be allowed to leave active service, Streeruwitz began studying mechanical engineering at the College of Technology and law at the University of Vienna. Friedrich Franz Joseph von Leitenberger, a fellow Bohemian officer whom Streeruwitz has befriended during his time as a lieutenant of the dragoons, hired Streeruwitz as a technical consultant as soon as the latter's transfer to the reserve was final. Streeruwitz was tasked with helping to modernize Leitenberger's factories. He reorganized Leitenberger's obsolete textile printing plant in Josefsthal with some success and was made the manager of the factory in 1902.

His professional future now secure, Streeruwitz married Christine Strobl, a Bohemian from Prague.

Following Leitenberger's death in a car accident in 1904, Streeruwitz found himself sidelined. He clashed with the company's new owners as well as with their bankers. In 1913, he was kicked upstairs to a position in senior management, a promotion that forced him to move to Vienna again. In 1914, Streeruwitz finally quit. With the outbreak of World War I, he also volunteered to return to active military service. In October, Streeruwitz became managing director of a textile printing plant in Neunkirchen. A few days later, he was called up by the army, effective November.

Still in poor health and unfit for service at the front, Streeruwitz spent the war as an administrator. He helped reorganize the military mail service, worked to ensure the humane treatment of Austro-Hungarian prisoners of war, organized the use of enemy prisoners as agricultural laborers, co-edited a newspaper for captive Russians, and wrote a five-volume book on legal issues surrounding prisoners of war. Streeruwitz was considered highly competent and was decorated several times.

=== First Austrian Republic ===
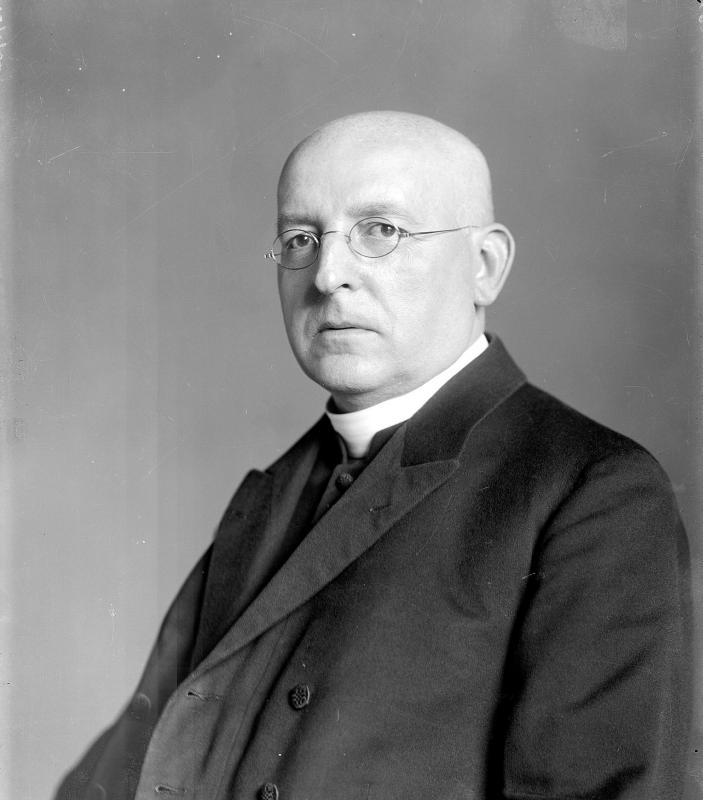
Ignaz Seipel, the leader of the Christian Social Party, was Streeruwitz's mentor and immediate predecessor as chancellor.

Streeruwitz experienced the collapse of the empire as a personal catastrophe. He returned to his native Bohemia; in his autobiography, he would later claim that "Bolshevik emissaries" in Vienna had threatened to murder both him and his family. He nevertheless moved to Vienna a third time when it became clear that the Republic of Austria would not be able to press home its claim to the majority-German parts of Bohemia.

Streeruwitz resumed his management position in Neunkirchen and went on to prove himself a capable organizer yet again. He soon became the chairman of the employers' association of the Lower Austrian textile industry (German: Arbeitgeberverband der Niederösterreichischen Textilindustrie) and the association's representative in the Federation of Austrian Industries (Hauptverband der Industrie).

The quarrelsome labour relations and recurrent strikes of the era pushed Streeruwitz into the public spotlight. In terms of policy, Streeruwitz believed that the answer to Austria's economic troubles was increased productivity; that belief led him to oppose social measures such as working time reductions and to advocate for a hard line against strikers. On a personal level, he appears to have combined genuine concern for workers' living conditions with unreconstructed aristocratic paternalism. The Social Democrats quickly became convinced that Streeruwitz was an enemy of the working class. The Christian Social Party appreciated his (implied but unambiguous) support for the economic policy of Chancellor Ignaz Seipel.

In 1924, Streeruwitz was appointed the chief curator (Oberkurator) of the Lower Austrian regional mortgage bank (Landeshypothekenbank), a struggling lender of vital importance to the region's agricultural sector. Streeruwitz turned the bank around. In 1929, he took the initiative in setting up a regional mortgage bank for the neighboring (and structurally-underserved) province of Burgenland.

=== Member of National Council ===
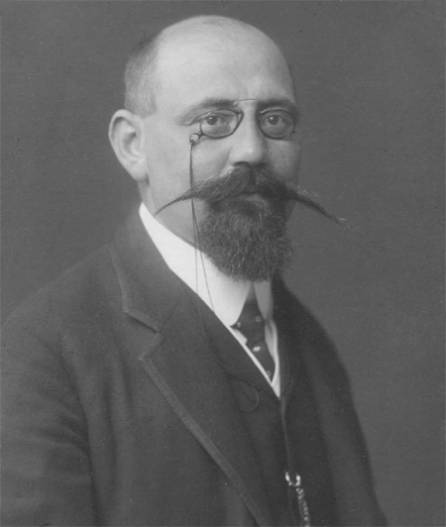
Karl Renner, the leader of the Social Democratic Party and Streeruwitz's notional main opponent

During the runup to the 1923 legislative elections, the Federation of Austrian Industries and the Christian Social Party negotiated an agreement of mutual support. The federation would assist the party financially; the party would run candidates sympathetic to the industrialists. Streeruwitz agreed to be added to the Christian Social candidates, pursuant to the agreement, and was elected to the National Council.

Except for his strong dislike for Marxism and his opposition to Social Democratic labour policy, Streeruwitz was ideologically at odds with his party. Whereas Austrian independence had gradually become one of the Christian Social Party's defining platform planks, Streeruwitz continued to support the integration of Austria into the German Reich. Catholic clericalism was another one of the party's defining platform planks, but Streeruwitz, like most Austrian pan-Germans and like his father before him, was hostile to political Catholicism. Streeruwitz also was a poor fit socially. He looked down on the petite bourgeoisie, which was the Christian Socials' core constituency and the faction's main source of recruits. He criticized his caucus for what he thought of as its lack of unity and discipline; he ridiculed its members for their poverty. Even though he vocally despised leading Social Democrats such as Otto Bauer and Robert Danneberg, and the Arbeiter-Zeitung reciprocated with a string of personal attacks, Streeruwitz thought highly of Karl Renner and was ready to work with the opposing side if common ground could be found.

In his years as a legislator, Streeruwitz rarely rose to speak in plenary sessions but was active in several committees. He helped draft a number of significant statutes and published numerous opinion pieces arguing his policy positions. Streeruwitz fought, in particular, for protective tariffs. Postwar hyperinflation was causing the country to be flooded with cheap imported goods. This increased importation endangered Austria's struggling manufacturing sector, but the country was largely defenseless because of a number of free trade agreements that the empire's successor states had hastily agreed to immediately after its collapse. Tariffs were controversial on both sides of the political spectrum. Labor politicians feared rising consumer prices. Shareholders of corporations that had become involuntary multinationals with the disintegration of the empire were worried about their interests abroad. Streeruwitz won, and in 1925, significant customs barriers were put in place.

Streeruwitz's second main concern was banking supervision. The hyperinflation of the 1920s caused a number of banks to fail but mostly only because the sector had already been weakened from years of corruption and general mismanagement. Social Democrats and German Nationalists demanded a rigorous crackdown. Streeruwitz's own proposals, although moderate in comparison, were met with fierce opposition from within his own party. The National Council eventually passed a bill that tightened the screws, but the statute was too little, too late. Streeruwitz's failure indirectly caused the collapse of a bank owned by Anton Rintelen, the powerful governor of Styria. The lasting enmity of Rintelen that Streeruwitz earned for himself would later contribute to his downfall.

=== Chancellor ===
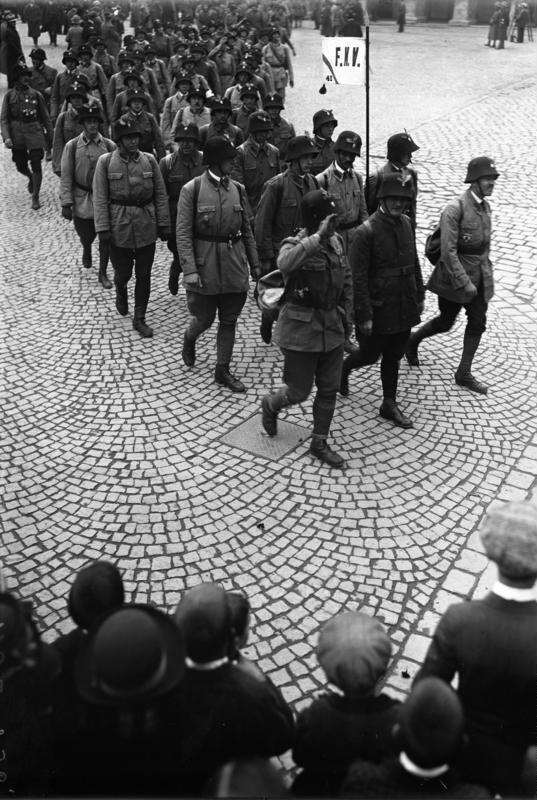
In spite of being loosely affiliated with his own party, the Austrofascist Heimwehr was Streeruwitz's main antagonist and indirectly caused both his appointment and his resignation merely five months later.

Still an outsider with no credible personal power base, Streeruwitz abruptly became chancellor in May 1929.

The Federal Constitutional Law of 1920 established Austria as an archetypal parliamentary republic. The positions of president and chancellor were separate. Both president and chancellor were chosen by the legislature and so neither of them had the prestige and authority that results from direct popular election. The president had considerable reserve powers but was expected to confine himself to acting as a figurehead. The chancellor was politically answerable to the National Council. The law also established Austria as a country that was a federation in name but more or less unitary in reality. The growing Austrofascist Heimwehr movement demanded a move to a presidential system with a strong leader, modelled on Benito Mussolini's Fascist Italy and Miklós Horthy's Regency Hungary. Resentful of the political and cultural dominance of the capital, the Heimwehr also demanded real effective federalism.

Vienna was home to two million people, almost one out of three Austrians at the time. The sixth-largest city in the world and the capital of a global power for five centuries, Vienna was a bustling cosmopolitan metropolis, even in times of economic hardship. Much of Vienna's hinterland, on the other hand, was an agrarian poorly-industrialized backwater. Dislike for the capital's intellectuals, Jews, and status was intense in some corners of the political right.

By early 1929, actors all over the political spectrum feared that the Heimwehr movement had become a threat to democracy. The ranks of those worried included parts of the Christian Social Party with which the Heimwehr movement was (then loosely) affiliated. The Social Democratic Party was willing to negotiate a constitutional reform that would meet the Heimwehr halfway. Ignaz Seipel, the chancellor who led the Christian Social Party, decided that he was the wrong person to preside over these negotiations. Seipel, nicknamed the "prelate without mercy" ("Prälat ohne Milde") by friends and foes alike, was a hardline clericalist whose very personality would be an obstacle. Itn addition, his health was failing. Seipel resigned the chancellorship on 3 April 1929.

Finding a successor for Seipel proved difficult. Obvious candidates like Leopold Kunschak and Otto Ender declined to step up. Rintelen threw his hat into the ring but was too popular with the Heimwehr and too controversial everywhere else. Streeruwitz emerged as the new leader mainly by default; having drafted his list of ministers, he was formally appointed on 4 May. In theory, Streeruwitz had been dealt a strong hand. The coalition government that he led included the Christian Social Party, the German Nationalists and the Landbund, an alliance so broad that Streeruwitz could govern without Heimwehr support or toleration. In practice, the cabinet that Streeruwitz had managed to assemble was tantamount to a capitulation to Heimwehr demands. Even though Streeruwitz was for retaining the existing model of strong central government and limited devolution, his ministers were not representatives of ideological factions so much as representatives of provincial governments.

Streeruwitz's inaugural address on 7 May mainly dealt with economic and foreign policy but also included a firm commitment to representative democracy. Ideological disputes should be settled, Streeruwitz declared, by the people's elected delegates, not by extraparliamentary force. The statement was an unmistakable jab at the Heimwehr, a paramilitary force whose influence was based entirely on its ability to threaten violence. The implied espousal of a strong legislature also was a rejection of the idea of a dominant president. Although Streeruwitz also promised to assume "the role of an honest broker" (die Rolle des ehrlichen Maklers), the Heimwehr instantly decided that Streeruwitz was an enemy.

Streeruwitz's government was seemingly successful at first. The ruling coalition and the Social Democrats reached compromises on a number of strategic issues. Tenancy law, unemployment insurance and the pension system were reformed. Tensions appeared to decrease, and the early summer was peaceful. On 18 August, however, a bloody street fight in Sankt Lorenzen im Mürztal, Styria, brought the belligerence to the surface again and heightened it to unprecedented levels. Both the Heimwehr and the Schutzbund, the Social Democratic militia, had announced a rally for the same place and day. Competing Heimwehr and Schutzbund rallies were a semiregular occurrence, but the participants were usually kept in check by police. Even though he had been warned that the Sankt Lorenzen police would not have the numbers to keep the two factions apart, Governor Rintelen refused to prohibit the rallies or to arrange for the army to send assistance. The resulting clash ended with 3 dead and 55 injured, 27 of them severely. Rintelen immediately went to work using the disaster to undermine the chancellor. The fallout left Streeruwitz discredited and the Heimwehr emboldened. The militia openly threatened a putsch if the government failed to comply with its demands for constitutional reform.

Streeruwitz petitioned his old industrialist allies to cut off the funding they had been providing to the Heimwehr, but the industrialists declined. Even Seipel, his former mentor, now turned against him. When Streeruwitz left Austria to represent the country at the Tenth General Assembly of the League of Nations, his opponents used his absence to co-ordinate his overthrow and to agree on a successor. Streeruwitz's fate was sealed. Faced with vicious attacks from all sides, impossible demands and a threat on the part of the Landbund to leave the coalition, Streeruwitz resigned, effective 26 September.

== Later years ==
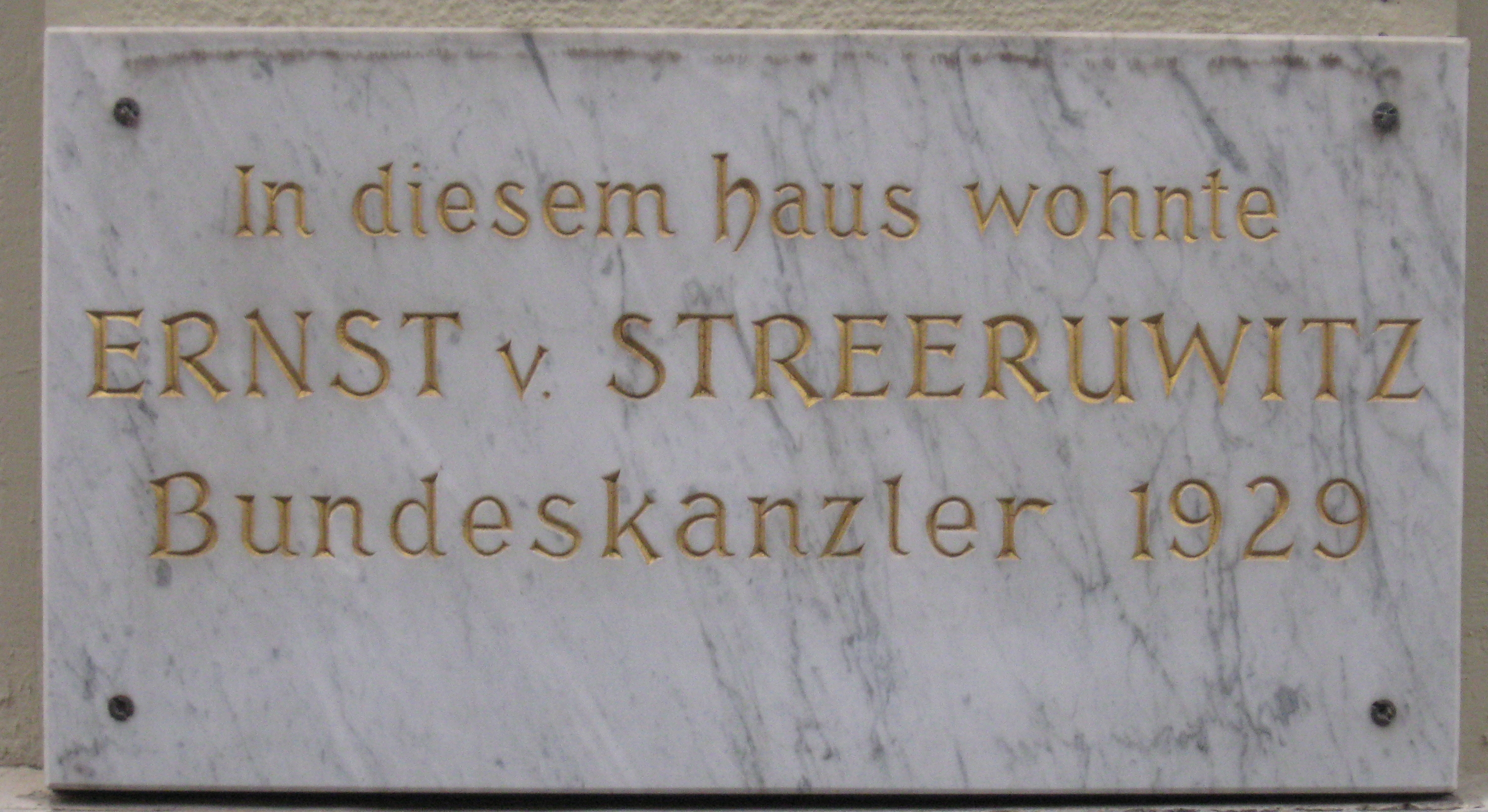
Memorial plaque on one of the houses Streeruwitz lived in during his years in Vienna

Streeruwitz did not stand for election to the National Council again; his tenure as a legislator thus ended with the 1930 legislative elections. Nevertheless, Streeruwitz remained politically active. He traveled, lectured, and campaigned for the integration of Austria into the German Reich. He also continued to hold political offices. In 1927, Streeruwitz had been elected deputy chairman of the Chamber of Commerce (German: Handelskammer). In 1930, he was elected the chamber's chairman proper.

Streeruwitz's loyalties remained complicated. Although he still opposed the Christian Social Party's policy of Austrian independence, a fact about which he was increasingly outspoken, he regularly sided with the Christian Socials and against both his fellow pan-Germans and his Chamber of Commerce peers in matters of economic policy. He supported the Austrofascist corporate state model of governance, insofar that he did not have to worry about the existence and influence of his chamber. The Christian Social party and later the Fatherland Front occasionally hinted that Streeruwitz was being considered for a political comeback but ultimately removed him from his position as the chairman of the chamber. There was no room for independent professional lobbying groups in the Austrofascist system; in 1935, Streeruwitz was replaced by a government-appointed commissar.

Consistent in his pan-Germanism, Streeruwitz supported both the 1936 July Accords, an agreement between Austria and the Reich that turned the former into a vassal state of the latter, and the 1938 Anschluss, the military invasion that finally ended Austria's existence as a sovereign state altogether. Streeruwitz approached the Nazi government and offered his assistance, but the Nazis declined.

Streeruwitz subsequently retired from public life. He resumed his studies at the University of Vienna, graduating with a doctorate in political science in 1939.

In 1950, Streeruwitz suffered a stroke that left him permanently impaired. He died on 19 October 1952.

== Legacy ==
Streeruwitz has largely faded from public consciousness. When he is mentioned, it is often to illustrate how weak and short-lived the governments of the Austrian First Republic tended to be. The struggling democracy, shaken by many crises and in a permanent unofficial state of emergency, went through no fewer than fifteen chancellors in twenty years. Even Ignaz Seipel, the dominant political figure of the era, was unseated after only two years in office. Streeruwitz was just one of many heads of government in a period of intense turbulence for the Austrian First Republic.

== Selected publications ==
- Streeruwitz, Ernst (1928). Weltwirtschaft und Wanderung: Eine Antwort an Maedonald und eine Mahnung an uns selbst. Vienna: Österreichische Druck- und Verlagsgesellschaft.
- — (1931). Rationalisierung und Weltwirtschaft. Vienna: Springer.
- — (1931). Ordnung und Aufbau der Weltwirtschaft. Vienna: Springer.
- — (1934). Wie es war: Erinnerungen und Erlebnisse eines alten Österreichers. Vienna: Steyrermühl-Verlag.
- — (1935). Die Friedenssicherung und ihre Methoden: eine kritische Studie. Vienna: Manz.
- — (1937). Springflut über Österreich: Erinnerungen, Erlebnisse und Gedanken aus bewegter Zeit; 1914–1919. Vienna: Bernina.
- — (1937). Österreichs Wirtschaftsstruktur. Brixlegg: Heimat-Verlag.
