= 1927 Austrian legislative election =

← 1923	24 April 1927	1930 →

All 165 seats in the National Council of Austria 83 seats needed for a majority
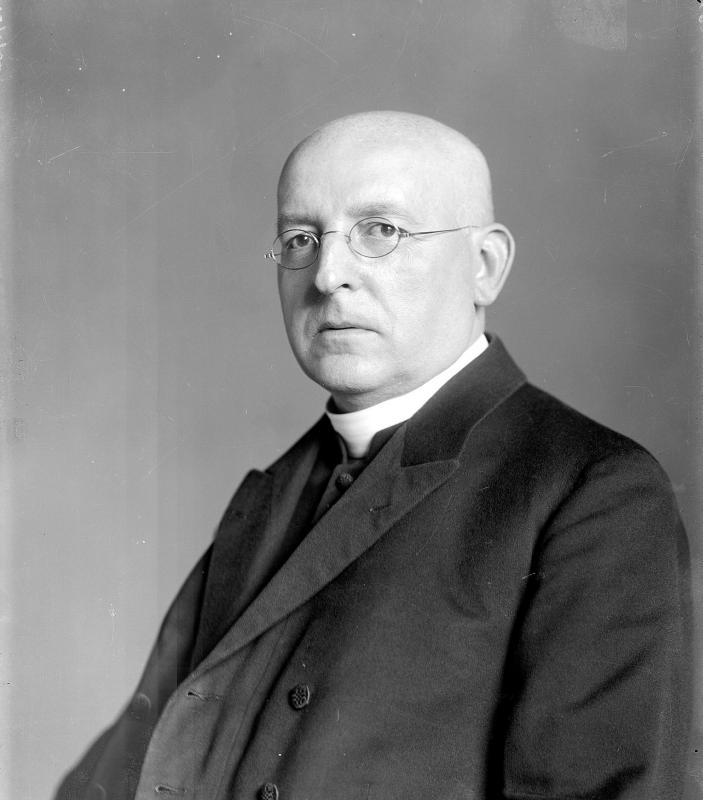

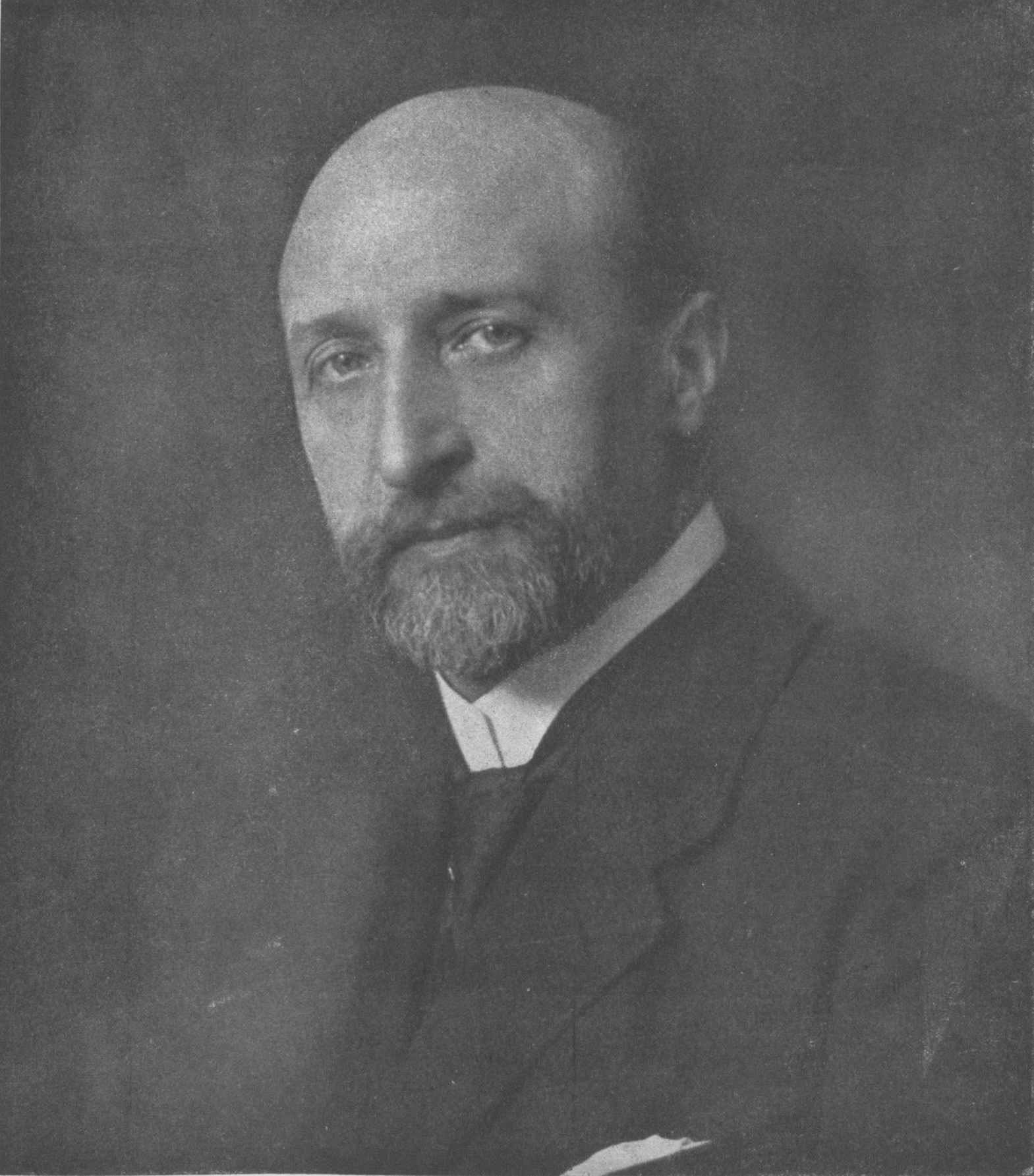

	First party	Second party	Third party
Leader	Ignaz Seipel	Karl Seitz	Karl Hartleb
Party	CS–GDVP	SPÖ	Landbund
Last election	44.05%, 82 seats (CS)	39.60%, 68 seats	3.01%, 5 seats
Seats won	85	71	9
Seat change	▲3	▲3	▲4
Popular vote	1,756,761	1,539,635	230,157
Percentage	48.24%	42.28%	6.32%
Swing	▲4.19 pp	▲2.68 pp	▲3.31 pp
Chancellor before election
Ignaz Seipel
CS
Elected Chancellor
Ignaz Seipel
CS

Parliamentary elections were held in Austria on 24 April 1927. The result was a victory for the Unity List (Einheitsliste), an alliance of the Christian Social Party and the Greater German People's Party, which won 85 of the 165 seats. However this brief coalition failed to result in any larger proportion of the votes than when the CSP ran alone, losing votes to the Landbund. Voter turnout was 89.3%.

== Results ==
Party	Votes	%	Seats	+/–
Unity List (CS–GDVP)	1,756,761	48.24	85	–
Social Democratic Workers' Party	1,539,635	42.28	71	+3
Landbund for Austria	230,157	6.32	9	+4
Udeverband – Association against Corruption	35,471	0.97	0	New
National Socialist Bloc	26,991	0.74	0	New
Communist Party of Austria	16,119	0.44	0	0
Democratic List	15,112	0.41	0	0
Jewish Party	10,845	0.30	0	0
Party of the Carinthian Slovenes	9,334	0.26	0	0
German National Socialist Workers' Party	779	0.02	0	New
Austrian Small Business Party	251	0.01	0	New
Association of Independent Citizens	60	0.00	0	New
Farmers and Traders of all Types Party	11	0.00	0	New
Total	3,641,526	100.00	165	0
Valid votes	3,641,526	99.02		
Invalid/blank votes	35,907	0.98		
Total votes	3,677,433	100.00		
Registered voters/turnout	4,119,626	89.27		
Source: Nohlen & Stöver
