= Civic Workers' Party =

Political party in Austria

The Civic Workers' Party or Civic Labour Party (German: Bürgerliche Arbeitspartei) was a minor political party in Austria during the 1920s. It was led by former imperial foreign minister of Austria-Hungary, Ottokar Czernin.

== History ==
The only parliamentary election contested by the party was in 1920, when the party was part of the Democratic Parties alliance alongside the Democrats and the Burgenland Citizens' and Farmers' Party. The alliance won one seat, taken by Czernin of the Civic Workers' Party. Among the party's candidates were a number of women's rights activists, including Elise Richter, Marianne Hainisch and Helene Granitsch.

After Czernin's retirement from politics in 1923, the party merged with the Democratic Party and Civic Freedom Party to form the Civic Democratic Labour Party (Bürgerlich-demokratische Arbeitspartei) which received just 0.57% of the vote and failed to win a seat in the 1923 parliamentary election.
