= 1923 Austrian legislative election =

← 1920	21 October 1923	1927 →

All 165 seats in the National Council 83 seats needed for a majority
- Turnout: 87.05%
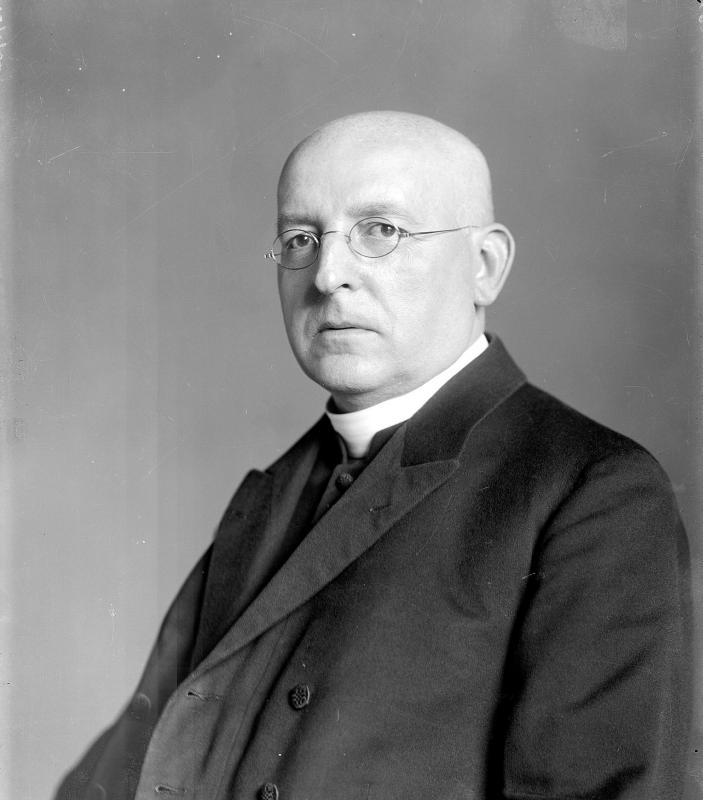

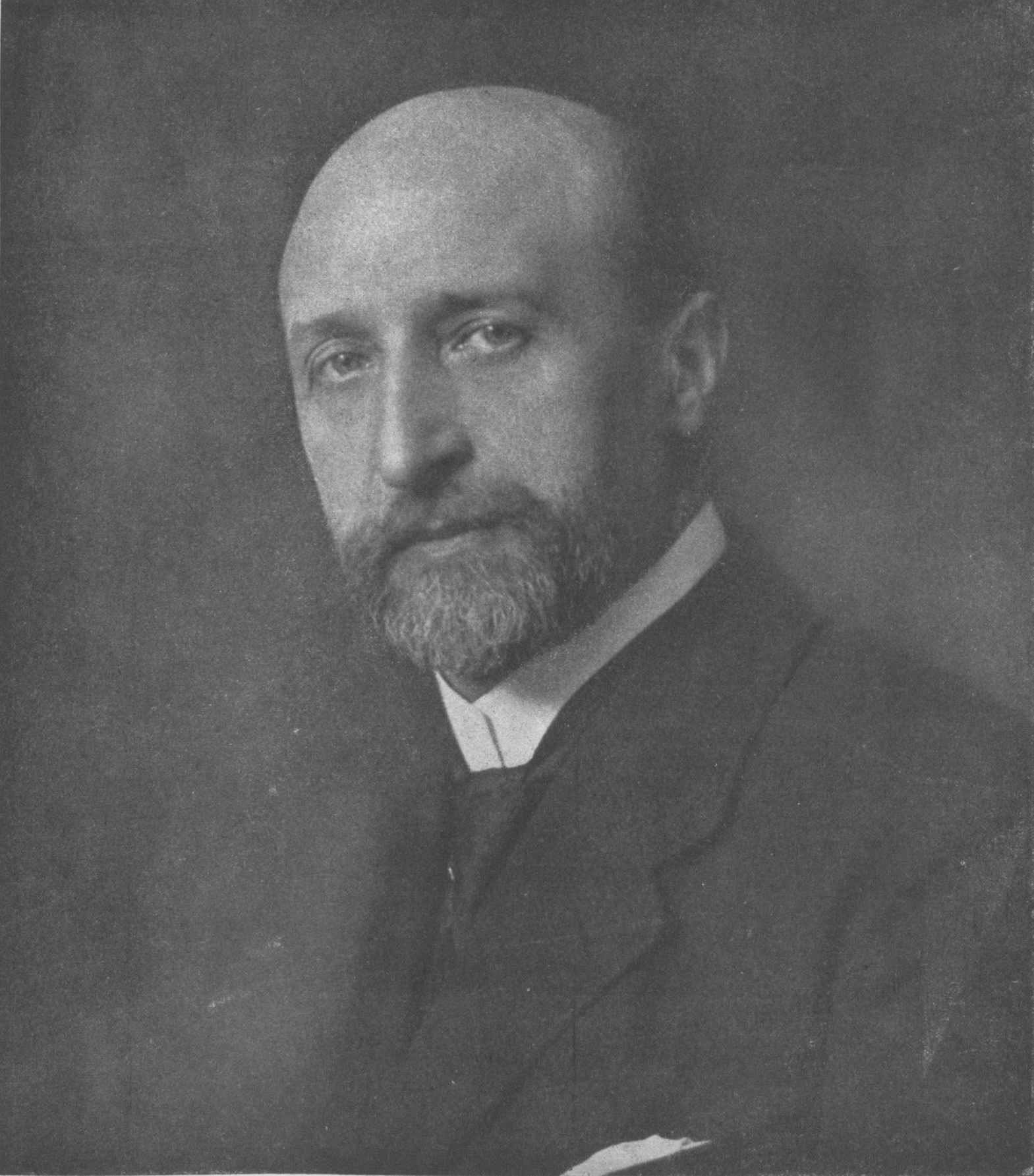

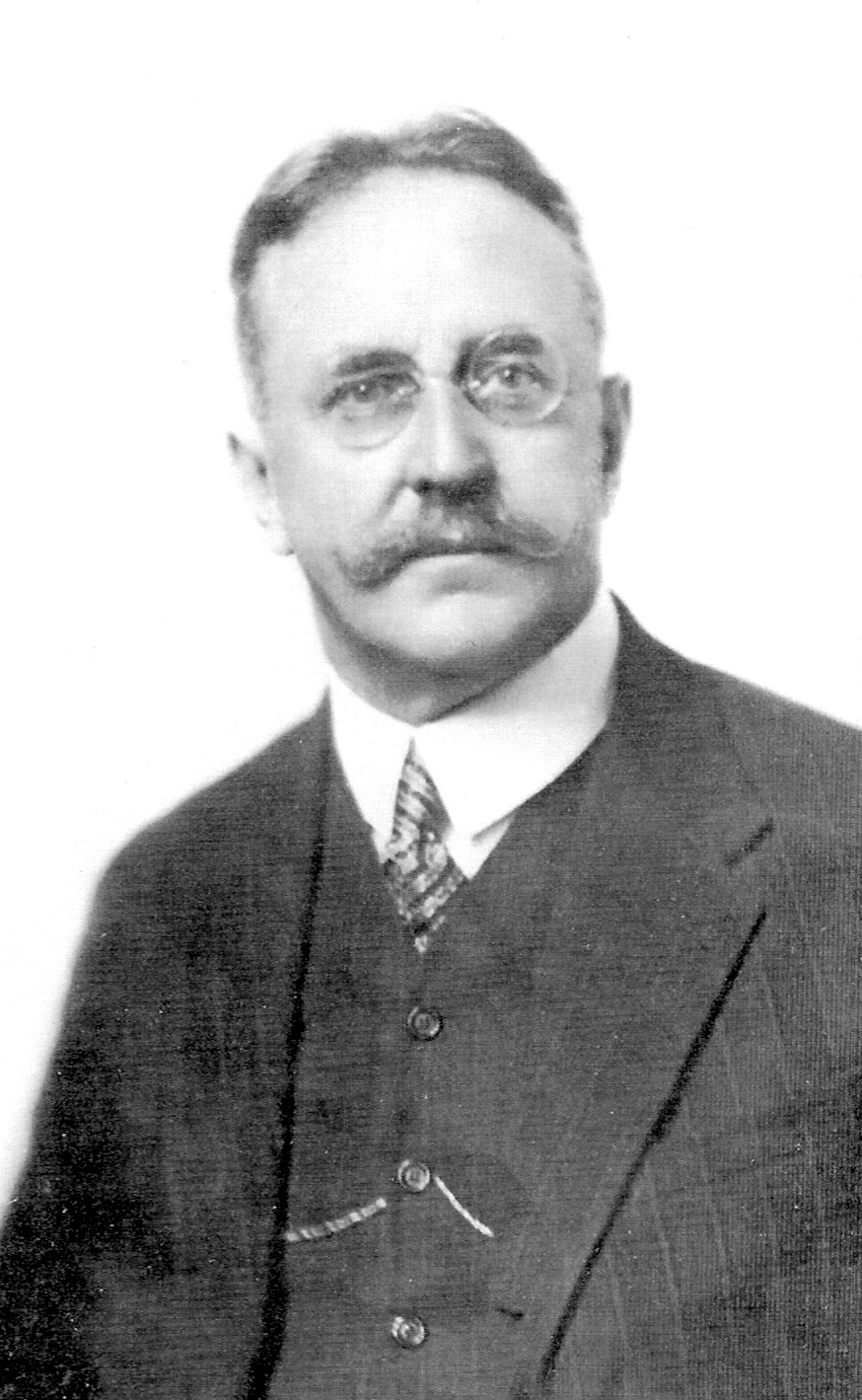
	First party	Second party	Third party
Leader	Ignaz Seipel	Karl Seitz	Franz Dinghofer
Party	CS	SDAPÖ	GDVP
Last election	41.79%, 85 seats	35.99%, 69 seats	13.08%, 21 seats
Seats won	82	68	10
Seat change	▼3	▼1	▼11
Popular vote	1,459,047	1,311,870	259,379
Percentage	44.05%	39.60%	7.83%
Swing	▲2.26 pp	▲3.61 pp	▼5.25 pp
Chancellor before election
Ignaz Seipel
CS
Elected Chancellor
Ignaz Seipel
CS

Parliamentary elections were held in Austria on 21 October 1923. The result was a victory for the Christian Social Party, which won 82 of the 165 seats. Voter turnout was 87.0%.

== Results ==
Party	Votes	%	Seats	+/–
Christian Social Party	1,459,047	44.05	82	–3
Social Democratic Workers' Party	1,311,870	39.60	68	–1
Greater German People's Party–Landbund	259,375	7.83	10	–11
Landbund	99,583	3.01	5	−2
Carinthian Unity List (CS–GdP)	95,465	2.88	0	New
Jewish Electoral Group	24,970	0.75	0	New
Communist Party of Austria	22,164	0.67	0	0
Middle Class Democratic Party	18,886	0.57	0	New
Party of the Carinthian Slovenes	9,868	0.30	0	0
Czechoslovak Minority Party	7,580	0.23	0	New
Croatian Party	2,557	0.08	0	New
Kaiser Loyalty People's Party	1,235	0.04	0	New
Federation of all Workers	6	0.00	0	New
Total	3,312,606	100.00	165	–18
Valid votes	3,312,606	98.86		
Invalid/blank votes	38,249	1.14		
Total votes	3,350,855	100.00		
Registered voters/turnout	3,849,484	87.05		
Source: Nohlen & Stöver
