= Treaty of Lana =

1921 agreement between Czechoslovakia and Austria

The Treaty of Lana is the name for the agreement between the Czechoslovak State and the First Austrian Republic, signed on 16 December 1921 at Lány Castle, for which the treaty is named. The two states promised each other to honor the Treaty of Saint-Germain-en-Laye, to respect each other's borders, to support each other diplomatically, and to remain neutral if either of them should be attacked by a third party. They further promised each other not to tolerate any activity on their own soil that aimed to undermine the security of the other, and to support each other against any attempt to restore the Habsburg regime. Economic agreements on trade and transport were also discussed, including a loan from Czechoslovakia to Austria of CZK 500 million and food and coal deliveries.

From the point of view of the Greater German People's Party (GDVP), the treaty was tantamount to treason. The party had been hoping that Austria would, sooner or later, defy the Treaty of Saint-Germain and seek accession to the German Reich. The party had also been hoping that the unification of all Germans would extend to the Sudeten Germans, the German-speaking former Habsburg subjects living in Bohemia.

In the final days of December 1921, the GDVP staged protest rallies against the treaty all over the country. Protests were also organized by other pan-German groups, including the nascent Nazi Party. Adolf Hitler traveled from Munich to Vienna to rail against the treaty in front of some six hundred sympathizers, a notable early appearance.

== See also ==
- Hugo Portisch
- Austro-Czech Relations (DE)
