= National Council (Austria) =

Lower house of the Austrian Parliament

National Council Nationalrat
- 28th Legislative Period

Type
- Type: Lower house of the Austrian Parliament

History
- Founded: 10 November 1920
- Preceded by: Constituent National Assembly

Leadership
- President: Walter Rosenkranz (FPÖ) since 24 October 2024
- Second President: Peter Haubner (ÖVP) since 24 October 2024
- Third President: Doris Bures (SPÖ) since 24 October 2024

Structure
- Seats: 183
- Political groups: Government (109) ÖVP (51) SPÖ (41) NEOS (17) Opposition (74) FPÖ (57) Greens (16) Independent (1)

Elections
- Voting system: Open list proportional representation with a 4% electoral threshold
- Last election: 29 September 2024
- Next election: By 2029

Meeting place
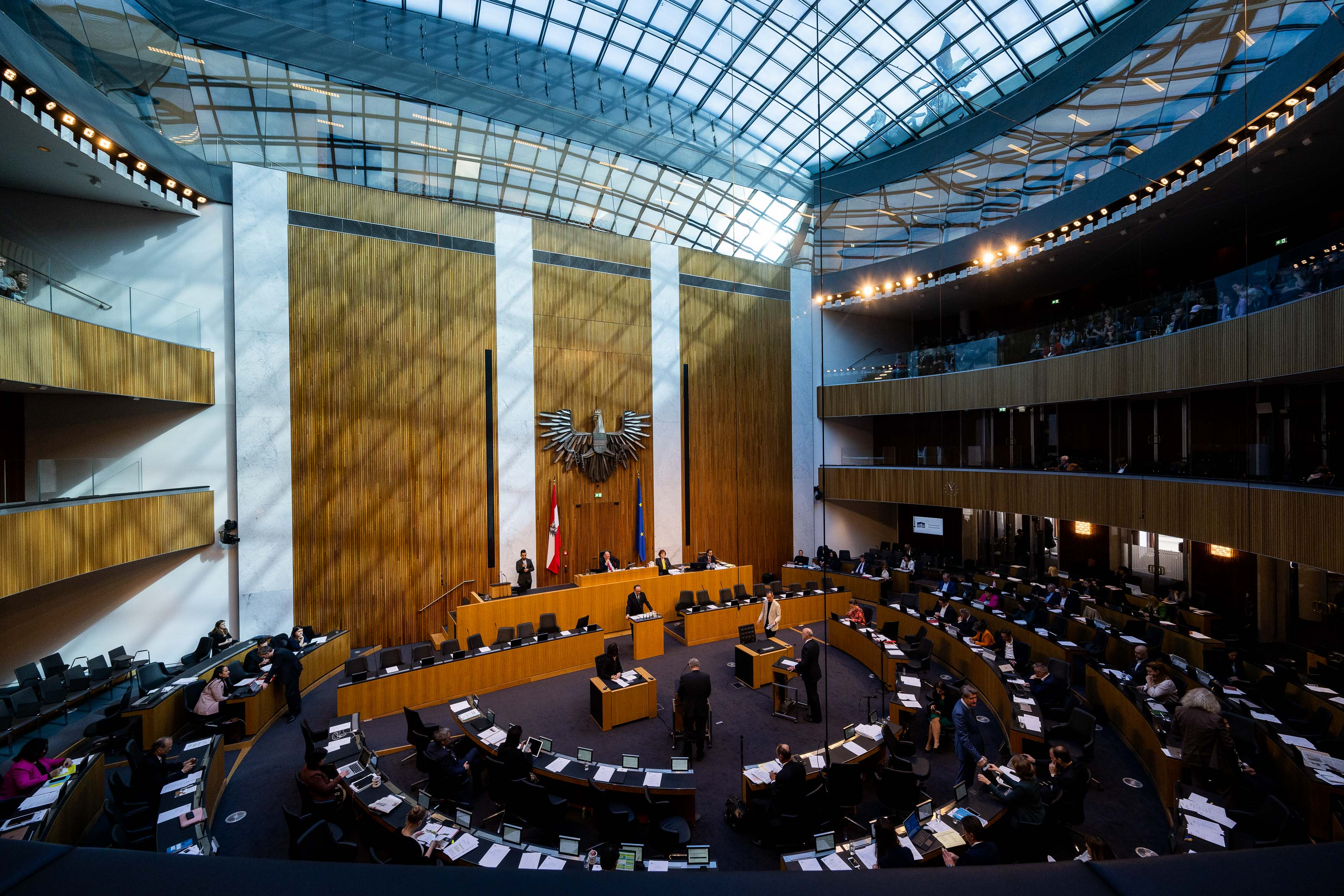
- Austrian Parliament Building, Vienna

Website
- parlament.gv.at

The National Council (Austrian German: Nationalrat, pronounced [nat͡si̯oˈnaːlˌʁaːt]) is one of the two houses of the Austrian Parliament and is frequently referred to as the lower house. The constitution endows the National Council with far more power than the Federal Council.

== Responsibilities ==
The National Council is where Austria's federal legislative authority is concentrated; for a bill to become federal law, it must be resolved upon by this chamber. Bills passed by the National Council are sent to the Federal Council for corroboration. If the Federal Council approves of the bill or simply does nothing for eight weeks, the bill has succeeded. If the Federal Council vetoes the bill, the National Council may still force it into law by essentially just passing it again; a National Council resolution overruling a Federal Council objection merely has to meet a higher quorum than a regular resolution. In other words, the Federal Council does not have any real power to prevent adoption of legislation, the National Council being easily able to override it. There are three exceptions to this rule:

- Constitutional laws or regulations limiting the competencies of the federal states
- Laws relating to the rights of the Federal Council itself
- Treaties concerning the jurisdiction of the federal states

The approval of the National Council is also required for most of the prerogatives of the Federal Assembly to be exercised. For example, motions to call for a referendum aimed at having the President removed from office by the electorate, and motions to declare war all need a two-thirds majority in the National Council. Only motions to impeach the President can also be from the Federal Council.

== Elections ==
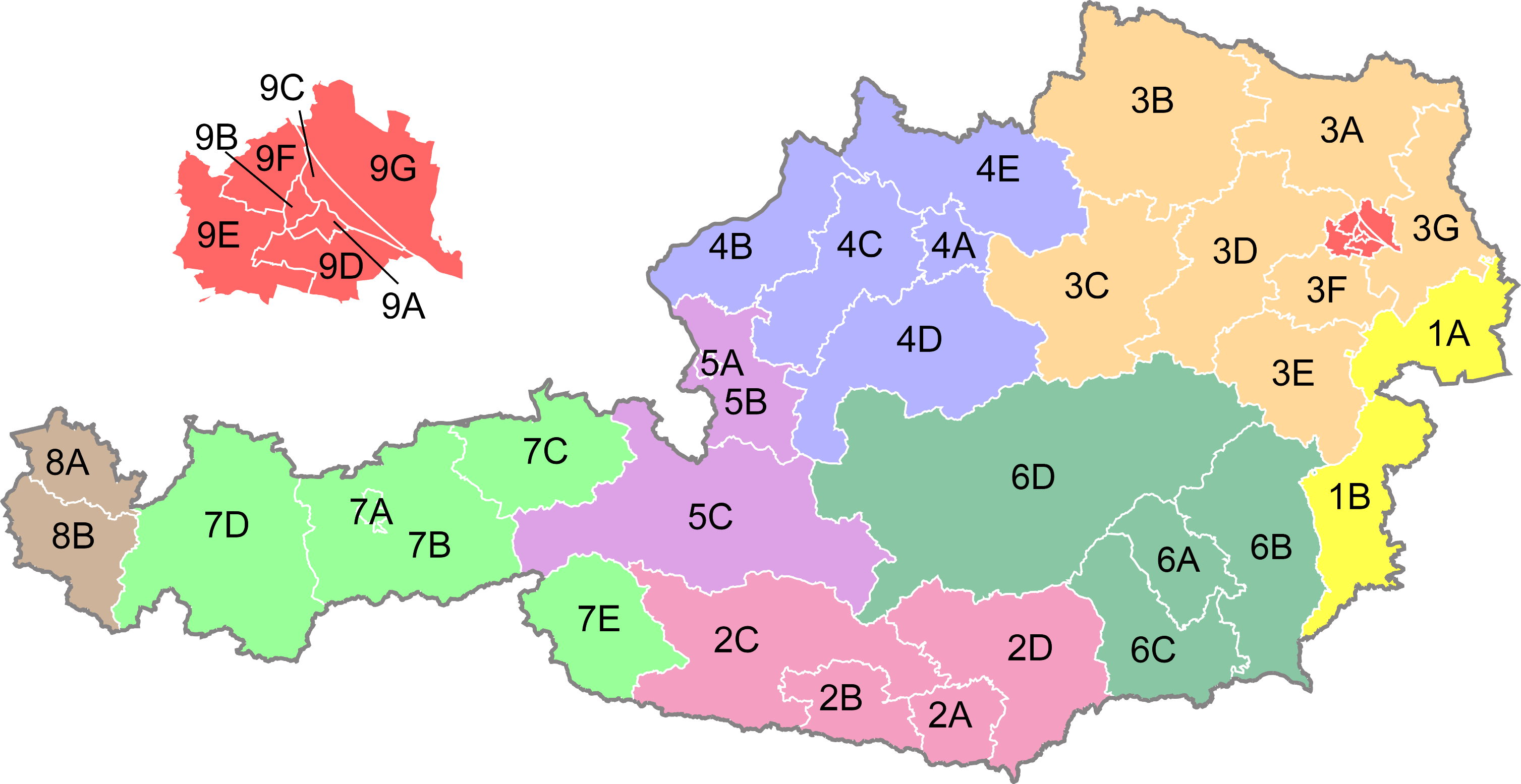
Regional constituencies in Austria. State constituencies are shown in colors.

The 183 members of the National Council are elected by nationwide popular vote for a term of five years; each Austrian sixteen years or older on the day the election takes place is entitled to one vote. National Council elections are general elections. The voting system aims at party-list proportional representation and uses partially open lists:

- For the purpose of National Council elections, the nine states of Austria constitute regional electoral districts. The nine regional electoral districts are subdivided into a total of 39 local electoral districts. Political parties submit separate ranked lists of candidates for each district, regional or local, in which they have chosen to run. They also submit a federal-level list.
- Votes cast are first counted within their local electoral districts. Since there are 39 local districts but 183 seats to fill, most local districts are multi-member districts. The number of seats assigned to each local district is based solely on electoral district population, as established by the most recent census; the partitioning and apportionment rules are simple enough to prevent gerrymandering from becoming an issue. The number of votes required to win one seat is simply the number of votes divided by the number of seats assigned to the district in question (ie the Hare quota). For example, if 150,000 votes are cast in a five-seat local district, it takes 30,000 votes to win one seat. If a party has scored 61,000 votes out of the 150,000 votes cast, it is entitled to two seats, to be taken by the first two candidates on the party's local district list. Since 60,000 votes would have been sufficient to win two seats, 1000 votes are left unaccounted for by this first round of tallying.
- Any vote not accounted for on the local level is dealt with on the regional level, provided that the party it has been cast for has obtained at least four percent of the regional total vote. The system is analogous to that used on the district level; the number of seats assigned to a regional district is simply the number of seats assigned to one of its constituent local districts but not filled during the first round of tallying.
- Any vote not accounted for on the regional level either is dealt with on the federal level, provided that the party it has been cast for has obtained at least four percent of the federal total vote. The D'Hondt method is used to allocate any National Council seats remaining to be filled.

In addition to voting for a party list, voters may express preference for one individual candidate in the same party list. This means it is not possible to simultaneously vote for the party list of one party but exert influence on the candidate rankings on the party list of another party. A candidate receiving sufficiently many personal votes can rise in rank on his or her district party list; voters thus have a certain degree of influence as to which particular individual wins which particular seat.

== Peculiarities ==
Austria's federal constitution defines Austria as a semi-presidential democracy: the executive branch of government is supposed to be headed by the President, but is also answerable to the National Council. In practice, however, nearly all of the day-to-day work of governing is left to the Chancellor and Cabinet, which are dependent on the confidence of the National Council. The President has the theoretical right to name anyone eligible to serve in the National Council as a minister or Chancellor. However, the National Council's right to sack a minister or the entire cabinet makes it all but impossible for Presidents to appoint a government entirely of their own choosing or keep it in office against the will of the National Council. While the President has the theoretical authority to dissolve a hostile National Council, constitutional convention prevents this power from being exercised.

Austria accordingly functions as a parliamentary democracy: for all intents and purposes, the cabinet is subject to approval by the National Council and is responsible to it, with the president being little more than a figurehead.

A related discrepancy between Austrian constitutional theory and Austrian political practice is that the constitution defines the President of the National Council to be Austria's second highest public official, junior only to the president proper. As a practical matter, however, the Chancellor, who nominally ranks third in the Austrian order of precedence, is the country's leading political figure. Thus, the President of the National Council is a representative of rather moderate significance: wielding less power than the president by extension means wielding less power than the Chancellor or even most federal ministers. The President of the National Council thus serves mostly as a moderator of parliamentary debate.

== Latest election ==
| Party | Votes | % | +/– | Seats | +/– |
|---|---|---|---|---|---|
| Freedom Party of Austria | 1,408,514 | 28.85 | +12.68 | 57 | +26 |
| Austrian People's Party | 1,282,734 | 26.27 | -11.19 | 51 | –20 |
| Social Democratic Party of Austria | 1,032,234 | 21.14 | -0.04 | 41 | +1 |
| NEOS | 446,378 | 9.14 | +1.04 | 18 | +3 |
| The Greens | 402,107 | 8.24 | -5.66 | 16 | –10 |
| Communist Party – KPÖ Plus | 116,891 | 2.39 | +1.70 | 0 | 0 |
| The Beer Party | 98,395 | 2.02 | +1.92 | 0 | 0 |
| Madeleine Petrovic List | 28,488 | 0.58 | New | 0 | New |
| Der Wandel | 27,830 | 0.57 | +0.11 | 0 | 0 |
| MFG Austria | 19,785 | 0.41 | New | 0 | New |
| Gaza List | 19,376 | 0.40 | New | 0 | New |
| The Yellows | 156 | 0.00 | New | 0 | New |
| Total | 4,882,888 | 100.00 | – | 183 | 0 |
| Valid votes | 4,882,888 | 99.05 | | | |
| Invalid/blank votes | 46,857 | 0.95 | | | |
| Total votes | 4,929,745 | 100.00 | | | |
| Registered voters/turnout | 6,346,059 | 77.68 | | | |
Source: Interior Ministry, ORF

=== Results by state ===
States shaded by the parties' result

| State | FPÖ | | ÖVP | | SPÖ | | NEOS | | Grüne | | Others | | Turnout |
| State | % | S | % | S | % | S | % | S | % | S | % | S | Turnout |
|---|---|---|---|---|---|---|---|---|---|---|---|---|---|
| Burgenland | 28.8 | 2 | 28.6 | 2 | 27.0 | 1 | 6.5 | - | 4.7 | - | 4.4 | - | 82.5 |
| Carinthia | 38.4 | 4 | 20.8 | 2 | 23.1 | 2 | 7.8 | - | 4.7 | - | 5.2 | - | 76.9 |
| Lower Austria | 29.2 | 10 | 29.9 | 11 | 20.2 | 7 | 8.5 | 3 | 6.7 | 2 | 5.5 | - | 82.0 |
| Upper Austria | 30.5 | 9 | 26.3 | 8 | 20.3 | 6 | 8.3 | 2 | 8.4 | 2 | 6.2 | - | 80.1 |
| Salzburg | 27.7 | 3 | 31.6 | 3 | 16.8 | 1 | 9.0 | - | 8.5 | - | 6.4 | - | 78.4 |
| Styria | 32.2 | 8 | 27.0 | 7 | 18.6 | 5 | 8.2 | 2 | 7.6 | 2 | 6.4 | - | 78.5 |
| Tyrol | 28.7 | 4 | 31.0 | 4 | 15.4 | 2 | 10.6 | 1 | 8.1 | 1 | 6.2 | - | 74.3 |
| Vorarlberg | 27.1 | 2 | 29.1 | 2 | 13.1 | 1 | 12.6 | 1 | 11.4 | - | 6.7 | - | 71.8 |
| Vienna | 20.7 | 6 | 17.4 | 5 | 29.9 | 9 | 11.4 | 3 | 12.3 | 4 | 8.3 | - | 71.9 |
| Nationwide | —N/a | 9 | —N/a | 7 | —N/a | 7 | —N/a | 6 | —N/a | 5 | —N/a | - | —N/a |
| Austria | 28.8 | 57 | 26.3 | 51 | 21.1 | 41 | 9.1 | 18 | 8.2 | 16 | 6.4 | - | 77.7 |
Source: Interior Ministry

== Historical composition of the National Council ==
=== 1919-1930 ===
| SDAPÖ / CS / German National Movement / GDVP / Landbund / National Economy Bloc (GDVP+Landbund) / Heimwehr / Others | | Total seats |
| 1919 | 72 / 69 / 26 / 3 | 170 |
| 1920 | 69 / 85 / 21 / 7 / 1 | 183 |
| 1923 | 68 / 82 / 10 / 5 | 165 |
| 1927 | 71 / 85 / 9 | 165 |
| 1930 | 72 / 66 / 19 / 8 | 165 |

=== Since 1945 ===
| KPÖ / SPÖ / GRÜNE / JETZT / LiF / NEOS / ÖVP / BZÖ / FRANK / VdU/FPÖ | | Total seats |
| 1945 | 4 / 76 / 85 | 165 |
| 1949 | 5 / 67 / 77 / 16 | 165 |
| 1953 | 4 / 73 / 74 / 14 | 165 |
| 1956 | 3 / 74 / 82 / 6 | 165 |
| 1959 | 78 / 79 / 8 | 165 |
| 1962 | 76 / 81 / 8 | 165 |
| 1966 | 74 / 85 / 6 | 165 |
| 1970 | 81 / 78 / 6 | 165 |
| 1971 | 93 / 80 / 10 | 183 |
| 1975 | 93 / 80 / 10 | 183 |
| 1979 | 95 / 77 / 11 | 183 |
| 1983 | 90 / 81 / 12 | 183 |
| 1986 | 80 / 8 / 77 / 18 | 183 |
| 1990 | 80 / 10 / 60 / 33 | 183 |
| 1994 | 65 / 13 / 11 / 52 / 42 | 183 |
| 1995 | 71 / 9 / 10 / 52 / 41 | 183 |
| 1999 | 65 / 14 / 52 / 52 | 183 |
| 2002 | 69 / 17 / 79 / 18 | 183 |
| 2006 | 68 / 21 / 66 / 7 / 21 | 183 |
| 2008 | 57 / 20 / 51 / 21 / 34 | 183 |
| 2013 | 52 / 24 / 9 / 47 / 11 / 40 | 183 |
| 2017 | 52 / 8 / 10 / 62 / 51 | 183 |
| 2019 | 40 / 26 / 15 / 71 / 31 | 183 |
| 2024 | 41 / 16 / 18 / 51 / 57 | 183 |

== Current composition of the National Council ==
| Group | Members | Leader |
|---|---|---|
| Freedom Party of Austria (FPÖ) | 57 / 183 | Herbert Kickl |
| Austrian People's Party (ÖVP) | 51 / 183 | Christian Stocker |
| Social Democratic Party of Austria (SPÖ) | 41 / 183 | Andreas Babler |
| NEOS – The New Austria and Liberal Forum (NEOS) | 18 / 183 | Beate Meinl-Reisinger |
| The Greens – The Green Alternative (GRÜNE) | 16 / 183 | Sigrid Maurer |
| No group affiliation | 0 / 183 | – |
Source: National Council

== See also ==
- List of presidents of the National Council of Austria
- Federal Assembly (Austria)
- Federal Council (Austria)
- Politics of Austria
- List of legislatures by country
