= 1930 Austrian legislative election =

← 1927	9 November 1930	1945 →

All 165 seats in the National Council 83 seats needed for a majority
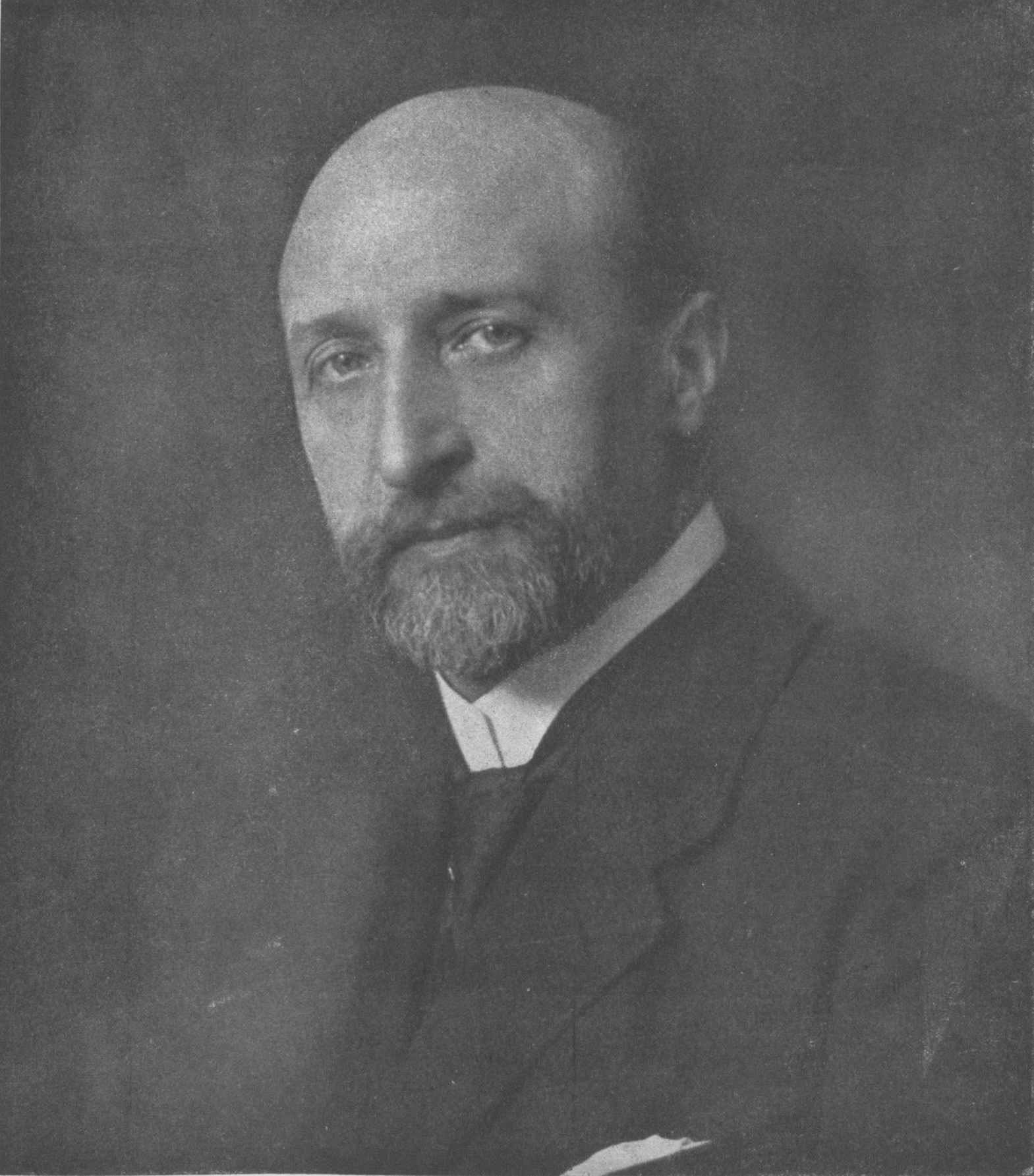

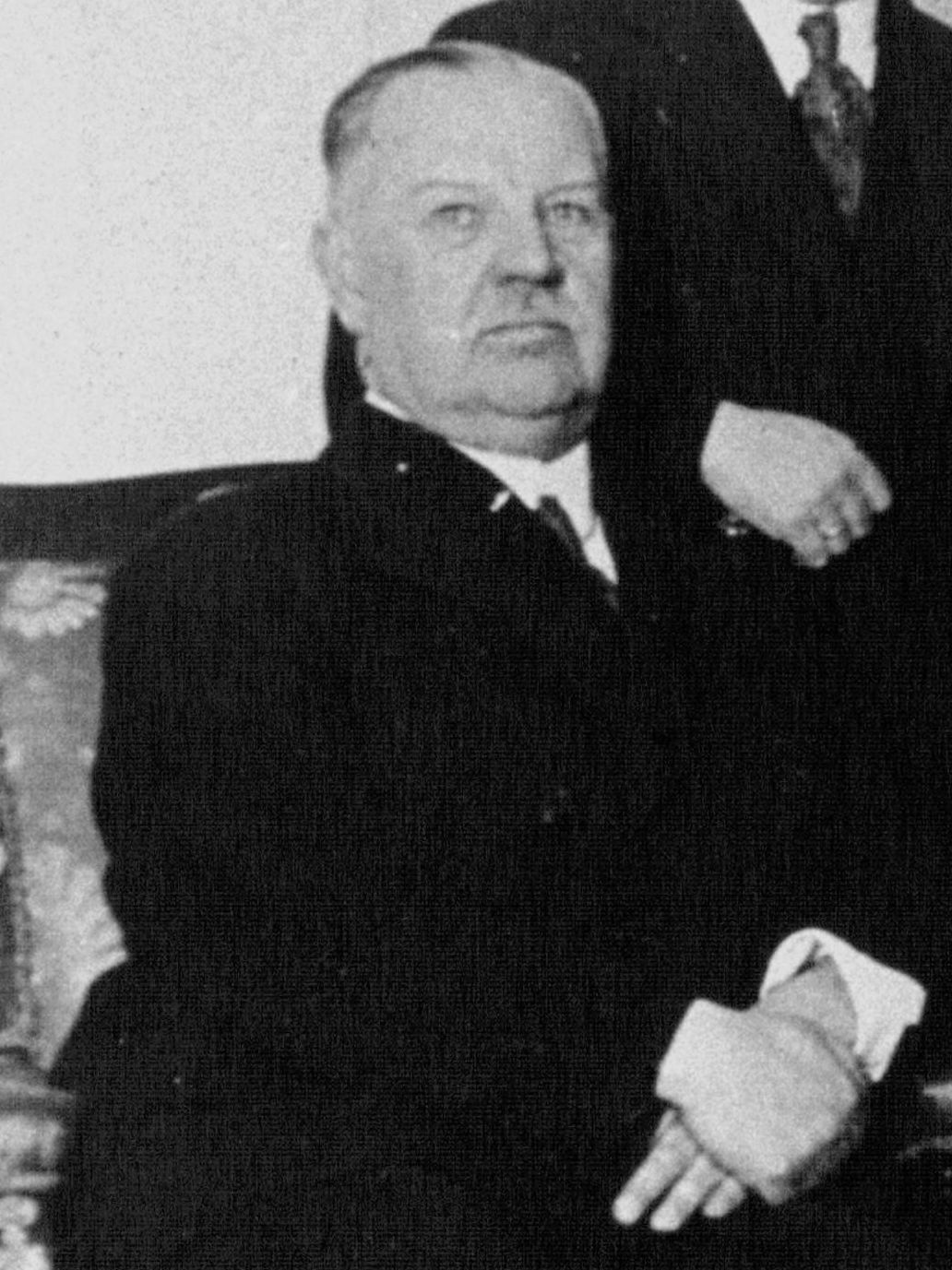

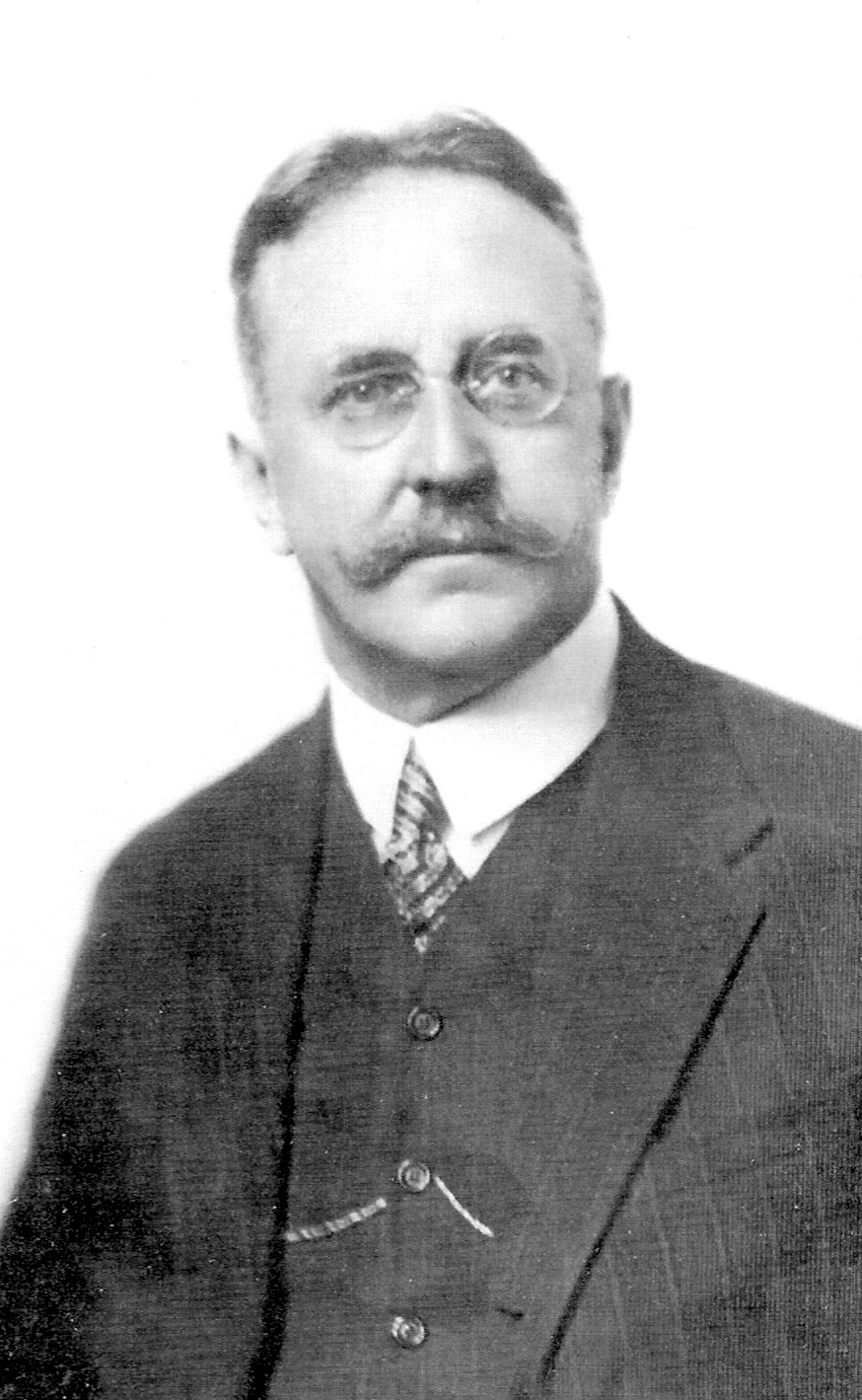

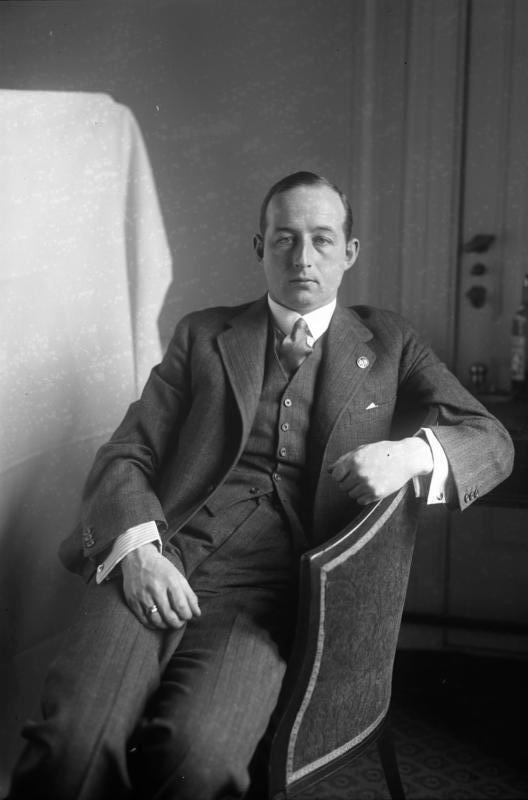
	First party	Second party
Leader	Karl Seitz	Karl Vaugoin
Party	SPÖ	CS
Last election	42.28%, 71 seats	48.24%, 85 (EL)
Seats won	72	66
Seat change	▲1	▼19
Popular vote	1,517,146	1,314,956
Percentage	41.14%	35.65%
Swing	▼1.14 pp	▼12.41 pp
	Third party	Fourth party
Leader	Franz Dinghofer	Ernst Rüdiger Starhemberg
Party	GDVP–LB	HB
Last election	6.32%, 9 (LB)	–
Seats won	19	8
Seat change	▲10	New
Popular vote	428,255	227,401
Percentage	11.61%	6.17%
Swing	▲5.28 pp	New
Chancellor before election
Karl Vaugoin
CS
Elected Chancellor
Otto Ender
CS

Parliamentary elections were held in Austria on 9 November 1930. The Social Democratic Workers' Party emerged as the largest faction in the National Council, with 72 of the 165 seats, but the Christian Social Party (with 66 seats) formed a new coalition government with Otto Ender as Chancellor. Voter turnout was 90%.

This was the last parliamentary election to take place in the period of the First Austrian Republic. A series of socialist-fascist clashes in 1934 was followed by the authoritarian Federal State of Austria and eventual Anschluss in 1938 with Nazi Germany.

== Results ==
Party	Votes	%	Seats	+/–
Social Democratic Workers' Party	1,517,146	41.14	72	+1
Christian Social Party	1,314,956	35.65	66	–
National Economy Bloc (GDVP–LB)	428,255	11.61	19	–
Homeland Bloc	227,401	6.17	8	New
German National Socialist Workers' Party	111,627	3.03	0	0
Landbund for Austria	43,689	1.18	0	–
Communist Party of Austria	20,951	0.57	0	0
Austrian People's Party (Note: Movement led by Irene Harrnd and Moriz Zalman)	14,980	0.41	0	New
Democratic Centre Party	6,719	0.18	0	New
Jewish List	2,133	0.06	0	New
Kaiser Loyalty People's Party	157	0.00	0	New
National Democratic Association	54	0.00	0	New
Total	3,688,068	100.00	165	0
Valid votes	3,688,068	99.24		
Invalid/blank votes	28,098	0.76		
Total votes	3,716,166	100.00		
Registered voters/turnout	4,121,282	90.17		
Source: Nohlen & Stöver

=== Results by province ===
Province	Votes	SDAPÖ	CS	GDVP–LB	HB	DNSAP	LB	KPÖ	ÖVP	DCP	JL	KLPP	NDA
Province	Votes	%	%	%	%	%	%	%	%	%	%	%	%
Vienna	1,192,672	58.98	23.72	10.43	2.21	2.31	0	0.89	0.71	0.56	0.18	0.01	0
Lower Austria	818,302	35.63	44.13	8.58	6.62	4.2	0	0.5	0.34	0	0	0	0
Upper Austria	479,285	28.37	45.42	7.29	8.29	2.41	7.71	0.25	0.27	0	0	0	0
Salzburg	123,152	29.96	41.52	12.69	5.73	3.69	5.49	0.61	0.30	0	0	0	0
Tyrol	176,843	21.99	54.97	12.34	9.28	1.24	0	0.17	0	0	0	0	0
Vorarlberg	77,516	20.92	56.79	20.94	0	1.14	0	0.22	0	0	0	0	0
Styria	510,164	34.38	32.52	16.51	12.48	3.42	0	0.39	0.31	0	0	0	0
Carinthia	175,640	38.73	22.54	22.38	8.47	6.90	0	0.66	0.32	0	0	0	0
Burgenland	134,494	37.75	41.23	16.01	3.80	0.75	0	0.47	0	0	0	0	0
Total	3,688,068	41.14	35.65	11.61	6.17	3.03	1.18	0.57	0.41	0.18	0.06	0.00	0.00
Source: Statistische Nachrichten : Sonderheft. Die Nationalratswahlen vom 9. November 1930, 12.
