= Greater German People's Party =

Greater German People's Party Großdeutsche Volkspartei
- Founded: 8 August 1920; 106 years ago
- Dissolved: May 1, 1934; 92 years ago
- Merger of: German-National Party; German People's Party
- Preceded by: German National Association
- Succeeded by: Austrian Nazi Party (de facto)
- Membership: 100,000 (1922 est.)
- Ideology: Austro–German nationalism National liberalism Pan-Germanism; Antisemitism
- Political position: Right-wing
- Electoral list: Einheitsliste (1923, 1927)
- Electoral alliance: Nationaler Wirtschaftsblock und Landbund (1930)
- Colours: Black Red Gold
- National Council (1920): 21 / 183

The Greater German People's Party (German Großdeutsche Volkspartei, abbreviated GDVP) was a German nationalist political party during the First Republic of Austria, established in 1920.

== Foundation ==
After World War I and the dissolution of Austria-Hungary, the German nationalist and "German-Liberal" camp, which was fragmented into many splinter parties and factions, formed the largest group in the Provisional National Assembly of German Austria with 102 representatives, ahead of the Socialists and the Catholic Christian Socials. In 1919, the 17 different groupings and clubs formed a federation, the Greater German Association (Großdeutsche Vereinigung), led by the former Linz mayor Franz Dinghofer. As delegate of the Provisional Assembly, Dinghofer was elected one of its three presidents on 21 October 1918, together with the Socialist Karl Seitz and the Christian Social politician Jodok Fink. Under his presidency, the assembly voted for the accession to the German Reich and declared German Austria a republic.

On a 1920 convention in Salzburg, the Greater German Association was transformed into a single party, the German nationalist and antisemitic Greater German People's Party. The only nationalist parties which did not join were the German Workers' Party and the rural Landbund. The party did not have a strong organisation but instead was supported by people who were nationalistic but not generally involved or interested in politics. The party received strong support from students, teachers and bureaucrats.

== Ideology ==
1923 election poster: "And if the world were full of devils! The German people must arise! Away from Internationalism! Vote Greater German!"

The party supported the creation of a Volksgemeinschaft or people's community. They called for the unification of Austria with Germany and free trade.

== Support ==
During the First Republic the party never won more than 17% in elections. However, from 1921 to 1932, it was the junior partner of the Austrian Federal Government, in a coalition with the Christian Social Party, providing the Vice-Chancellors in the cabinets of Johann Schober, Ignaz Seipel and Rudolf Ramek. From 1927, the similar oriented Landbund took the Greater Germans' position as coalition partner.

Chancellor Johann Schober (in office 1921–22, 1930–31), although not a party-member, was considered to be close to the German nationalists. With the rise in support for the Austrian Nazi Party in the early 1930s, the Greater German People's Party lost numerous members to the Nazis and the paramilitary Heimwehr forces. On 15 May 1933, the party's radicalised remnants formed an action group ("Kampfgemeinschaft") with the National Socialists and eventually merged with the Nazi party during 1933–34. With the implementation of the Austrofascist dictatorship of the Federal State of Austria in 1934, all parties were banned. Upon the 1938 Anschluss to Nazi Germany, many former members joined the German Nazi Party.

== Legacy ==
The Greater German People's Party represented the Austrian "Third Camp" (Drittes Lager) which traditionally has embraced pan-German nationalists and national liberals (in Austria "German-Liberals"). The Third Camp was revived after World War II in form of the Federation of Independents and later the Freedom Party of Austria.

== See also ==
- German nationalism in Austria
- Liberalism in Austria
