= Landbund =

- Founded: 1919
- Dissolved: 1 May 1934; 92 years ago
- Merged into: Fatherland Front
- Ideology: Agrarianism; National liberalism Austro–German nationalism Factions (1930s): Pro-Nazism; Anti-Nazism
- European affiliation: Green International
- Electoral alliance: Nationaler Wirtschaftsblock und Landbund (1930)

"Landbund" may also refer to the Agricultural League, a former political party of Germany.

The Landbund (English: Rural Federation) was an Austrian political party during the period of the First Republic (1918–1934).

== History ==
The Landbund was founded in 1919 as Deutschösterreichische Bauernpartei ("Party of German-Austrian Farmers") and represented liberal and Protestant farmers in Styria, Carinthia and Upper Austria. It endorsed a union of Austria with Germany and opposed Marxism, Austrofascism and the Heimwehr. In the 1920 parliamentary elections it was part of a German National coalition alongside the Greater German People's Party, and won seven seats.

It took part in coalition governments between 1927 and 1933 when the Vice Chancellor and the Minister of the Interior came from its ranks. From 1930 onwards, it allied with the Greater German People's Party (Großdeutsche Volkspartei) to create a common list for elections under the name Nationaler Wirtschaftsblock (National Economic Block), which was dissolved in 1934.

== Leading politicians ==
- Karl Hartleb (Vice Chancellor 1927–1930)
- Vinzenz Schumy (Governor of Carinthia 1923–1927)
- Franz Winkler (Vice Chancellor 1932/33)

== Legacy ==
After World War II, when a provisional Austrian government was created in 1945, the Landbund was originally supposed to nominate a member. However, the group was not recreated in the Second Republic. Most former Landbund supporters, who opposed Socialism and also the Catholicism of both the Christian Social Party during the First Republic and the Austrian People's Party during the Second Republic, found a new political home in the Verband der Unabhängigen and later in the Freedom Party of Austria, which is most strongly rooted in the same areas where the Landbund had been an important political force.

== See also ==
- Liberalism in Austria
