= List of ministers of economy (Austria) =

Minister of Digital and Economic Affairs
- Bundesministerin für Digitalisierung und Wirtschaftsstandort
- Coat of arms
- Ministry of Economy
- Style: Mrs. Federal minister (formal)
- Member of: Federal Government; Council of Ministers
- Nominator: Political parties
- Appointer: The president on advice of the chancellor
- Constituting instrument: Constitution of Austria
- First holder: Karl Urban in the first Republic (30 October 1918); Eduard Heinl in the second Republic
- Website: Official website Official website in German

The minister of digital and economic affairs of Austria heads the Ministry of Digital and Economic Affairs.

== Ministers ==
=== First Republic ===
№	Portrait	Name (Born-Died)	Term			Political Party	Government
№	Portrait	Name (Born-Died)	Took office	Left office (Note: Based on when the successor took office)	Duration	Political Party	Government
State Secretariat of Commerce and Industry (Staatsamt für Gewerbe, Industrie und Handel)
1	Karl Urban [de]	Karl Urban (1855–1940)	30 October 1918	15 March 1919	136 days	DSP	Renner I Cabinet
State Secretariat of Commerce, Industry and Construction (Staatsamt für Handel und Gewerbe, Industrie und Bauten)
2	Johann Zerdik [de]	Johann Zerdik (1878–1961)	15 March 1919	24 June 1920	1 year, 101 days	CS	Renner II Cabinet–II
-	Wilhelm Ellenbogen [de]	Wilhelm Ellenbogen (1863–1951); Acting	24 June 1920	7 July 1920	13 days	SDAPÖ	Renner III Cabinet
3	Eduard Heinl	Eduard Heinl (1880–1957)	7 July 1920	20 November 1920	136 days	CS	Mayr I Cabinet
Ministry of Commerce, Industry and Construction (Bundesministerium für Gewerbe, Industrie und Bauten)
(3)	Eduard Heinl	Eduard Heinl (1880–1957)	20 November 1920	21 June 1921	213 days	CS	Mayr II Cabinet
4	Alexander Angerer [de]	Alexander Angerer (1868–1938)	21 June 1921	7 October 1921	108 days	GDVP	Schober I Cabinet
5	Alfred Grünberger	Alfred Grünberger (1875–1935)	7 October 1921	31 May 1922	236 days	CS	Schober I Cabinet; Breisky Cabinet; Schober II Cabinet
6	Emil Kraft [de]	Emil Kraft (1865–1931)	31 May 1922	17 April 1923	321 days	GDVP	Seipel I Cabinet
Ministry of Commerce and Transport (Bundesministerium für Handel und Verkehr)
7	Hans Schürff [de]	Hans Schürff (1875–1939)	17 April 1923	26 September 1929	6 years, 162 days	GDVP	Seipel II–III; Ramek I Cabinet–II; Seipel IV–V; Streeruwitz Cabinet
8	Michael Hainisch	Michael Hainisch (1858–1940)	26 September 1929	17 June 1930	264 days	Independent	Schober III Cabinet
-	Johann Schober	Johann Schober (1874–1932); Acting	17 June 1930	20 June 1930	3 days	Independent	Schober III Cabinet
9	Friedrich Schuster [de]	Friedrich Schuster (1863–1932)	20 June 1930	30 September 1930	102 days	Independent	Schober III Cabinet
(3)	Eduard Heinl	Eduard Heinl (1880–1957)	30 September 1930	21 September 1932	1 year, 357 days	CS	Vaugoin Cabinet; Ender Cabinet; Buresch I Cabinet–II; Dollfuss I Cabinet
10	Guido Jakoncig [de]	Guido Jakoncig (1895–1972)	21 September 1932	10 May 1933	231 days	Heimatblock	Dollfuss II Cabinet
11	Friedrich Stockinger [de]	Friedrich Stockinger (1894–1968)	10 May 1933	3 November 1936	3 years, 177 days	VF	Dollfuss II Cabinet; Schuschnigg I Cabinet–II
12	Wilhelm Taucher [de]	Wilhelm Taucher (1892–1962)	3 November 1936	16 February 1938	1 year, 105 days	VF	Schuschnigg III Cabinet
13	Julius Raab	Julius Raab (1891–1964)	16 February 1938	11 March 1938	23 days	VF	Schuschnigg IV Cabinet
14	Hans Fischböck	Hans Fischböck (1895–1967)	11 March 1938	13 March 1938	2 days	NSDAP	Seyss-Inquart Cabinet

=== Second Republic ===
№	Portrait	Name (Born-Died)	Term			Political Party	Government
№	Portrait	Name (Born-Died)	Took office	Left office	Duration	Political Party	Government
State Secretariat of Industry, Commerce and Transport (Staatsamt für Industrie, Gewerbe, Handel und Verkehr)
1	Eduard Heinl	Eduard Heinl (1880–1957)	27 April 1945	20 December 1945	237 days	ÖVP	Renner IV Cabinet
Ministry of Commerce and Reconstruction (Bundesministerium für Handel und Wiederaufbau)
2	Eugen Fleischacker [de]	Eugen Fleischacker (1899–1953)	20 December 1945	31 May 1946	162 days	ÖVP	Figl I Cabinet
(1)	Eduard Heinl	Eduard Heinl (1880–1957)	31 May 1946	18 February 1948	1 year, 263 days	ÖVP	Figl I Cabinet
3	Ernst Kolb [de]	Ernst Kolb (1912–1978)	18 February 1948	23 January 1952	3 years, 339 days	ÖVP	Figl I Cabinet–II
4	Josef C. Böck-Greissau [de]	Josef C. Böck-Greissau (1893–1953)	23 January 1952	21 April 1953	1 year, 88 days	ÖVP	Figl II Cabinet–II; Raab I Cabinet
–	Julius Raab	Julius Raab (1891–1964); Acting	21 April 1953	28 April 1953	7 days	ÖVP	Raab I Cabinet
5	Udo Illig [de]	Udo Illig (1897–1989)	28 April 1953	19 September 1956	3 years, 144 days	ÖVP	Raab I Cabinet–II
6	Fritz Bock	Fritz Bock (1911–1993)	19 September 1956	19 April 1966	9 years, 212 days	ÖVP	Raab II Cabinet–II–III; Gorbach I Cabinet–II; Klaus I Cabinet
Ministry of Commerce and Industry (Bundesministerium für Handel und Industrie)
–	Fritz Bock	Fritz Bock (1911–1993); Acting	19 April 1966	19 January 1968	1 year, 275 days	ÖVP	Klaus II Cabinet
7	Otto Mitterer [de]	Otto Mitterer (1911–1994)	19 January 1968	21 April 1970	2 years, 92 days	ÖVP	Klaus II Cabinet
8	Josef Staribacher	Josef Staribacher (1921–2014)	21 April 1970	24 May 1983	13 years, 33 days	SPÖ	Kreisky I Cabinet–II–III–IV
–	Norbert Steger	Norbert Steger (born 1944); Acting	24 May 1983	21 January 1987	3 years, 242 days	FPÖ	Sinowatz Cabinet; Vranitzky I Cabinet
9	Robert Graf [de]	Robert Graf (1929–1996)	21 January 1987	1 April 1987	70 days	ÖVP	Vranitzky II Cabinet
Ministry of Economy (Bundesministerium für Wirtschaft)
9	Robert Graf [de]	Robert Graf (1929–1996)	1 April 1987	24 April 1989	2 years, 23 days	ÖVP	Vranitzky II Cabinet
10	Wolfgang Schüssel	Wolfgang Schüssel (born 1945)	24 April 1989	4 May 1995	6 years, 10 days	ÖVP	Vranitzky II Cabinet–II–III
11	Johannes Ditz [de]	Johannes Ditz (born 1951)	4 May 1995	19 July 1996	1 year, 76 days	ÖVP	Vranitzky IV Cabinet–II
12	Johann Farnleitner [de]	Johann Farnleitner (born 1939)	19 July 1996	4 February 2000	3 years, 200 days	ÖVP	Vranitzky V Cabinet; Klima Cabinet
13	Martin Bartenstein	Martin Bartenstein (born 1953)	4 February 2000	1 April 2000	57 days	ÖVP	Schüssel I Cabinet
Ministry of Economy and Labor (Bundesministerium für Wirtschaft und Arbeit)
13	Martin Bartenstein	Martin Bartenstein (born 1953)	1 April 2000	2 December 2008	8 years, 245 days	ÖVP	Schüssel I Cabinet–II; Gusenbauer Cabinet
14	Reinhold Mitterlehner	Reinhold Mitterlehner (born 1955)	2 December 2008	1 February 2009	61 days	ÖVP	Faymann I Cabinet
Ministry of Economy, the Family and Youth (Bundesministerium für Wirtschaft, Familie und Jugend)
14	Reinhold Mitterlehner	Reinhold Mitterlehner (born 1955)	1 February 2009	1 March 2014	5 years, 28 days	ÖVP	Faymann I Cabinet–II
Ministry of Science, Research and Economy (Bundesministerium für Wissenschaft, Forschung und Wirtschaft)
14	Reinhold Mitterlehner	Reinhold Mitterlehner (born 1955)	1 March 2014	17 May 2016	2 years, 77 days	ÖVP	Faymann II Cabinet
15	Harald Mahrer [de]	Harald Mahrer (born 1973)	17 May 2016	18 December 2017	1 year, 215 days	ÖVP	Kern Cabinet
16	Margarete Schramböck	Margarete Schramböck (born 1970)	18 December 2017	8 January 2018	21 days	ÖVP	Kurz I Cabinet
Ministry of Digital and Economic Affairs (Bundesministerium für Digitalisierung und Wirtschaft)
16	Margarete Schramböck	Margarete Schramböck (born 1970)	8 January 2018	3 June 2019	1 year, 146 days	ÖVP	Kurz I Cabinet
17	Elisabeth Udolf-Strobl	Elisabeth Udolf-Strobl (born 1956)	3 June 2019	7 January 2020	218 days	Independent	Bierlein Cabinet
(16)	Margarete Schramböck	Margarete Schramböck (born 1970)	7 January 2020	11 May 2022	6 years, 243 days	ÖVP	Kurz II Cabinet; Schallenberg Cabinet; Nehammer Cabinet
18	Martin Kocher	Martin Kocher (born 1973)	11 May 2022	Incumbent	4 years, 119 days	ÖVP	Nehammer Cabinet

== See also ==
- Ministry of Economy (Austria)
- Ministry of Finance (Austria)
