= Ministry of Labour (Austria) =

Government ministry of Austria

Federal Ministry of Labour
- Bundesministerium für Arbeit
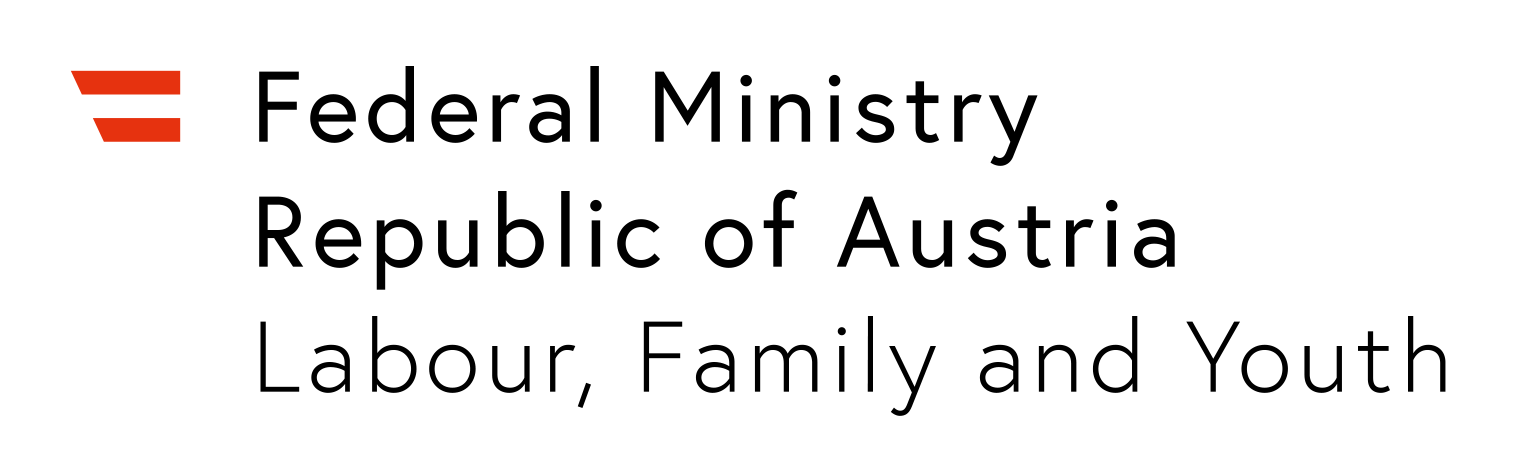

Ministry overview
- Formed: 2020
- Jurisdiction: Austria
- Headquarters: Untere Donaustraße 13–15; Vienna
- Minister responsible: Wolfgang Hattmannsdorfer
- Website: bmafj.gv.at

The Ministry of Labour and Economy is a ministry of the Government of Austria. From January 2020 to January 2021, the ministry was officially called the Federal Ministry of Labour, Family and Youth (Bundesministerium für Arbeit, Familie und Jugend). The current Minister of Labour is Martin Kocher, who has served in the role in the Second Kurz government and the Schallenberg government since January 2020.
