= Margarete Schramböck =

Austrian manager and politician (born 1970)

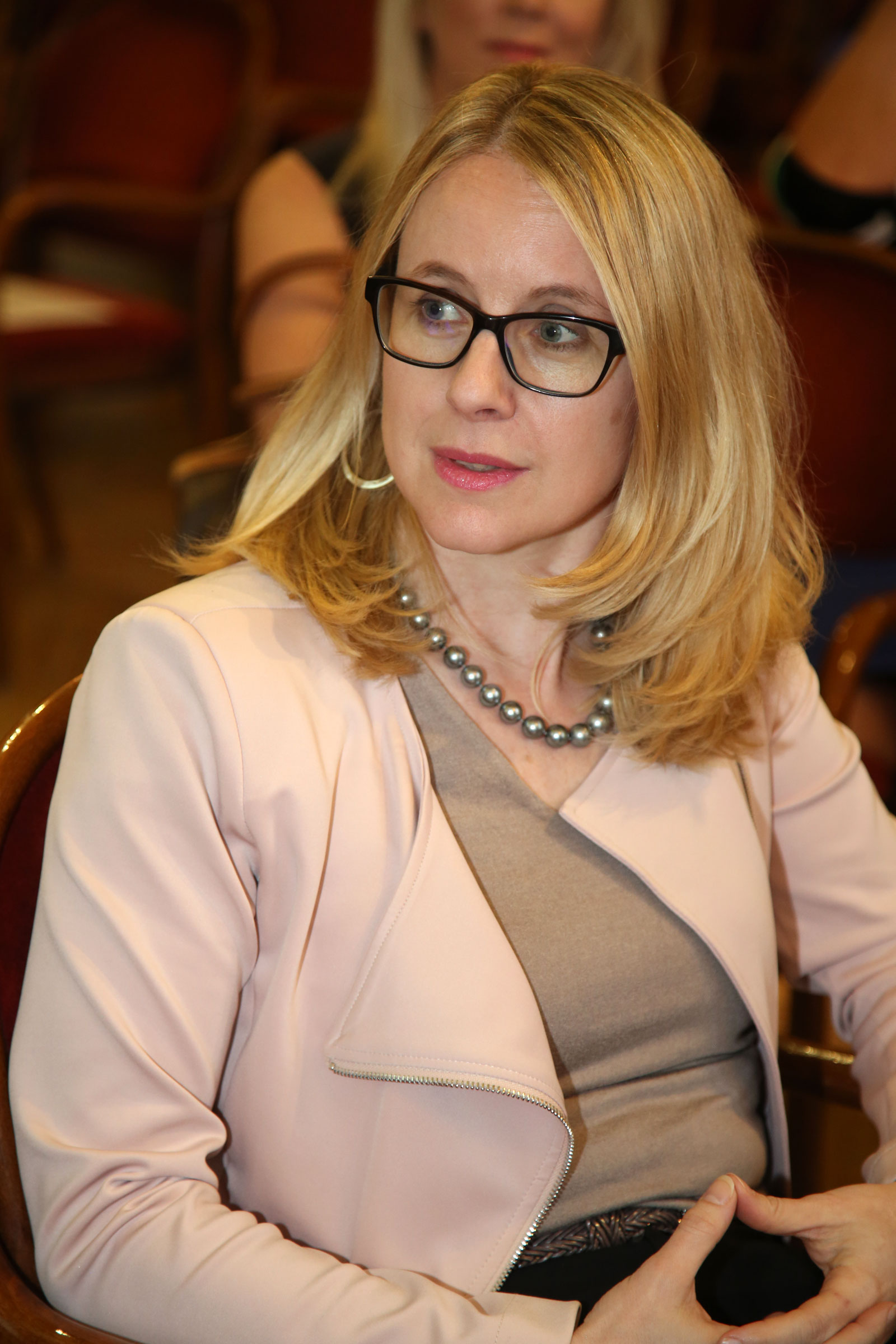
- Schramböck in 2015

Minister of Digital and Economic Affairs
- In office 7 January 2020 – 11 May 2022
- Chancellor: Sebastian Kurz; Alexander Schallenberg; Karl Nehammer
- Preceded by: Elisabeth Udolf-Strobl
- Succeeded by: Martin Kocher
- In office 18 December 2017 – 3 June 2019
- Chancellor: Sebastian Kurz
- Preceded by: Josef Moser
- Succeeded by: Elisabeth Udolf-Strobl

Personal details
- Born: 12 May 1970 (age 56) St. Johann in Tirol, Tyrol, Austria
- Party: People's Party
- Education: Vienna University of Economics

Margarete Schramböck (born 12 May 1970) is an Austrian business manager and politician who served as minister of digital and economic affairs in the Second Kurz government, the Schallenberg government and the Nehammer government from January 2020 to May 2022; she previously served in this position from December 2017 to June 2019 in the First Kurz government. From May 2016 to October 2017, she was the chief executive officer of A1 Telekom Austria. Schramböck is a member of the Austrian People's Party.

== Early life and education ==
Schramböck was born on 12 May 1970 in St. Johann in Tirol. She attended gymnasium in St. Johann, graduating in 1989.

Schramböck acquired a master's degree in social and economic sciences (Mag. rer. soc. oec.) from the Vienna University of Economics and Business in 1994, graduating with a master's thesis on the international diamond market. She obtained a doctorate in social and economic sciences (Dr. rer. soc. oec.) from the same school in 1997 with a dissertation on the future of business consulting. She went on to enroll at the University of Lyon, graduating with an MBA in 1999.

== Career in the private sector ==
Starting in 1995, Schramböck had been working for Alcatel-Lucent in various capacities. From 1995 to 1997, she was Auditor for Central and Eastern Europe. In 1997, she moved into the company's E Business wing, serving as the Head of Asset Management from 1997 and as the Service Director for Austria from 1999. In 2000, she became the founding executive director of NextIraOne Austria. From 2008 to 2011 she was also in charge of NextIraOne Germany. When the company was taken over by Dimension Data in 2014, Schramböck stayed on board as the managing director of Dimension Data Austria.

On 1 May 2016 Schramböck became the head of A1 Telekom Austria, one of the country's largest telecommunications providers, taking over from Alejandro Plater and his interim successor, Hannes Ametsreiter. Her term was originally meant to last five years. On 17 October 2017, coincidentally just two days after the 2017 Austrian legislative elections, A1 confirmed that Schramböck was being pushed out. Marcus Grausam, the CTO, assumed her responsibilities on an interim basis.

== Political career ==
Although not a member of any political party at the time, Schramböck was a close confidante of Johanna Mikl-Leitner, a former minister of the interior for the People's Party. Schramböck was tapped as a potential minister almost immediately and joined the People's Party within weeks of her dismissal.

When Chancellor Sebastian Kurz and his cabinet took office on 18 December 2017, Schramböck became the new minister of science, research and economy. On the same day, Schramböck announced that she would be joining the Tyrol party presidium. Following a reshuffling of ministerial responsibilities − a move regularly made by new parliamentary majority leaders − Schramböck was appointed minister of digital and economic affairs on 8 January 2018.

In addition to her role on the national level, Schramböck has been serving as chair of the EPP European Affairs Ministers Meeting, which gathers the center-right EPP ministers ahead of meetings of the Council of the European Union.

== Personal life ==
Schramböck lives in Sankt Andrä-Wördern, a town near Vienna in Lower Austria.

== Awards ==
- 2017: Tyrolean of the Year
- 2017: Vienna University of Economics and Business Manager of the Year
