= Bierlein government =

Government of Austria from 2019 to 2020

- 32nd Cabinet of Austria

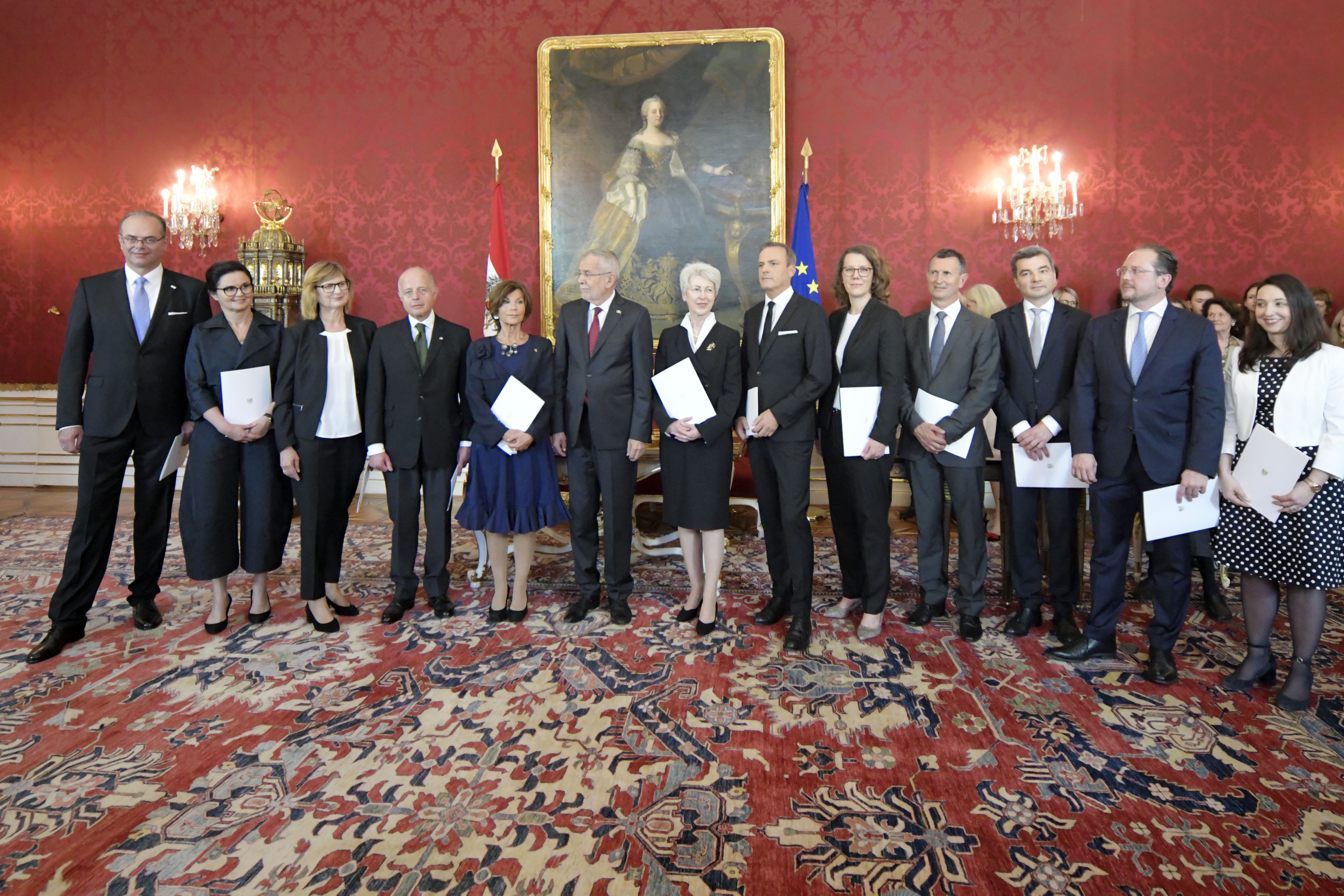
- Date formed: 3 June 2019
- Date dissolved: 7 January 2020

People and organisations
- Appointed by: Alexander Van der Bellen
- Chancellor: Brigitte Bierlein
- Vice-Chancellor: Clemens Jabloner (until October 2019)
- No. of ministers: 12
- Status in legislature: Technocratic cabinet

History
- Predecessor: First Kurz government
- Successor: Second Kurz government

The Bierlein government (German: Bundesregierung Bierlein) was the 32nd Government of Austria following the collapse of the First Kurz government headed by Chancellor Sebastian Kurz in the aftermath of the Ibiza affair. Sworn in on 3 June 2019, the Bierlein government was the first purely technocratic government in Austrian history, first new government after a successful motion of no confidence in Parliament and first government headed by a female chancellor. As head of government, Brigitte Bierlein was assisted by Clemens Jabloner as vice-chancellor.

The cabinet was officially dissolved on 7 January 2020 and succeeded by the Second Kurz government, in which The Greens replaced the Freedom Party as the People's Party's junior coalition partner. Both newly-installed government parties have gained support at the expense of the People's Party's previous coalition partners in the 2019 legislative election.

== Background ==
The First Kurz government was a coalition government between the conservative Austrian People's Party (ÖVP) and the right-wing Freedom Party of Austria (FPÖ). In May 2019, following the Ibiza affair, vice chancellor and Freedom Party leader Heinz-Christian Strache and his deputy, Johann Gudenus, both resigned from all of their offices. People's Party Chancellor Sebastian Kurz called for new elections. However, Kurz petitioned Federal President Alexander Van der Bellen to additionally remove the controversial FPÖ Minister of the Interior, Herbert Kickl, from office. This prompted all other FPÖ ministers to resign from their ministries as well.

As a result, the Kurz I government was no longer supported by a majority of the members of the National Council, and was removed in republican Austria's first successful vote of no confidence. President Van der Bellen appointed Brigitte Bierlein, then head of the Constitutional Court, as interim chancellor. Following the Austrian constitution, she then picked the rest of the ministers, subject to the president's approval.

== Significance ==
While Austria has a directly elected president who is legally allowed to appoint anybody he sees fit as Chancellor, the National Council's ability to pass a motion of no confidence means that Austrian governments effectively still require confidence and supply, like in purely parliamentary democracies. Even though coalition governments have, in the past, often failed, they usually remained in office until the next government was elected and appointed. A technocratic government was sometimes mentioned as a possible alternative to partisan coalition governments, but beyond the occasional appointment of independent experts to select ministries, the idea was dismissed as unrealistic due to aforementioned confidence requirements.

The removal of Sebastian Kurz from office marked the first time in the history of Austria that a successful motion of no confidence was passed against an entire government at once. President Van der Bellen was forced to appoint a new government, but there were no other feasible coalitions, and the new election date was already set for late September. With votes from the opposition, including the ousted Freedom Party, it was even moved to a later date than what was proposed by Kurz' People's Party. It was therefore not a surprise when Van der Bellen, again for the first time in Austria, used his powers to appoint an independent chancellor.

Bierlein was the first chancellor not affiliated with either one of the major parties, the Austrian People's Party and the Social Democratic Party of Austria. She was also the first female chancellor, and the first independent chancellor, to have been appointed following a successful motion of no confidence.

== Composition ==
The cabinet consists of:

Portfolio	Minister	Took office	Left office	Party
Federal Chancellery
Federal Chancellor	Brigitte Bierlein	3 June 2019	7 January 2020	Independent
Vice-Chancellor and Minister for Justice	Clemens Jabloner	3 June 2019	7 January 2020	Independent
Ministers
Federal Minister of Finance & Civil Service and Sport	Eduard Müller	3 June 2019	7 January 2020	Independent
Federal Minister for Sustainability and Tourism	Maria Patek	3 June 2019	7 January 2020	Independent
Federal Minister for the Interior	Wolfgang Peschorn	3 June 2019	7 January 2020	Independent
Federal Minister for Education, Science and Research	Iris Eliisa Rauskala	3 June 2019	7 January 2020	Independent
Federal Minister for Transport, Innovation and Technology	Andreas Reichhardt	3 June 2019	7 January 2020	Independent
Federal Minister for Europe, Integration and Foreign Affairs	Alexander Schallenberg	3 June 2019	(Retained position in Kurz II Cabinet)	Independent
Federal Minister for Defence	Thomas Starlinger	3 June 2019	7 January 2020	Independent
Federal Minister within the Chancellery for Women, Families and Youth	Ines Stilling	3 June 2019	7 January 2020	Independent
Federal Minister for Digital and Economic Affairs	Elisabeth Udolf-Strobl	3 June 2019	7 January 2020	Independent
Federal Minister for Labour, Social Affairs, Health and Consumer Protection	Brigitte Zarfl	3 June 2019	7 January 2020	Independent
