= Minister of Labour (Austria) =

The Minister of Labour (German: Arbeitsminister) is a position in the Government of Austria. Since 2020, the minister has led the Federal Ministry of Labour.

== List of ministers ==
- Christine Aschbacher, in the Second Kurz government.
- Martin Kocher, in the Second Kurz government and the Schallenberg government.
- Martin Kocher, in the Nehammer government
