= Minister of Foreign Affairs (Austria) =

Minister for foreign affairs in Austria

- Bundesministerium für europäische und internationale Angelegenheiten
- Coat of arms

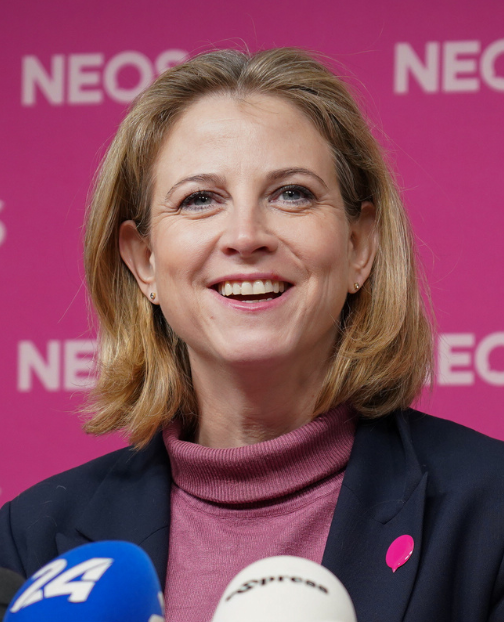
- Incumbent; Beate Meinl-Reisinger since 3 March 2025
- Ministry of Foreign Affairs
- Style: Mr. Federal minister (formal)
- Member of: Federal Government; Council of Ministers; Foreign Affairs Council
- Seat: Ministry of Foreign Affairs, Minoritenplatz, Innere Stadt, Vienna
- Nominator: Political parties
- Appointer: The president; on advice of the chancellor
- Constituting instrument: Constitution of Austria
- Precursor: Imperial and Royal Minister of Foreign Affairs
- First holder: Viktor Adler in the Republic of German-Austria (30 October 1918); Karl Renner; In the first Republic (21 October 1919); Karl Gruber; In the second republic (26 September 1945)
- Website: www.bmeia.gv.at (in English) www.bmeia.gv.at (in German)

This article lists the ministers of foreign affairs of Austria, from 30 October 1918 up to today. During the time of the Anschluss to Nazi Germany from 1938 to 1945, Austria had no government in its own right. The current Austrian foreign minister is Beate Meinl-Reisinger, who took office on the 3rd of March 2025.

== List of officeholders (1918–present) ==
=== Foreign ministers of Austria during the Interwar period ===
No.	Portrait	Foreign Minister	Took office	Left office	Time in office	Party	Cabinet
1	Victor Adler	Victor Adler (1852–1918)	30 October 1918	11 November 1918	12 days	SDAPÖ	Renner I
2	Otto Bauer	Otto Bauer (1881–1938)	21 November 1918	26 July 1919	247 days	SDAPÖ	Renner I–II
3	Karl Renner	Karl Renner (1870–1950)	26 July 1919	22 October 1920	1 year, 88 days	SDAPÖ	Renner II–III; Mayr I
4	Michael Mayr	Michael Mayr (1864–1922)	22 October 1920	21 June 1921	242 days	CS	Mayr I–II
5	Johannes Schober	Johannes Schober (1874–1932)	21 June 1921	26 January 1922	219 days	Independent	Schober I
6	Walter Breisky	Walter Breisky (1871–1944)	26 January 1922	27 January 1922	1 day	CS	Breisky
7	Leopold Hennet [de]	Leopold Hennet (1876–1950)	27 January 1922	31 May 1922	124 days	Independent	Schober II
8	Alfred Grünberger	Alfred Grünberger (1875–1935)	31 May 1922	20 November 1924	2 years, 173 days	CS	Seipel I–II–III
9	Heinrich Mataja	Heinrich Mataja (1877–1937)	20 November 1924	15 January 1926	1 year, 56 days	CS	Ramek I
10	Rudolf Ramek	Rudolf Ramek (1881–1941)	15 January 1926	20 October 1926	278 days	CS	Ramek II
11	Ignaz Seipel	Ignaz Seipel (1876–1932)	20 October 1926	4 May 1929	2 years, 196 days	CS	Seipel IV–V
12	Ernst Streeruwitz	Ernst Streeruwitz (1874–1952)	4 May 1929	26 September 1929	145 days	CS	Streeruwitz
(5)	Johannes Schober	Johannes Schober (1874–1932)	26 September 1929	30 September 1930	1 year, 4 days	Independent	Schober III
(11)	Ignaz Seipel	Ignaz Seipel (1876–1932)	30 September 1930	4 December 1930	65 days	CS	Vaugoin
(5)	Johannes Schober	Johannes Schober (1874–1932)	4 December 1930	29 January 1932	1 year, 56 days	Independent	Ender; Buresch I
13	Karl Buresch	Karl Buresch (1878–1936)	29 January 1932	20 May 1932	112 days	CS	Buresch II
14	Engelbert Dollfuss	Engelbert Dollfuss (1892–1934)	20 May 1932	10 July 1934	2 years, 51 days	CS; VF	Dollfuss I–II
15	Stephan Tauschitz	Stephan Tauschitz (1889–1970)	10 July 1934	3 August 1934	24 days	Landbund; VF	Dollfuss II; Schuschnigg I
16	Egon Berger-Waldenegg [de]	Egon Berger-Waldenegg (1880–1960)	3 August 1934	14 May 1936	1 year, 285 days	VF	Schuschnigg I
17	Kurt Schuschnigg	Kurt Schuschnigg (1897–1977)	14 May 1936	11 July 1936	58 days	VF	Schuschnigg II
18	Guido Schmidt	Guido Schmidt (1901–1957)	11 July 1936	11 March 1938	1 year, 243 days	VF	Schuschnigg III–IV
19	Wilhelm Wolf [de]	Wilhelm Wolf (1897–1939)	11 March 1938	13 March 1938	2 days	NSDAP	Seyss-Inquart Cabinet

Austria annexed by Nazi Germany in 1938 (see Austria within Nazi Germany for details). Independence restored in 1945.

=== Foreign ministers of Austria after the end of World War II ===
No.	Portrait	Foreign Minister	Took office	Left office	Time in office	Party	Cabinet
1	Karl Gruber	Karl Gruber (1909–1995)	26 September 1945	26 November 1953	8 years, 61 days	ÖVP	Renner IV Cabinet; Figl I Cabinet–II–III; Raab I Cabinet
2	Leopold Figl	Leopold Figl (1902–1965)	26 November 1953	9 June 1959	5 years, 195 days	ÖVP	Raab I Cabinet–II
3	Bruno Kreisky	Bruno Kreisky (1911–1990)	9 June 1959	19 April 1966	6 years, 314 days	SPÖ	Raab III–IV; Gorbach I Cabinet–II; Klaus I Cabinet
4	Lujo Tončić-Sorinj	Lujo Tončić-Sorinj (1915–2005)	19 April 1966	19 January 1968	1 year, 275 days	ÖVP	Klaus II Cabinet
5	Kurt Waldheim	Kurt Waldheim (1918–2007)	19 January 1968	21 April 1970	2 years, 92 days	ÖVP	Klaus II Cabinet
6	Rudolf Kirchschläger	Rudolf Kirchschläger (1915–2000)	21 April 1970	24 June 1974	4 years, 64 days	Independent	Kreisky I Cabinet–II
7	Erich Bielka	Erich Bielka (1908–1992)	24 June 1974	30 September 1976	2 years, 98 days	Independent	Kreisky II–III
8	Willibald Pahr	Willibald Pahr (born 1930)	30 September 1976	24 May 1983	6 years, 236 days	Independent	Kreisky III–IV
9	Erwin Lanc	Erwin Lanc (1930–2025)	24 May 1983	10 September 1984	1 year, 109 days	SPÖ	Sinowatz Cabinet
10	Leopold Gratz	Leopold Gratz (1929–2006)	10 September 1984	16 June 1986	1 year, 279 days	SPÖ	Sinowatz Cabinet
11	Peter Jankowitsch	Peter Jankowitsch (born 1933)	16 June 1986	21 January 1987	219 days	SPÖ	Vranitzky I Cabinet
12	Alois Mock	Alois Mock (1934–2017)	21 January 1987	4 May 1995	8 years, 103 days	ÖVP	Vranitzky II–III–IV
13	Wolfgang Schüssel	Wolfgang Schüssel (born 1945)	4 May 1995	4 February 2000	4 years, 276 days	ÖVP	Vranitzky IV–V; Klima Cabinet
14	Benita Ferrero-Waldner	Benita Ferrero-Waldner (born 1948)	4 February 2000	20 October 2004	4 years, 259 days	ÖVP	Schüssel I Cabinet–II
15	Ursula Plassnik	Ursula Plassnik (born 1956)	20 October 2004	2 December 2008	4 years, 43 days	ÖVP	Schüssel II Cabinet; Gusenbauer Cabinet
16	Michael Spindelegger	Michael Spindelegger (born 1959)	2 December 2008	16 December 2013	5 years, 14 days	ÖVP	Faymann I Cabinet
17	Sebastian Kurz	Sebastian Kurz (born 1986)	16 December 2013	18 December 2017	4 years, 2 days	ÖVP	Faymann II Cabinet; Kern Cabinet
18	Karin Kneissl	Karin Kneissl (born 1965)	18 December 2017	3 June 2019	1 year, 167 days	Independent	Kurz I Cabinet
19	Alexander Schallenberg	Alexander Schallenberg (born 1969)	3 June 2019	11 October 2021	2 years, 130 days	ÖVP	Bierlein Cabinet; Kurz II Cabinet
20	Michael Linhart	Michael Linhart (born 1958)	11 October 2021	6 December 2021	56 days	ÖVP	Schallenberg Cabinet
(19)	Alexander Schallenberg	Alexander Schallenberg (born 1969)	6 December 2021	3 March 2025	4 years, 279 days	ÖVP	Nehammer Cabinet
21	Beate Meinl-Reisinger	Beate Meinl-Reisinger (born 1978)	3 March 2025	Incumbent	1 year, 192 days	NEOS	Stocker Cabinet

== See also ==
- Foreign relations of Austria
- List of diplomatic missions of Austria
- List of foreign ministers of Austria-Hungary
