= Schallenberg government =

Government of Austria in 2021

- 34th Cabinet of Austria

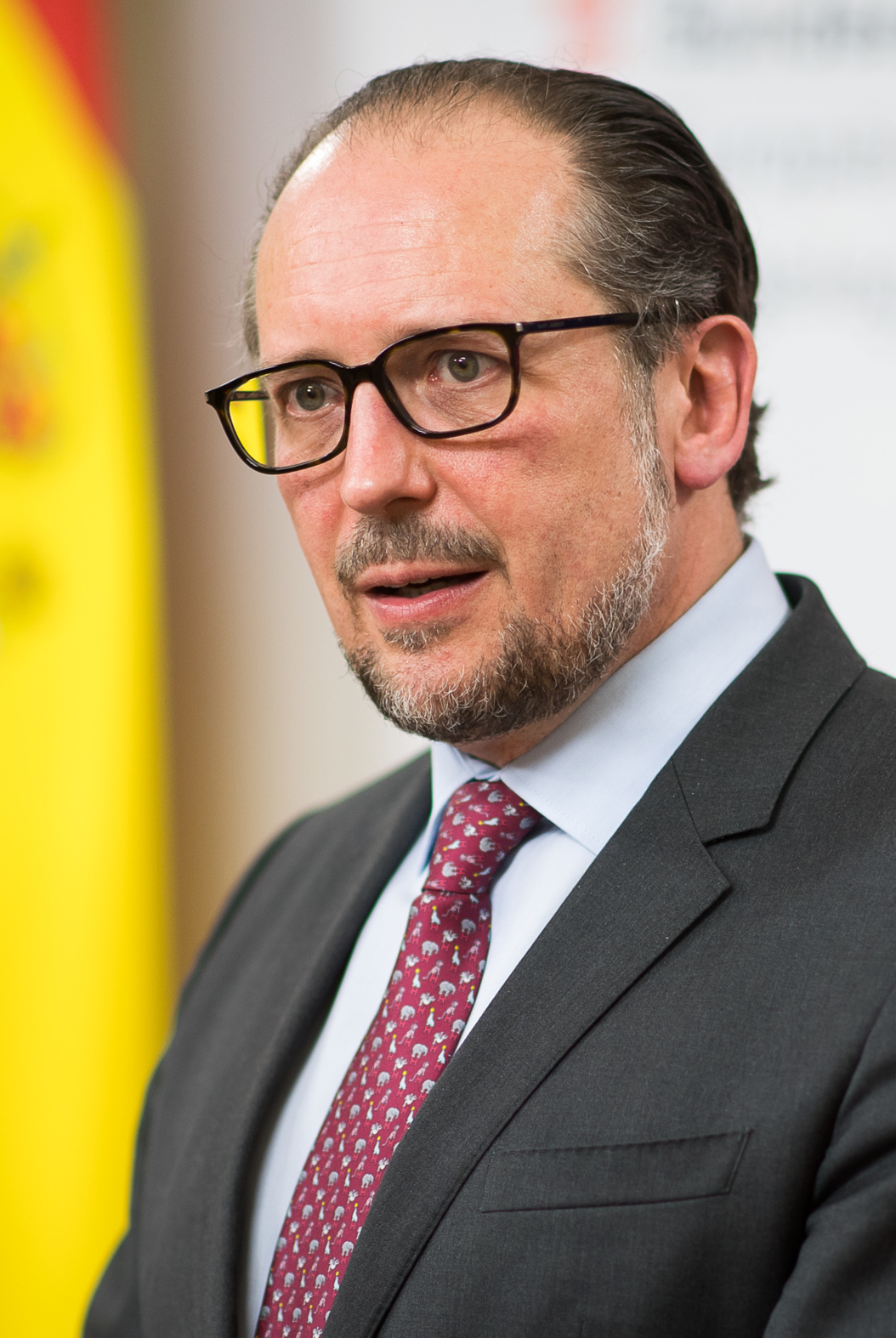
- Schallenberg in 2021
- Date formed: 11 October 2021
- Date dissolved: 6 December 2021

People and organisations
- Appointed by: Alexander Van der Bellen
- Chancellor: Alexander Schallenberg
- Vice-Chancellor: Werner Kogler
- Member parties: Austrian People's Party (ÖVP); The Greens
- Status in legislature: Majority (coalition)
- No. of ministers: 15
- Opposition parties: Social Democratic Party of Austria (SPÖ); Freedom Party of Austria (FPÖ); NEOS
- Opposition leader: Pamela Rendi-Wagner

History
- Election(s): 2019 legislative election
- Predecessor: Second Kurz government
- Successor: Nehammer government

The Schallenberg government (German: Bundesregierung Schallenberg) was sworn in as the 34th Government of Austria on 11 October 2021.

When Sebastian Kurz announced his resignation on 9 October 2021, the Austrian People's Party proposed to continue the coalition with The Greens with Alexander Schallenberg as chancellor. The Schallenberg government was sworn in by the president Alexander Van der Bellen on 11 October 2021.

== Composition ==
The cabinet consisted of:

| Portrait | Name | Office | Took office | Left office | Party | Federal Home State |
=== Chancellery ===
| | Alexander Schallenberg | Chancellor of Austria (Note: Also responsible for Media agendas) | 11 October 2021 | 6 December 2021 | ÖVP | (Born abroad) |
| | Werner Kogler | Vice-Chancellor of Austria; Minister for Arts, Culture, the Civil Service and Sport | 7 January 2020 | | Greens | Styria |
=== Chancellery ministers ===
| | Susanne Raab | Chancellery minister for Women and Integration | 7 January 2020 | | ÖVP | Upper Austria |
| | Susanne Raab | Minister for Women, Family, Youth and Integration | 1 February 2021 | | ÖVP | Upper Austria |
| | Karoline Edtstadler | Chancellery minister for the EU and Constitution | 7 January 2020 | | ÖVP | Salzburg |
=== Ministers ===
| | Gernot Blümel | Minister of Finance | 7 January 2020 | 6 December 2021 | ÖVP | Vienna |
| | Heinz Faßmann | Minister of Education, Science, and Research | 7 January 2020 | 6 December 2021 | Independent (ÖVP nominated) | (Born abroad) |
| | Leonore Gewessler | Minister of Climate Action, Environment, Energy, Mobility, Innovation and Technology (Note: The ministry also holds the agenda responsibilities of Infrastructure.) | 7 January 2020 | | Greens | Styria |
| | Martin Kocher | Minister of Labour | 11 January 2021 | | ÖVP | Salzburg |
| | Elisabeth Köstinger | Minister of Agriculture, Regions, and Tourism | 7 January 2020 | | ÖVP | Carinthia |
| | Michael Linhart | Minister for European and International Affairs | 11 October 2021 | 6 December 2021 | ÖVP | (Born abroad) |
| | Wolfgang Mückstein | Minister of Social Affairs, Health, Care, and Consumer Protection | 19 April 2021 | | Greens | Vienna |
| | Karl Nehammer | Minister of the Interior | 7 January 2020 | 6 December 2021 | ÖVP | Vienna |
| | Margarete Schramböck | Minister of Digital and Economic Affairs | 7 January 2020 | | ÖVP | Tyrol |
| | Klaudia Tanner | Minister of Defence | 7 January 2020 | | ÖVP | Lower Austria |
| | Alma Zadić | Minister of Justice | 7 January 2020 | | Greens | (Born abroad) |
=== State secretaries ===
| | Magnus Brunner | State secretary in the Ministry for Climate Action, Environment, Energy, Mobility, Innovation and Technology | 7 January 2020 | 6 December 2021 | ÖVP | Vorarlberg |
| | Andrea Mayer | State secretary in the Ministry for Arts, Culture, the Civil Service and Sport | 20 May 2020 | | Independent (Greens nominated) | Lower Austria |

== See also ==
- Politics of Austria
