= Second Kurz government =

Second chancellorship of Sebastian Kurz, January 2020 to October 2021

Second Kurz Government
- 33rd Cabinet of Austria

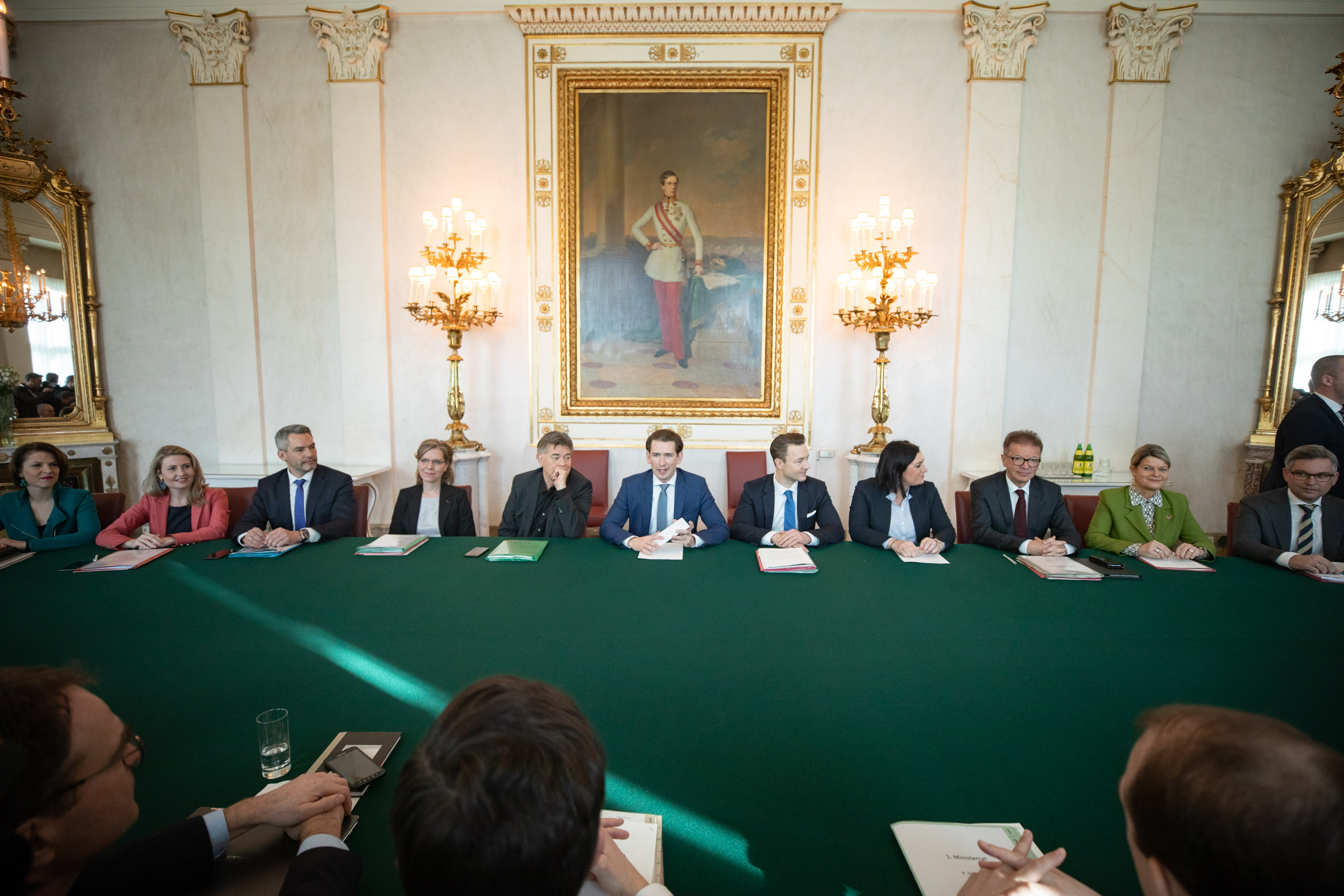
- Date formed: 7 January 2020
- Date dissolved: 11 October 2021

People and organisations
- Appointed by: Alexander Van der Bellen
- Chancellor: Sebastian Kurz
- Vice-Chancellor: Werner Kogler
- Member parties: Austrian People's Party (ÖVP); The Greens (GRÜNE)
- Status in legislature: Majority coalition
- No. of ministers: 15
- Opposition parties: Social Democratic Party of Austria (SPÖ); Freedom Party of Austria (FPÖ); NEOS
- Opposition leader: Pamela Rendi-Wagner

History
- Election(s): 2019 legislative election
- Predecessor: Bierlein government
- Successor: Schallenberg government

The Second Kurz government (German: Zweite Bundesregierung Kurz or Kurz II for short) was the 33rd government of Austria. Led by Sebastian Kurz as chancellor and Werner Kogler as vice-chancellor, it was sworn in by President Alexander Van der Bellen on 7 January 2020. It was officially dissolved and succeeded by the Schallenberg government on 11 October 2021.

This government represented many firsts. Headed by a former chancellor who had been ousted in a parliamentary vote of no confidence and made a comeback by winning the 2019 legislative election, it marked an alliance of a centre-right Austrian People's Party (ÖVP) with the centre-left The Greens as junior partner in the national government; it was the only such coalition in Europe until June 2020. It also featured a majority of female cabinet members. Chancellor Kurz himself was the youngest member of his own government and the youngest chief executive of any of the European Union's member states for the second time. The new political alliance was closely watched in Europe, especially in neighbouring Germany, as it could become the prototype for a new type of politics in which ascendant conservatives make common cause with green parties to tackle climate change, which has become a salient concern of voters.

The Second Kurz government succeeded the Bierlein government, a nonpartisan caretaker administration installed on 3 June 2019 to run Austria following the collapse of the First Kurz government in the wake of the Ibiza affair involving its coalition partner, the far-right Freedom Party (FPÖ). The termination of the coalition of Kurz's party with the FPÖ was followed by a vote of no confidence in Parliament and snap election in which voter support for the FPÖ dropped sharply and support for the Greens surged to nearly 14%, its highest level ever. The ÖVP emerged victorious with 37% of the popular vote. Although the ÖVP won the election, it did not achieve a parliamentary majority in the National Council and therefore had to look for a junior coalition partner.

== History ==
=== Demographics ===
The Second Kurz government was the first government in Austrian history in which women constitute the majority; it was also the youngest on average. Sebastian Kurz reclaimed the distinction of being the youngest head of government in Europe, aged 33. The youthfulness of the government also mirrored a younger electorate, Austria having lowered the voting age to 16, the lowest in Europe.

The Second Kurz government included one cabinet member who is not a native Austrian, but came to the country as a refugee when she was a child, an element of personal biography she shares with President Alexander Van der Bellen.

=== Unprecedented coalition ===
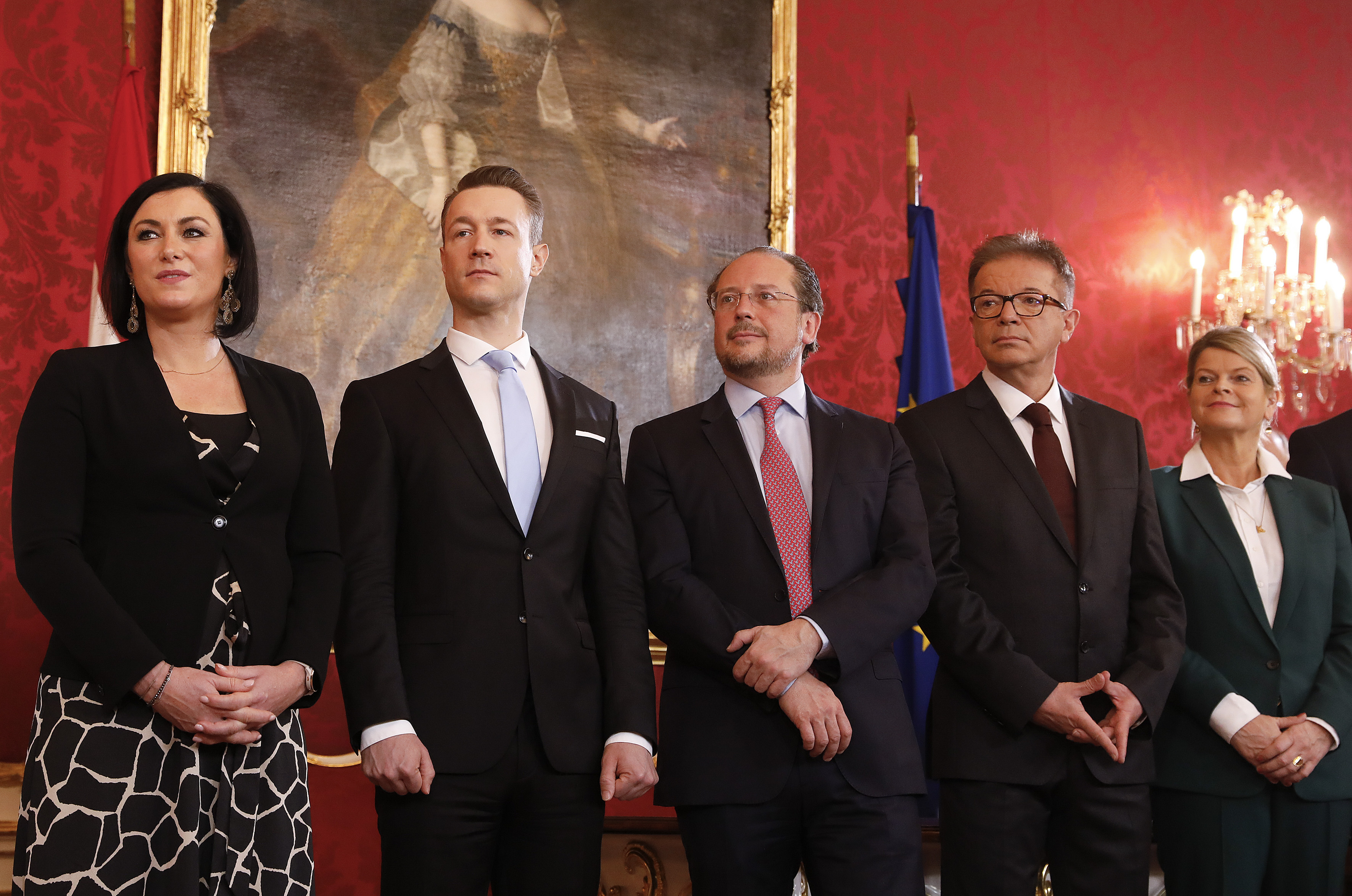
The newly appointed ministers at the president's residence, the Hofburg on 7 January 2020

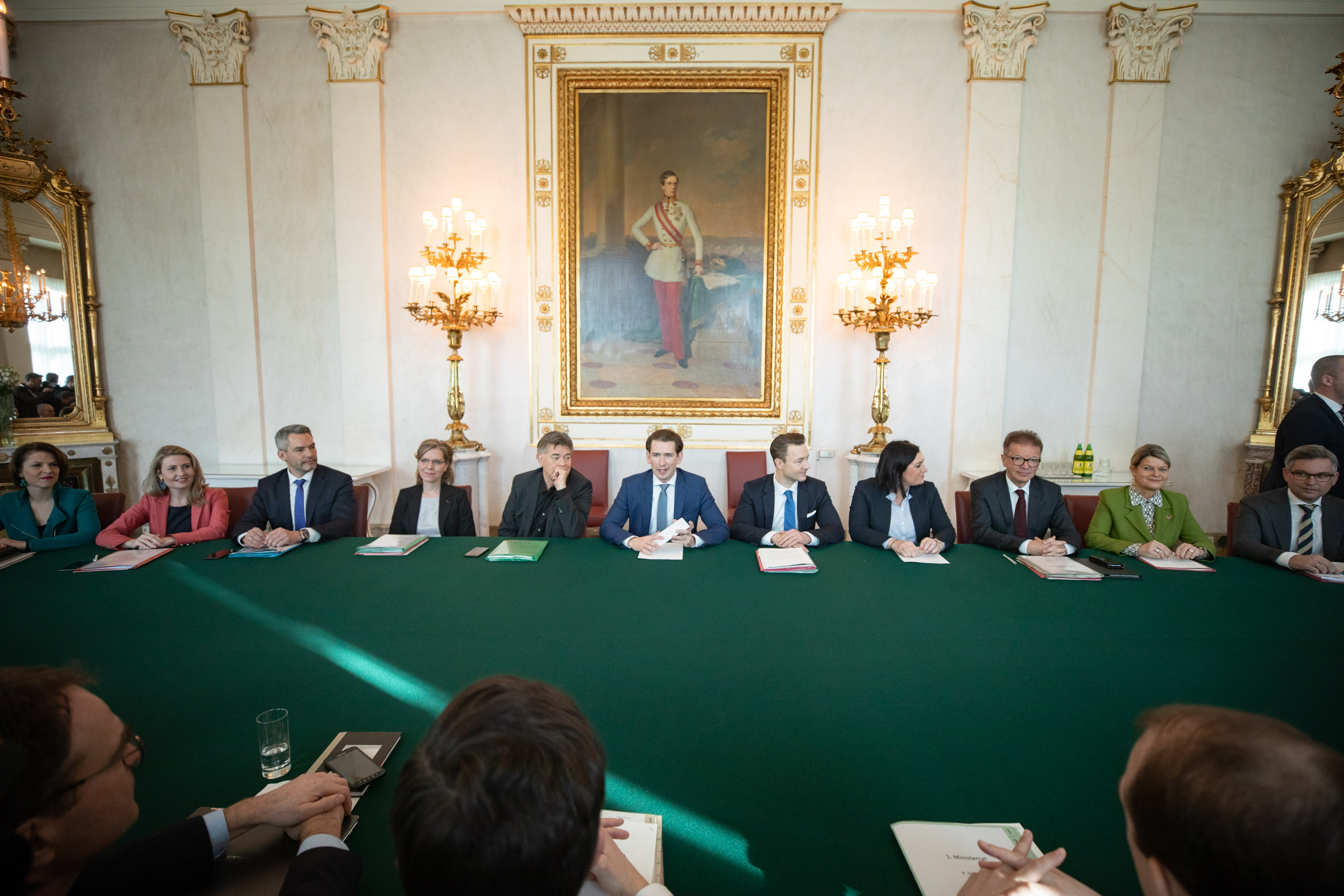
Council of ministers on 8 January 2020

Sebastian Kurz, chairman of the People's Party, reached an agreement on a coalition with the centre-left Greens at the end of 2019, putting him on track to become chancellor of Austria for the second time, with Werner Kogler, leader of The Greens, as vice-chancellor. This marked a breakthrough for The Greens as they would be represented in the executive branch of government at the national level for the first time. The Greens had previously unsuccessfully participated in coalition talks at the national level and served as coalition partners in several state governments.

The novel form of the political partnership paved the way for the ÖVP to maintain its conservative line on immigration, but also put Austria on the forefront of the fight against climate change, with a Green minister in charge of that portfolio and an action plan towards carbon neutrality on a pace faster than the rest of the EU. Kurz and Kogler differed not only in age, but also in style and manner of speech. Notwithstanding the odd-couple nature of the match, they have developed a good working relationship. Unlike Kurz, Kogler had to obtain the approval of his rank and file to enter the coalition government on the terms spelled out in the formal coalition agreement that the two party leaders had finalised and announced on New Year's Day. This was required by the charter of The Greens, which reflects its founders' commitment to grassroots democracy, while the ÖVP is more hierarchical and dominated by its constituent organisations in the corporatist tradition.

On 4 January 2020, more than 93 percent of the delegates at a special Green Congress convened in Salzburg backed the deal hammered out by the negotiating teams of the two parties and their leaders in more than two months of bargaining that covered the full spectrum of public policies, rather than just environmental issues. In the floor debate, misgivings were expressed about too many concessions having been made in reaching a deal on a joint government programme that both parties and their respective supporters in the electorate can agree on. Some delegates expressed dissent in the areas of civil liberties and treatment of asylum seekers and migrants. They deplored the Greens' yielding on core humanitarian principles.

In recognition of internal party dissension, Kogler stressed on many occasions the need to practice political realism. Assuming responsibility for governing the country with the ÖVP offered the Greens an opportunity to participate directly in the shaping of the future course of public policy for the very first time. "When if not now?" Kogler proclaimed, under a banner highlighting the spirit and motto of the congress: "Facing the future with boldness". He expressed hope to set an example for the rest of Europe with green and conservative parties working together in the national interest, as opposed to remaining merely on the sidelines as an opposition party in Parliament. In a separate floor vote, the Green rank and file approved the slate of Green ministers already designated unanimously by the party's expanded executive committee, with only one vote against and one abstention.

== Composition ==
The cabinet consists of:

Portrait	Name	Office	Took office	Left office	Party	Federal Home State
=== Chancellery ===
	Sebastian Kurz	Chancellor of Austria (Note: Also responsible for Media agendas)	7 January 2020	11 October 2021	ÖVP	Vienna
	Werner Kogler	Vice-Chancellor of Austria; Minister for Arts, Culture, the Civil Service and Sport	7 January 2020		Greens	Styria
=== Chancellery ministers ===
	Karoline Edtstadler	Chancellery minister for the EU and Constitution	7 January 2020		ÖVP	Salzburg
	Susanne Raab	Chancellery minister for Women and Integration	7 January 2020		ÖVP	Upper Austria
=== Ministers ===
	Karl Nehammer	Minister of the Interior	7 January 2020	6 December 2021	ÖVP	Vienna
	Alexander Schallenberg	Minister for European and International Affairs	7 January 2020	11 October 2021	ÖVP	(Born abroad)
	Alma Zadić	Minister of Justice	7 January 2020		Greens	(Born abroad)
	Rudolf Anschober	Minister of Social Affairs, Health, Care, and Consumer Protection	7 January 2020	13 April 2021	Greens	Upper Austria
	Wolfgang Mückstein	Minister of Social Affairs, Health, Care, and Consumer Protection	19 April 2021		Greens	Vienna
	Christine Aschbacher	Minister of Labour, Family and Youth	7 January 2020	9 January 2021	ÖVP	Styria
	Martin Kocher	Minister of Labour, Family and Youth	11 January 2021		ÖVP	Salzburg
	Klaudia Tanner	Minister of Defence	7 January 2020		ÖVP	Lower Austria
	Heinz Faßmann	Minister of Education, Science, and Research	7 January 2020	6 December 2021	Independent (ÖVP nominated)	(Born abroad)
	Leonore Gewessler	Minister of Climate Action, Environment, Energy, Mobility, Innovation and Technology (Note: The ministry also holds the agenda responsibilities of Infrastructure.)	7 January 2020		Greens	Styria
	Elisabeth Köstinger	Minister of Agriculture, Regions, and Tourism	7 January 2020		ÖVP	Carinthia
	Margarete Schramböck	Minister of Digital and Economic Affairs	7 January 2020		ÖVP	Tyrol
	Gernot Blümel	Minister of Finance	7 January 2020	6 December 2021	ÖVP	Vienna
=== State secretaries ===
	Magnus Brunner	State secretary in the Ministry for Climate Action, Environment, Energy, Mobility, Innovation and Technology	7 January 2020	6 December 2021	ÖVP	Vorarlberg
	Ulrike Lunacek	State secretary in the Ministry for Arts, Culture, the Civil Service and Sport	7 January 2020	20 May 2020	Greens	Lower Austria
	Andrea Mayer	State secretary in the Ministry for Arts, Culture, the Civil Service and Sport	20 May 2020		Independent (Greens nominated)	Lower Austria

== Actions ==
Under the People's Party, The Greens coalition plans, Austria will aim to become carbon neutral by 2040, a decade earlier than an EU-wide target, a pledge for all electricity to come from renewable sources by 2030, as well as more spending on public transport. The coalition deal also includes banning the headscarf in schools for girls up to age 14, an extension of the garment ban that applies until age 10 approved by lawmakers earlier this year. The agreement also revives a plan for “precautionary detention” of potentially dangerous asylum seekers.

== See also ==
- Politics of Austria
