= Alfred Schaefer =

Alfred Schaefer (30 January 1905 – 8 September 1986) was a Swiss banker who served as President of the Union Bank of Switzerland (now UBS). He earned a doctorate in law from the University of Zürich in 1930, and worked for the Union Bank of Switzerland from 1931. He was a member of the management committee from 1941 to 1963 and became president of the bank in 1953. From 1964 to 1976 he was president of its supervisory board. Schaefer was one of the 20th century's main leaders of UBS. He was the maternal grandfather of the Chancellor of Austria, Alexander Schallenberg.
