= Second Renner government =

Renner II
- 2nd Government of Austria

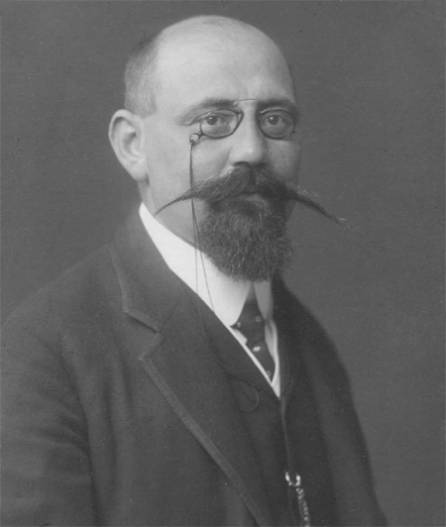
- Date formed: 15 March 1919
- Date dissolved: 17 October 1919

People and organisations
- Head of government: Karl Renner
- Deputy head of government: Jodok Fink
- Total no. of members: 11
- Member parties: SDAP; CS

History
- Election: 1919
- Predecessor: First Renner government
- Successor: Third Renner government

The Second government of Karl Renner was a short-lived Austrian provisional government, formed shortly after World War I. It was sworn in on 15 March 1919. It succeeded the First Renner government, which had resigned on 3 March 1919, but had continued at the request of the State Council until the election. It was replaced with the Third Renner government.

== Composition ==
Some of the members were carryover from the First Renner government, and some continued into the Third Renner government.

Portfolio	Minister	Took office	Left office	Party
Chancellor	Karl Renner	30 October 1918	7 July 1920	SDAPÖ
Vice-Chancellor	Jodok Fink	15 March 1919	26 March 1920	CS
State Secretary of Justice	Richard Bratusch	15 March 1919	17 October 1919	CS
State Secretary of Finance	Joseph Schumpeter	15 March 1919	17 October 1919	Independent
State Secretary of Agriculture	Josef Stöckler	15 March 1919	17 October 1919	CS
State Secretary of Commerce, Industry and Construction	Johann Zerdik	15 March 1919	17 October 1919	CS
State Secretary of Social Affairs	Ferdinand Hanusch	15 March 1919	22 October 1920	SDAPÖ
State Secretary of Foreign Affairs	Otto Bauer	21 November 1918	26 July 1919	SDAPÖ
State Secretary of Foreign Affairs	Karl Renner	26 July 1919	22 October 1920	SDAPÖ
State Secretary of the Army	Julius Deutsch	15 March 1919	22 October 1920	SDAPÖ
State Secretary of Health	Johann Löwenfeld-Ruß	30 October 1918	7 July 1920	Independent
State Secretary of Transport	Ludwig Paul	15 March 1919	1 July 1920	Independent
