= Alexander Schallenberg =

Chancellor of Austria in 2021 and 2025

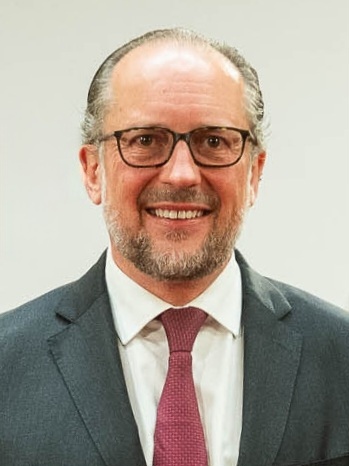
- Schallenberg in 2025

Chancellor of Austria
- Acting; 10 January 2025 – 3 March 2025
- President: Alexander Van der Bellen
- Preceded by: Karl Nehammer
- Succeeded by: Christian Stocker
- In office 11 October 2021 – 6 December 2021
- President: Alexander Van der Bellen
- Vice-Chancellor: Werner Kogler
- Preceded by: Sebastian Kurz
- Succeeded by: Karl Nehammer

Minister of Foreign Affairs
- In office 6 December 2021 – 3 March 2025
- Chancellor: Karl Nehammer; Himself (acting)
- Preceded by: Michael Linhart
- Succeeded by: Beate Meinl-Reisinger
- In office 3 June 2019 – 11 October 2021
- Chancellor: Brigitte Bierlein; Sebastian Kurz
- Preceded by: Karin Kneissl
- Succeeded by: Michael Linhart

Minister of the Chancellery
- In office 6 June 2019 – 7 January 2020 Serving with Ines Stilling
- Chancellor: Brigitte Bierlein
- Preceded by: Gernot Blümel; Juliane Bogner-Strauß
- Succeeded by: Christine Aschbacher; Karoline Edtstadler; Susanne Raab

Personal details
- Born: Alexander Georg Nicolas Schallenberg; 20 June 1969 (age 57) Bern, Switzerland
- Party: People's Party (2020–present)
- Other political affiliations: Independent (before 2020)
- Spouse: Marie-Isabelle Hénin (m. 1995) (divorced)
- Children: 4
- Parent: Wolfgang Schallenberg (father)
- Education: University of Vienna; Panthéon-Assas University; College of Europe

Alexander Georg Nicolas Schallenberg (Austrian German: [alɛˈksandɐ ˈɡeːɔrɡ ˈnɪkolas ˈʃalənbɛrɡ]; born 20 June 1969) is an Austrian diplomat, jurist, and politician who served as the minister of foreign affairs from 2019 until 2025, briefly interrupted by a period from October until December 2021, when he served as 27th chancellor of Austria, a role he served in an acting capacity again from January to March 2025.

A member of the Austrian People's Party (ÖVP), he held the position in the Bierlein government and Second Kurz government, before briefly serving as chancellor as Kurz's successor from 11 October to 6 December 2021 (Schallenberg government). On 10 January 2025, Schallenberg was appointed acting chancellor by President Alexander Van der Bellen, following the resignation of Karl Nehammer, who himself had served in an Caretaking capacity since October 2024 following the legislative elections the previous month.

A member of the Schallenberg family and a graduate of the College of Europe, Schallenberg was a career diplomat who became a mentor to Kurz when the latter became foreign minister. Kurz appointed him director of strategic foreign policy planning and head of the European department. Schallenberg joined the cabinet as foreign minister in 2019. After Kurz announced his pending resignation on 9 October 2021, Schallenberg was proposed by the ÖVP to replace him as Chancellor of Austria. He was sworn in on 11 October 2021. Schallenberg announced his pending resignation on 2 December 2021, after less than two months in office. His resignation took effect on 6 December; he returned to the position of foreign minister.

== Background and family ==
A member of the comital branch of the Austro-Hungarian Schallenberg family, Schallenberg was born in 1969 in Bern, Switzerland, where his father Wolfgang was Austrian ambassador to Switzerland. His mother is a native of Switzerland, and the daughter of Swiss banker and president of UBS Alfred Schaefer. Schallenberg was raised in India, Spain and France where his father served as ambassador; his father eventually became Secretary-General of the Foreign Ministry. Schallenberg speaks German, French, English and Spanish fluently, and has basic knowledge of Russian. The Genealogisches Handbuch des Adels lists his given names as Alexander Georg Nicolas Christoph Wolfgang Tassilo, though Schallenberg has disputed this and listed Alexander Georg Nicolas as his given names.

His paternal grandfather, Herbert, Count of Schallenberg (1901–1974), was Austrian consul general in Prague, while his paternal grandmother was the daughter of politician Walter Koch, the Saxon and later German ambassador in Prague. He is a 2nd great-grandson of Austro-Hungarian general Karl Kostersitz von Marenhorst. Schallenberg has mainly Swiss ancestry on his mother's side and Austrian, Bohemian, Moravian, Hungarian and Saxon ancestry on his father's side. Alexander Schallenberg's traditional title is Count, the hereditary title his family was conferred in 1666 within the Habsburg Hereditary Lands. (Note: The much smaller modern Republic of Austria that only encompasses a part of the Hereditary Lands does not recognise noble titles. In his country of birth, Switzerland, noble titles are often used socially, but have no special legal status. Hungary has no special regulation regarding noble titles; the same is true in the Czech Republic and several other modern successor countries of the Hereditary Lands.) He is the first chancellor since Kurt Schuschnigg and Prince Starhemberg to belong to a noble family.

=== Marriage and children ===
Schallenberg married French–Belgian European civil servant and fellow graduate of the College of Europe Marie-Isabelle Hénin (born 1969 in Uccle) in Saint-Pierre, France in 1995. She is the daughter of Erik Hénin and noted equestrian and 1960s Parisian socialite Isabelle Le Maresquier, and a granddaughter of the prominent French architect Noël Le Maresquier and Spanish noblewoman Conchita López de Tejada; Isabelle Le Maresquier was a niece of French prime minister Michel Debré. Her family was discussed as an example of French "state nobility" by Pierre Bourdieu.

Alexander and Marie-Isabelle Schallenberg have four children; they later divorced.

== Education and early career ==
From 1989 to 1994, he studied law at the University of Vienna and the University of Paris II Panthéon-Assas. From 1995 to 1996 he earned an LL.M. in European law at the College of Europe in Bruges, Belgium, an institution that aims "to train an elite of young executives for Europe" and whose graduates are said to form a close-knit "Bruges Mafia." Schallenberg was a graduate of the "Walter Hallstein promotion."

In 1997, Schallenberg joined the Austrian diplomatic service. From 2000 to 2005, he worked at the permanent representation of Austria to the European Union in Brussels, where he headed the legal department. In 2006, he became a press spokesman to Foreign Minister Ursula Plassnik, a fellow College of Europe graduate. When Sebastian Kurz became foreign minister, Schallenberg was appointed as director of strategic foreign policy planning in 2013. Originally he was scheduled to become ambassador to India in 2014, but he chose to remain at the foreign ministry to work with the new foreign minister. Schallenberg was widely seen as a mentor to the inexperienced Kurz who knew little of foreign policy, who in turn promoted him to senior posts. In 2016 Schallenberg became head of the European department of the foreign ministry.

== Political career ==
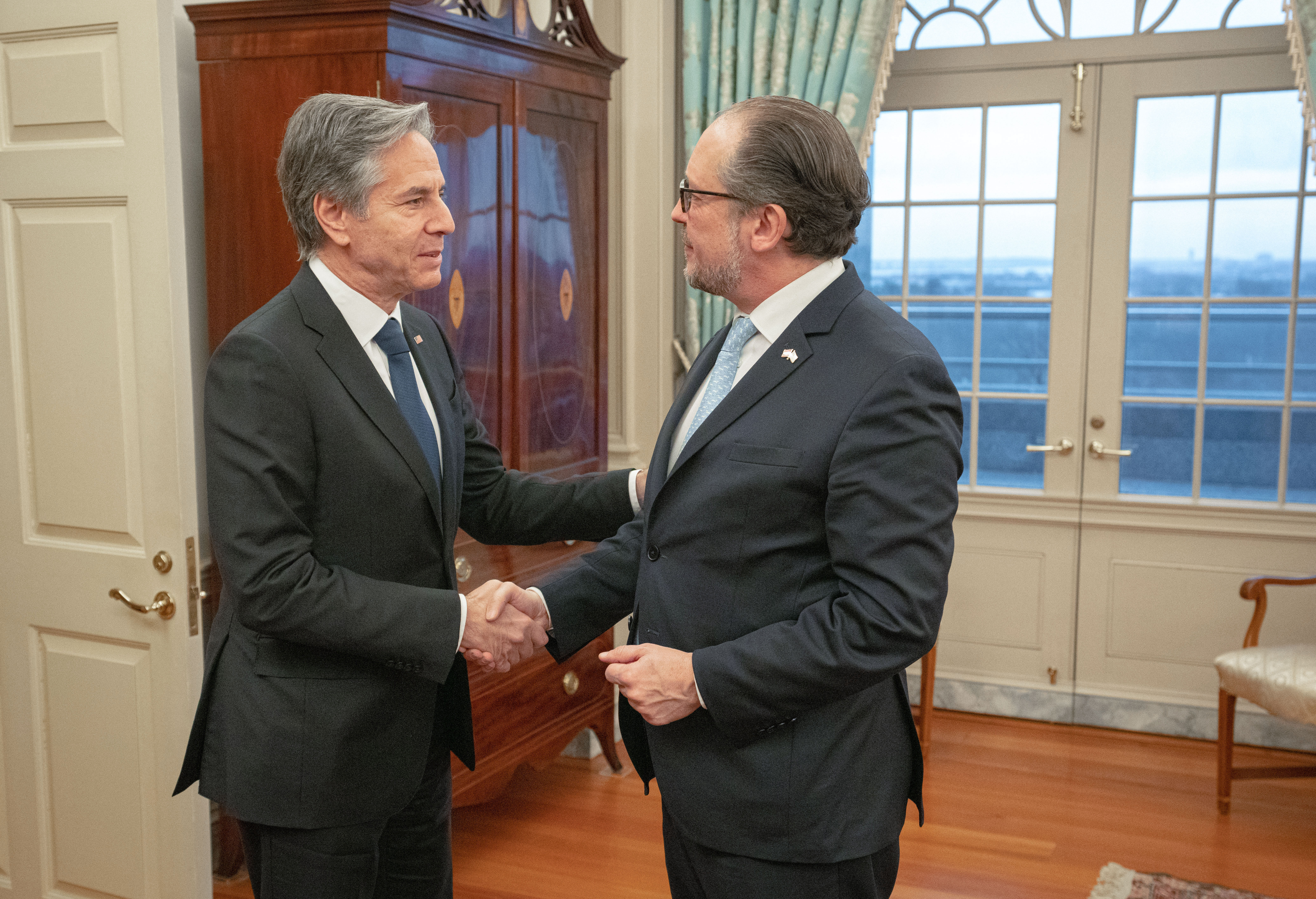
Schallenberg meeting with U.S. Secretary of State Antony Blinken, 7 February 2023

On 3 June 2019, Schallenberg succeeded Karin Kneissl as foreign minister of Austria. He maintained his position as part of the second Kurz cabinet, which was sworn in on 7 January 2020. He stepped down when he became chancellor, but returned to the position following his resignation.

=== Chancellor ===
After Kurz announced his pending resignation on 9 October 2021 as a result of the Kurz corruption probe, Schallenberg was proposed by the ÖVP to replace him as chancellor of Austria.

Schallenberg was sworn in as chancellor on 11 October 2021 by President Alexander Van der Bellen. In his first official act, he nominated career diplomat and ambassador to France Michael Linhart to succeed him as foreign minister.

In November 2021, Schallenberg announced that COVID-19 vaccines would be mandatory in Austria from February 2022. It became the first European country to mandate the vaccine.

Schallenberg announced his resignation on 2 December 2021 following Kurz's announcement that he was leaving politics just a few hours prior. As his reason for stepping down, he cited his belief that the chancellor and party leader should be the same person.

=== Foreign minister ===
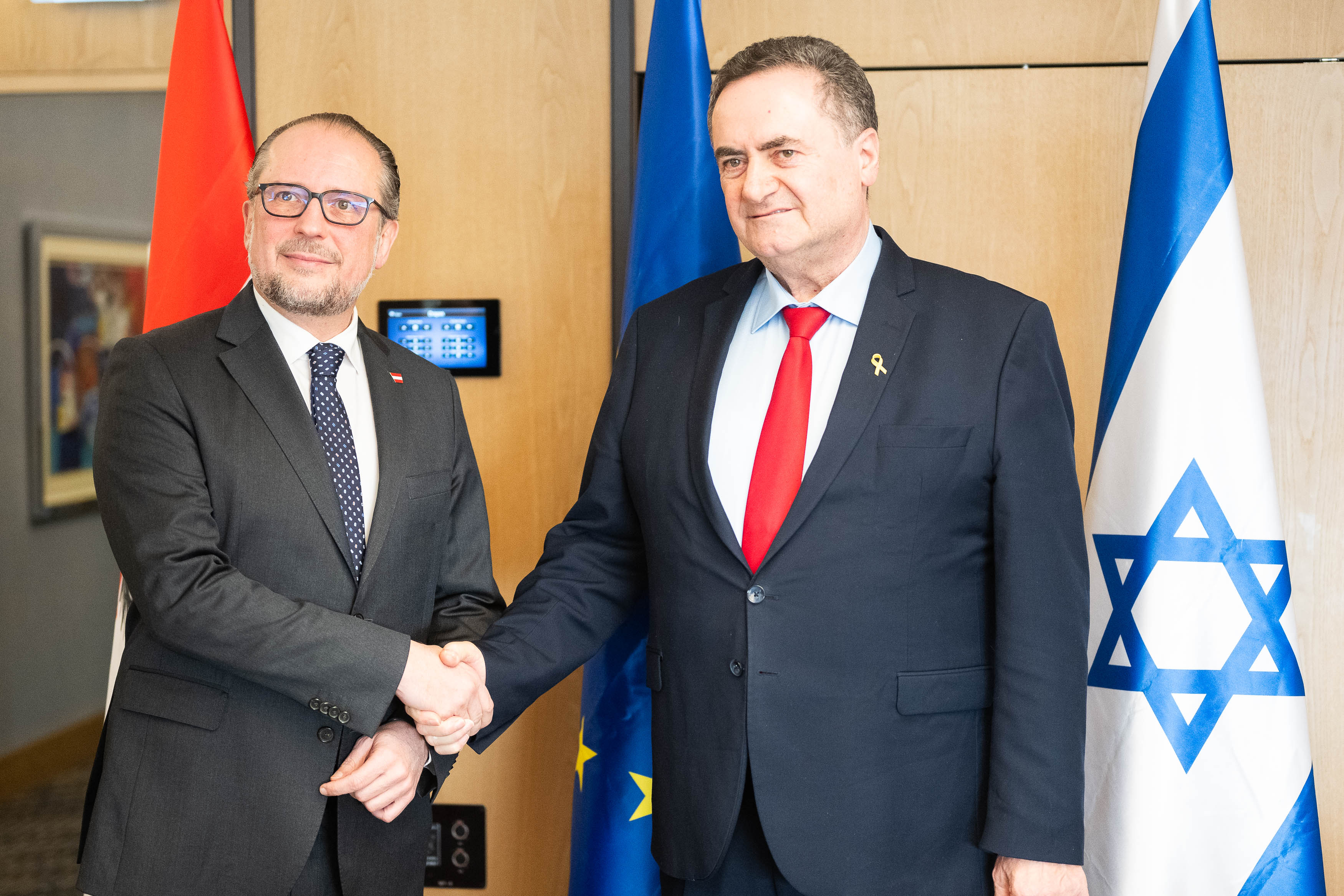
Schallenberg with Israeli Foreign Minister Israel Katz in Tel Aviv, Israel, 27 February 2024

On 9 October 2023, Schallenberg announced the suspension of the delivery of €19 million ($20 million) of aid to Palestinian areas in response to Gaza war and said that it would review its existing projects in Palestinian Territories. He also said that he would summon the Iranian ambassador to address Iran's "abhorrent reactions" to the attack.

In 2025, Schallenberg was appointed interim Chancellor for a second time by President Van der Bellen effective 10 January, following the resignation of Karl Nehammer.

== Honours ==
- Grand Cross of the Order of Merit of the Principality of Liechtenstein (2019)
- Knight Grand Cross of the Order of Merit of the Italian Republic (2020)
- Commander of the Order of Legion of Honour (2026)

== Other activities ==
Since 2020, Schallenberg has been a trustee of the National Fund of the Republic of Austria for Victims of National Socialism.

== Explanatory notes ==
Political offices
Preceded by Gernot Blümel; Juliane Bogner-Strauß	Minister of the Chancellery; 2019–2020; Served alongside: Ines Stilling	Succeeded by Christine Aschbacher; Karoline Edtstadler; Susanne Raab
Preceded by Karin Kneissl	Minister of Foreign Affairs; 2019–2021	Succeeded by Michael Linhart
Preceded by Sebastian Kurz	Chancellor of Austria; 2021	Succeeded by Karl Nehammer
Preceded by Michael Linhart	Minister of Foreign Affairs; 2021–2025	Succeeded by Beate Meinl-Reisinger
Preceded by Karl Nehammer	Acting Chancellor of Austria; 2025	Succeeded by Christian Stocker
