= Noël Le Maresquier =

French architect

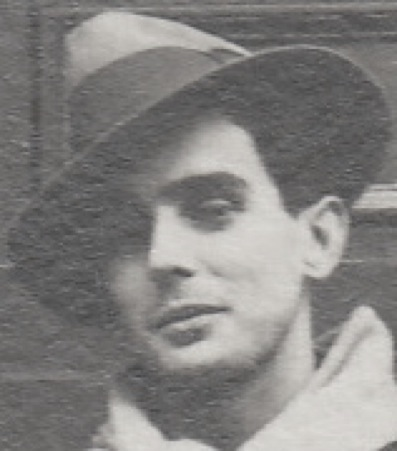
Noël Le Maresquier

Noël Le Maresquier (6 August 1903 – 20 October 1982) was a French architect and one of the most prominent postwar architects of France.

== Career ==
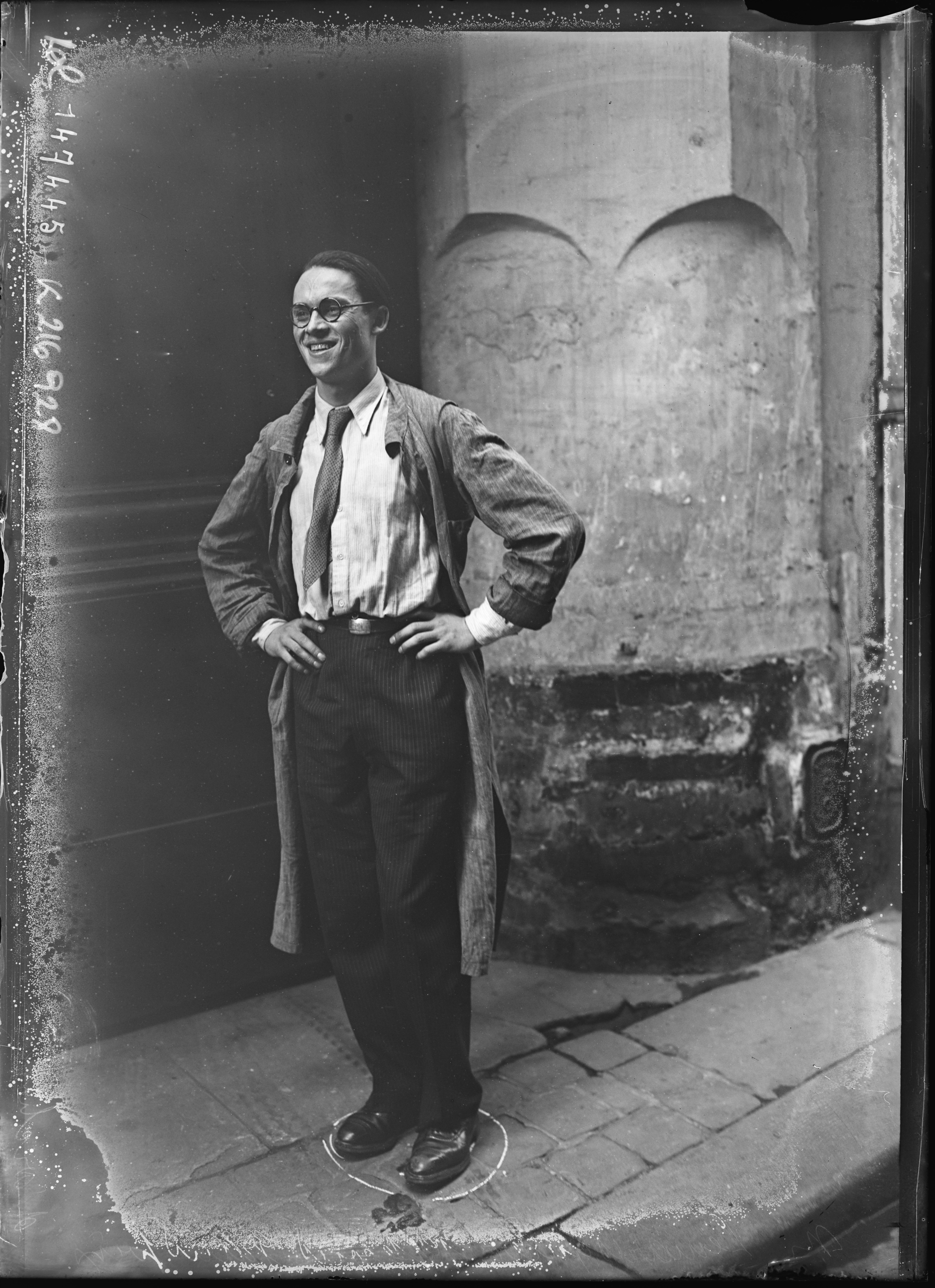
In 1930, winner of Prix de Rome.

Born in Paris, he was the son of the prominent architect Charles Lemaresquier, and succeeded his father as head of the Beaux-Arts de Paris grande école. He continued his father's Atelier Lemaresquier.

He was the brother-in-law of French Prime Minister Michel Debré. Le Maresquier and his family are referred to as French "state nobility" by Pierre Bourdieu.

In 1944 he was tasked with the reconstruction of several cities bombed by the Americans like Saint-Nazaire; he was a supporter of the clean slate approach, unlike Louis Arretche in Saint-Malo.

== Family ==
Le Maresquier was married to the Spanish noblewoman Conchita López de Tejada; their daughter Isabelle Le Maresquier was an accomplished equestrian in the 1960s and 1970s. Isabelle was the mother of Marie-Isabelle Hénin, the wife of the Chancellor of Austria, Alexander Schallenberg.
