= Isabelle Le Maresquier =

Isabelle Le Maresquier was a French equestrian and a prominent socialite of Parisian high society from the late 1950s and during the 1960s.

== Horseriding ==
A noted equestrian during the 1960s and 1970s, she became the first woman to win in a mixed horserace on 8 November 1975.

== Family ==
Born in Paris, she was a daughter of the prominent architect Noël Le Maresquier and Spanish noblewoman Conchita López de Tejada, and was the niece of French Prime Minister Michel Debré. Her family was referred to as French "state nobility" by Pierre Bourdieu. She was the mother-in-law of the Chancellor of Austria, Alexander Schallenberg.
