= Christine Aschbacher =

Austrian People's Party politician

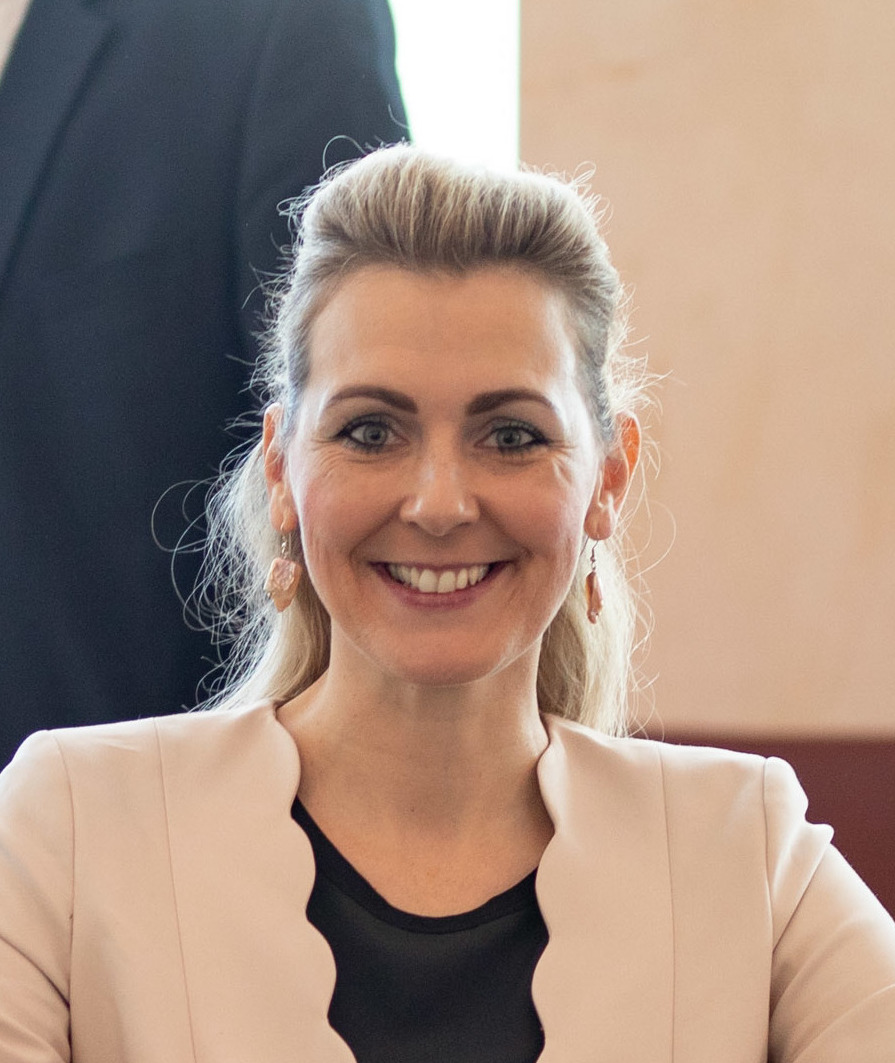

Minister of Labour, Family and Youth
- In office 7 January 2020 – 9 January 2021
- Chancellor: Sebastian Kurz
- Preceded by: Ines Stilling
- Succeeded by: Martin Kocher

Personal details
- Born: 10 July 1983 (age 42) Wundschuh, Styria, Austria
- Party: Austrian People's Party

Christine Aschbacher (born 10 July 1983) is a former Austrian People's Party politician who served in the Second Kurz government as minister of labour, family and youth between January 2020 and January 2021.

== Early life and education ==
Aschbacher was born in Wundschuh, a small town in Styria. She studied management, Organizational Consulting and Human Resources Management as well as Marketing and Sales, receiving a master's degree in 2006. She began doctoral studies in Industrial Engineering and Management at the Slovak University of Technology in Bratislava in 2011 and received the PhD from Bratislava in August 2020.

== Professional activities ==
She worked for Piewald Management Training from 2003 to 2006, and then (2006-2012) as a consultant at Capgemini Consulting. She served on the team of Maria Fekter (Minister of Finance) from June 2012 to December 2013. 2014 she led the department of Risk Management. From October 2014 to May 2015 she served on the staff of Reinhold Mitterlehner in the Ministry for Education, Research and Economics. She opened the Aschbacher Advisory Agency in September 2015.

== Family ==
Christine Aschbacher is married and has three children. Her sister Barbara Walch was elected Mayor of Wundschuh in 2019. Their father, Alois Kowald, was mayor of Neudorf ob Wildon and her uncle Josef Kowald was a member of the Styrian state parliament.

== Political career ==
Chancellor of Austria Sebastian Kurz appointed Aschbacher to his cabinet in January 2020; she resigned in 2021 amid thesis plagiarism accusations.

== Plagiarism accusations and resignation ==
On 7 January 2021 plagiarism researcher Stefan Weber accused serious errors and plagiarism in Aschbacher's master's thesis, submitted to a college in Wiener Neustadt where she had been enrolled from 2002 to 2006. It soon emerged that she faced public accusations of plagiarism, with critics pointing to other parts allegedly written in rambling, grammatically incorrect German. The same accusations were raised against at the doctoral dissertation she submitted the Slovak University of Technology in Bratislava. On 9 January 2021, Aschbacher resigned from her post as minister.
Aschbacher rejected all allegations of plagiarism and denied any wrongdoing in connection with the scandal, stating that her resignation was intended to protect her family from further media pressure. Subsequent institutional reviews did not uphold the plagiarism allegations against her: the proceedings at University of Applied Sciences Wiener Neustadt regarding her thesis were discontinued in 2021, and in February 2023, a review commission at the Slovak University of Technology in Bratislava concluded that her doctoral dissertation did not constitute plagiarism, allowing her to retain her PhD title.
