= Karin Kneissl =

Austrian diplomat, journalist, and politician (born 1965)

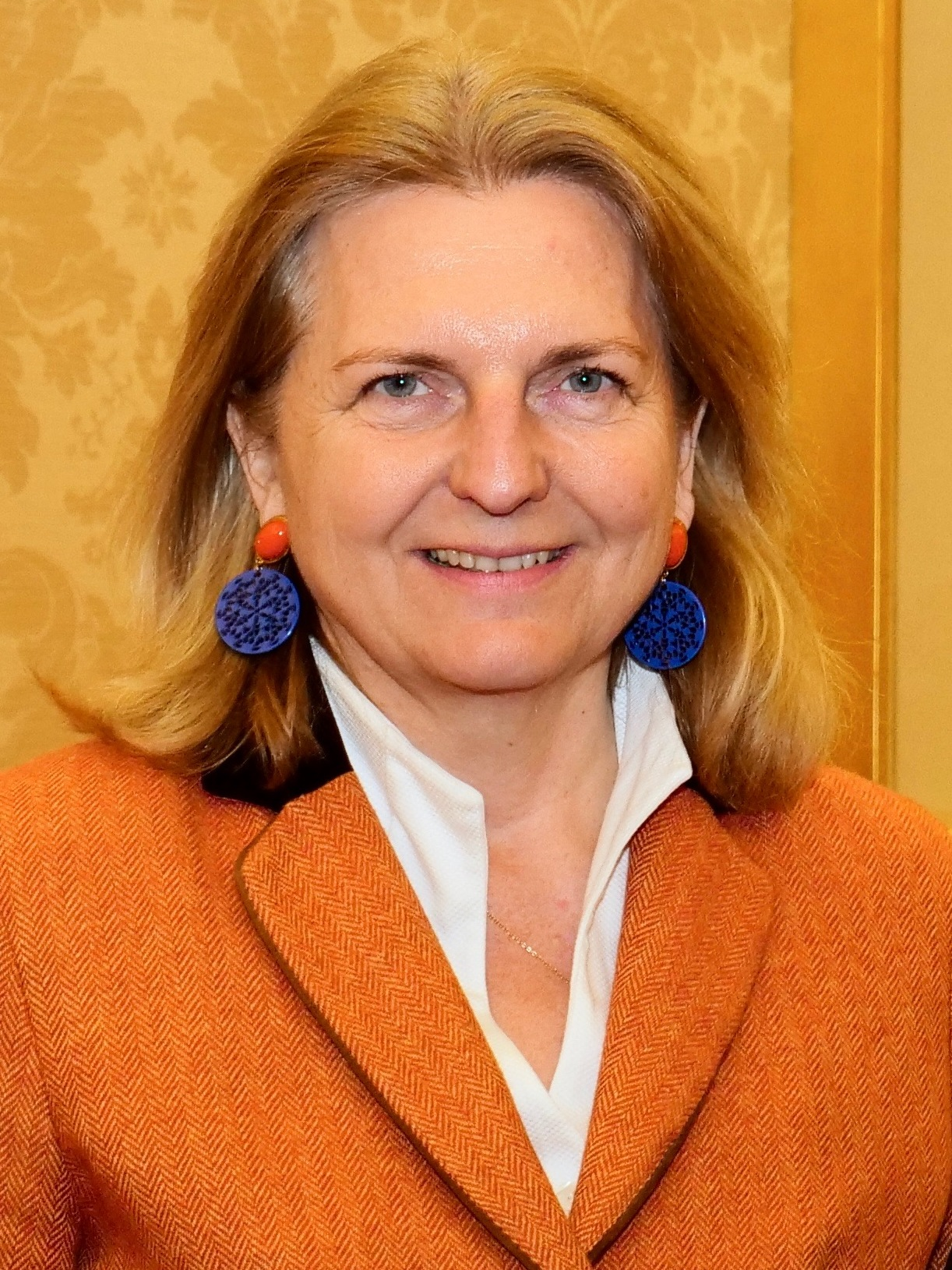

Minister of Foreign Affairs
- In office 18 December 2017 – 3 June 2019
- Chancellor: Sebastian Kurz
- Preceded by: Sebastian Kurz
- Succeeded by: Alexander Schallenberg

Chairperson-in-Office of the Organization for Security and Co-operation in Europe
- In office 18 December 2017 – 31 December 2017
- Preceded by: Sebastian Kurz
- Succeeded by: Angelino Alfano

Personal details
- Born: 18 January 1965 (age 61) Vienna, Austria
- Party: Independent
- Spouse: Wolfgang Meilinger (m. 2018)
- Education: University of Vienna; École nationale d'administration

Karin Kneissl (born 18 January 1965) is an Austrian diplomat, journalist, and politician. She served as Minister of Foreign Affairs between 2017 and 2019. Prior to assuming her government position, she was a lecturer.

In politics, Kneissl advocated for closer relations between Austria and Russia. She is a personal friend of Russian President Vladimir Putin. From 2021 to 2022, she was a member of the board at Rosneft. She moved to Russia in 2023, where she heads a think tank at St. Petersburg State University.

== Early life and education ==
Born in Vienna, Kneissl spent part of her childhood in Amman, where her father worked as a pilot for King Hussein of Jordan and also was involved in developing Royal Jordanian Airlines. In her youth and student days Kneissl also was active in Amnesty International and supported environmental and human rights organizations worldwide.

Kneissl studied law and Oriental languages at the University of Vienna between 1983 and 1987. After graduating, she studied International relations at the Hebrew University of Jerusalem and the University of Jordan in Amman. Subsequently, she spent a year as a Fulbright fellow at the Center for Contemporary Arab Studies at Georgetown University. In 1992 she graduated from the École nationale d'administration.

In addition to German, Kneissl can speak Arabic, English, French, and Spanish. She also has basic knowledge of Hebrew, Hungarian, and Italian.

== Diplomatic and political career ==
In 1990 she joined Austria's Foreign Office. From 1990 to 1998 she worked in the cabinet of ÖVP foreign minister Alois Mock, in the International Law Office, and was posted abroad in Paris and Madrid.

She has claimed that she was among the co-founders of the Austrian section of Médecins Sans Frontières in 1992/93, however the claim has been denied by the organization which has no record of her involvement.

She left the diplomatic service in the fall of 1998, and lived in Seibersdorf near Vienna, where she was active between 2005 and 2010 as an independent local councilor on the list of ÖVP. Kneissl also worked as a freelance journalist for German and English-language print media and as a political analyst for the Austrian Broadcasting Corporation. She authored several specialized and non-fiction books.

As an expert in international law, history of the Middle East and the energy market, Kneissl taught at the Diplomatic Academy of Vienna, the European Business School in Rheingau and was a guest lecturer at the National Defense Academy, the Military Academy in Wiener Neustadt and at universities in Lebanon, among them the francophone Université Saint-Joseph in Beirut. For ten years, she worked at the Department of Political Science at the University of Vienna. In her public writings and appearances Kneissl has often sharply criticized the European Union and raised controversy with remarks on migration. In July 2016, after the Brexit referendum, she criticized European Commission president Jean-Claude Juncker as "cynic of power", "rowdy" and "arrogant", who "behaves as a Brussels Caesar, who has made it his goal to break agreements, if it seems useful."

A quote from her book "My Middle East" also caused controversy. She criticized Zionism, founded by Austro-Hungarian publicist Theodor Herzl, as a "blood and soil ideology" based on German nationalism in the 19th century.

On the issue of refugees, migration, and integration she has been accused of perpetuating stereotypes. At the height of the 2015 European migrant crisis, Kneissl argued that most of them were economic migrants and that asylum seekers are "80 percent" young men between the ages of 20 and 30. In September 2015, she said on public television that one of the reasons for the revolts in the Arab world was "these many young men", "testosterone-controlled", "who no longer managed to get a wife today" because they have neither work nor their own home, and thus could not achieve "status as a man in a traditional society". She also sharply criticized German Chancellor Angela Merkel as "grossly negligent" for her selfies with refugees, and later described the EU-Turkey statement, 18 March 2016 as "nonsense".

Such remarks led to criticism and caused doubts concerning her self-definition as a "conservative free-thinker", but also gained praise and sympathy from populist anti-migration party FPÖ, to whose events she was increasingly invited. In 2016, FPÖ leader Heinz-Christian Strache considered nominating Kneissl as presidential candidate, but eventually decided in favor of Norbert Hofer instead.

After Hofer was defeated by Alexander van der Bellen, Kneissl criticised Van der Bellen on the occasion of the discussion about the headscarf ban, doubting his intelligence, character and format. "Not only Trump, others also provoke", she said, criticizing Van der Bellen and Pope Francis, who had compared refugee camps to concentration camps.

== Minister of Foreign Affairs ==
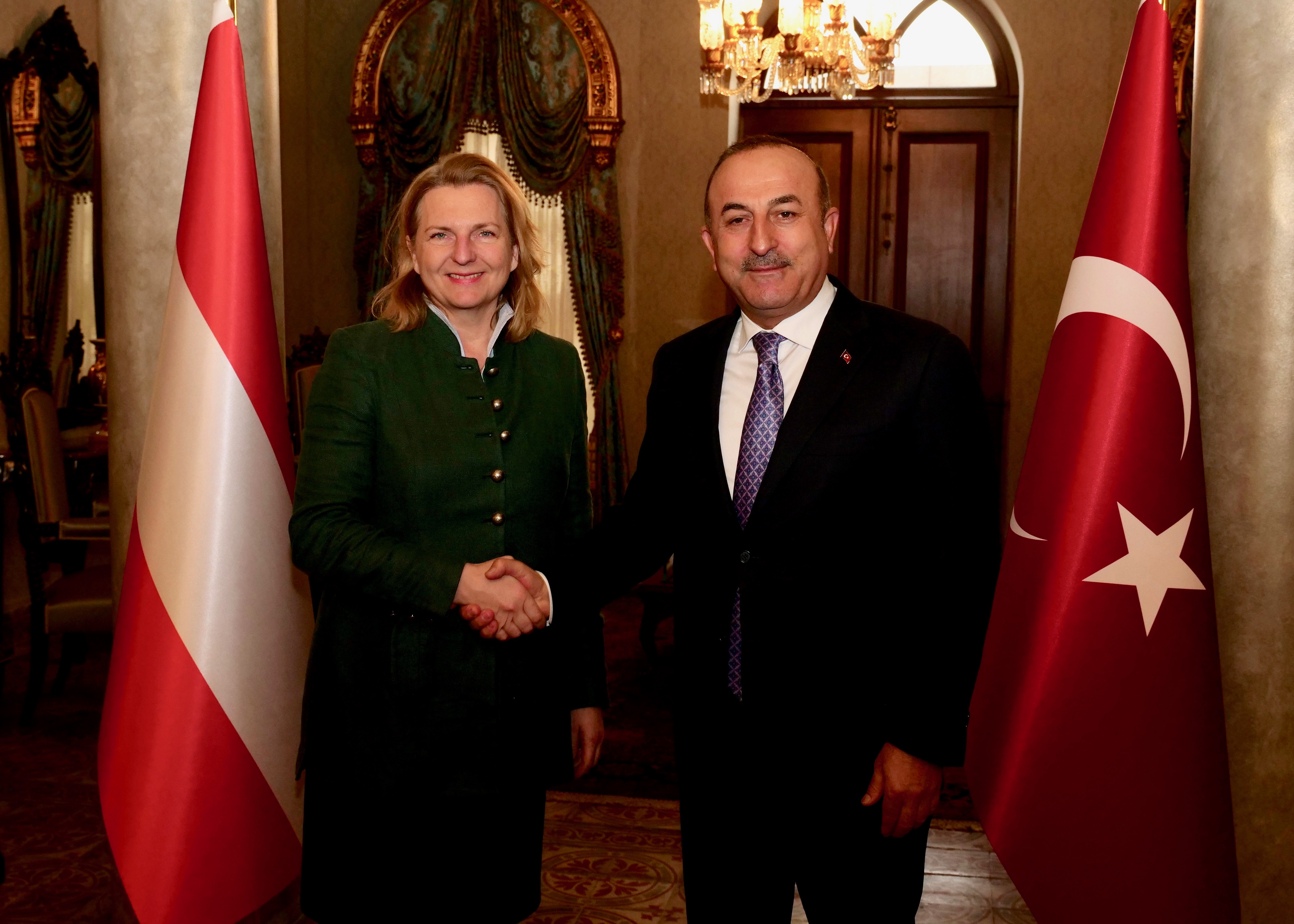
Kneissl with Turkish Foreign Minister Mevlüt Çavuşoğlu, 25 January 2018

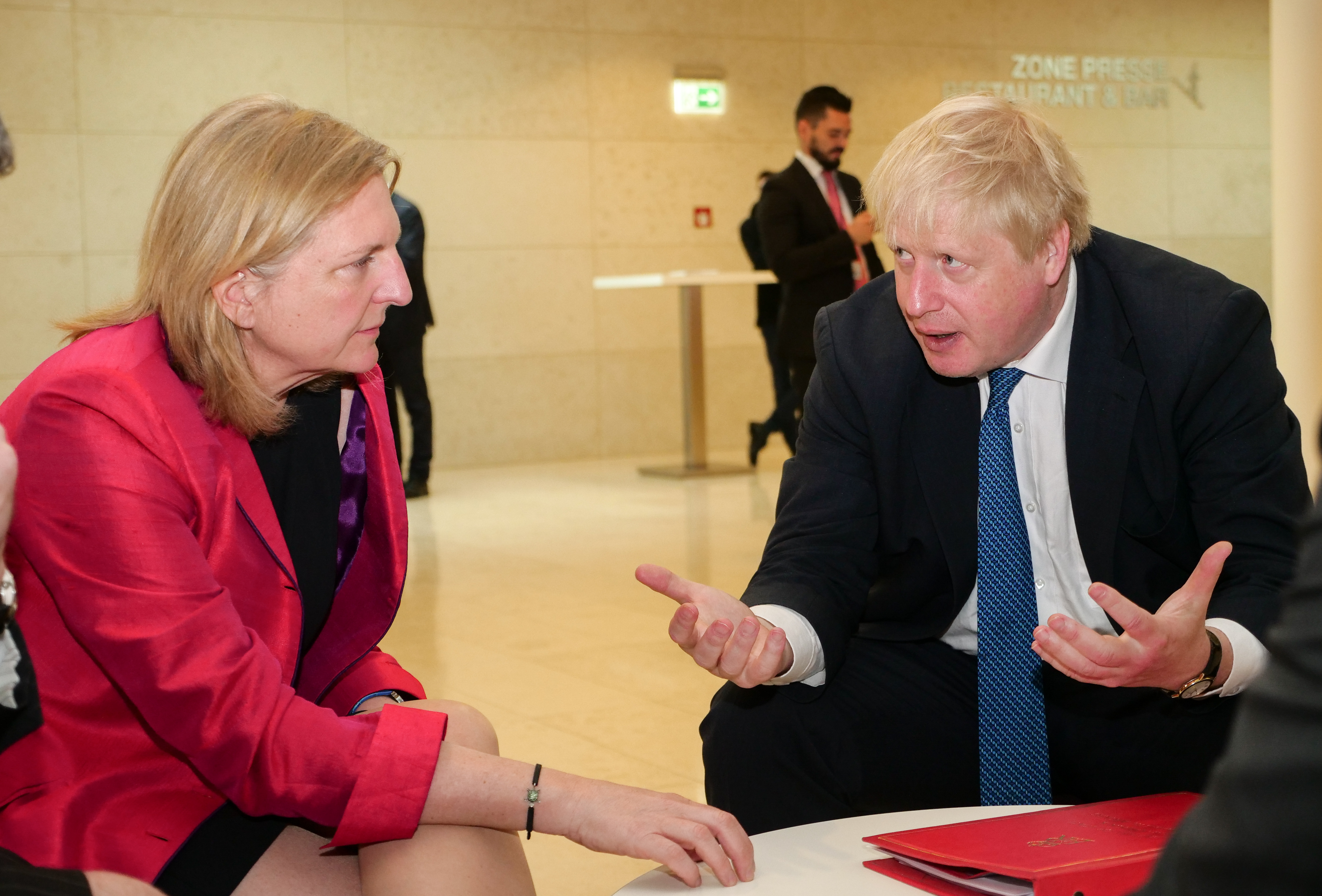
Kneissl with Britain's Foreign Secretary Boris Johnson, 16 April 2018

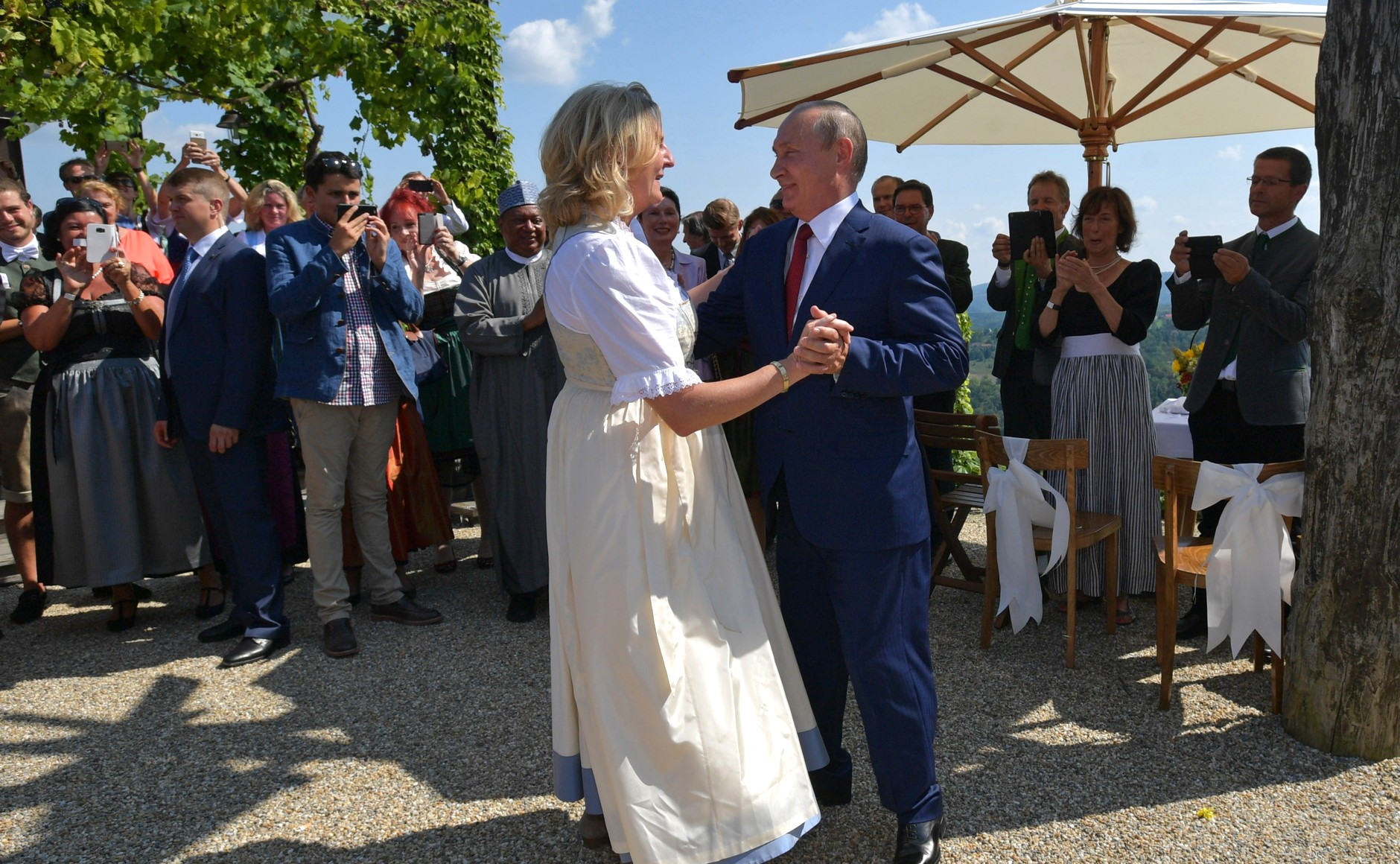
Kneissl with Vladimir Putin, 18 August 2018

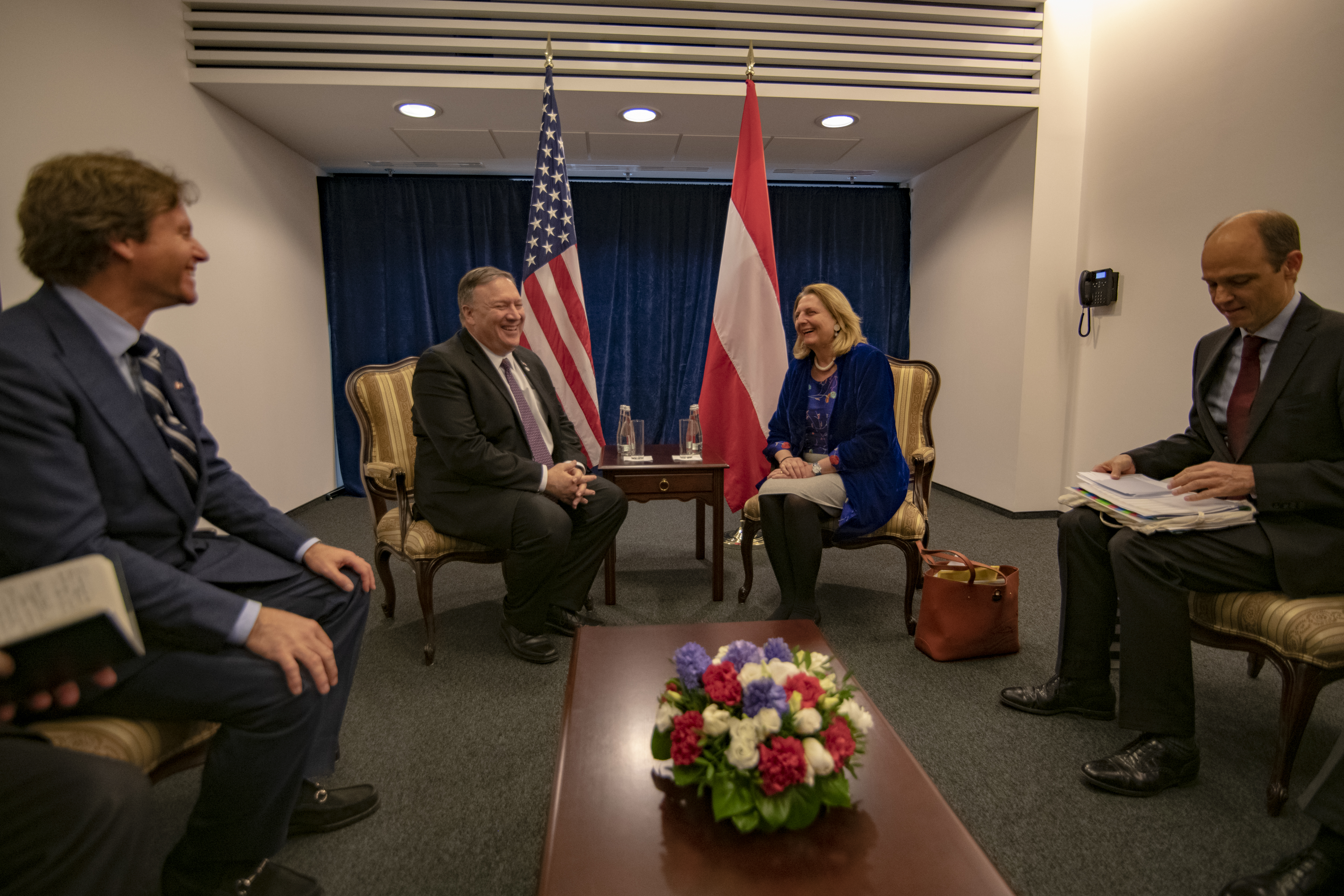
Kneissl with U.S. Secretary of State Mike Pompeo, 14 February 2019

Kneissl was nominated by FPÖ as a non-party member for the post of Foreign Minister of Austria in the government of Sebastian Kurz. Kneissl was the third woman to hold this function. Her nomination was reportedly linked to the reservations expressed by president Van der Bellen concerning other FPÖ-endorsed candidates for the post. Kneissl was praised by FPÖ leader Heinz-Christian Strache as "a great personality, a female Kreisky perhaps in the future when it comes to mediation, acceptance and advertising for Austria abroad."

In August 2018, she married entrepreneur Wolfgang Meilinger, 54, at a ceremony in the small town of Gamlitz, near the border with Slovenia. During the wedding, she danced with Russian president Vladimir Putin, who was in attendance, and subsequently performed a deep curtsey. Pictures of this gesture were widely published in Russian and international media, and sparked major outrage and criticism due to her perceived naivety.

On 3 June 2019, after a vote of no confidence ended the first Kurz government, she left political office.

== Later career ==
In 2020, Kneissl began contributing opinion articles to the Russian government outlet RT. In March 2021, Kneissl, who had disclosed financial problems at the beginning of the COVID-19 pandemic, was reported to have been appointed by the Russian government to the board of directors of the state gas company Rosneft.

Shortly before the Russian invasion of Ukraine in February 2022 began, Kneissl dismissed intelligence reports that an invasion was imminent, suggesting that this was Western "war hysteria" blown up by the media. Kneissl resigned from the board of Rosneft in May 2022, three months after the invasion began. According to text messages she sent to a Washington Post reporter, she had emigrated from Austria because of "death threats." She was reported to have rented a home in the Russian village of Petrushovo in 2022.

On 5 September 2022, Kneissl appeared at the Eastern Economic Forum in Vladivostok, where she was interviewed by RIA Novosti and declared that she had immigrated to Lebanon. In 2023, she described herself as a "political refugee."

In September 2023, Russian media reported that Kneissl had resettled along with her two ponies in Saint Petersburg, where she secured a position leading the Geopolitical Observatory for Russia’s Key Issues (GORKI), a research center at St. Petersburg State University established in March 2023 and tasked with advancing Russian foreign policy. Her horses reportedly passed through six countries and, at one point, were transported by a Russian Ilyushin Il-76 military transport plane from Syria. The Ilushin Il-76 had been previously sanctioned by the United States and Ukraine for transporting Wagner Group mercenaries.

As of July 2026, Kneissl primarily lives with her animals near Kasimov, where she is in the process of renovating an abandoned house. She periodically commutes to Saint Petersburg to work at GORKI. She has declined to renounce her Austrian citizenship and acquire Russian citizenship, although she has no intention to relocate again.

== Publications ==
- Der Grenzbegriff der Konfliktparteien im Nahen Osten. Dissertation, Universität Wien, 1991.
- Hizbollah: Libanesische Widerstandsbewegung, islamische Terrorgruppe oder bloss eine politische Partei? Eine Untersuchung der schiitischen Massenbewegung Hizbollah im libanesischen und regionalen Kontext. Landesverteidigungsakademie, Wien 2002, ISBN 3-901328-69-6.
- Der Energiepoker: Wie Erdöl und Erdgas die Weltwirtschaft beeinflussen. FinanzBuch, München 2006, ISBN 3-89879-187-4; 2., überarbeitete Auflage 2008, ISBN 978-3-89879-448-0.
- Die Gewaltspirale: Warum Orient und Okzident nicht miteinander können. Ecowin, Salzburg 2007, ISBN 978-3-902404-39-8.
- Testosteron Macht Politik. Braumüller, Wien 2012, ISBN 978-3-99100-068-6.
- Die zersplitterte Welt: Was von der Globalisierung bleibt. Braumüller, Wien 2013, ISBN 978-3-99100-086-0.
- Mein Naher Osten. Braumüller, Wien 2014, ISBN 978-3-99100-112-6.
- Prinz Eugen: Vom Außenseiter zum Genie Europas. Belvedere, Wien 2014, ISBN 978-3-902805-58-4.
- Wachablöse: Auf dem Weg in eine chinesische Weltordnung. Frank & Frei, 1 September 2017, ISBN 978-3950434842
- Diplomatie Macht Geschichte: Die Kunst des Dialogs in unsicheren Zeiten. Georg Olms Verlag, Hildesheim 2020, ISBN 978-3487086330
- Die Mobilitätswende: und ihre Brisanz für Gesellschaft und Weltwirtschaft. Braumüller Verlag, Wien 2020, ISBN 978-3991003076

Political offices
Preceded by Sebastian Kurz	Minister of Foreign Affairs; 2017–2019	Succeeded by Alexander Schallenberg
Diplomatic posts
Preceded by Sebastian Kurz	Chair of the Organization for Security and Co-operation in Europe; 2017	Succeeded by Angelino Alfano
