= Wolfgang Hattmannsdorfer =

Austrian politician (born 1979)

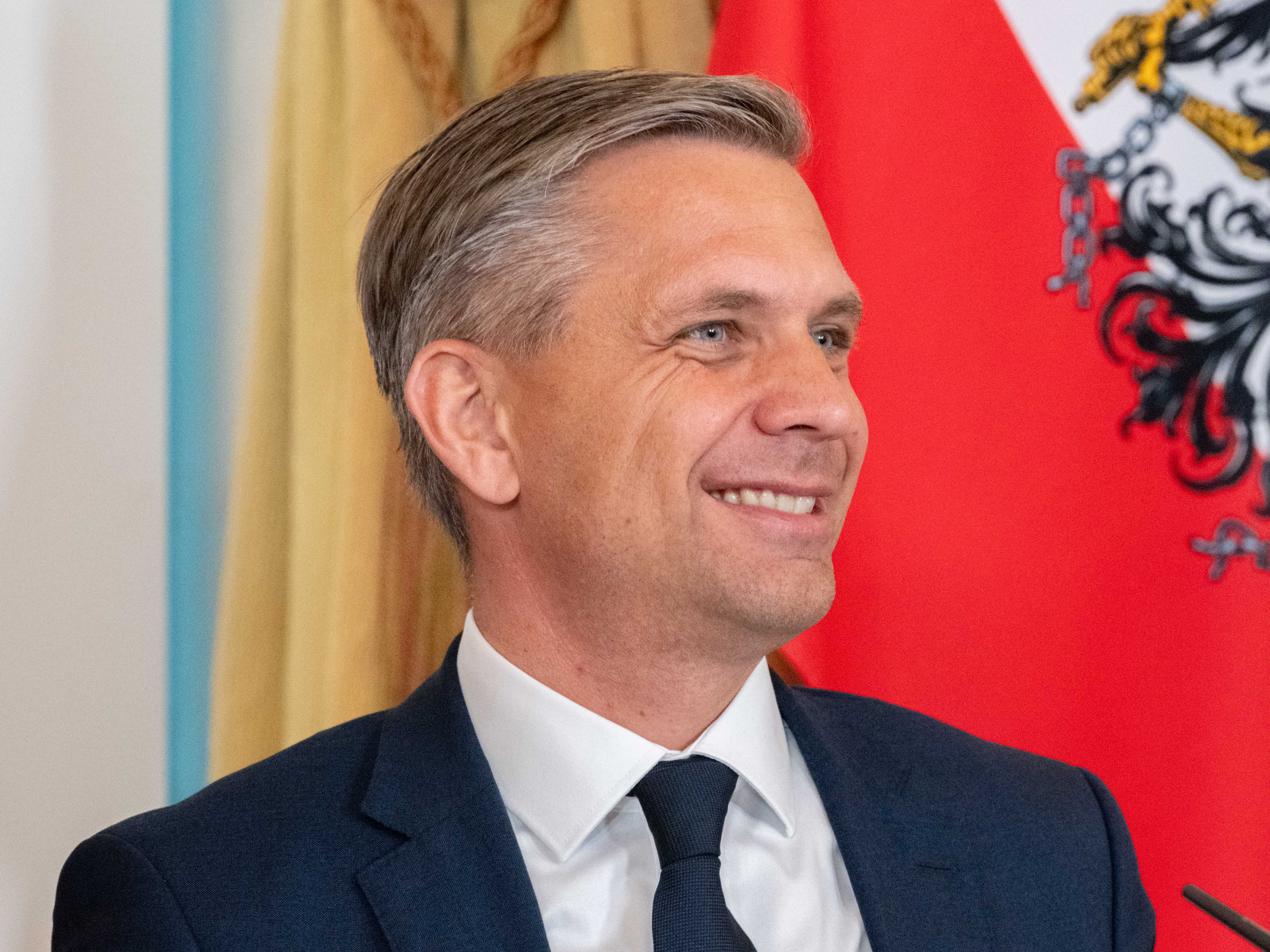
- Hattmannsdorfer in 2026

Minister for Economy, Energy and Tourism
- Incumbent
- Assumed office 1 April 2025
- Chancellor: Christian Stocker
- Preceded by: Martin Kocher

Minister for Labour and Economy
- In office 3 March 2025 – 1 April 2025
- Chancellor: Christian Stocker
- Succeeded by: Korinna Schumann

Member of the National Council
- In office 24 October 2024 – 3 March 2025

Personal details
- Born: 20 November 1979 (age 46) Linz, Upper Austria, Austria
- Party: People's Party
- Children: 2
- Education: Europagymnasium Auhof
- Alma mater: Johannes Kepler University Linz; National Taiwan University

Wolfgang Hattmannsdorfer (born 20 November 1979) is an Austrian politician of the People's Party. He was elected as a member of the National Council in the 2024 legislative election. He currently serves as Austria's Minister for Economy, Energy and Tourism. He has previously served as state councillor for social affairs, integration and youth of Upper Austria.
