= Elisabeth Udolf-Strobl =

Austrian civil servant (born 1956)

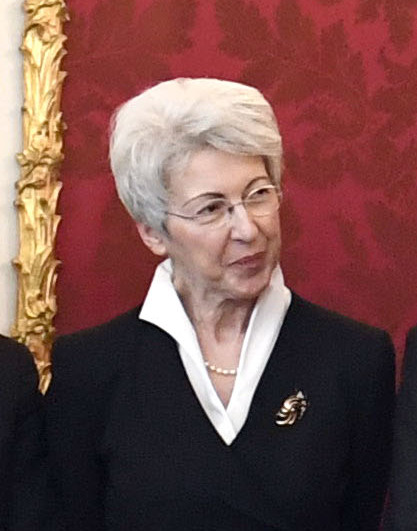
Elisabeth Udolf-Strobl in 2019

Elisabeth Udolf-Strobl (born 12 April 1956) is an Austrian civil servant. She served as Minister for Digital and Economic Affairs in the Bierlein government.

Udolf-Strobl studied at Vienna University and the Diplomatic Academy of Vienna. From 1986 she was employed by the Austrian trade ministry. From 2018 she was a board member of Austrian Standards International. On 3 June 2019 she was sworn in as federal minister.
