= Ines Stilling =

Austrian civil servant (born 1976)

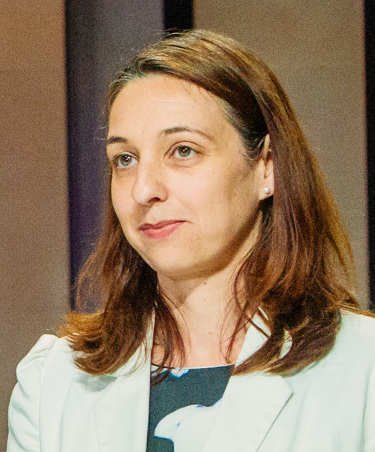
Ines Stilling in 2017

Ines Stilling (born 10 August 1976) is an Austrian civil servant who served as the Minister for Women, Families and Youth in the Bierlein government.

Stilling was born in Graz where she also later studied law at Karl-Franzens University. She worked for private companies and the Chamber for Workers and Employees until 2007, when she joined public service in the office of Doris Bures. She led the women's affairs section from 2012.

On 3 June 2019 Ines Stilling was sworn in as federal minister within the Chancellery under Brigitte Bierlein and made responsible for the Women, Families and Youth department.
