= Martin Kocher =

Austrian economist (born 1973)

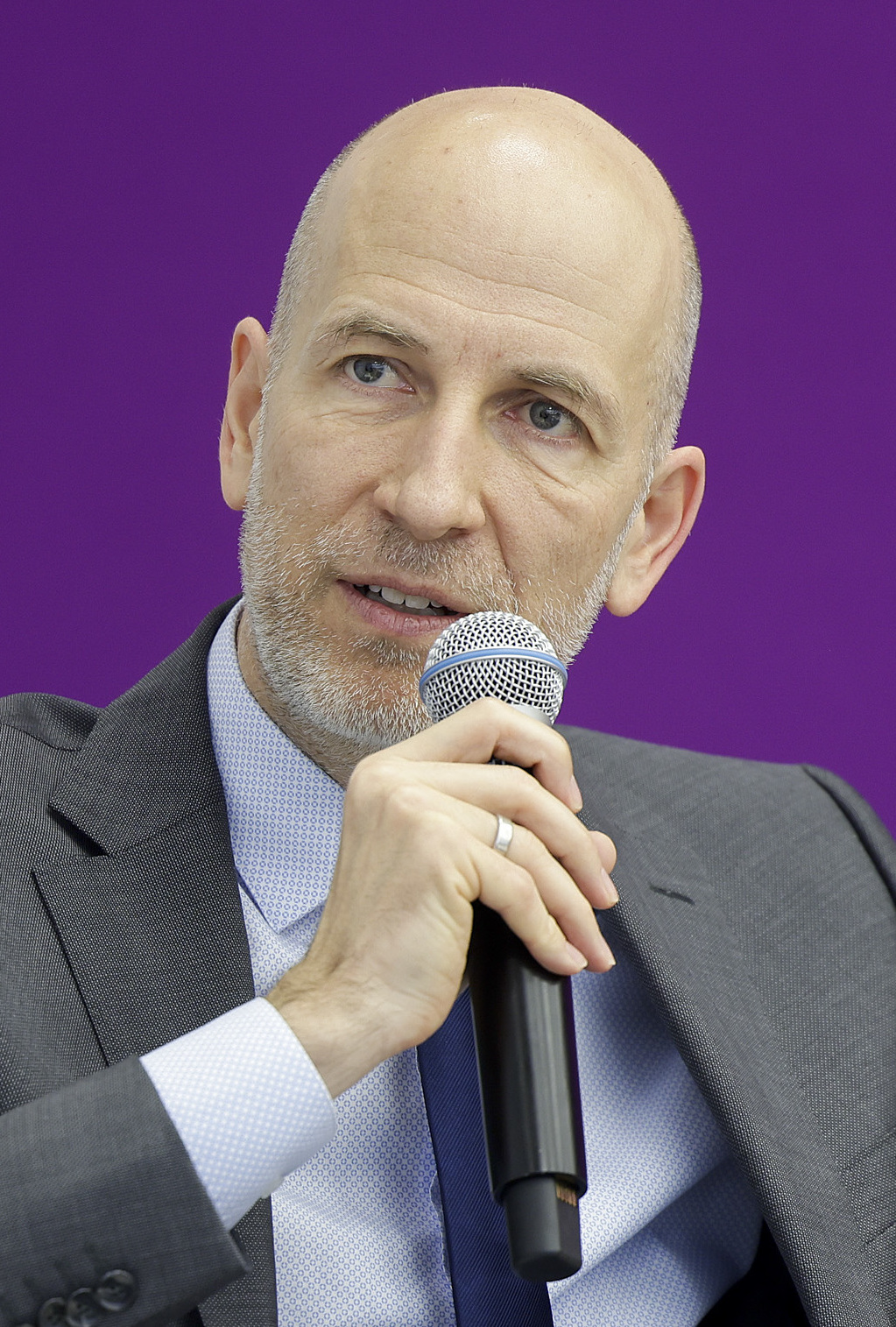

Minister of Economic Affairs
- In office 11 May 2022 – 3 March 2025
- Chancellor: Karl Nehammer; Alexander Schallenberg
- Preceded by: Margarete Schramböck
- Succeeded by: Wolfgang Hattmannsdorfer

Minister of Labour
- In office 11 January 2021 – 3 March 2025
- Chancellor: Sebastian Kurz; Alexander Schallenberg; Karl Nehammer
- Preceded by: Christine Aschbacher
- Succeeded by: Korinna Schumann

Personal details
- Born: 13 September 1973 (age 53) Salzburg, Austria
- Education: University of Innsbruck

Martin Georg Kocher (Austrian German: [ˈmartiːn ˈɡeːɔrɡ ˈkɔxɐ]; born 13 September 1973) is an Austrian economist, academic, and former politician who is serving as Governor of the Austrian National Bank since September 2025. He was minister in the governments of Sebastian Kurz, Karl Nehammer and Alexander Schallenberg. From January 2021 he was Minister for Labour and from May 2022 to March 2025, he held the position of Minister for Labour and Economic Affairs.

Kocher is a professor for behavioural economics at the University of Vienna, affiliated with the Department of Economics and the Vienna Center for Experimental Economics (VCEE). From 2016 to 2021, he was scientific director of the Institute for Advanced Studies (IHS) in Vienna.

== Education and career ==
Kocher completed his secondary education at the Pierre-de-Coubertin-BORG in Radstadt, graduating with the Matura in 1992. He studied economics at the University of Innsbruck, where he received his doctorate in 2002. He completed his habilitation, also at Innsbruck, in 2007. He spent two years as a visiting scholar at the University of Amsterdam.

In 2010, Kocher was appointed full professor at the University of East Anglia. In 2011, he accepted a position at LMU Munich. There, he served as Dean of Studies and later as Dean of the Faculty of Economics. He also was the director of the Munich Experimental Laboratory for Economic and Social Sciences (MELESSA), which was established as part of Germany’s Excellence Initiative.

Since 2011, Kocher has been affiliated with the University of Gothenburg as an affiliate (visiting) professor. From 2014 to 2016, he was also an adjunct professor at the Queensland University of Technology (QUT) in Brisbane, Australia.

His research focuses primarily on behavioural economics, experimental economics, and economic psychology.

From 1 September 2016 to 11 January 2021, Kocher served as director of the Institute for Advanced Studies (IHS) in Vienna.

In June 2020, Kocher was appointed president of the Austrian Fiscal Advisory Council (Fiskalrat), succeeding Gottfried Haber. He was succeeded in this position by Christoph Badelt in May 2021.

In January 2021, Kocher was appointed Federal Minister of Labour, following the resignation of Christine Aschbacher. Initially sworn in as Minister for Labour, Family and Youth, his portfolio was restructured in February 2021 to focus on labour issues. During his tenure, he oversaw labour policy during the economic challenges caused by the COVID-19 pandemic and later assumed responsibility for economic affairs and digitalization in May 2022.

Following a ministerial reform in July 2022, the Ministry of Labour was merged with the Ministry for Digital and Economic Affairs, and Kocher was sworn in as Minister of Labour and the Economy. He left the government in March 2025 and returned to academia before he became Governor of the Austrian National Bank in September 2025.

== Academic work ==
Kocher is considered one of the leading behavioral and experimental economists in the German-speaking world. His research focuses on decision-making under uncertainty, cooperation, group behaviour, and labour market dynamics. His work has been published in leading journals such as the American Economic Review and Management Science.

== Political achievements ==
During his time in office, Kocher implemented several key reforms and initiatives aimed at strengthening the Austrian labour market and the Austrian economy:

The “Sprungbrett” (jump start) programme, launched in 2021, contributed significantly to reducing long-term unemployment, which had peaked during the COVID-19 crisis.

Austria saw record-high budgets for active labour market policies in his term.

The educational bonus (Bildungsbonus) was introduced as a permanent supplement to unemployment benefits for individuals in long-term skilling initiatives.

Young adults with disabilities were granted unrestricted access to labour market services.

The affirmative action funding quota for women in active labour market initiatives was increased from 3.5%- to 4%-points above the female unemployment rate.

The Brigitte Bierlein Prize for women under 35 was established to support young female professionals.

The FISA+ film funding model was introduced to modernize Austria’s film industry incentives.

A comprehensive reform of vocational education, known as “Höhere Berufliche Bildung” (higher vocational education) was implemented.

In response to the economic impact of the war in Ukraine since 2022 and the second Trump presidency (since January 2025), Austria has intensified efforts to support Austrian companies in diversifying their international trade relationships, signing cooperation agreements with countries such as India, Australia, Brazil, and Saudi Arabia.

== Personal life ==
Kocher is married and enjoys mountain climbing and marathon running. He grew up in Altenmarkt im Pongau in the province of Salzburg.

== Awards and honours ==
- 2000: Award of the Austrian Economic Association for Best Paper by a Young Economist
- 2003: Best Dissertation Award, University of Innsbruck
- 2003: Research Award of the Principality of Liechtenstein
- 2003: Research Award of the City of Innsbruck
- 2013: Bavarian Award for Excellence in Teaching
- 2025: Grand Decoration of Honour in Gold with Sash for Services to the Republic of Austria
