= Ministry for Digital and Economic Affairs =

Government ministry of Austria

Federal Ministry for Digital and Economic Affairs
- Bundesministerium für Digitalisierung und Wirtschaftsstandort
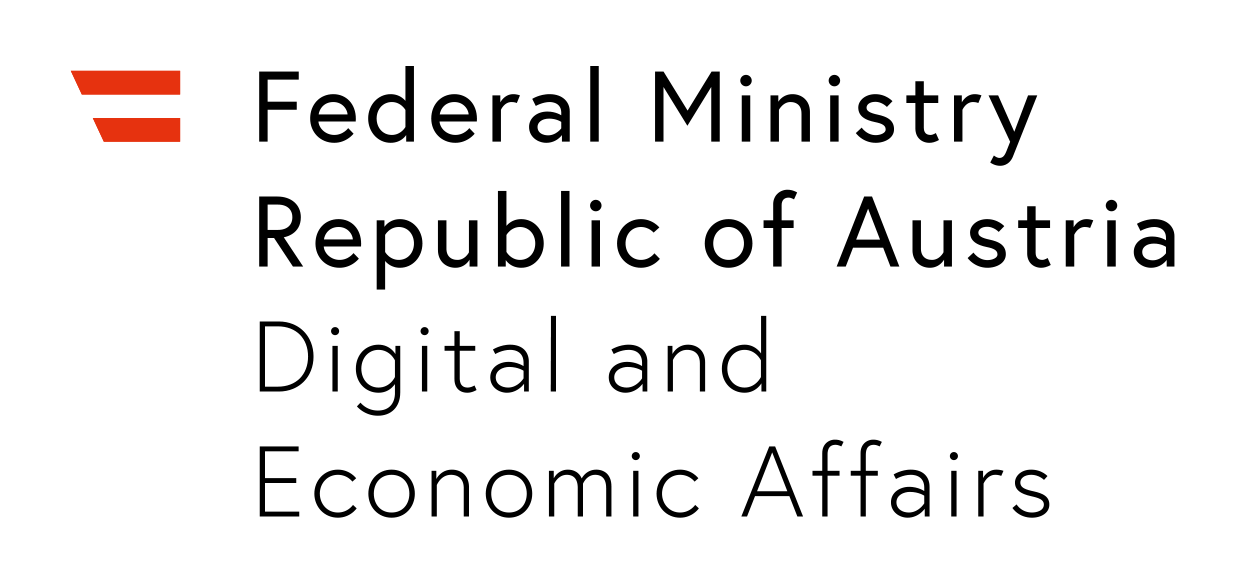

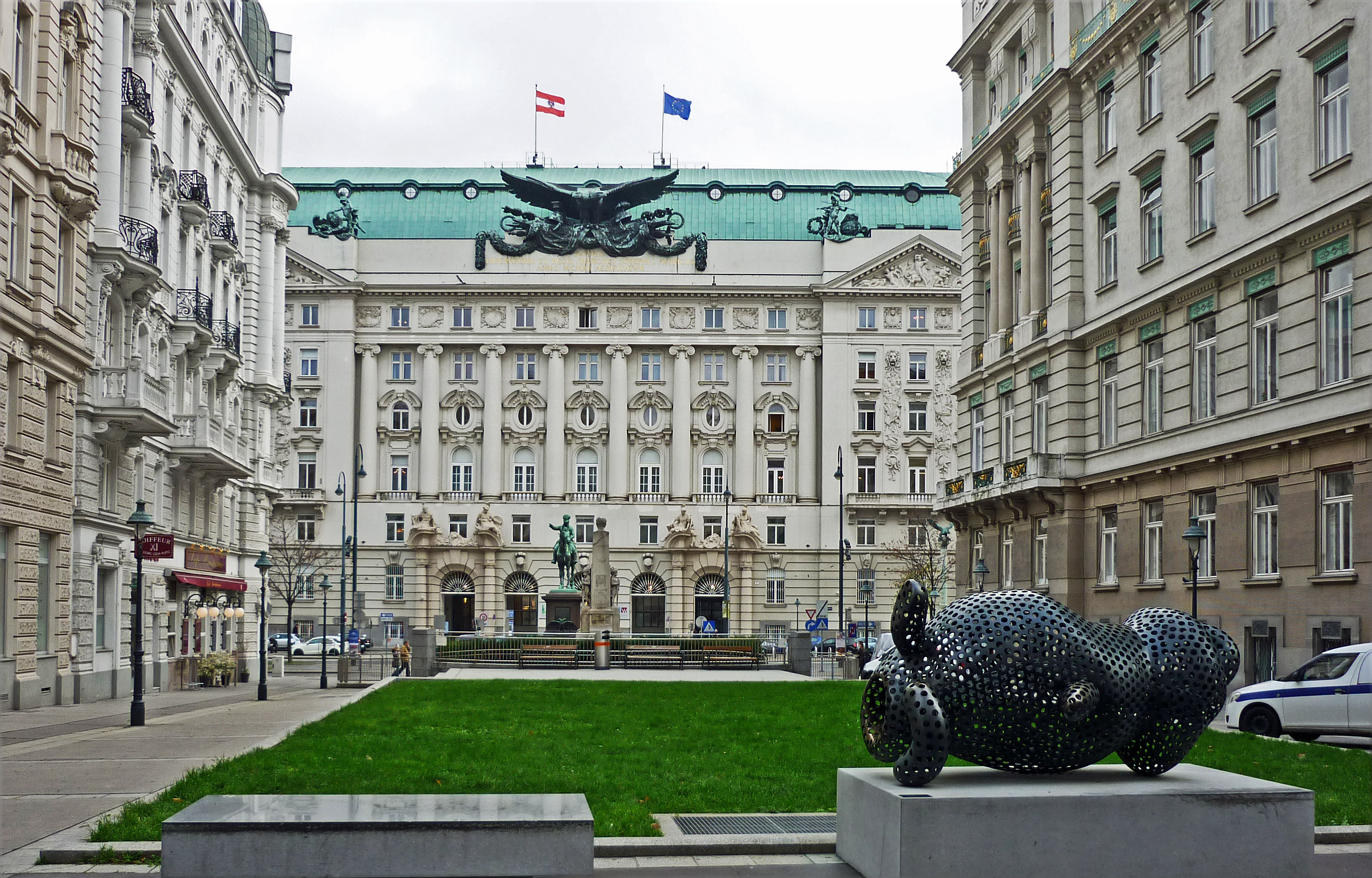

Ministry overview
- Formed: 1848
- Jurisdiction: Austria
- Headquarters: Stubenring 1 Vienna; 48°12′35″N 16°22′59″E
- Minister responsible: Wolfgang Hattmannsdorfer
- Website: bmdw.gv.at

In Austrian politics, the Federal Ministry for Digital and Economic Affairs (German: Bundesministerium für Digitalisierung und Wirtschaftsstandort) is the ministry in charge of promoting commerce and industry, overseeing public works, and maintaining the public infrastructure. In some recent cabinets, it has also been responsible for employment; in others, for family affairs and science.

Originally founded in 1848 as the Ministry for Commerce and Public Works (Ministerium für Handel und öffentliche Arbeiten), the institution's formal name of exact portfolio have undergone numerous changes over the years. As of 2018, the ministry is officially called the Ministry of Digital and Economic Affairs (Ministerium für Digitalisierung und Wirtschaftsstandort or BMDW).

== History ==
The Ministry of Economy was first established in the aftermath of the Revolutions of 1848 in the Austrian Empire as the Ministry for Commerce and Public Works (Ministerium für Handel und öffentliche Arbeiten). Over the course of the next several decades, its list of responsibilities gradually grew longer; its name changed several time to reflect the new reality. In 1918, following the collapse of the Austrian Empire in the final days of World War I, the ministry was briefly divided into a commerce department (Staatsamt für Gewerbe, Industrie und Handel) and a reconstruction department (Staatsamt für Kriegs- und Übergangswirtschaft). The two halves were reunited within the year. The Ministry went back to gradually acquiring new areas of responsibility and occasionally changing its name.

In 1967, the Ministry was split into a Ministry of Commerce and Industry (Ministerium für Handel, Gewerbe und Industrie) and a Ministry of Civil Engineering (Ministerium für Bauten und Technik); the latter assumed responsibility for managing public real estate and structures, roadworks, waterways, hydraulic engineering, water supply, sewerage, the promotion of housing construction, and engineering standardization, among other things. The split was undone in 1987.

In 2000, the Schüssel cabinet merged the Ministry of Economy with the Ministry of Labor. Road construction and maintenance and a number of minor matters were assigned to the Ministry of Traffic; waterways and hydraulic engineering went to the Ministry of Agriculture. The Ministry of Environment took over family affairs, becoming the Ministry of Social Affairs in the process. The merger was undone in 2008. The Ministry's current name and portfolio dates to 2018.

== Responsibilities ==
The Federal Ministry for Digital and Economic Affairs is responsible for:

- Trade and industry matters.
- Economic and structural policy matters in areas that fall within the competence of the Federal Ministry.
- Organization of the internal market.
- Matters of professional representation of the self-employed in the field of commerce, trade and industry.
- Matters of the Austrian representation at the World Trade Organization.
- Affairs of national economic defense, including the coordination of national economic defense.
- Administration of all federal buildings and real estate, including real estate used by federal institutions, insofar as they do not fall within the scope of another federal ministry.

== Structure ==
As of May 2018, the ministry consists of the Minister and his personal staff (Kabinett), the office of the director general, and nine departments:

- Information management (Abteilung Informationsmanagement)
- Public relations (Abteilung Presse, Öffentlichkeitsarbeit und Filmwirtschaft)
- Budget and administration (Bereich Budget und Administration)
- Human resources and legal (Bereich Personal und Recht)
- Economic policy, innovation, and technology (Center 1 – Wirtschaftspolitik, Innovation und Technologie)
- External economic relations policy and European integration (Center 2 - Außenwirtschaftspolitik und Europäische Integration)
- Enterprise policy (Sektion I Unternehmenspolitik)
- Historical buildings (Sektion II Historische Objekte)
- Digitalization, innovation, and electronic government (Sektion III Digitalisierung, Innovation und E-Government)

The Minister and his staff are political appointees; the general secretary and the section heads are career civil servants.
