= List of ministers of education (Austria) =

Minister of Education
- Bundesminister für Bildung
- Coat of arms
- Incumbent; Christoph Wiederkehr since 3 March 2025
- Ministry of Education
- Member of: Federal Government; Council of Ministers
- Nominator: Political parties
- Appointer: The president on advice of the chancellor
- Constituting instrument: Constitution of Austria
- First holder: Raphael Pacher first Republic; Ernst Fischer second Republic
- Website: Official website (in German)

The minister of education of Austria (German: Bundesminister für Bildung) heads the Ministry of Education.

== Ministers ==
=== First Republic ===
№	Portrait	Name (Born-Died)	Term			Political Party	Government
№	Portrait	Name (Born-Died)	Took office	Left office (Note: Based on when the successor took office)	Duration	Political Party	Government
State Secretariat of Education (Staatsamt für Unterricht)
1	Raphael Pacher [de]	Raphael Pacher (1857–1936)	30 October 1918	15 March 1919	136 days	DNP	Renner I Cabinet
State Secretariat of the Interior and Education (Staatsamt für Inneres und Unterricht)
2	Karl Renner	Karl Renner (1870–1950)	15 March 1919	9 May 1919	55 days	SDAPÖ	Renner II Cabinet
3	Matthias Eldersch	Matthias Eldersch (1869–1931)	9 May 1919	7 July 1920	1 year, 59 days	SDAPÖ	Renner II–III
4	Walter Breisky	Walter Breisky (1871–1944)	7 July 1920	20 November 1920	136 days	Independent	Mayr I Cabinet
Ministry of the Interior and Education (Bundesministerium für Inneres und Unterricht)
5	Egon Glanz [de]	Egon Glanz (1880–1945)	20 November 1920	7 April 1921	138 days	Independent	Mayr II Cabinet
–	Walter Breisky	Walter Breisky (1871–1944); Acting	7 April 1921	23 April 1921	16 days	Independent	Mayr II Cabinet
6	Rudolf Ramek	Rudolf Ramek (1881–1941)	23 April 1921	21 June 1921	59 days	CS	Mayr II Cabinet
7	Leopold Waber	Leopold Waber (1875–1945)	21 June 1921	16 January 1922	209 days	GDVP	Schober I Cabinet
–	Johann Schober	Johann Schober (1874–1932); Acting	16 January 1922	26 January 1922	10 days	Independent	Schober I Cabinet
–	Walter Breisky	Walter Breisky (1871–1944); Acting	26 January 1922	27 January 1922	1 day	Independent	Breisky Cabinet
–	Johann Schober	Johann Schober (1874–1932); Acting	27 January 1922	31 May 1922	124 days	Independent	Schober II Cabinet
8	Felix Frank	Felix Frank (1874–1932)	31 May 1922	17 April 1923	321 days	GDVP	Seipel I Cabinet
Ministry of Education (Bundesministerium für Unterricht)
9	Emil Schneider [de]	Emil Schneider (1883–1961)	17 April 1923	16 June 1926	3 years, 60 days	CS	Seipel II Cabinet–II; Ramek I Cabinet–II
10	Josef Resch [de]	Josef Resch (1880–1939); Acting	16 June 1926	25 June 1926	9 days	CS	Ramek II Cabinet
11	Anton Rintelen	Anton Rintelen (1876–1946)	25 June 1926	20 October 1926	117 days	CS	Ramek II Cabinet
12	Richard Schmitz	Richard Schmitz (1885–1954)	20 October 1926	4 May 1929	2 years, 196 days	CS	Seipel IV Cabinet–II
13	Emmerich Czermak [de]	Emmerich Czermak (1885–1965)	4 May 1929	26 September 1929	145 days	CS	Streeruwitz Cabinet
–	Johann Schober	Johann Schober (1874–1932); Acting	26 September 1929	16 October 1929	20 days	Independent	Schober III Cabinet
14	Heinrich von Srbik	Heinrich von Srbik (1878–1951)	16 October 1929	30 September 1930	349 days	Independent	Schober III Cabinet
(13)	Emmerich Czermak [de]	Emmerich Czermak (1885–1965)	30 September 1930	20 May 1932	1 year, 233 days	CS	Vaugoin Cabinet; Ender Cabinet; Buresch I Cabinet–II
(11)	Anton Rintelen	Anton Rintelen (1876–1946)	20 May 1932	24 May 1933	1 year, 4 days	CS	Dollfuss I Cabinet
–	Kurt Schuschnigg	Kurt Schuschnigg (1897–1977); Acting	24 May 1933	14 May 1936	2 years, 356 days	CS; VF	Dollfuss I Cabinet–II; Schuschnigg I Cabinet
15	Hans Pernter [de]	Hans Pernter (1887–1951)	14 May 1936	11 March 1938	1 year, 301 days	VF	Schuschnigg II Cabinet–II–III
16	Oswald Menghin	Oswald Menghin (1888–1973)	11 March 1938	13 March 1938	2 days	NSDAP	Seyss-Inquart Cabinet

=== Second Republic ===
№	Portrait	Name (Born-Died)	Term			Political Party	Government
№	Portrait	Name (Born-Died)	Took office	Left office	Duration	Political Party	Government
State Secretariat for Public Enlightenment, for Teaching and Education and for Cultural Affairs (Staatsamt für Volksaufklärung, für Unterricht und Erziehung und für Kultusangelegenheiten)
1	Ernst Fischer	Ernst Fischer (1899–1972)	27 April 1945	20 December 1945	237 days	KPÖ	Renner IV Cabinet
Ministry of Education (Bundesministerium für Unterricht)
2	Felix Hurdes [de]	Felix Hurdes (1901–1974)	20 December 1945	23 January 1952	6 years, 34 days	ÖVP	Figl I Cabinet–II
3	Ernst Kolb [de]	Ernst Kolb (1912–1978)	23 January 1952	1 November 1954	2 years, 282 days	ÖVP	Figl II Cabinet–II; Raab I Cabinet
4	Heinrich Drimmel [de]	Heinrich Drimmel (1912–1991)	1 November 1954	2 April 1964	9 years, 153 days	ÖVP	Raab I Cabinet–II–III–IV; Gorbach I Cabinet–II
5	Theodor Piffl-Percevic [de]	Theodor Piffl-Percevic (1911–1991)	2 April 1964	2 June 1969	5 years, 61 days	ÖVP	Klaus I Cabinet–II
6	Alois Mock	Alois Mock (1934–2017)	2 June 1969	21 April 1970	323 days	ÖVP	Klaus II Cabinet
7	Leopold Gratz	Leopold Gratz (1929–2006)	21 April 1970	24 July 1970	94 days	SPÖ	Kreisky I Cabinet
Ministry of Education and the Arts (Bundesministerium für Unterricht und Kunst)
7	Leopold Gratz	Leopold Gratz (1929–2006)	24 July 1970	4 November 1971	1 year, 103 days	SPÖ	Kreisky I Cabinet
8	Fred Sinowatz	Fred Sinowatz (1929–2008)	4 November 1971	5 June 1979	7 years, 213 days	SPÖ	Kreisky II Cabinet–II
–	Fred Sinowatz	Fred Sinowatz (1929–2008); Acting	5 June 1979	24 May 1983	3 years, 353 days	SPÖ	Kreisky IV Cabinet
9	Helmut Zilk	Helmut Zilk (1927–2008)	24 May 1983	10 September 1984	1 year, 109 days	SPÖ	Sinowatz Cabinet
10	Herbert Moritz [de]	Herbert Moritz (1927–2018)	10 September 1984	1 January 1985	113 days	SPÖ	Sinowatz Cabinet
Ministry of Education, the Arts and Sports (Bundesministerium für Unterricht, Kunst und Sport)
10	Herbert Moritz [de]	Herbert Moritz (1927–2018)	1 January 1985	21 January 1987	2 years, 20 days	SPÖ	Sinowatz Cabinet; Vranitzky I Cabinet
11	Hilde Hawlicek	Hilde Hawlicek (born 1942)	21 January 1987	17 December 1990	3 years, 330 days	SPÖ	Vranitzky II Cabinet
12	Rudolf Scholten [de]	Rudolf Scholten (born 1955)	17 December 1990	1 February 1991	46 days	SPÖ	Vranitzky III Cabinet
Ministry of Education and the Arts (Bundesministerium für Unterricht und Kunst)
12	Rudolf Scholten [de]	Rudolf Scholten (born 1955)	1 February 1991	29 November 1994	3 years, 301 days	SPÖ	Vranitzky III Cabinet
13	Erhard Busek	Erhard Busek (1941–2022)	29 November 1994	1 January 1995	33 days	SPÖ	Vranitzky IV Cabinet
Ministry of Education and Cultural Affairs (Bundesministerium für Unterricht und kulturelle Angelegenheiten)
13	Erhard Busek	Erhard Busek (1941–2022)	1 January 1995	4 May 1995	123 days	SPÖ	Vranitzky IV Cabinet
14	Elisabeth Gehrer	Elisabeth Gehrer (born 1942)	4 May 1995	1 April 2000	4 years, 333 days	ÖVP	Vranitzky IV Cabinet–II; Klima Cabinet; Schüssel I Cabinet
Ministry of Education, Science and Cultural Affairs (Bundesministerium für Bildung, Wissenschaft und Kultur)
14	Elisabeth Gehrer	Elisabeth Gehrer (born 1942)	1 April 2000	11 January 2007	6 years, 285 days	ÖVP	Schüssel I Cabinet–II
15	Claudia Schmied	Claudia Schmied (born 1959)	11 January 2007	1 March 2007	49 days	SPÖ	Gusenbauer Cabinet
Ministry of Education, the Arts and Cultural Affairs (Bundesministerium für Unterricht, Kunst und Kultur)
15	Claudia Schmied	Claudia Schmied (born 1959)	1 March 2007	16 December 2013	6 years, 290 days	SPÖ	Gusenbauer Cabinet; Faymann I Cabinet
16	Gabriele Heinisch-Hosek	Gabriele Heinisch-Hosek (born 1961)	16 December 2013	1 March 2014	75 days	SPÖ	Faymann II Cabinet
Ministry of Education and Women's Affairs (Bundesministerium für Bildung und Frauen)
16	Gabriele Heinisch-Hosek	Gabriele Heinisch-Hosek (born 1961)	1 March 2014	17 May 2016	2 years, 77 days	SPÖ	Faymann II Cabinet
17	Sonja Hammerschmid	Sonja Hammerschmid (born 1968)	17 May 2016	1 July 2016	45 days	SPÖ	Kern Cabinet
Ministry of Education (Bundesministerium für Bildung)
17	Sonja Hammerschmid	Sonja Hammerschmid (born 1968)	1 July 2016	18 December 2017	1 year, 170 days	SPÖ	Kern Cabinet
18	Heinz Faßmann	Heinz Faßmann (born 1955)	18 December 2017	8 January 2018	21 days	Independent	Kurz I Cabinet
Ministry of Education, Science and Research (Bundesministerium für Bildung, Wissenschaft und Forschung)
18	Heinz Faßmann	Heinz Faßmann (born 1955)	8 January 2018	3 June 2019	1 year, 146 days	Independent	Kurz I Cabinet
19	Iris Rauskala	Iris Rauskala (born 1955)	3 June 2019	7 January 2020	218 days	Independent	Bierlein Cabinet
(18)	Heinz Faßmann	Heinz Faßmann (born 1955)	7 January 2020	6 December 2021	1 year, 333 days	Independent	Kurz II Cabinet; Schallenberg Cabinet
20	Martin Polaschek	Martin Polaschek (born 1965)	6 December 2021	3 March 2025	3 years, 87 days	Independent	Nehammer Cabinet
21	Christoph Wiederkehr	Christoph Wiederkehr (born 1990)	3 March 2025	Incumbent	1 year, 188 days	NEOS	Stocker Cabinet

== See also ==
- Ministry of Education (Austria)
