= LGBTQ rights in Austria =

- Location of Austria (dark green) – in Europe (light green & dark grey) – in the European Union (light green) – [Legend]
- Legal status: Legal since 1971, age of consent equalized in 2002
- Gender identity: Transgender people allowed to change gender; surgery not required
- Military: LGBT people allowed to serve
- Discrimination protections: Yes, discrimination protections since 2004 for employment and 2017 for the provision of goods and services (see below)

Family rights
- Recognition of relationships: Unregistered cohabitation since 2003, Registered partnership since 2010, Same-sex marriage since 2019
- Adoption: Full adoption rights since 2016

Lesbian, gay, bisexual, transgender, and queer (LGBTQ) rights in Austria have advanced significantly in the 21st century, and are now considered generally progressive. Both male and female forms of same-sex sexual activity are legal in Austria. Registered partnerships were introduced in 2010, giving same-sex couples some of the rights of marriage. Stepchild adoption was legalised in 2013, while full joint adoption was legalised by the Constitutional Court of Austria in 2016. On 5 December 2017, the Austrian Constitutional Court decided to legalise same-sex marriage, and the ruling went into effect on 1 January 2019.

The country, while influenced by Roman Catholicism, has become more liberal with laws and social opinions concerning sexual orientation and gender identity over time. However, there are still many LGBT minorities who think that being different is a problem. In June 2019, Minister of Education, Science and Research Iris Eliisa Rauskala became the first government minister to come out as lesbian.

Austrian President Alexander Van der Bellen supports LGBT rights and said they are human rights. In 2019, he became the first head of state to take part in the EuroPride parade in Vienna.

== Law regarding same-sex sexual activity ==
In 1770, the Constitutio Criminalis Theresiana, the first unified criminal law for the Habsburg hereditary lands, criminalized various sexual acts, including sodomy. Offenders were subject to decapitation and burning, and sometimes branding. However, same-sex acts were not consistently pursued, and Maria Theresa had the authority to grant pardons.

In 1787, Joseph II reformed the law, introducing milder punishments. Although the death penalty for homosexuality was officially abolished, it was replaced with forced labor, including the brutal practice of ship pulling.

In 1803, a new criminal law abolished ship pulling for homosexuals, substituting it with imprisonment for six months to one year.

The criminal code underwent several amendments until 1852 when impropriety against nature was still punishable, with increased imprisonment from one to five years.

Legal interpretations evolved over time, initially exempting certain acts but later broadening the scope to include all immoral acts with a person of the same sex.

Following the "Anschluss," Section 129 Ib of the 1852 Criminal Code was retained. Thus, unlike in Germany, lesbianism remained a crime in Austria. In 1940, a court ruling aligned the Austrian law with the 1935 version of Paragraph 175, increasing prosecution and criminal penalties.

In 1971, an amendment to the Penal Code decriminalised non-commercial same-sex sexual acts between adults, while at the same time introducing a new provision (Section 209), which set the age of consent for gay male sex at 18, 4 years higher than the lesbian and heterosexual age of consent, which was instead set at 14.

On 10 July 2002, Parliament passed a law formally repealing Section 209, which had already been declared unconstitutional and unenforceable by the Constitutional Court of Austria on 2 June 2002.

In 2003, the European Court of Human Rights ruled in S. L. v. Austria that setting an unequal age of consent was incompatible with the Convention; the case had been brought before the Court prior to the repeal of Paragraph 209.

Despite widespread support to set up an "expungement or compensation scheme" for old historical gay sex criminal records, as of July 2020, the government of Austria has not implemented it yet.

== Recognition of same-sex relationships ==
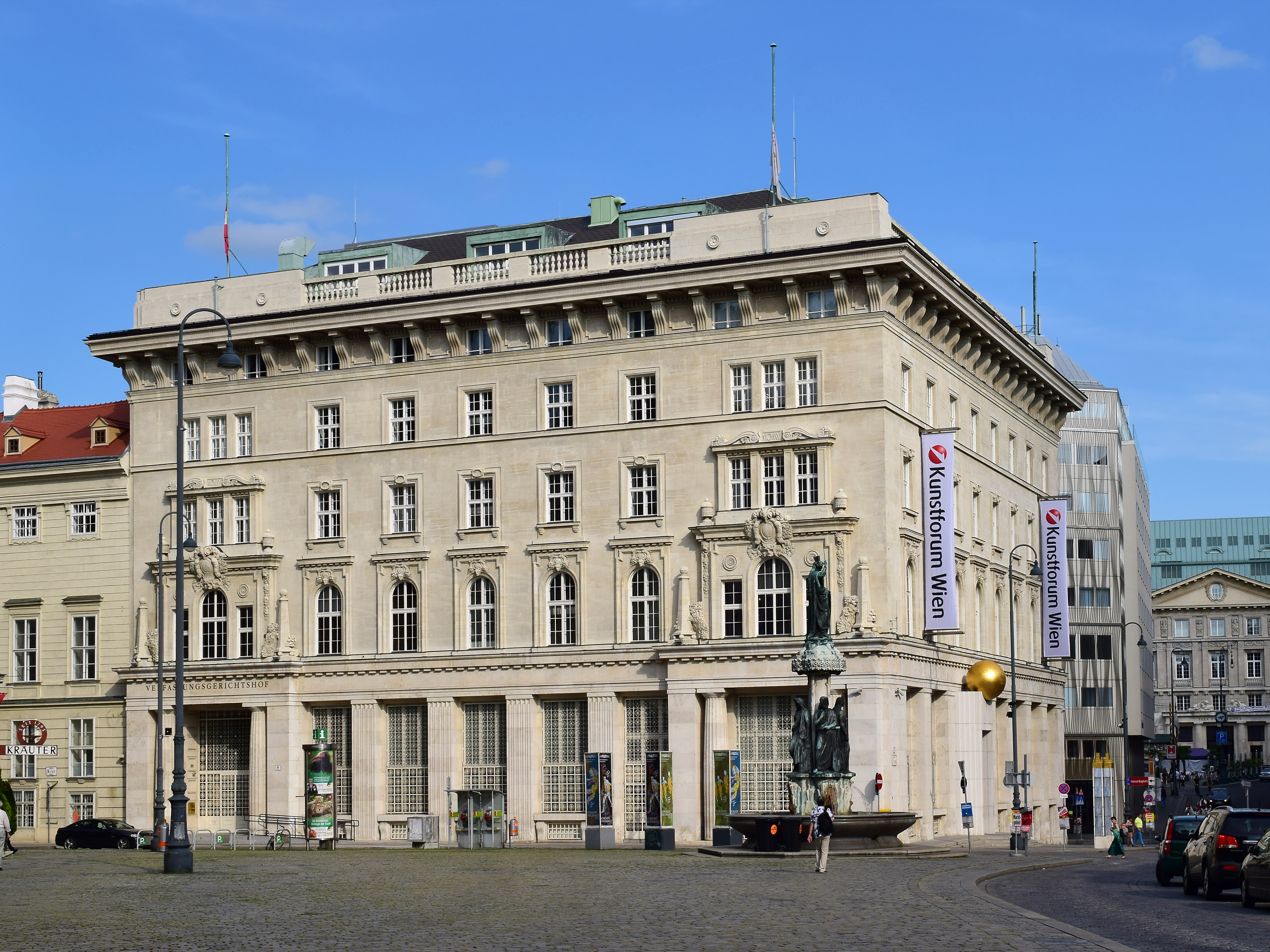
The Austrian Constitutional Court (Verfassungsgerichtshof) has issued multiple landmark LGBT rulings, including the 2017 ruling legalising same-sex marriage.

Following the ruling of the European Court of Human Rights in Karner v. Austria in 2003, cohabitating same-sex couples were given the same rights as cohabitating opposite-sex couples.

First planned in 2007, registered partnerships have been legal in Austria since 1 January 2010.

Before the Constitutional Court decided to legalize same-sex marriage, the Austrian Government had not legalised same-sex marriage due to opposition by the Austrian People's Party (ÖVP). The Greens had however introduced a bill in Parliament, and in 2015 a citizens' initiative "Ehe Gleich!" was set up to petition the Parliament to consider the legalisation of same-sex marriage. They also filed a lawsuit challenging the current law; however, it was dismissed by a lower court. A second lawsuit was heard on 21 March 2016 in Linz. On 15 April 2016, a court dismissed the case as well.

On 5 December 2017, the Constitutional Court struck down the ban on same-sex marriage as unconstitutional. The ruling would take effect on 1 January 2019, though the plaintiffs in the court case were allowed to marry prior to that date. In January 2018, the new ÖVP-Chancellor, Sebastian Kurz, said on national television that his new Government will respect the ruling by the Constitutional Court. As legislators took no steps to legalise same-sex marriage before the deadline, same-sex marriage became legal on 1 January 2019.

== Adoption and parenting ==
On 19 February 2013, the European Court of Human Rights ruled in X and Others v. Austria that a partner in a same-sex union has the right to adopt their partner's biological child. On 4 July 2013, the Austrian Parliament passed a government bill that allows stepchild adoption by same-sex couples. The law entered into force on 1 August 2013.

In January 2015, the Constitutional Court found the existing laws on adoption to be unconstitutional and ordered the laws to be changed by 31 December 2015 to allow joint adoption by same-sex couples. On 30 October 2015, the Justice Minister announced that the ban would no longer be enforced starting on 1 January 2016, thus allowing the Court's decision to automatically cancel the joint adoption ban.

Additionally, lesbian couples can get access to artificial insemination and IVF treatments.

In October 2018, in a case concerning adoption issues following the end of a relationship, the Austrian Constitutional Court ruled that same-sex couples must be treated the same way as opposite-sex couples. It decided that the non-biological mother should be fully recognized as a parent, through way of an adoption, and enjoy the same rights, treatment and obligations as a heterosexual father would, even if the couple has separated. The children's best interest must be taken and guaranteed in every adoption process, the court ruled.

== Discrimination protections ==
The Equal Treatment Act (German: Gleichbehandlungsgesetz) has included anti-discrimination protections on the basis of sexual orientation in employment since 2004, to follow the implementation of EU legislation prohibiting discrimination on that ground. Gender identity and intersex status are not explicitly included, but are perceived as being covered under "gender". In January 2017, Lower Austria became the last Austrian state (Bundesland) to update its anti-discrimination laws to cover sexual orientation in the provision of goods and services. Every other state had already established anti-discrimination laws covering sexual orientation.

The 1993 Security Police Act (German: Sicherheitspolizeigesetz) requires the police to refrain from any actions that could create the impression of bias or that could be perceived as discrimination on the grounds of sexual orientation. In addition, the city of Bludenz adopted a symbolic non-discrimination declaration which includes sexual orientation in 1998. Although the Federal Constitution protects all citizens equally and prohibits discrimination, sexual orientation is not explicitly included.

In 2015, the Austrian Parliament approved amendments to the Criminal Code, making it an aggravating sentence to commit a crime on account of the victim's sexual orientation and banning hate speech on the basis of sexual orientation. The changes went into effect on 1 January 2016.

== Gender identity and expression ==
Transgender people in Austria are allowed to change their legal gender and name so that they match their gender identity. They are not obliged to undergo sex reassignment surgery beforehand. The legal change of gender and name is bound to submission of psychiatric opinion though – so is the payment of sex-change treatment by public health insurance bound to submission of various psychiatric opinions.

The use of puberty blockers in youth experiencing gender dysphoria has been endorsed by the following organizations:

- Österreichische Gesellschaft für Kinder- und Jugendpsychiatrie (Austrian Society for Child and Adolescent Psychiatry) (ÖGKJP)
- Österreichische Gesellschaft für Gynäkologie und Geburtshilfe (Austrian Society of Gynecology and Obstetrics) (OEGGG)

== Intersex rights ==
On 14 March 2018, the Constitutional Court preliminarily ruled that intersex people, who are biologically neither male nor female, can choose to have their entry in the birth registry left blank or changed to "inter", "other" or "X". In May 2019, as a result of the ruling, Austrian intersex activist Alex Jürgen was issued documents featuring a third gender option. The Court also ruled that intersex medical interventions are not constitutional and should be avoided as much as possible. It ruled that such medical interventions could only be justified in exceptional cases, such as in life-threatening cases. The final judgment was published on 29 June 2018, and entered into force immediately.

In July 2020, the first intersex birth certificate was legally recognised and issued to an individual person within Austria.

== Military service ==
Austria permits LGBT people to serve openly in the Austrian Armed Forces.

As of 2014, Austria allowed transgender people to serve openly in its military forces. The policy of inclusion was reportedly still in effect in 2017.

== Conversion therapy ==
In June and July 2018, LGBT association HOSI Salzburg criticised the ultra-conservative Christian association "TeenSTAR" for claiming that "Homosexuality is considered an identity problem and 'aberration'". The group offered minors conversion therapy classes by teaching them that sexual orientation was "changeable" through a combination of therapy, self-help groups and pastoral care, as reported by the Salzburger Nachrichten newspaper. Member of the National Council Mario Lindner (SPÖ) made a parliamentary request to former Minister of Education Heinz Faßmann on the allegations; another parliamentary question was launched by Member of the National Council Ewa Dziedzic (Greens). In October 2018, the Education Directorate Salzburg banned TeenSTAR workshops until the result of the review. Although the Ministry of Education announced a ban on the association, and a decree by Christmas 2018, as of February 2019, no decree had been published, and TeenSTAR continued to work in schools. In April, the association was finally banned.

In December 2018, a resolution calling for a ban on conversion therapy on minors was submitted to Parliament by SPÖ equal treatment spokesman Mario Lindner. A vote was initially prevented and delayed by the ruling ÖVP and FPÖ coalition. However, on 13 June 2019, in a preliminary vote, the National Council approved the resolution. The Social Democratic Party of Austria (SPÖ), NEOS – The New Austria and Liberal Forum (NEOS) JETZT – Pilz List (JETZT), the two independent members and the Austrian People's Party (ÖVP) all voted for the resolution; with the Freedom Party of Austria (FPÖ) opposing. On 2 July 2019, the National Council approved the resolution in a final vote. In this vote, the FPÖ also agreed, on the grounds that children and adolescents should always be given priority protection. The resolution calls on the Government of Austria to "immediately submit to the Federal Council a government bill banning the use of conversion and reparative therapies on minors" by setting a deadline before summer.

== Living conditions ==
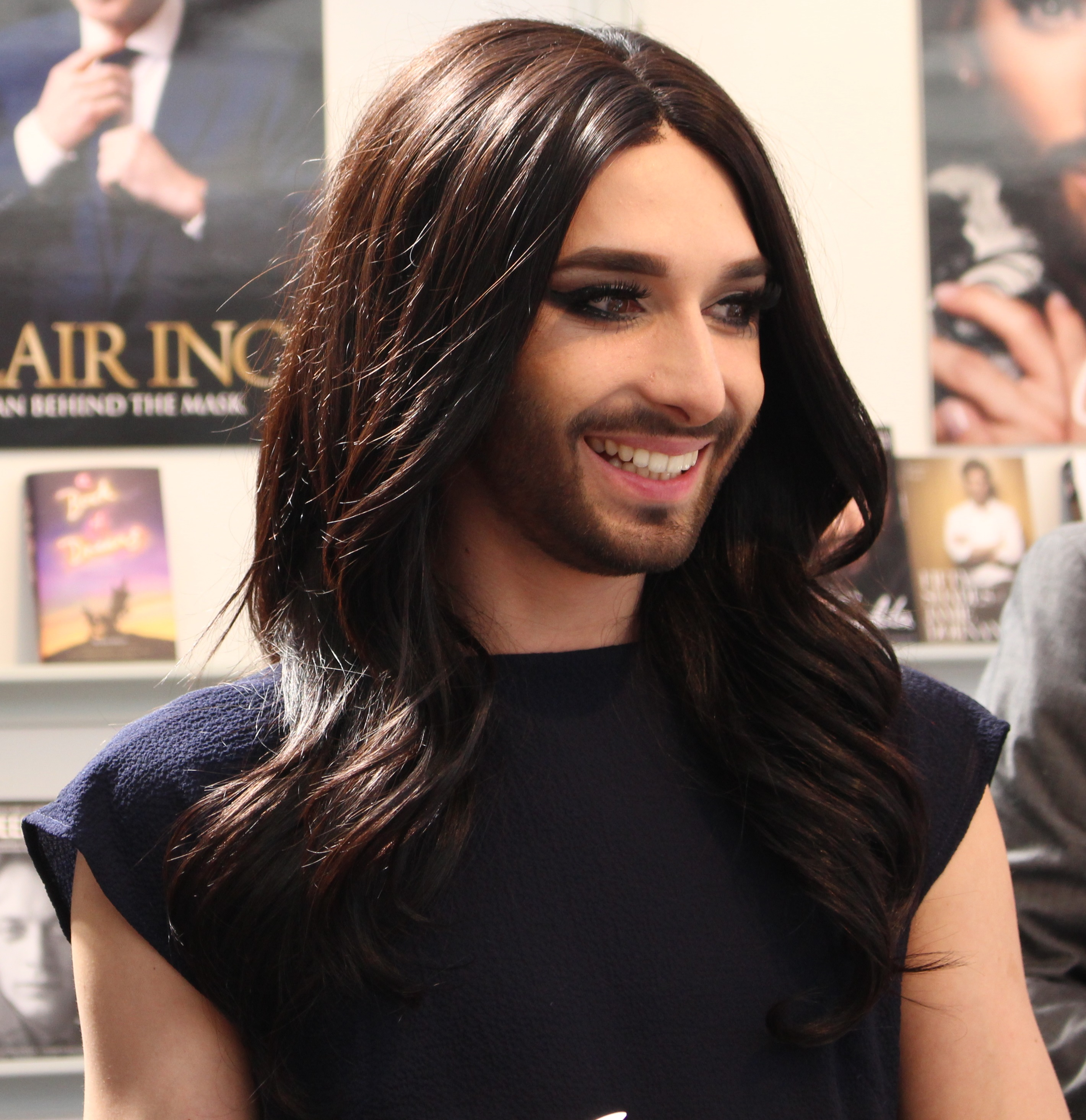
Austrian drag queen Conchita Wurst won the Eurovision Song Contest 2014.

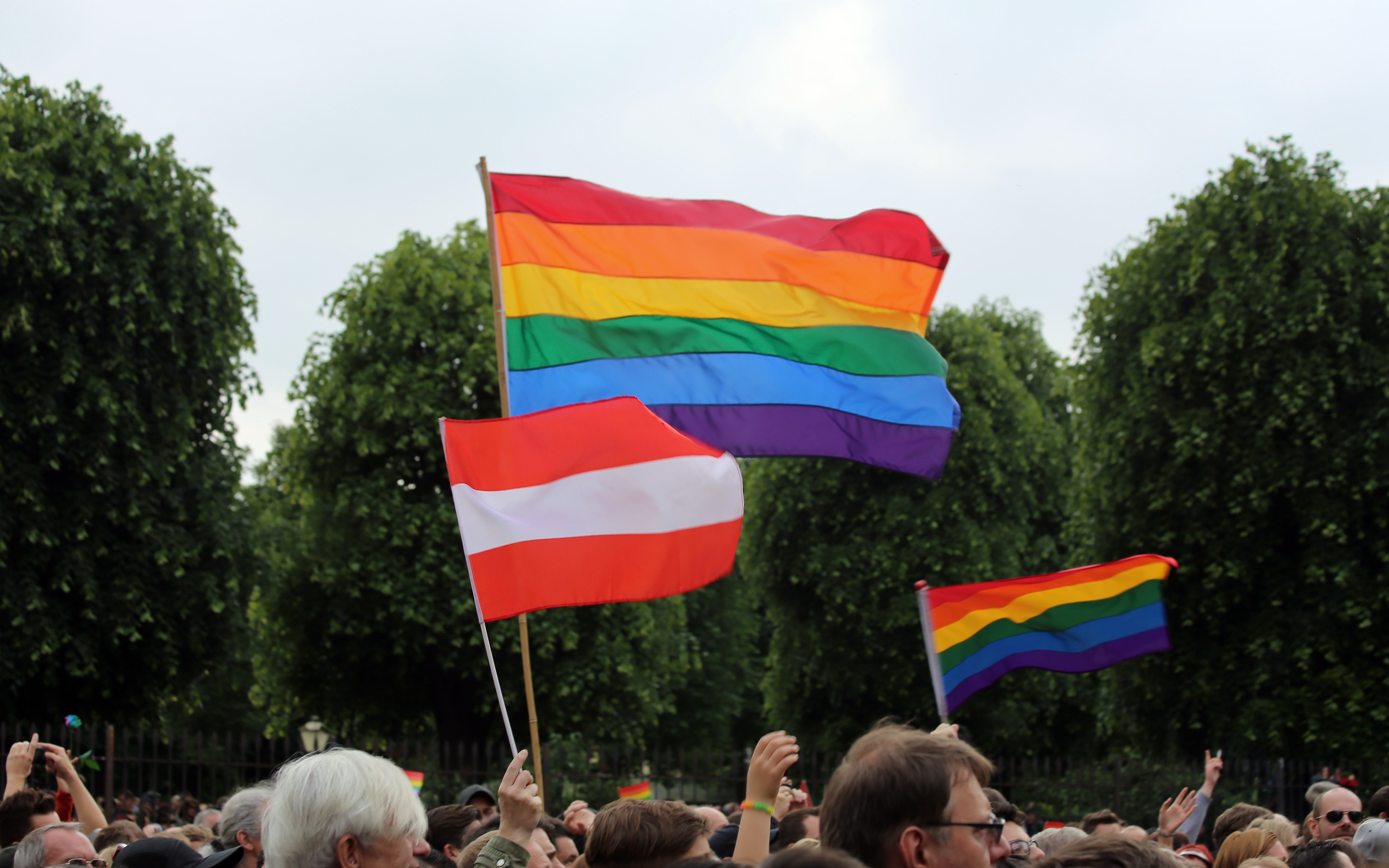
LGBT pride rainbow flags and the Austrian flag at one of Conchita Wurst's concerts in 2014

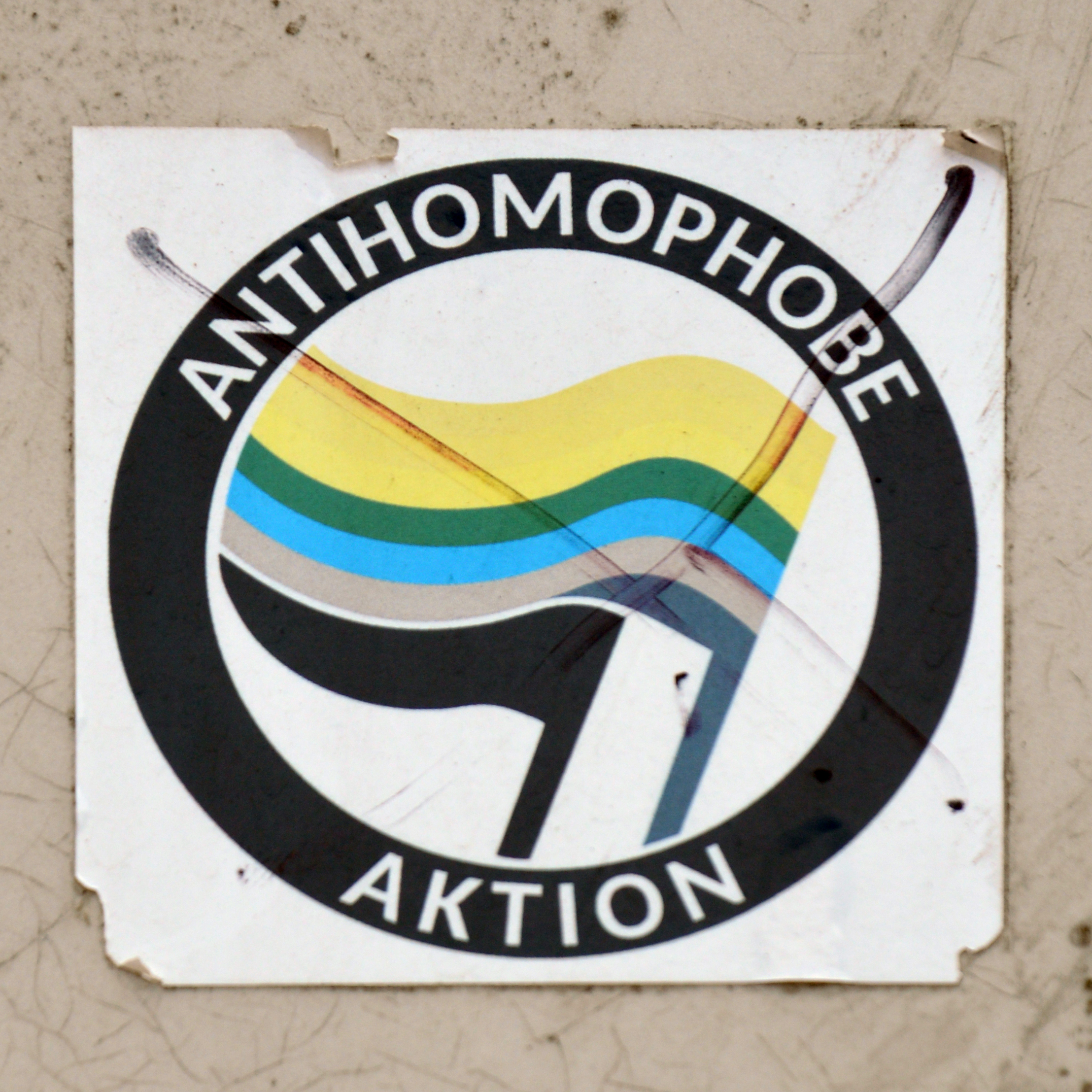
Political sticker of the "Antihomophobe Aktion", 2023.

=== Politics ===
In 1995, the International Human Rights Tribunal instigated the political discussion about the discrimination and persecution of LGBT persons in Austria. The first major parliamentary debates on that issue took place thereafter, initiated by the Liberal Forum (LIF) which was campaigning strongly against discrimination of homosexuals, which at that time existed through section 209 of the Austrian Penal Code, and for complete equality of treatment also including marriage and adoption. Section 209 set a higher age of consent for gay men, at 18 (4 years higher than the age of consent for heterosexuals and lesbians, which was set at 14). The Social Democrats (SPÖ) and the Green Party at that time showed support for the issue of equal treatment of same-sex couples.

After the LIF did not pass the four percent electoral threshold in the 1999 elections, the Social Democrats and the Green Party started to embrace this issue more. The SPÖ on its biannual Federal Party Convention made a decision on the issue of equal treatment of same-sex couples. They proposed a model of registered partnership ("Eingetragene Partnerschaft") including stepchild adoption. The Austrian Green Party proposed the civil pact ("Zivilpakt") as a somewhat similar model to that of the Social Democrats in 2004.

However, progress was visible to a limited extent. Since 1998, Austria has recognized the right not to testify against their partner if the partner is of the same sex, as amended in the Criminal Code. In June 2002, the Constitutional Court rescinded section 209 of the Criminal Code, which led to the introduction of section 207b as a substitute by the coalition of the conservative ÖVP and the right-wing FPÖ. Section 207b lowered the age of consent for all regardless of sexual orientation to 14 with a close in age exemption of 3 years. It also prohibits corrupting a minor under 16 to have sexual relations. Following the 2003 decision of the European Court of Human Rights in the case of Karner v Austria, cohabiting same-sex partners are entitled to the same rights as unmarried cohabiting opposite-sex partners. In 2005, the Green Party campaigned heavily for registered partnerships during the Vienna election campaign in 2005. On 26 July 2006, the first legal same-sex marriage was conducted, when Angelika Frasl, a transsexual woman with two children, was permitted by the Constitutional Court to change her legal gender to female while remaining married to her wife.

Karin Gastinger, the then Minister of Justice and a former member of the centre-right Alliance for the Future of Austria, had fought for gay and lesbian couples to get rights to partners' estates and medical care in December 2005. However, her case was ultimately unsuccessful.

It was not thought likely that the coalition of Conservatives and Social Democrats formed in 2007 would result in major steps towards more equality quickly. Although the then Minister of Justice, Maria Berger, a Social Democrat, intended to improve the situation, she herself expected huge opposition by the conservative coalition partner ÖVP, most likely because her situation was similar to that of her predecessor Gastinger.

Furthermore, Maria Fekter, former chairperson of the parliamentary committee for the judiciary, and former Minister of the Interior, repeatedly announced her opposition to registered same-sex partnerships and that conservative values would prevail. Though, despite such opposition, partnerships were approved in December 2009.

Other, more conservative, political parties include the Austrian People's Party and the Freedom Party tend to oppose LGBT rights.

==== Openly LGBT politicians ====
Openly LGBT politicians in Austria include Ulrike Lunacek, former Greens leader and the Vice-President of the European Parliament. Lunacek was elected to the National Council in 1999, remaining a member until 2009. In 2009, she became the first openly lesbian MEP. She retired from politics in 2020. In 2017, Mario Lindner (SPÖ) became the first openly gay politician to be elected to the National Council. Gerald Grosz, member of the National Council between 2008 and 2013 and the party leader of the Alliance for the Future of Austria between 2013 and 2015, came out as gay in 2013 just before his retirement from politics in 2015. Member of the Federal Council Ewa Dziedzic (Greens) and member of the Gemeinderat and Landtag of Vienna Faika El-Nagashi (Greens) are both lesbians. In April 2019, Georg Djundja (SPÖ) was elected as the first openly gay mayor in Austria, of the city of Oberndorf bei Salzburg.

In June 2019, Minister of Education, Science and Research Iris Eliisa Rauskala came out as lesbian and announced that she is married to a woman, becoming the first openly LGBT minister in the Government of Austria.

Since the 2019 National Election seven politicians in the National Council are openly gay. With four politicians (Ewa Dziedzic, Faika El-Nagashi, David Stögmüller and Meri Disoski) the Green party has the highest number of LGBT representatives. Beside Yannick Shetty from the liberal party NEOS – Das Neue Österreich, there are also two openly gay politicians from the conservative Austrian People's Party: Nico Marchetti and Martina Kaufmann.

=== Controversies ===
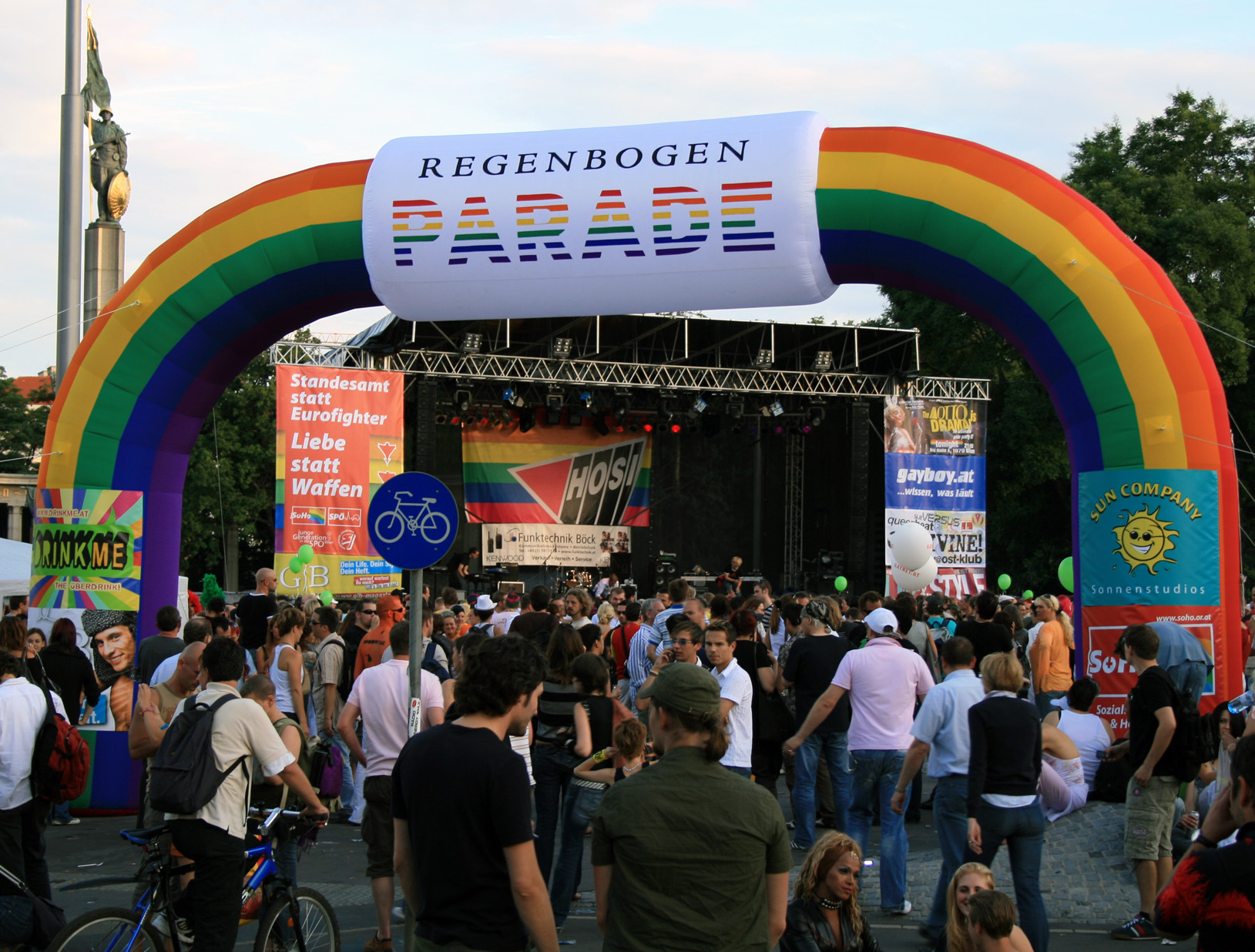
Regenbogenparade ('Rainbow Parade') in 2007

Much speculation has been made about the sexual orientation of Jörg Haider, who took control of the right-wing Freedom Party in 1986 and then later created the more mainstream but still socially conservative Alliance for the Future of Austria. The controversy continued after Haider's death in an accident on 11 October 2008. In 2009, some Austrian publications were forbidden by a court injunction for "breach of personal and privacy rights of Dr Jörg Haider", and thus from making claims that Jörg Haider was not heterosexual.

=== Gay community ===
The gay community is developed in all larger cities, such as Vienna, Linz, Innsbruck, Salzburg and Graz. Every year, the Austrian capital hosts Vienna Gay Pride, which includes the Regenbogenparade, the "Rainbow Parade".

=== LGBT rights organisations ===
Major LGBT organisations include HOSI Wien, which was founded in 1979 and is Austria's oldest and largest gay, lesbian and bisexual association, The Austrian Lesbian and Gay Forum (ALGF), which was active throughout the 1990s, and Afro Rainbow Austria (ARA), the first organisation by and for LGBT migrants from Africa in Austria.

== Public opinion ==
The 2023 Eurobarometer found that 65% of Austrians thought same-sex marriage should be allowed throughout Europe, and 66% agreed that "there is nothing wrong in a sexual relationship between two persons of the same sex".

== Summary table ==
Right	Status
Same-sex sexual activity legal	Yes (Since 1971)
Equal age of consent (14)	Yes (Since 2002)
Anti-discrimination laws in employment	Yes (Since 2004)
Anti-discrimination laws in the provision of goods and services	Yes (Nationwide since 2017)
Anti-discrimination laws in all other areas (incl. indirect discrimination, hate speech)	Yes (Since 2016)
Anti-discrimination laws concerning gender identity	Yes (Since 2004)
Same-sex civil unions	Yes (Since 2010)
Same-sex marriage	Yes (Since 2019)
Recognition of same-sex couples (e.g. unregistered cohabitation, life partnership)	Yes (Since 2003)
Stepchild adoption by same-sex couples	Yes (Since 2013)
Joint adoption by same-sex couples	Yes (Since 2016)
Adoption by single people regardless of sexual orientation	Yes
Automatic parenthood on birth certificates for children of same-sex couples	Yes
LGBT people allowed to serve openly in the military	Yes
Right to change legal gender	Yes (Since 2009)
Third gender option	Yes (Since 2018)
Gender self-identification	
Access to IVF for lesbian couples	Yes (Since 2014)
Conversion therapy banned by law	No (Pending)
Intersex minors protected from invasive surgical procedures	Yes (Since 2018)
Homosexuality declassified as an illness	Yes (Since the official adaption of ICD-10 in 1993)
Commercial surrogacy for gay male couples	No (Illegal for all couples regardless of sexual orientation)
MSMs allowed to donate blood	Yes (Since 2022)

== See also ==
- Human rights in Austria
- LGBT rights in the European Union
- LGBT rights in Europe
