= Dollfuss government =

Dollfuss government may refer to:

- First Dollfuss government
- Second Dollfuss government
