= Second Dollfuss government =

- 23rd government of Austria

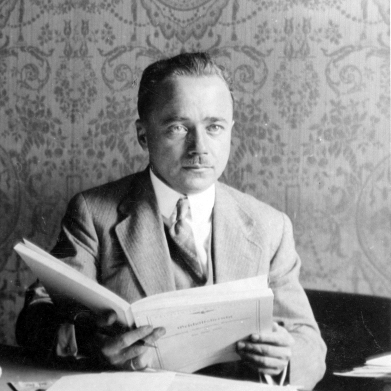
- Dollfuss c. 1930
- Date formed: 21 September 1933
- Date dissolved: 25 July 1934

People and organisations
- President: Wilhelm Miklas
- Chancellor: Engelbert Dollfuss
- Vice-Chancellor: Emil Fey; Ernst Rüdiger Starhemberg

History
- Predecessor: Dollfuss I
- Successor: Schuschnigg I

The Second Dollfuss government was the cabinet of Austria under Chancellor Engelbert Dollfuss from 21 September 1933 to 25 July 1934. The government ended following the assassination of Dollfuss.

== Ministers ==
Portfolio	Minister	Took office	Left office
Federal Chancellery
Federal Chancellor; Acting Minister of Foreign Affairs; Acting minister for Agriculture and Forestry	Engelbert Dolfuss	21 September 1933	25 July 1934
Vice-Chancellor	Emil Fey	21 September 1933	1 May 1934
Vice-Chancellor entrusted with the factual management of matters of physical training	Ernst Rüdiger Starhemberg	1 May 1934	14 May 1936
Federal Minister entrusted with the factual management of the affairs of constitutional and administrative reform	Otto Ender	23 September 1933	10 July 1934
Federal Minister entrusted the factual management of the affairs of the internal administration	Robert Kerber	23 September 1933	10 July 1934
Federal Minister	Richard Schmitz	16 February 1934	10 July 1934
Ministers
Minister of Finance	Karl Buresch	16 May 1933	17 October 1935
Minister of Commerce and Communications	Fritz Stockinger	10 May 1933	3 November 1936
Minister of Justice	Kurt Schuschnigg	29 January 1932	10 July 1934
Minister of Justice	Egon Berger-Waldenegg	10 July 1934	29 July 1934
Minister of Education	Kurt Schuschnigg	24 May 1933	14 May 1936
Minister of Social Administration	Richard Schmitz	21 September 1933	16 February 1934
Minister of Social Administration	Odo Neustädter-Stürmer	16 February 1934	17 October 1935
Minister of Defence	Engelbert Dolfuss (Acting)	21 September 1933	12 March 1934
Minister of Defence	Alois Schönburg-Hartenstein	12 March 1934	10 July 1934
Minister of Defence	Engelbert Dolfuss (Acting)	10 July 1934	25 July 1934
