= Elisabeth Gehrer =

Austrian politician (born 1942)

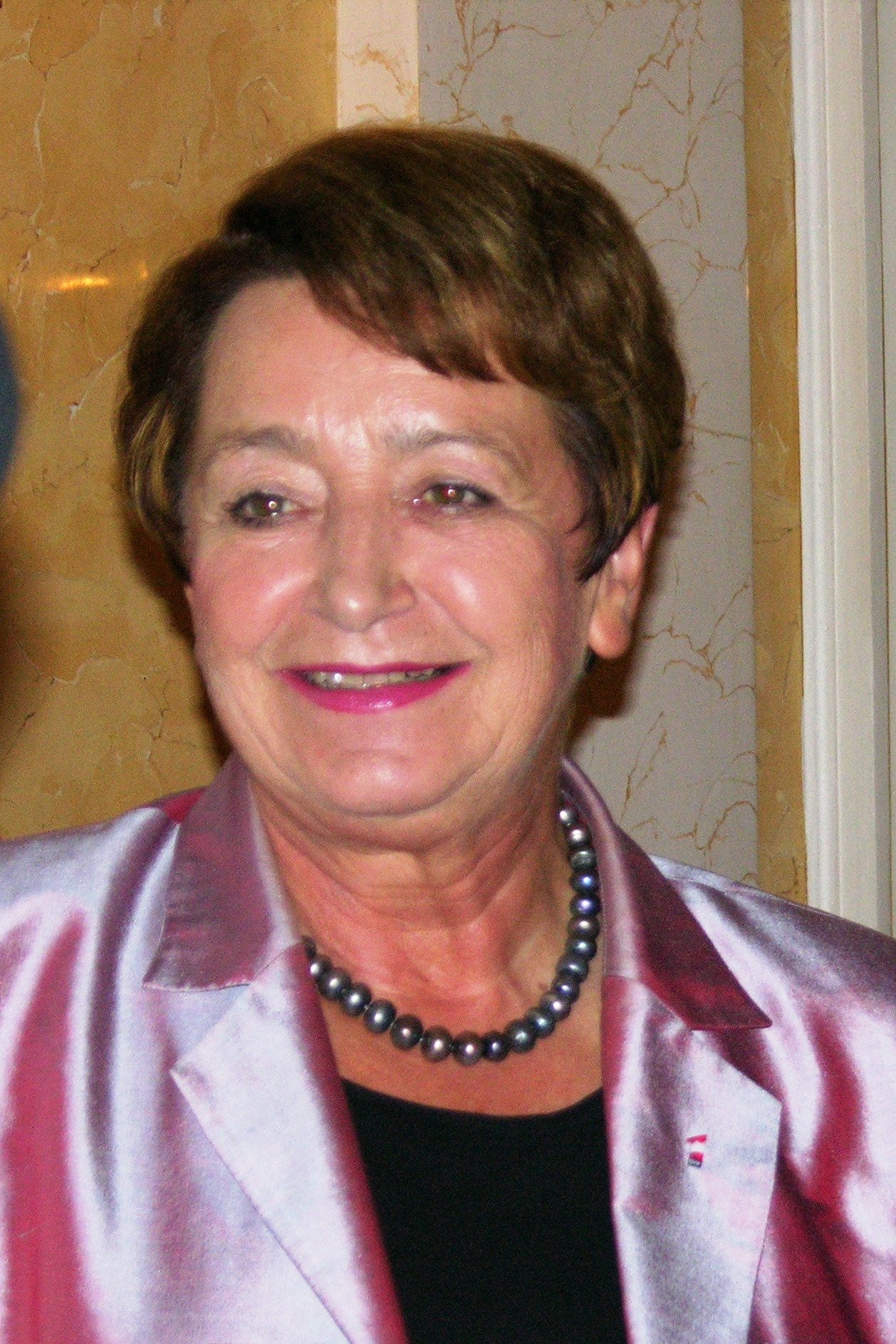
- Gehrer in 2006

Minister for Education
- In office 4 May 1995 – 11 January 2007
- Chancellor: Franz Vranitzky; Viktor Klima; Wolfgang Schüssel
- Preceded by: Erhard Busek
- Succeeded by: Claudia Schmied

Personal details
- Born: 11 May 1942 (age 83) Vienna, Nazi Germany (now Austria)
- Party: Austrian People's Party
- Children: 3

Elisabeth Gehrer (née Pokorny, born 11 May 1942) is an Austrian politician for the Austrian People's Party (ÖVP). From May 1995 until January 2007, Gehrer was Federal Minister for Education, Science and Culture, at first in grand coalition governments headed by Franz Vranitzky and Viktor Klima (both SPÖ), and from 2000 onwards in Wolfgang Schüssel's coalition government. From 1999 to 2007, she also served as vice party chairperson of the Austrian People's Party (ÖVP).

== Biography ==
The daughter of a self-employed businessman and a kindergarten teacher, she was brought up and educated in Innsbruck. She became a primary school teacher in 1961 and continued teaching in small country schools, until 1966.

In 1964, she married Fritz Gehrer, moved to Bregenz, Vorarlberg and became a homemaker. The couple has three adult sons, one of whom, Stefan, is a journalist for the ORF.

Gehrer started her political career in 1980 as a regional politician in Bregenz. She remained in Vorarlberg in various political positions until her appointment as federal minister in 1995.

Gehrer announced her decision to step down in the wake of the Austrian legislative election, 2006, and was succeeded on 11 January 2007 by Claudia Schmied and Johannes Hahn.

Gehrer was a scout leader, National Commissioner for Rangers of Pfadfinder und Pfadfinderinnen Österreichs and teamed Woodbadge trainings (i.e. 1976 in Wassergspreng).

== See also ==
- Education in Austria
