= Seyss-Inquart government =

Historical government of Austria

- 28th Cabinet of Austria

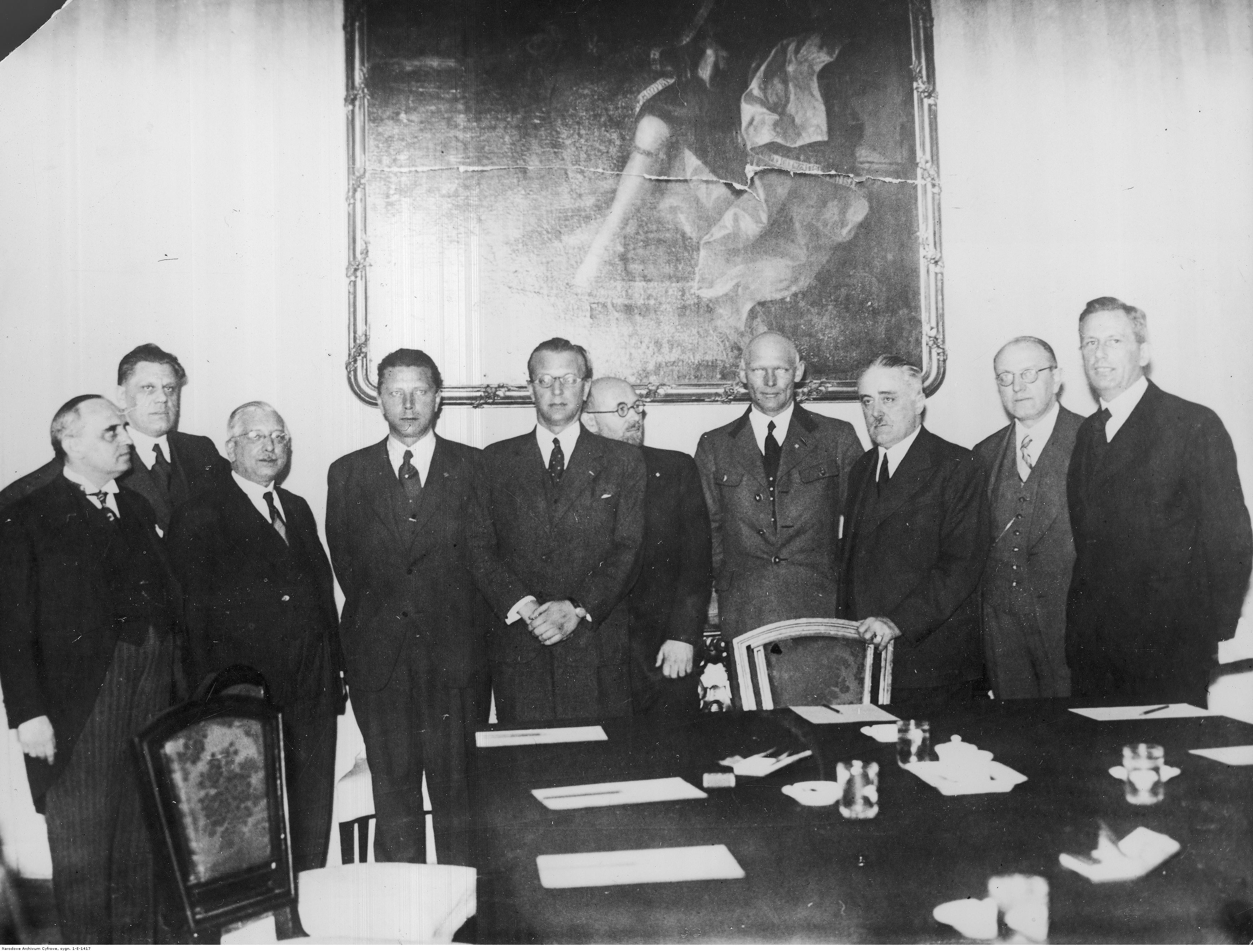
- Date formed: 11 March 1938
- Date dissolved: 13 March 1938

People and organisations
- Appointed by: Wilhelm Miklas
- Chancellor: Arthur Seyss-Inquart
- Member party: Nazi Party

History
- Election: None
- Predecessor: Schuschnigg IV
- Successor: Renner IV (1945)

The Seyss-Inquart Government (also called the Anschluss government) was the last federal government of Austria before the annexation of Austria into the German Reich, and existed only from 11 to 13 March 1938.

== Background ==
Between 23:00 and 24:00 on 11 March, President Wilhelm Miklas appointed Seyss-Inquart Chancellor. At 1:30 on 12 March, Hugo Jury announced the new government from the balcony of the Federal Chancellery.

== Composition ==
The composition of the government were as such:

Cabinet members
Portfolio	Minister	Took office	Left office
Federal Chancellery
Chancellor, Acting Minister of National Defence	Arthur Seyss-Inquart	11 March 1938	13 March 1938
State Secretary to the Chancellor of Public Security	Ernst Kaltenbrunner	11 March 1938	13 March 1938
State Secretary to the Chancellor of Formation of Political Will	Hubert Klausner	11 March 1938	13 March 1938
Vice-Chancellor	Edmund Glaise-Horstenau	11 March 1938	13 March 1938
Ministers
Minister of Justice	Franz Hueber	11 March 1938	13 March 1938
Minister of Finance	Rudolf Neumayer	11 March 1938	13 March 1938
Minister of Agriculture and Forestry	Anton Reinthaller	11 March 1938	13 March 1938
Minister of Trade and Transport	Hans Fischböck	11 March 1938	13 March 1938
Minister of Social Affairs	Hugo Jury	11 March 1938	13 March 1938
Minister of Education	Oswald Menghin	11 March 1938	13 March 1938
Minister of Foreign Affairs	Wilhelm Wolf	11 March 1938	13 March 1938
State Secretaries
State Secretary of Security Forces	Michael Skubl	11 March 1938	13 March 1938
State Secretary	Friedrich Wimmer	13 March 1938	13 March 1938
State Secretary	Maximilian de Angelis	13 March 1938	13 March 1938
