= Sonja Hammerschmid =

Austrian molecular biologist and politician (born 1968)

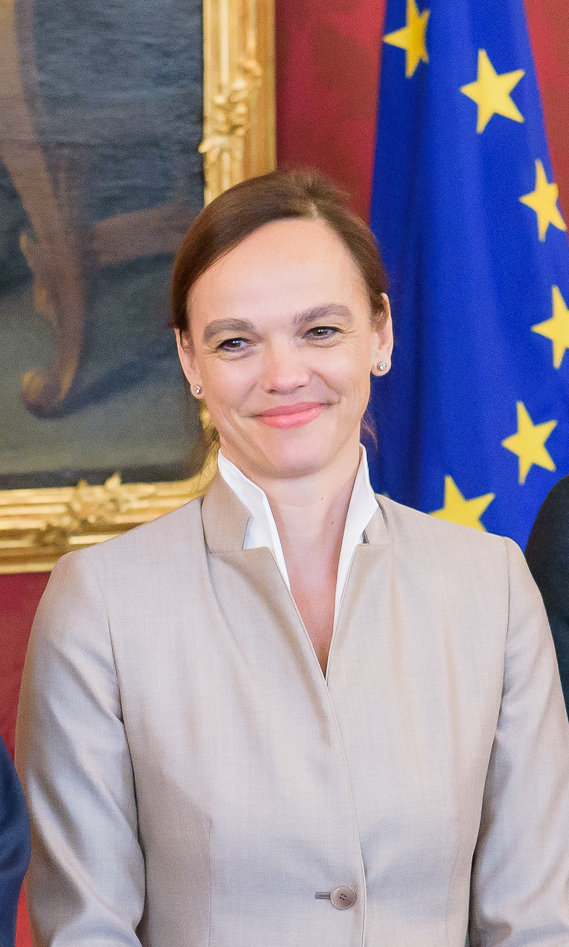

Minister of Education
- In office May 18, 2016 – December 18, 2017
- Chancellor: Christian Kern
- Preceded by: Gabriele Heinisch-Hosek
- Succeeded by: Heinz Faßmann

Personal details
- Born: June 24, 1968 (age 58) Steyr
- Party: Social Democratic Party
- Spouse: Michael Hammerschmid
- Education: University of Vienna

Sonja Hammerschmid (born Sonja Maria Theresia Mörwald on June 24, 1968 in Steyr) is an Austrian molecular biologist and politician. She was Rector of the University of Veterinary Medicine Vienna from 2010 to 2016 and minister of education in the Kern government from 2016 to 2017. Since 2017, Hammerschmid has been a member of the Austrian National Council. Hammerschmid is a member of the Social Democratic Party.

== Early life ==
Sonja Hammerschmid was born as Sonja Maria Theresia Mörwald on June 24, 1968 in Steyr.

Hammerschmid grew up in Baumgartenberg, a rural town of about 1200 people. She attended primary school from 1974 to 1978 and hauptschule from 1978 to 1982. She completed her secondary education at the gymnasium in Perg, graduating in 1986.

Hammerschmid's parents were working class. The region, bordering the Iron Curtain, was economically underprivileged; a large agricultural sector was trying to eke a living out of some of the poorest soils in the country. Hammerschmid's school career was highly respectable given her background and locale; educational mobility was low in small, disadvantaged rural towns in 1970s Austria. Hammerschmid freely admits to being a statistical outlier.

== Career ==
Starting in 1986, Hammerschmid studied genetics and tumor biology at the University of Vienna, receiving a master's degree in 1992 and a PhD in 1995. From 1990 to 1995, she was also working as a research associate at Boehringer Ingelheim.

Hammerschmid followed her dissertation with two years of postdoctoral work at the Vienna Biocenter.

In 1998, Hammerschmid abandoned her science career, frustrated with the grind of lab work and the unpredictability of the race to publication. After a few months as a product manager at Margaritella-Biotrade, she became the executive manager of the Innovation Agency (German: Innovationsagentur GmbH), a government agency for the promotion of young entrepreneurs, where she spent her time organizing competitions and subsidy programs and generally linking up innovative startups with investor advice and money. When the Innovation Agency was absorbed into the Austria Wirtschaftsservice Gesellschaft in 2003, Hammerschmid became the new institution's Head of Technology and Innovation.

Hammerschmid also served on numerous supervisory boards and committees.

In September 2010, Hammerschmid was appointed rector of the University of Veterinary Medicine Vienna, originally for a term of four years. She easily won reappointment for a second term. In December 2015, Hammerschmid was elected president of Universities Austria (Österreichische Universitätenkonferenz or Uniko), the lobbying federation of Austria's public universities. Inaugurated in January 2016, she was the first woman to lead the organization. Hammerschmid resigned from both positions upon entering politics in 2016.

== Political career ==
Hammerschmid considered going into formal politics for most of her adult life and systematically built a strong network of useful connections. Even so, she did not join any political party. Her working-class family background, which she says kept strongly influencing her ideologically, would have naturally positioned her left of center. In matters of education and science policy, however, she felt more closely aligned with the Austrian People's Party, a party philosophically conservative and sociologically middle to upper class. She is also broadly sympathetic to classical liberalism, stating in an interview that some of the platform planks of NEOS would resonate with her. Hammerschmid is not easily pigeonholed into any of the three or four traditional Austrian camps.

In 2014, the People's Party briefly considered tapping her for state secretary of scientific research.

In May 2016, Christian Kern took over as the head of the exhausted and beleaguered coalition of Social Democrats and People's Party in the middle of an election cycle. Kern immediately reshuffled his cabinet, trying to revitalize the coalition through four new appointments. Besides trying to project optimism and present fresh faces, Kern was also attempting to hint at having a certain technocratic streak. Kern's ideal candidate would not have a strong party power base, so as not to be able to prevent him from consolidating power, but would nevertheless be able to serve as a token of good faith to one of the party's for major factions. Hammerschmid fit the bill and was a good choice as Kern's message to the right wing of the party. On May 18, 2016, Hammerschmid was appointed head of the Ministry of Education and Women's Affairs. A subsequent reapportionment of ministerial responsibilities − a maneuver regularly undertaken by new parliamentary majority leaders − moved women's affairs into the purview of the Ministry of Health. On July 1, 2016, Hammerschmid received her new permanent appointment as the minister of education.

Hammerschmid joined the Social Democratic Party just in time for her official introduction to the rank and file.

Sonja Hammerschmid's term as a minister ended when the coalition of Social Democrats and People's Party broke down following the October 2017 election. Taking office on December 18, 2017, the right-of-center first Kurz government replaced Hammerschmid with Heinz Faßmann. The election had landed Hammerschmid with a seat on the National Council, however. Since November 9, 2017, Hammerschmid has been serving in the national legislature.

== Selected publications ==
- Hammerschmid, Sonja (1991). Transkriptionsmodulationssystem am Beispiel des Apolipoprotein Al Gens (MSc). University of Vienna.
- — (1995). cDNA-Klonierung und Charakterisierung des humanen Apolipoprotein B mRNA Editingenzyms (PhD). University of Vienna.
- — (2010). "Gender-Strategie – Inputs seitens einer Förderagentur". In Floimair, Roland; et al. (eds.). Chancengleichheit als Standortfaktor. Enquete des Salzburger Landtages am 8. April 2010. Präsentation des Leitbildes für Chancengleichheit von Frauen und Männern. Salzburg: Landespressebüro Land Salzburg. pp. 26–43. ISBN 978-3-85015-251-8.
- — (2013). "Kreative Kombination erzeugt Mehrwert". In Lackner; Erna (eds.). Phantasie in Kultur und Wirtschaft. Studien-Verlag. pp. 121–124. ISBN 978-3-7065-5319-3.
- — (2015). "Veterinärmedizinische Universität Wien (Vetmeduni Vienna)". In Ehalt, Hubert Christian; et al. (eds.). Wissens- und Universitätsstadt Wien. Eine Entwicklungsgeschichte seit 1945. Göttingen: V&R unipress/Vienna University Press. pp. 367−368. ISBN 978-3-8471-0399-8.
