= Erhard Busek =

Austrian politician (1941–2022)

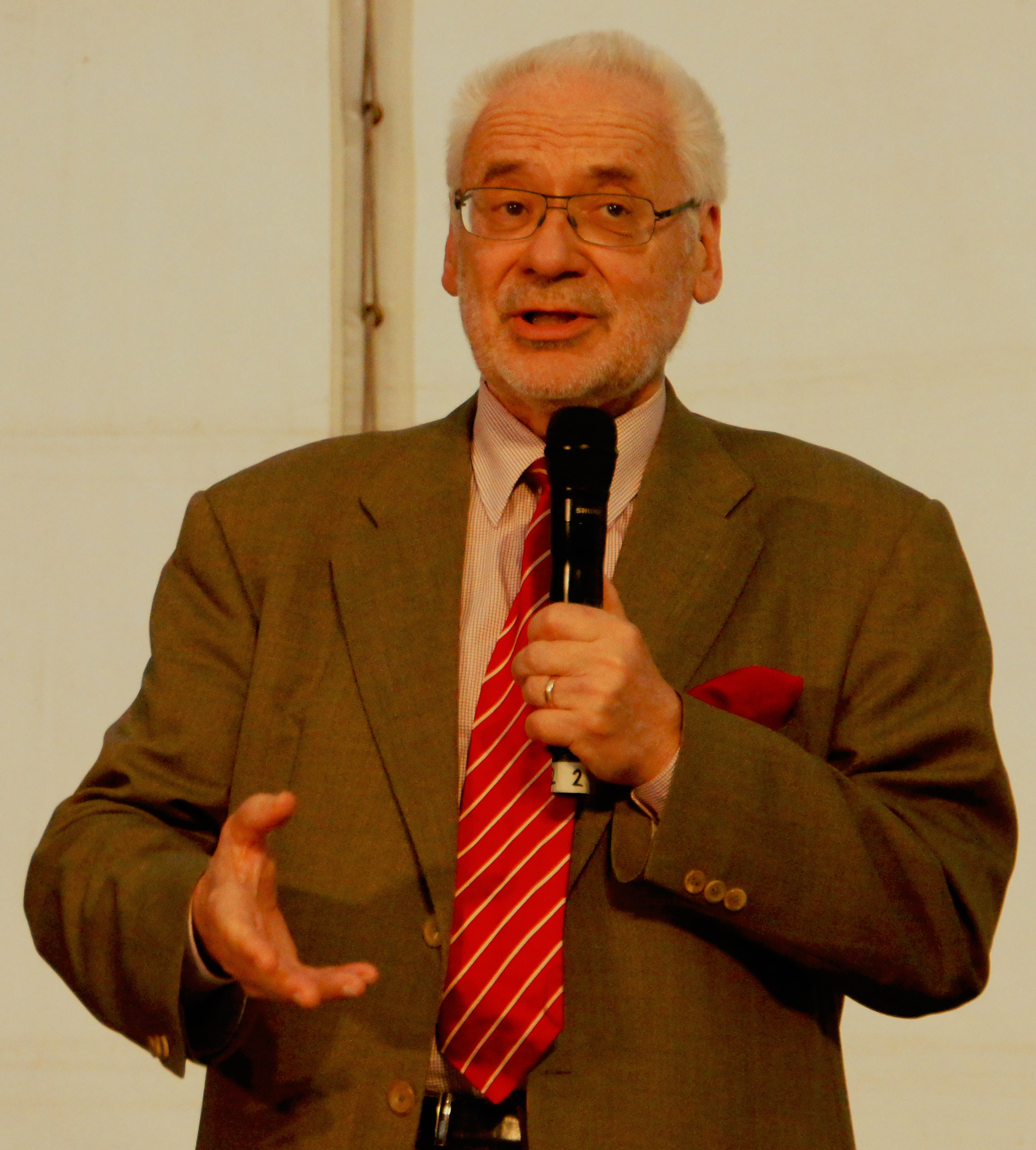
- Busek in 2013

Vice-Chancellor of Austria
- In office 2 July 1991 – 4 May 1995
- Chancellor: Franz Vranitzky
- Preceded by: Josef Riegler
- Succeeded by: Wolfgang Schüssel

Minister of Education and Cultural Affairs Education and the Arts (1994–1995)
- In office 29 November 1994 – 4 May 1995
- Chancellor: Franz Vranitzky
- Preceded by: Rudolf Scholten
- Succeeded by: Elisabeth Gehrer

Minister of Science and Research
- In office 24 April 1989 – 29 November 1994
- Chancellor: Franz Vranitzky
- Preceded by: Hans Tuppy
- Succeeded by: Rudolf Scholten

Personal details
- Born: 25 March 1941 Vienna, Austria
- Died: 13 March 2022 (aged 80)
- Party: People's Party
- Education: University of Vienna

Erhard Busek (25 March 1941 – 13 March 2022) was an Austrian politician from the Christian-conservative People's Party (ÖVP). Throughout his political career, he was widely regarded as one of the leaders of the party's liberal wing. He was coordinator of the South-Eastern Cooperative Initiative (SECI) and chairman of the Institute for the Danube Region and Central Europe.

Busek was chief of the party and Vice-Chancellor of Austria in the coalition of the Social Democratic Party of Austria with the People's Party between 1991 and 1995 and was an important reformer of the Austrian universities. From January 2002 until June 2008 Busek served as Special Co-ordinator of the Stability Pact for South Eastern Europe, the final person to hold the position.

== Early life and education ==
Busek earned his Doctor of Laws at the University of Vienna in 1963. During his studies, he also served as Chairman of the Austrian Youth Council. He was a Roman Catholic. He was a Boy Scout in his youth.

== Political career ==
Busek began his professional career in 1964 as legal adviser to the association of the parliamentarians of the Austrian People’s Party (ÖVP). He then served as Secretary General of the Austrian Federation for Trade and Commerce (1968–1975). In 1975, he was appointed Secretary-General of the Austrian People’s Party and was elected Member of Parliament later that year. Busek was succeeded as secretary-general by Sixtus Lanner in 1976. Busek gained additional experience in administration between 1968 and 1976 while with a publishing firm in the economic field. In 1976 Busek entered municipal politics. He was City Councilor and was elected Deputy-Mayor of Vienna in 1978, a position he held until 1987. He was appointed Minister for Science and Research in April 1989. From 1994 until May 1995 Busek was Minister for Education.

=== Vice-Chancellor of Austria, 1991–1995 ===
Busek was elected Chairman of the Austrian People’s Party in 1991 and served as Vice-Chancellor of Austria in the government of Chancellor Franz Vranitzky from 1991 to 1995. In this position, he argued in favor of recognizing the independence of the Yugoslav republic of Slovenia, a move that would have put Austria outside the Western consensus on the issue. The government lost its two-thirds majority in Parliament in the 1994 elections that gave increased support to Jörg Haider, a right-wing leader known for his anti-immigrant speeches. However, both Vranitzky and Busek negotiated to continue their coalition and to lead Austria into the European Union in 1995.

At the April 1995 party congress, Wolfgang Schüssel took over the ÖVP chairmanship in a coup succeeding Busek and replacing the party’s ministers in the governing coalition. Following his departure from the Austrian government, Busek was tipped as rector of the College of Europe in Bruges, the training ground for EU officials and diplomats, and as being the preferred choice of then President of the European Commission Jacques Santer for the post; the job instead went to Otto von der Gablentz.

=== Role in European politics, 2000–2009 ===
In early 2000 Busek was appointed Special Representative of the Austrian Government on EU Enlargement by Chancellor Wolfgang Schüssel. He served in that position until December 2001. From January 2002 until June 2008, Busek was the Special Co-ordinator of the Stability Pact for South Eastern Europe, succeeding Bodo Hombach in this Brussels-based position. During his time in office, he pressed for EU membership for the Western Balkan countries before Turkey’s accession to the Union.

In 2009, Busek served as an adviser to the Czech EU presidency.

== Other activities ==
Busek has delivered many lectures on domestic and foreign topics and has participated in many conferences in Austria and abroad. He received honorary doctorates from the Universities of Kraków, of Bratislava, of Brasov and Czernowitz, of Liberec and the Webster-St. Louis University Vienna. He was vice-chancellor of the University of Applied Sciences Salzburg, Visiting Professor at Duke University, NC, USA, and at the University of Agriculture in Vienna. He was also teaching at the University Innsbruck and the University of Vienna. In addition his lectures are planned to be involved in the teaching programme of the Vienna University of Technology (Technische Universität Wien) and the University of Belgrade, Serbia.

Since 2008, Busek has been advising the Economic Initiative for Kosovo on promoting foreign direct investments in Kosovo.

In addition, Busek has held paid and unpaid positions, including:

- Duke University, Visiting Professor of the Practice of Public Policy Studies
- Institute for the Danube and Central Europe (IDM), Chairman
- Europaeum, Member of the Board of Trustees
- European Council on Foreign Relations (ECFR), Member
- European Forum Alpbach, Chairman
- EU-Russia Centre (EU-RC), President
- International Center for Advanced and Comparative EU-Russia/NIS Research (ICEUR), Co-Chair (alongside Hannes Swoboda)
- Commission on Radio and Television Policy: Central and Eastern Europe, Co-Chair
- European Council on Tolerance and Reconciliation, Member
- Committee on Education in the European Union, Member
- Co-ordinator of the Southeast European Co-operative Initiative (SECI), a project created in 1996 to enhance stability in Southeastern Europe through the development of economic and environmental co-operation
- Salzburg University of Applied Sciences, Vice-Chancellor
- Vienna Economic Forum, President

Every year Busek and Oliver Vujovic, SEEMO Secretary General, award the annual Erhard Busek SEEMO Award for Better Understanding in South East Europe, in collaboration with the South East Europe Media Organisation (SEEMO) in Vienna.

== Recognition ==
Busek has received awards and decorations from Poland, Hungary, Italy, Bulgaria, Liechtenstein, Romania, the Czech Republic and Slovenia. He was Honorary Senator of the Medical University of Innsbruck and was laureate of the Corvinus-Prize of the Europa Institute Budapest.

== Biography ==
2002–2008: Special Co-Coordinator of the Stability Pact for South Eastern Europe

2000–2001: Special Representative of the Austrian Government for the Enlargement of the European Union

1996 – ? : Coordinator - Southeast European Cooperative Initiative (SECI)

1995 – ? : Chairman - Institute for the Danube Region and Central Europe (IDM)

1991–1995 Vice-Chancellor - Republic of Austria; Chairman - Austrian People’s Party

1994–1995 Minister for Education

1989–1994 Minister for Science and Research

1978–1987 Deputy Mayor and City Councillor - City of Vienna

1976–1989 Chairman - Vienna’s People’s Party

1976–1978 Member of Parliament

1975–1976 General Secretary - Austrian People’s Party

1972–1976 General Secretary - Austrian Association for Trade and Commerce

1964–1968 Secretary of the Parliament of the Austrian National Council

As of 1989 Collaboration with Transforming Economies

Before 1989 Engagement with Democratic and Dissident movements in Poland, Czechoslovakia, Yugoslavia, and Former Eastern Germany.

1959–1963 Doctor of Law, University of Vienna, Faculty of Law

1959 High School Degree, Vienna, Austria

== Books ==
- "Die unvollende Republik", Vienna (1968)
- "Demokratiekritik - Demokratiereform" (1969), together with G. Wilflinger;
- "Urbanisierung" (1970), Busek et al.
- "Qualitative Marktwirtschaft" (1975), together with Ch. Festa and I. Görner
- "Wien - ein bürgerliches Credo", Vienna (1978);
- "Die kranken Riesen – Krise des Zentralismus" Franz Deuticke Verlag (1981);
- "Mut zum aufrechten Gang", Vienna (1983)
- "Sprache und Phantasie - Ein Gespräch zwischen Wissenschaft und Politik", Editor E. Busek and M. Peterlik, Verlag für Geschichte und Politik, Vienna (1984)
- "Projekt Mitteleuropa", together with E. Brix, C. Ueberreuter (Vienna 1986);
- "Aufbruch nach Mitteleuropa" together with G. Wilflinger, Edition Atelier (Vienna 1986);
- "Wissenschaft, Ethik und Politik" together with M. Peterlik, Verlag für Geschichte und Politik (Vienna 1987);
- "Wissenschaft und Freiheit – Ideen zu Universität und Universalität" together with W. Mantl und M. Peterlik, Verlag für Geschichte und Politik (1989);
- Editor of "Brücken in die Zukunft – Weltausstellung Vienna-Budapest 1995", Edition Atelier (1989);
- "Heimat – Politik mit Sitz im Leben", Braintrust Verlag (1994);
- "Mensch im Wort" Edition Atelier (1994);
- "Mitteleuropa – Eine Spurensicherung", Verlag Kremayr & Scheriau (1997);
- "Österreich und der Balkan – Vom Umgang mit dem Pulverfaß Europas", Verlag Molden (1999);
- "Die EU-Präsidentschaft Österreichs. Eine umfassende Analyse und Dokumentation des zweiten Halbjahres 1998. Ergebnisse - Bewertungen – Schlussfolgerungen", Alexander Schallenberg und Christoph Thun-Hohenstein, Herausgeber der Schriftenreihe: Herbert Batliner und Erhard Busek, MANZ-Verlag Vienna 1999.
- Editor with Carl Baudenbacher "Europa im Zeitalter der Globalisierung – Vorträge des 1. DDr. Herbert Batliner Symposiums", Manz Verlag (2000);
- "Eine Reise ins Innere Europas - Protokoll eines Österreichers", Wieser Verlag (2001);
- Editor together with Baudenbacher "Europa und die Globalisierung – Referate des Zweiten Wiener Globalisierungs symposiums 10 and 11 May 2001" Verlag Österreich Vienna 2002;
- "Drinnen oder draußen? Die öffentliche österreichische EU-Beitrittsdebatte vor der Volksabstimmung 1994", Franz Heschl, Herausgeber der Schriftenreihe: Herbert Batliner und Erhard Busek, Böhlau-Verlag Vienna 2002.
- "Paradigmenwechsel im Völkerrecht zur Jahrtausendwende. Beiträge zu aktuellen Völkerrechtsfragen", Waldemar Hummer, Herausgeber der Schriftenreihe: Herbert Batliner und Erhard Busek, MANZ-Verlag Vienna 2002.
- "Eine europäische Erregung. Die "Sanktionen" der Vierzehn gegen Österreich im Jahr 2000", Hrsg. v. Erhard Busek und Martin Schauer, Böhlau-Verlag Vienna 2003
- Editor with Carl Baudenbacher "Europa und die Globalisierung – Referate des Dritten Wiener Globalisierungssymposiums 16 and 17 May 2002 " Verlag Österreich;
- "Offenes Tor nach Osten", Molden Verlag (2003);
- "Die Europäische Union auf dem Weg nach Osten" Erhard Busek together with Werner Mikulitsch, Wieser Verlag (2003),
- Editor with Abfalter "Kultur und Wirtschaft", Studien Verlag (2003);
- "Europa und die Globalisierung IV. Referate des Vierten Wiener Globalisierungs-Symposiums", Hrsg. v. Carl Baudenbacher und Erhard Busek, Verlag Österreich Vienna 2004.
- Editor together with Hummer "Aspekte der Globalisierung – Terrorbekämpfung, Steuerwettbewerb, Gentechnik – Referate des Fünften Globalisierungs-Symposiums 13-14 May 2004";
- "Etappen am Weg zu einer Europäischen Verfassung.", Hrsg. v. Erhard Busek und Waldemar Hummer, Böhlau-Verlag Vienna 2004.
- "Der Europäische Konvent und sein Ergebnis. Eine Europäische Verfassung", Hrsg. v. Erhard Busek und Waldemar Hummer, Böhlau-Verlag Vienna 2004.
- "Alpenquerender und inneralpiner Transitverkehr", Hrsg. v. Erhard Busek und Waldemar Hummer, LIT-Verlag Vienna 2005.
- "Tabubruch. Österreichs Entscheidung für die Europäische Union", Von Manfred Scheich, Herausgeber der Schriftenreihe: Herbert Batliner und Erhard Busek, Böhlau-Verlag Vienna 2005.
- "Aspekte der Globalisierung. Terrorbekämpfung, Steuerwettbewerb, Gentechnik. Referate des Fünften Wiener Globalisierungs-Symosiums", Hrsg. v. Carl Baudenbacher und Erhard Busek, Verlag Österreich Vienna 2005.
- "Der Kleinstaat als Akteur in den Internationalen Beziehungen", Hrsg. v. Erhard Busek und Waldemar Hummer, Verlag der Liechtensteinischen Akademischen Gesellschaft 2005
- Editor together with Baudenbacher "Aspekte der Globalisierung - Beiträge des 6. Wiener Globalisierungssymposiums : Islam – Medien – Migration – Gentechnik * Referate des Sechsten Globalisierungssymposiums 2.-3. Juni 2005 " Verlag Österreich Vienna 2006;
- "10 Years Southeast European Cooperative Initiative. From Dayton to Brussels", Hrsg. v. Erhard Busek, Springer Vienna New York 2006.
- "Die Konstitutionalisierung der Verbandsgewalt in der (neuen) Europäischen Union. Rechtliche, politische und ökonommische Konsequenzen der neuen Verfassung der EU", Hrsg. v. Erhard Busek und Waldemar Hummer, Böhlau Vienna 2006.
- "Aspekte der Globalisierung. Beiträge des 6. Wiener Globalisierungssymposiums". Hrsg. v. Carl Baudenbacher und Erhard Busek, Verlag Österreich Vienna 2006.
- "Zu wenig, zu spät – Europa braucht ein besseres Krisenmanagement", Edition Körber-Stiftung (2007)
- Editor together with Batliner "Zentraleuropäische Präsidententreffen. Mitteleuropa mit Klestil am Runden Tisch", Tobias Gamper, Böhlau Vienna 2007
- Editor together with Batliner "Der christlich-muslimische Dialog. Voraussetzungen - Erfahrungen – Probleme", Heinrich Schneider, Böhlau Vienna 2007
