= Martin Polaschek =

Austrian politician, legal scholar and legal historian (born 1965)

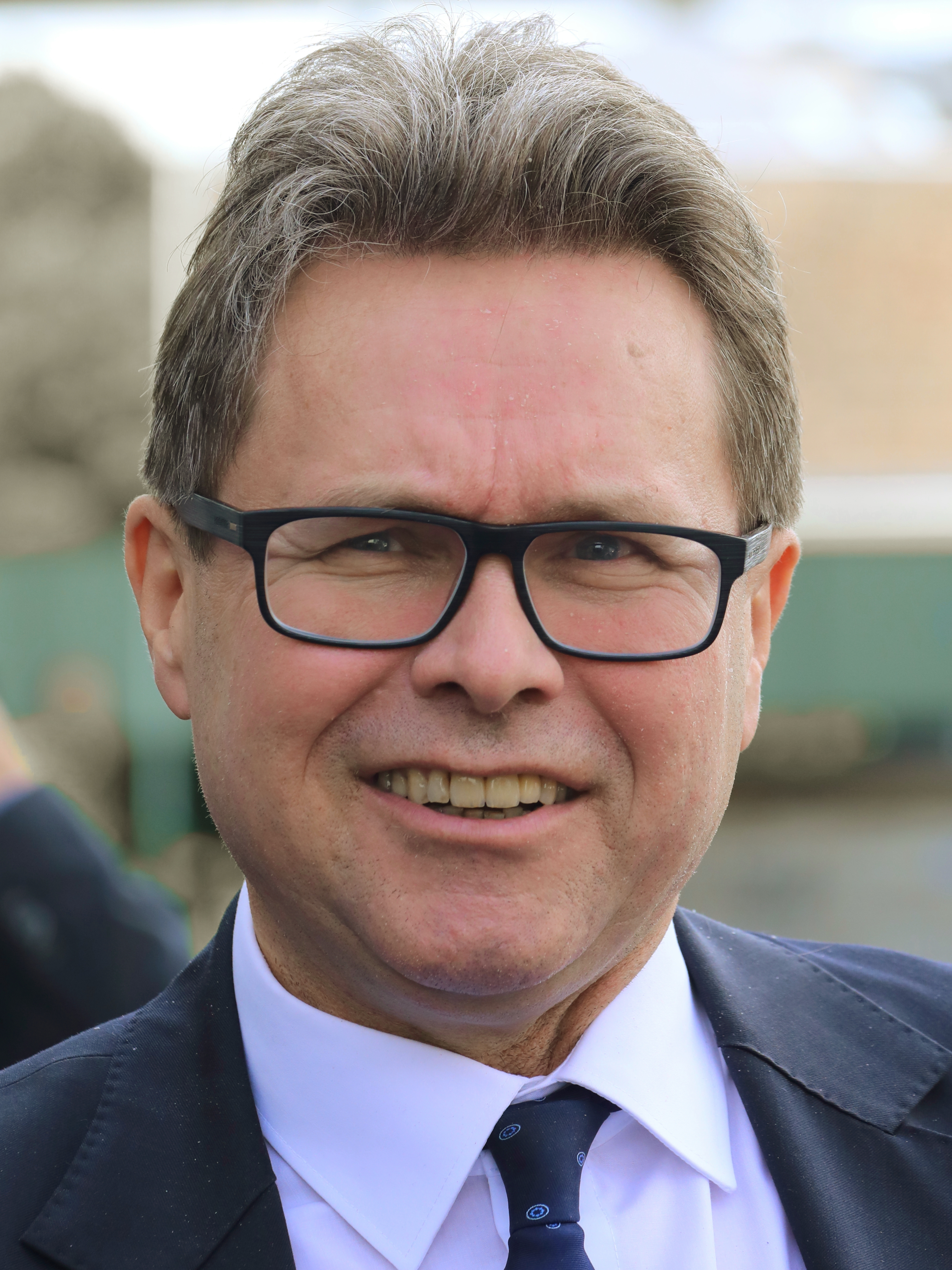
- Polaschek in 2023

Federal Minister for Education, Science and Research
- In office 6 December 2021 – 3 March 2025
- Chancellor: Karl Nehammer
- Preceded by: Heinz Faßmann
- Succeeded by: Christoph Wiederkehr

Personal details
- Born: 22 November 1965 (age 60) Bruck an der Mur, Austria
- Education: University of Graz

Martin F. Polaschek (Austrian German: [ˈmartiːn ˈpɔlaʃɛk]; born 22 November 1965) is an Austrian legal scholar and legal historian who has served as Federal Minister for Education, Science and Research in the Nehammer government since 6 December 2021. An Independent, he was nominated by the Austrian People's Party (ÖVP).

As of 2003, Polaschek was vice-rector of the University of Graz; from October 2019 to December 2021 he served as rector.

== Life ==
After graduating from high school in 1984, Martin Polaschek began studying law at the University of Graz, completing his master's degree in 1988. In 1992, he received his doctorate he attended the University of Graz for Doctor of Law, in 2000 he did habilitation and was an associate professor at the Institute for Austrian Legal History appointed and European Legal Development at the Law Faculty of the University of Graz.

In 2003 he became Director of Studies and Vice-Rector for Studies and Teaching at the University of Graz. He was a member of the expert group on the future of teacher training and is the spokesman for the Austrian Vice Rectors for Teaching. His academic focus lies in the areas of contemporary legal history as well as federalism and local government research.

He has been President of the Post-War Justice Research Center since 2006 and is an expert on denazification.

On 8 February 2019 he was appointed by University Council for rector of the University of Graz selected. He succeeded Christa Neuper in this role on 1 October 2019.

As part of the government reshuffle in December 2021, it became known that Martin Polaschek would be the non-party successor to Heinz Faßmann as Minister of Education and Science in the Nehammer government. The management of the University of Graz was initially taken over by the previous Vice Rector Peter Riedler.

== Awards ==
- 2004 Archduke Johann Research Award of the State of Styria for In the Name of the Republic of Austria! The people's courts in Styria 1945 to 1955.

== Publications ==
- 1992: The development of the law in the first republic. Legislation in constitutional and criminal law from 1918 to 1933, dbv-Verlag für die Technische Universität, dissertation 1992, ISBN 978-3-7041-9048-2
- 1997: The district representatives in Styria between 1918 and 1938. Democratic self-government or superfluous authority?, Styrian Provincial Archives, *Graz 1997
- 1998: In the name of the Republic of Austria! The People's Courts in Styria 1945 to 1955, Steiermärkisches Landesarchiv, Graz 1998, ISBN 978-3-901938-01-6
- 1999: Federalism as a Value? A study on reform possibilities of the Austrian federal state, prepared on behalf of Modell Steiermark, Aktion Vision Modell Steiermark, Graz 1999, ISBN 978-3-9501048-0-6
- 2002: The future of the municipalities in the federal state: a survey among Austria's mayors, together with Herbert Schwetz, Leykam, Graz 2002, ISBN 978-3-7011-7456-0
