= Nehammer government =

Government of Austria from 2021 to 2025

- 35th Cabinet of Austria

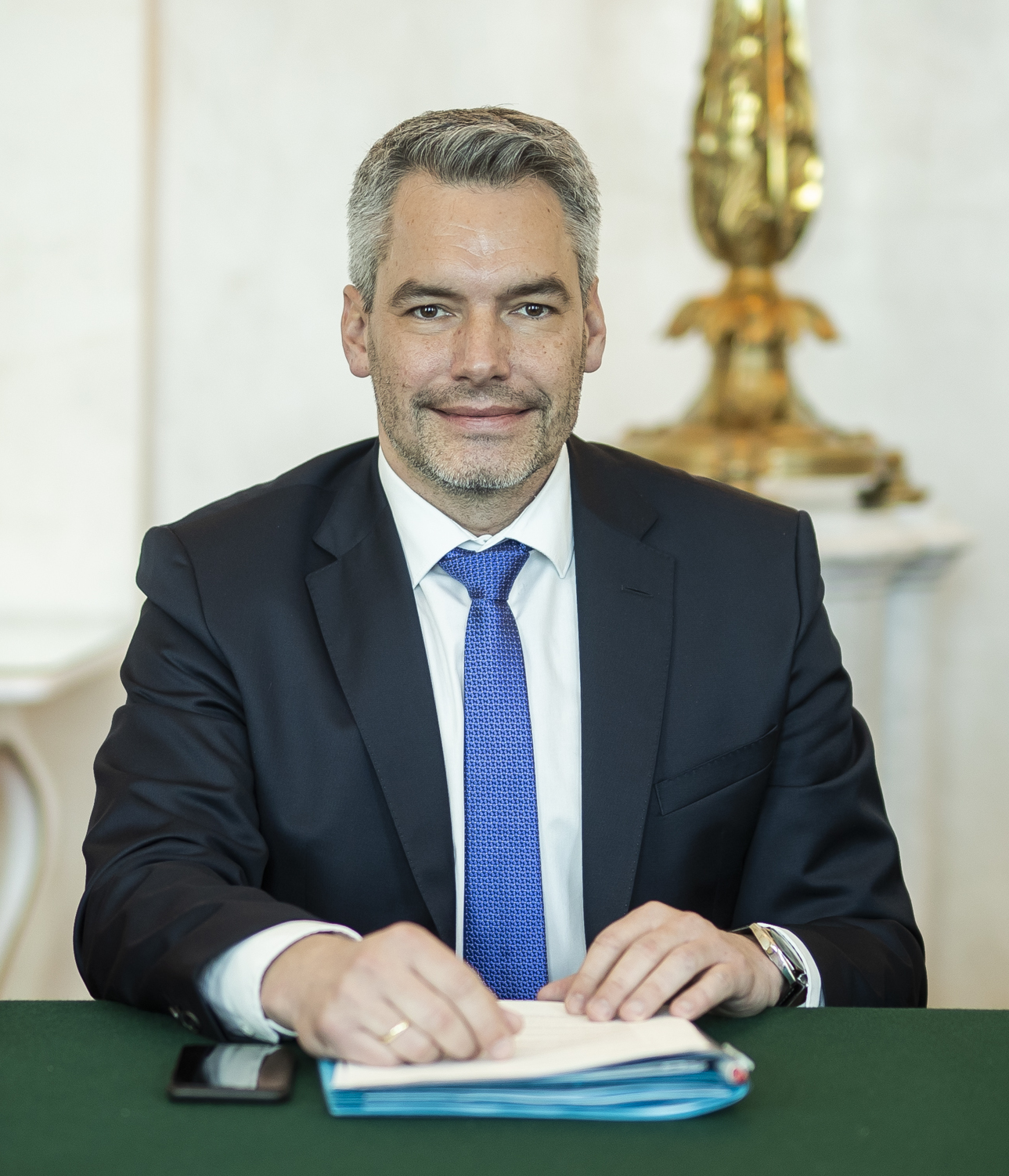
- Karl Nehammer in 2020
- Date formed: 6 December 2021
- Date dissolved: 10 January 2025

People and organisations
- President: Alexander Van der Bellen
- Chancellor: Karl Nehammer (until 10 January 2025); Alexander Schallenberg (from 10 January to 3 March 2025)
- Vice-Chancellor: Werner Kogler (until 2 October 2024)
- No. of ministers: 15 (incl. Nehammer)
- Member parties: Austrian People's Party (ÖVP); The Greens (GRÜNE)
- Status in legislature: Majority (coalition)
- Opposition parties: Social Democratic Party of Austria (SPÖ); Freedom Party of Austria (FPÖ); NEOS
- Opposition leader: Pamela Rendi-Wagner (until 3 June 2023); Andreas Babler (since 3 June 2023)

History
- Election: 2019 legislative election
- Predecessor: Schallenberg government
- Successor: Stocker government (Note: Alexander Schallenberg briefly led a caretaker government between Nehammer's resignation and Stocker's inauguration.)

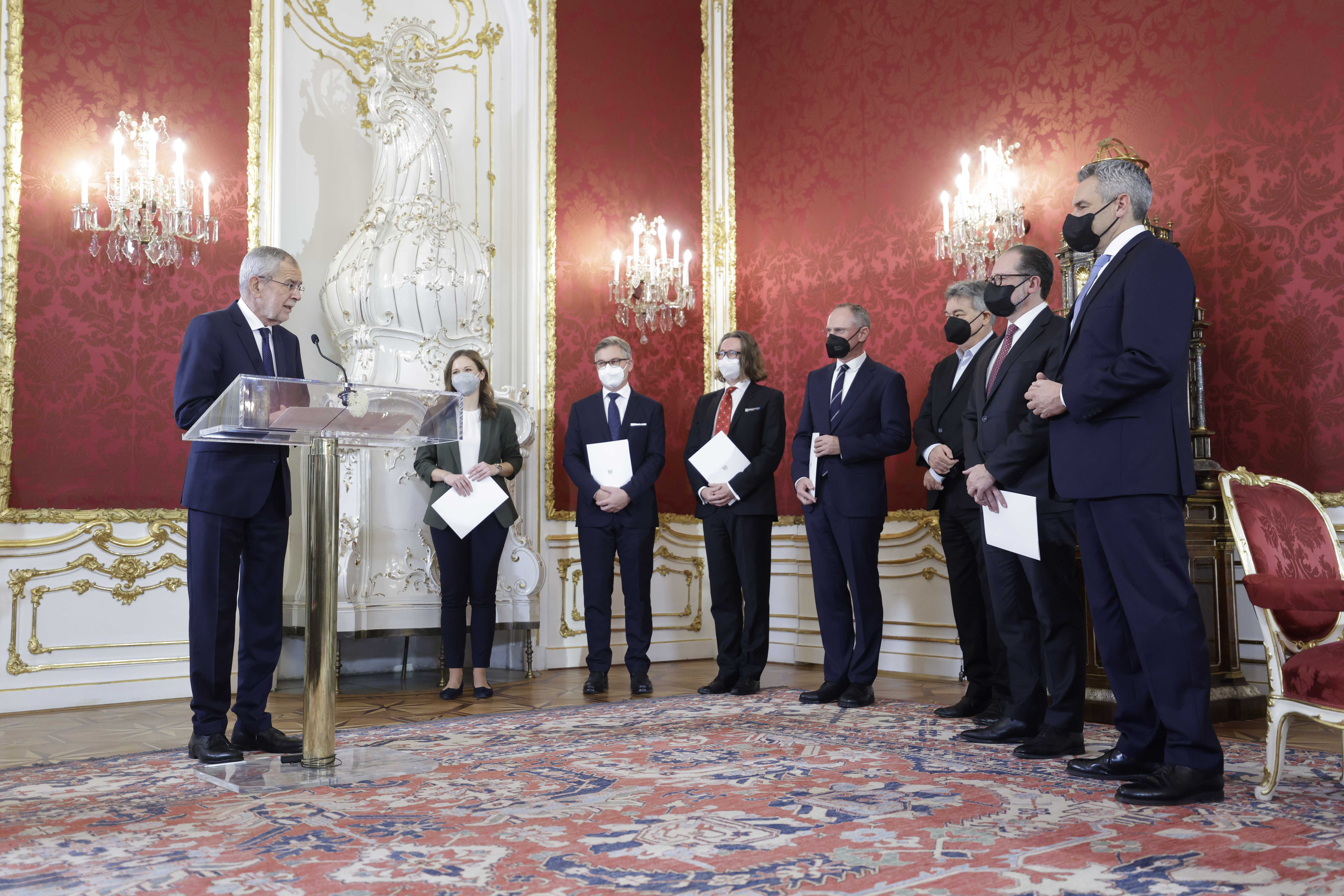
Swearing-in ceremony of the new cabinet members by Austrian President Alexander Van der Bellen on 6 December 2021

The Nehammer government (German: Bundesregierung Nehammer) was sworn in as the 35th Government of Austria on 6 December 2021. It was headed by Chancellor Karl Nehammer.

On 5 January 2025, after the end of negotiations with the SPÖ and NEOS, Nehammer resigned from his role as Chancellor of Austria and as leader of the Austrian People's Party. On the same day, the ÖVP appointed Christian Stocker as acting Party Leader, and on 10 January 2025, Alexander Schallenberg, the incumbent Foreign Minister and former Chancellor, took over the role of caretaker Chancellor until a government agreement was reached and Stocker was sworn in on 3 March.

== Composition ==
The cabinet consists of:

Portrait	Name	Office	Took office	Left office	Party	Home state
=== Chancellery ===
	Karl Nehammer	Chancellor of Austria	6 December 2021	10 January 2025	ÖVP	Vienna
	Alexander Schallenberg	Acting Chancellor of Austria	10 January 2025	3 March 2025	ÖVP	(Born abroad)
	Werner Kogler	Vice-Chancellor of Austria; Minister for Arts, Culture, the Civil Service and Sport	7 January 2020	2 October 2024 (as vice-chancellor)	Greens	Styria
=== Chancellery ministers ===
	Susanne Raab	Chancellery minister for Women and Integration	7 January 2020	3 March 2025	ÖVP	Upper Austria
	Susanne Raab	Minister for Women, Family, Integration and the Media	1 February 2021	3 March 2025	ÖVP	Upper Austria
	Karoline Edtstadler	Chancellery minister for the EU and Constitution	7 January 2020	3 March 2025	ÖVP	Salzburg
=== Ministers ===
	Magnus Brunner	Minister of Finance	6 December 2021	20 November 2024	ÖVP	Vorarlberg
	Gunter Mayr	Minister of Finance	20 November 2024	3 March 2025	Independent	
	Martin Polaschek	Minister of Education, Science and Research	6 December 2021	3 March 2025	Independent (ÖVP nominated)	Styria
	Leonore Gewessler	Minister of Climate Action, Environment, Energy, Mobility, Innovation and Technology (Note: The ministry also holds the agenda responsibilities of Infrastructure.)	7 January 2020	3 March 2025	Greens	Styria
	Martin Kocher	Minister of Labour	11 January 2021	3 March 2025	Independent (ÖVP nominated)	Salzburg
	Elisabeth Köstinger	Minister of Agriculture, Regions, and Tourism	7 January 2020	18 May 2022	ÖVP	Carinthia
	Norbert Totsching	Minister of Agriculture, Regions, and Tourism	18 May 2022	3 March 2025	ÖVP	3 March 2025
	Alexander Schallenberg	Minister for European and International Affairs	6 December 2021	3 March 2025	ÖVP	(Born abroad)
	Johannes Rauch	Minister of Social Affairs, Health, Care, and Consumer Protection	8 March 2022	3 March 2025	Greens	Vorarlberg
	Gerhard Karner	Minister of the Interior	6 December 2021	3 March 2025	ÖVP	Lower Austria
	Margarete Schramböck	Minister of Digital and Economic Affairs	7 January 2020	11 May 2022	ÖVP	Tyrol
	Klaudia Tanner	Minister of Defence	7 January 2020	3 March 2025	ÖVP	Lower Austria
	Alma Zadić	Minister of Justice	7 January 2020	3 March 2025	Greens	(Born abroad)
=== State secretaries ===
	Claudia Plakolm	State secretary in the Chancellery for Youth and Generations	6 December 2021	3 March 2025	ÖVP	Upper Austria
	Andrea Mayer	State secretary in the Ministry for Arts, Culture, the Civil Service and Sport	20 May 2020	October 2, 2024	Independent (Greens nominated)	Lower Austria

== See also ==
- Politics of Austria
