= Iris Rauskala =

Austrian economist, civil servant and politician (born 1978)

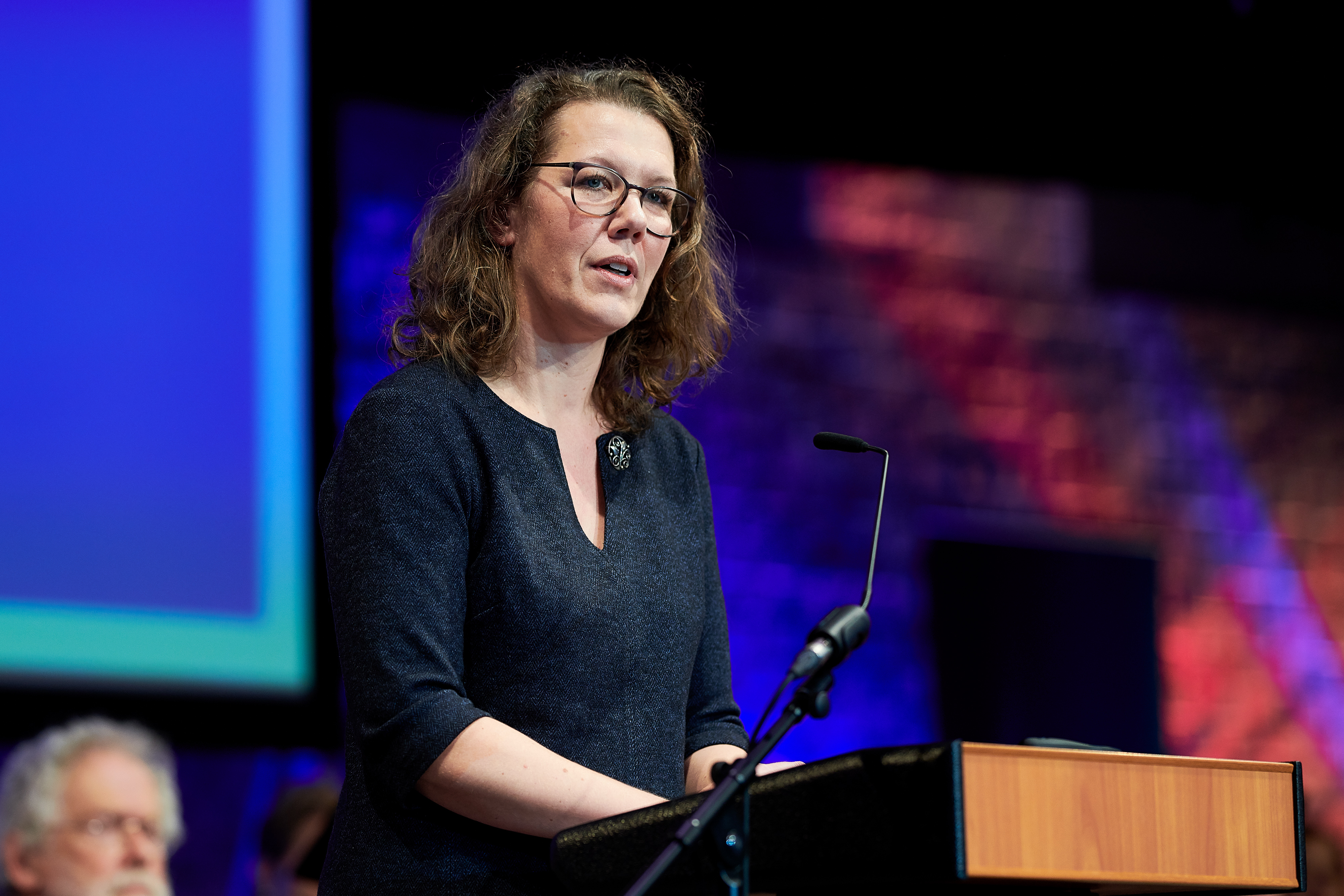
- Rauskala speaking in Vienna, 2019

Minister of Education
- In office 3 June 2019 – 7 January 2020
- Affiliation: Independent
- Preceded by: Heinz Faßmann
- Succeeded by: Heinz Faßmann

Personal details
- Born: Iris Eliisa Rauskala; 14 March 1978 (age 48) Helsinki, Finland
- Education: University of Innsbruck (Dr.)

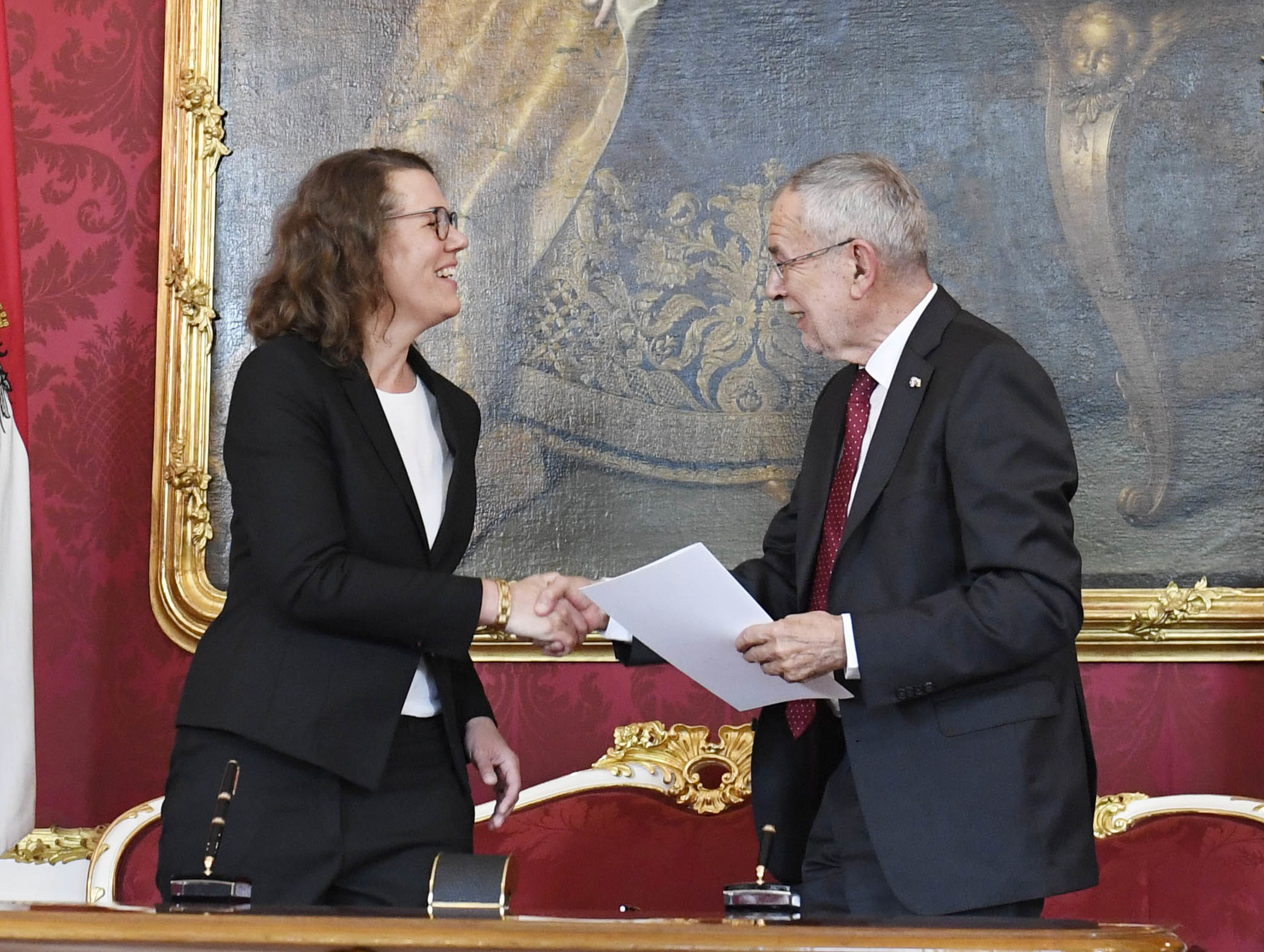
Inauguration of Iris Eliisa Rauskala with president Alexander Van der Bellen (2019)

Iris Eliisa Rauskala (born 14 March 1978 in Helsinki) is a Finnish-born Austrian civil servant and economist who served as Minister of Education, Science and Research in the Bierlein government.

== Life and career ==
The daughter of a Finnish scientist father and an Austrian civil servant mother, Rauskala was born in Helsinki, where she lived until the age of five.

She studied international economics at the University of Innsbruck and completed a doctorate in 2006. Rauskala then joined the civil service in the Ministry of Economy and later the science ministry, working under ministers Johannes Hahn, Beatrix Karl and Karlheinz Töchterle. She taught at the Zurich University of Applied Sciences from 2011 until she was appointed to a highly ranked position in the education ministry in 2015. She is deputy chairperson of the Austrian Science Fund board of supervisors.

On 3 June 2019 she was sworn in as Minister for Education, Science and Research in the interim government of Brigitte Bierlein. She was described as popular and "extremely dynamic".

In 2018, she married a woman and published that fact in an interview briefly after her inauguration. According to her, there were never any negative reactions.
