= First Dollfuss government =

First Austrian cabinet under Engelbert Dollfuss

- 22nd government of Austria

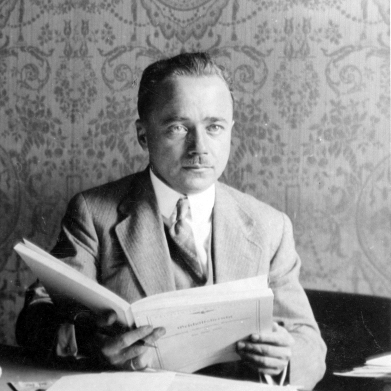
- Dollfuss c. 1930
- Date formed: 20 May 1932
- Date dissolved: 21 September 1933

People and organisations
- President: Wilhelm Miklas
- Chancellor: Engelbert Dollfuss
- Vice chancellor: Franz Winkler
- No. of ministers: 12
- Total no. of members: 16
- Member parties: Christian Social Party; Landbund; Heimatblock
- Status in legislature: Majority coalition government

History
- Predecessor: Buresch II
- Successor: Dollfuss II

The First Dollfuss government (German: Bundesregierung Dollfuß (I)) was sworn in on 20 May 1932 and was replaced on 21 September 1933.

== Composition ==
Portfolio	Minister	Took office	Left office	Party	Ref
Federal Chancellery
Federal Chancellor & Acting minister for Agriculture and Forestry	Engelbert Dollfuss	20 May 1932	21 September 1933	CS	
Vice chancellor entrusted with the technical management of economic policy matters	Franz Winkler	20 May 1932	10 May 1933	Landbund	
Minister entrusted with the technical management of internal administration matters	Franz Bachinger	20 May 1932	10 May 1933	Landbund	
Minister entrusted with the technical management of internal administration and economic policy matters	Vinzenz Schumy	10 May 1933	21 September 1933	Landbund	
Minister entrusted with the technical management of public security affairs	Hermann Ach	20 May 1932	28 September 1932	Independent	
Minister entrusted with the technical management of public security affairs	Emil Fey	28 September 1932	21 September 1933	Landbund	
Minister entrusted with the technical management of constitutional and administrative reform matters	Otto Ender	19 July 1933	21 September 1933	CS	
Ministers
Minister of Justice	Kurt Schuschnigg	20 May 1932	21 September 1933	CS	
Minister for Education	Anton Rintelen	20 May 1932	24 May 1933	CS	
Minister for Education	Kurt Schuschnigg (act.)	24 May 1933	21 September 1933	CS	
Minister of Social Affairs	Josef Resch	20 May 1932	11 March 1933	CS	
Minister of Social Affairs	Robert Kerber	11 March 1933	21 September 1933	Independent	
Minister of Finance	Emanuel Weidenhoffer	20 May 1932	10 May 1933	CS	
Minister of Finance	Karl Buresch	10 May 1933	21 September 1933	CS	
Minister of Commerce and Transport	Guido Jakoncig	20 May 1932	10 May 1933	Heimatblock	
Minister of Commerce and Transport	Fritz Stockinger	10 May 1933	21 September 1933	CS	
Minister for the Army	Carl Vaugoin	20 May 1932	21 September 1933	CS	
