= Heinz Faßmann =

Austrian politician and professor (born 1955)

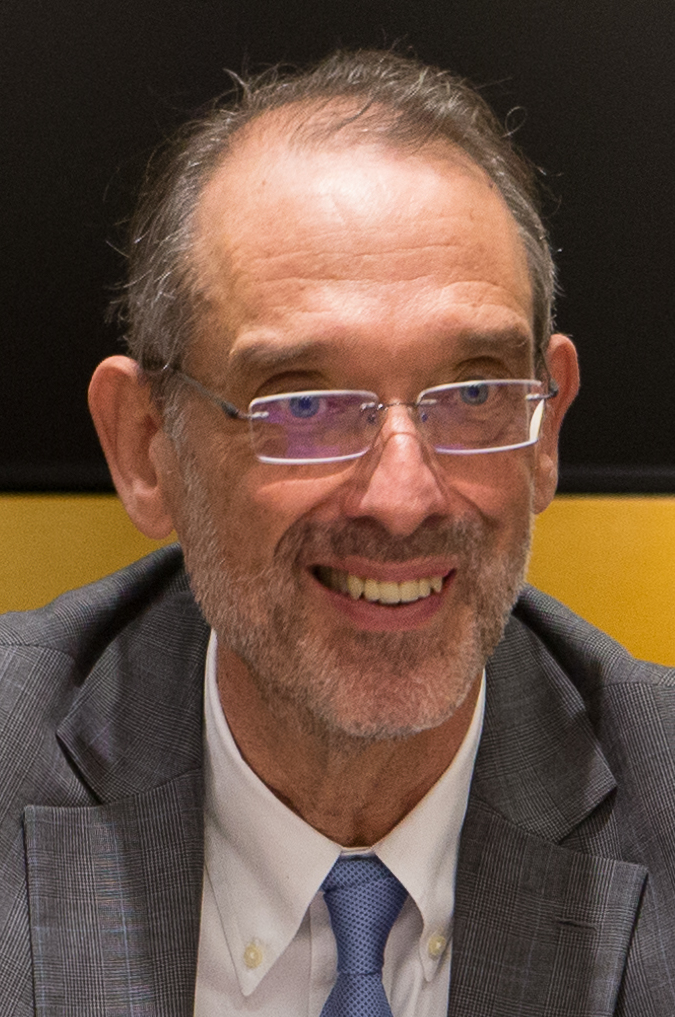
- Fassmann in 2018

Minister of Education
- In office 7 January 2020 – 6 December 2021
- President: Alexander Van der Bellen
- Chancellor: Sebastian Kurz; Alexander Schallenberg
- Preceded by: Iris Rauskala
- Succeeded by: Martin Polaschek
- In office 18 December 2017 – 3 June 2019
- President: Alexander Van der Bellen
- Chancellor: Sebastian Kurz
- Preceded by: Sonja Hammerschmid
- Succeeded by: Iris Rauskala

Personal details
- Born: 13 August 1955 (age 71) Düsseldorf, Germany
- Party: Independent
- Height: 2.03 m (6 ft 8 in)
- Children: 2
- Education: University of Vienna (PhD)
- Website: Parliament website

Heinz Faßmann (born 13 August 1955 in Düsseldorf) is an Austrian politician and professor of human geography and land-use planning at the University of Vienna. He served as the Minister of Education in the Second Kurz cabinet in the government of Chancellor Sebastian Kurz and the Schallenberg government of Chancellor Alexander Schallenberg. He previously served in the same capacity from December 2017 to June 2019: he was succeeded in the post by Martin Polaschek in December 2021. Faßmann is considered to be aligned with the Austrian People's Party (ÖVP) but holds no formal party membership or affiliation.

In 2022, he became the new president of the Austrian Academy of Sciences.

== Early life and education ==
Heinz Faßmann was born on 13 August 1955 in Düsseldorf, Germany. He spent his childhood and adolescence in Vienna. Faßmann attended primary school from 1962 to 1966 and grammar school from 1966 to 1974.

Faßmann studied geography and social and economic history at the University of Vienna, graduating with a PhD in 1980. From 1980 to 1981, he was engaged in postgraduate work in sociology at the Institute for Advanced Studies.

== Career ==
From 1981 to 1992, Faßmann was a researcher with the Austrian Academy of Sciences. He spent his academy years on the academy's commission on land-use planning (Kommission für Raumforschung). On the strength of his commission work, he was appointed director of the Institute of City and Regional Planning (Institut für Stadt- und Regionalforschung) in 1992.

Four years later, in 1996, Faßmann left Vienna and the academy to become a C4 professor of human geography and geoinformatics at the Technical University of Munich. Another four years later, in 2000, Faßmann returned to Vienna to teach human geography and land-use planning at his alma mater. In 2011, he was made the university's vice rector, a post he held until his transition into politics in 2017. He also served as a member of the senate of the University of Vienna from 2000 to 2006 and as the dean of the Faculty of Geosciences from 2006 to 2011.

In addition to his academic work, Faßmann held positions on various committees and sat on the supervisory boards of a number of companies, including one university spin-off incubator. Faßmann ran a spin-off of his own, the Heinz Faßmann Projektentwicklung KG, from 2013 to 2018. He was director of the Expert Commission of German Foundations on Integration and Migration (Sachverständigenrat deutscher Stiftungen für Integration und Migration) from 2009 to 2017. In 2006 he was, for the second time, appointed Director of the Institute of City and Regional Planning.

Faßmann routinely acted as a political consultant and advisor to the Austrian government. He became chairman of the Ministry of Europe, Integration and Foreign Affairs Expert Commission on Integration (Expertenrat für Integration) in 2010. He has been sitting on the Ministry of the Interior Migration Council for Austria (Migrationsrat für Österreich), later renamed Migration Commission (Migrationskommission), since 2014.

=== Minister of Education, 2018–2021 ===
Although Faßmann had never held elected office and never officially attached himself to any political party, he was invited to join the Kurz cabinet as the minister of education. When the cabinet took office on 18 December 2017, Faßmann was appointed minister of education and science. Following a reshuffling of ministerial responsibilities − a move regularly made by new parliamentary majority leaders − he became minister of education, science and research on 8 January 2018. While in government Faßmann resigned his positions as a vice rector, as the chairman of the commission, and as a member of the council. For the duration of his term in cabinet office, he also suspended his position as the director of the Institute of City and Regional Planning.

Faßmann was succeeded by another ÖVP-nominated academic, Martin Polaschek, in the Nehammer Government in December 2021.

=== President of the Austrian Academy of Sciences, 2022–present ===
In 2022, Faßmann became the new president of the Austrian Academy of Sciences.

Since 2023, Faßmann has been a member of an expert group entrusted to support the interim evaluation of the European Union's Horizon Europe programme, chaired by Manuel Heitor.

== Other activities ==
- National Fund of the Republic of Austria for Victims of National Socialism, Member of the Board of Trustees (since 2020)

== Personal life ==
Born a German, Faßmann has been a naturalized Austrian citizen since 1994. He is married and has two children.

Faßmann stands well over two meters tall. Correcting media reports that erroneously cited even greater numbers, Faßmann states his height at 203 cm.

== Selected publications ==
- Faßmann, Heinz; Aufhauser, Elisabeth; Münz, Rainer (1988). Kindergärten in Österreich. Angebot - Nachfrage - Defizite. Vienna: Bundesministerium für Umwelt, Jugend und Familie.
- With Lichtenberger, Elisabeth (1995). Märkte in Bewegung. Metropolen und Regionen in Ostmitteleuropa. Böhlau Verlag. ISBN 3-205-98212-6.
- With Münz, Rainer, eds. (1996). Migration in Europa. Campus Verlag. ISBN 3-593-35609-0.
- With Meusburger, Peter (1997). Arbeitsmarktgeographie. Erwerbstätigkeit und Arbeitslosigkeit im räumlichen Kontext. Stuttgart: Teubner-Verlag. ISBN 3-519-03437-9.
- With Matuschek, Helga; Menasse, Elisabeth, eds. (1999). Abgrenzen, ausgrenzen, aufnehmen. Empirische Befunde zu Fremdenfeindlichkeit und Integration. Klagenfurt: Drava. ISBN 3-85435-316-2.
- With Münz, Rainer, eds. (2000). Ost-West-Wanderung in Europa. Böhlau. ISBN 3-205-98725-X.
- With Dachs, Herbert, eds. (2002). Politische Bildung. Grundlagen - Zugänge - Materialien. Vienna: öbv & hpt. ISBN 3-209-03795-7.
- With Kohlbacher, Josef; Reeger, Ursula, eds. (2002). Zuwanderung und Segregation. Europäische Methoden im Vergleich. Klagenfurt: Drava.
- With Hatz, Gerhard; Patrouch, Josef F, eds. (2007). Understanding Vienna. Pathways to the City. Vienna: Lit-Verlag. ISBN 978-3-8258-0093-2.
- With Hatz, Gerhard; Matznetter, Walter, eds. (2009). Wien - Städtebauliche Strukturen und gesellschaftliche Entwicklungen. Vienna: Böhlau-Verlag. ISBN 978-3-205-78323-7.
- With Reeger, Ursula; Sievers, Wiebke, eds. (2009). Statistic and Reality. Concepts and Measurements of Migrations in Europe. Amsterdam: Amsterdam University Press. ISBN 978-90-8964-052-9.
- Faßmann, Heinz (2009). Stadtgeographie I. Allgemeine Stadtgeographie (= Das Geographische Seminar). Braunschweig: Westermann-Verlag. ISBN 978-3-14-160364-4.
- With Müller-Funk, Wolfgang; Uhl, Heidemarie, eds. (2009). Kulturen der Differenz. Transformationsprozesse in Zentraleuropa nach 1989. Transdiziplinäre Perspektiven. Vienna: Vienna University Press. ISBN 978-3-89971-714-3.
- With Haller, Max; Lane, David (2009). Migration and Mobility in Europe. Trends, Patterns and Control. UK: Edward Elgar. ISBN 978-1-84844-371-6.
- With Pichler, Herbert; Reiner, Christian; Dobler, Karin; Matzka, Christian; Wurm, Heidrun (2009). Kompass 7/8. Geographie und Wirtschaftskunde für die 11. und 12. Schulstufe. Vienna: öbv-Verlag. ISBN 978-3-209-05943-7.
- With Dahlvik, Julia, eds. (2011). Migrations- und Integrationsforschung - multidisziplinäre Perspektiven. Ein Reader (= Migrations- und Integrationsforschung Band 1). Vienna University Press bei V&R unipress. ISBN 978-3-89971-942-0.
- With Dahlvik, Julia; Sievers, Wiebke, eds. (2012). Migrations- und Integrationsforschung - wissenschaftliche Perspektiven aus Österreich. Ein Reader (= Migrations- und Integrationsforschung Band 2). Vienna University Press bei V&R unipress. ISBN 978-3-89971-920-8.
- With Bommes, Michael; Sievers, Wiebke (2014). Migration from the Middle East and North Africa to Europe: Past Developments, Current Status and Future Potentials. Amsterdam University. ISBN 978-90-8964-650-7.
