= Richard Schmitz =

Austrian politician (1885–1954)

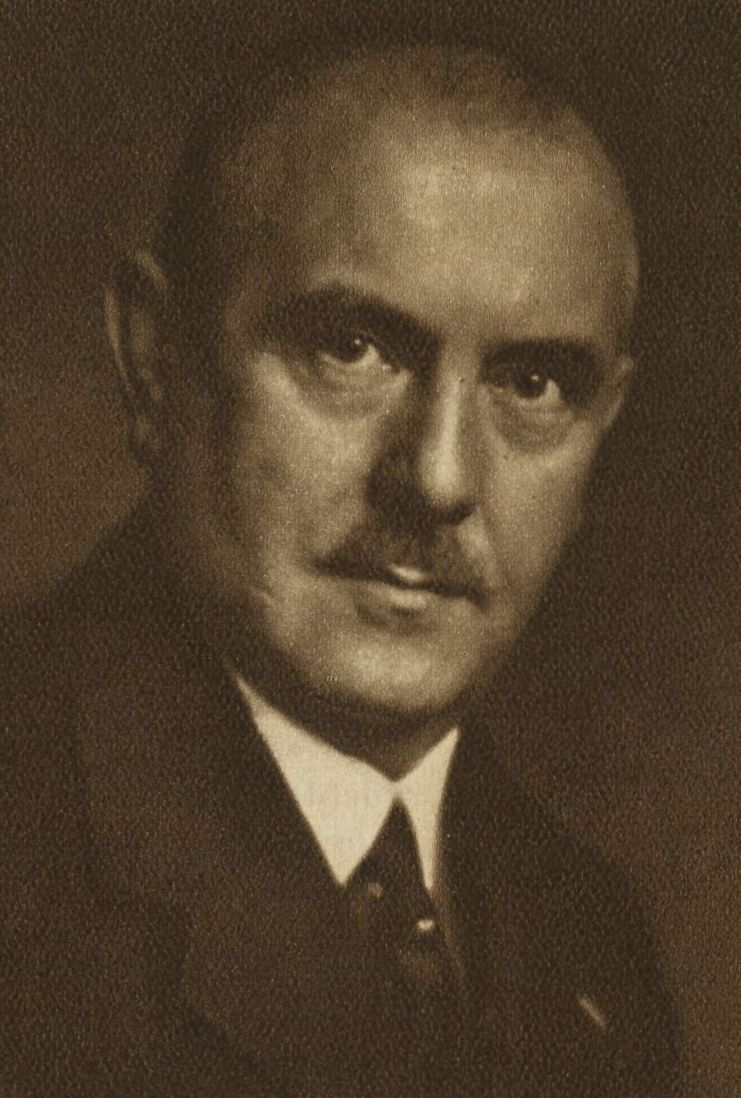
- Schmitz in 1934

Vice-Chancellor of Austria
- In office 30 September 1930 – 4 December 1930
- Chancellor: Carl Vaugoin
- Preceded by: Carl Vaugoin
- Succeeded by: Johannes Schober

Personal details
- Born: 14 December 1885; Müglitz, Moravia, Austria-Hungary
- Died: 27 April 1954 (aged 68); Vienna, Austria
- Political party: Christian Social Party

Richard Schmitz (14 December 1885 – 27 April 1954) was an Austrian politician who served as the eleventh Vice Chancellor of Austria from 30 September to 4 December 1930.

As a member of the Christian Social Party, Schmitz also served as Minister of Social Affairs as well as Federal Commissioner of Vienna. On 6 April 1934, Chancellor Engelbert Dollfuss appointed Schmitz Mayor of Vienna.

He succeeded elected Mayor Karl Seitz. Ardently anti-Nazi, Schmitz was Mayor four years later when Austria was absorbed into the Third Reich in the Anschluss. Until that point, Schmitz spoke out publicly against Nazism and its tactics.

Along with thousands of other prominent Austrians, Richard Schmitz was arrested and taken to Dachau concentration camp in Bavaria where he remained for the length of the war. In late April 1945 Schmitz was, together with other prominent concentration camp inmates, transferred to Tyrol where the SS left the prisoners behind. He was liberated by American troops on 5 May 1945.

Political offices
Preceded by Karl Seitz	Mayor of Vienna; 1934–1938	Succeeded by Hermann Neubacher
