= Ministry of Education (Austria) =

Government ministry of Austria

Federal Ministry of Education, Science and Research
- Bundesministerium für Bildung, Wissenschaft und Forschung; Unterrichtsministerium; Bildungsministerium
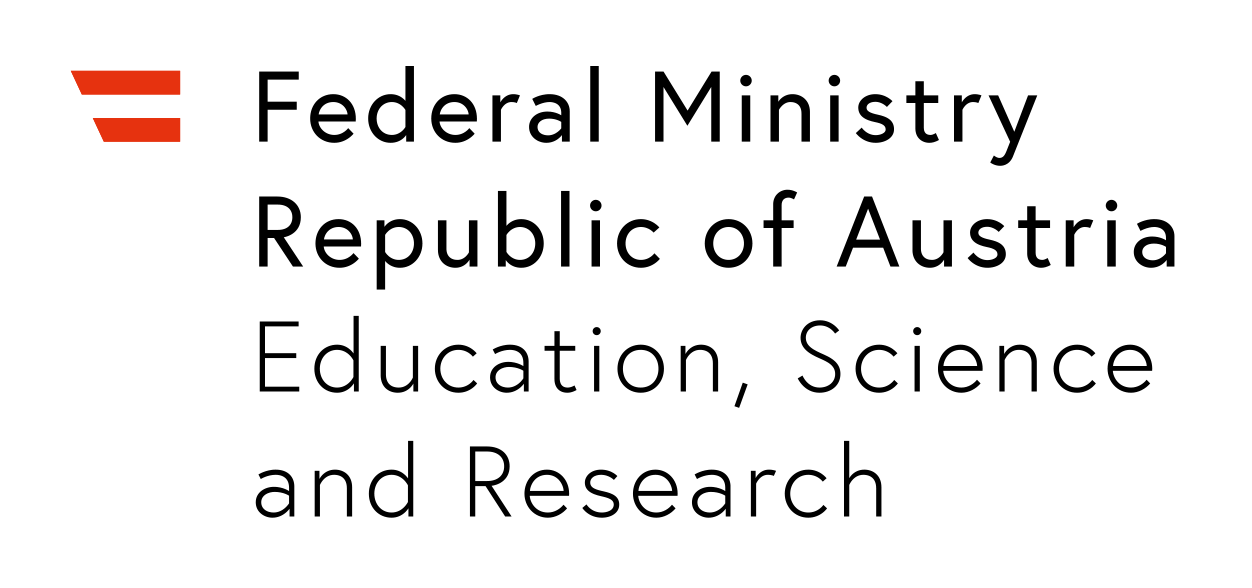

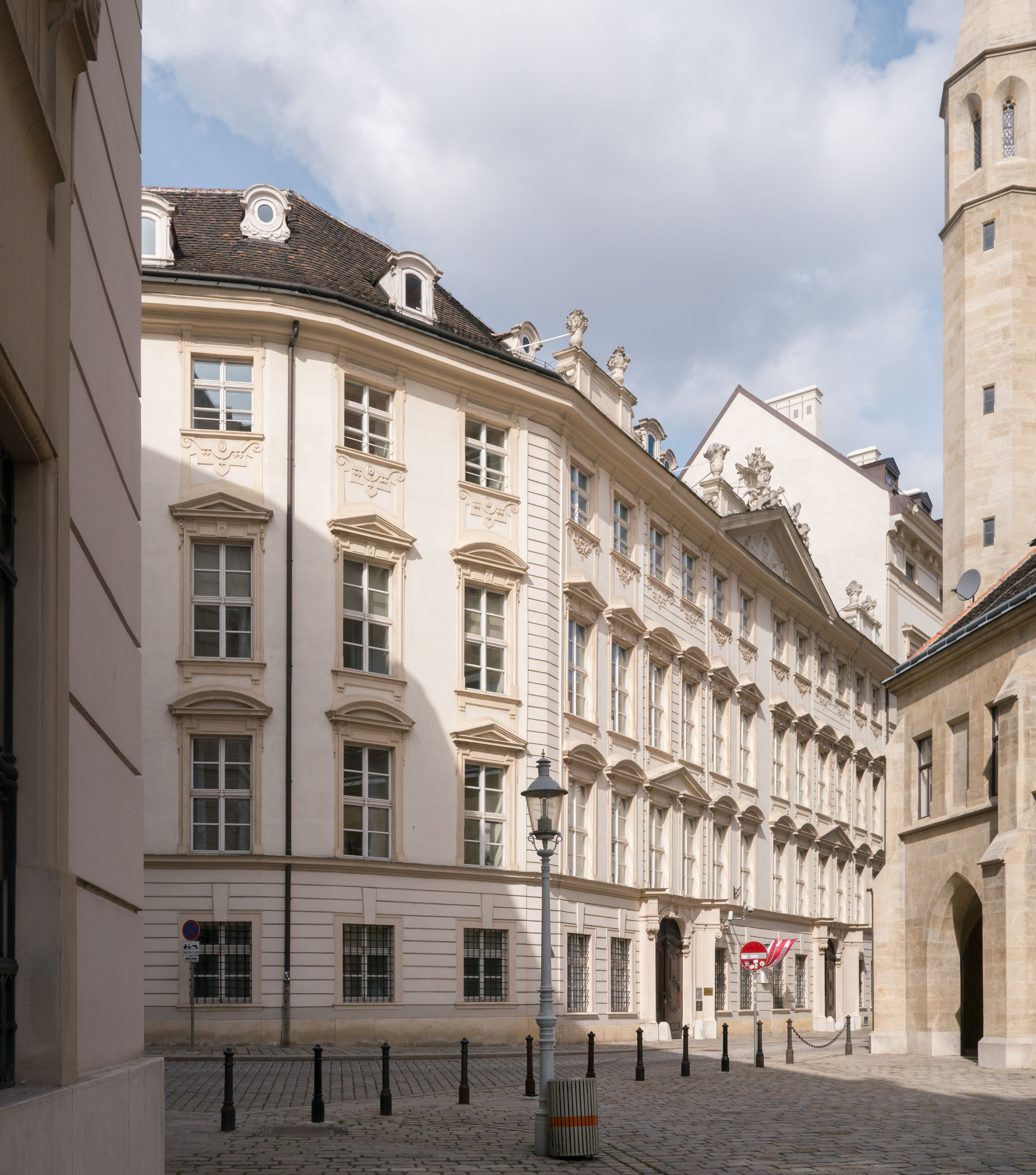

Ministry overview
- Formed: 1848
- Jurisdiction: Austria
- Headquarters: Palais Dietrichstein-Ulfeld; Minoritenplatz 3 Vienna; 48°12′33.3″N 16°21′47.2″E
- Minister responsible: Christoph Wiederkehr
- Website: Official website

The Ministry of Education (German: Bundesministerium für Bildung, Bildungsministerium, historically also Unterrichtsministerium) is the government ministry of Austria in charge of public schools and academic institutions.

The current head of the Ministry is Christoph Wiederkehr.

== Responsibilities ==
The Ministry is responsible for all matters regarding public education, including general education, vocational preparatory schools, Adult education, educational research and the Pedagogical Universities.

== History ==
The Ministry was first founded in 1848 in the wake of the Bourgeois revolution. Back then, it was named "Ministry for Cultus and Education" and included religious affairs. In the first years of the First Austrian Republic it was merged into the "Ministry for Interior and Education", until it became its own authority again in 1923. Chancellor Bruno Kreisky restructured it in 1971, creating the Ministry of Science and Research on one hand and the "Ministry of Education and Arts" on the other. From 2000 to 2007, they were merged again and formed a "Ministry of Education, Science and Culture".

In 2007, the Science Ministry was again established as its own authority. This left the remaining parts as "Ministry for Education, Arts and Culture" (German: Bundesministerium für Unterricht, Kunst und Kultur, short: BMUKK or Unterrichtsministerium). It then had additional responsibilities in the fields of Religious foundations and the arts, such as theatre and Film promotion, Museums and related management and funding, such as for the Austrian National Library, and the Vienna Philharmonic. The Bundesdenkmalamt was a sub department of the BMUKK as well.
