= Alwine =

Alwine may refer to:

- 1169 Alwine, asteroid
- Alwine (Uebigau-Wahrenbrück), settlement near Leipzig, Germany
- Alwine Dollfuß (1897–1973), wife of former Austrian chancellor Engelbert Dollfuss
- Alwine Schroedter (1820–1892), German painter
