= Alwine Dollfuß =

Wife of former Austrian chancellor Engelbert Dollfuss (1897-1973)

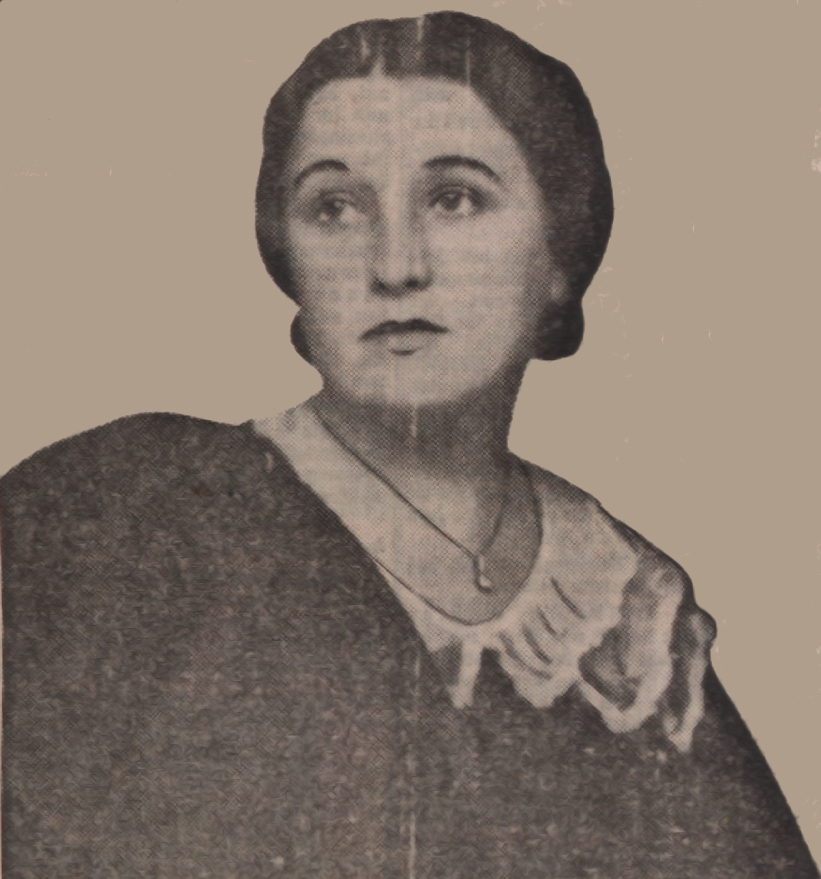
- Alwine Dollfuss ca. 1934
- Born: 12 February 1897; Prussian Province of Pomerania
- Died: 25 February 1973 (aged 76); Vienna, Austria
- Resting place: Hietzinger Cemetery
- Spouse: Engelbert Dollfuss (m. 1921; died 1934)
- Children: 3

Alwine Dollfuss (Alternatively Dollfuß; née Glienke; 12 February 1897 – 25 February 1973) was the wife of former Austrian chancellor Engelbert Dollfuss. At the time of his murder, she was in Italy with Benito Mussolini, who allowed her the use of his private plane to hurry back to Austria. She is buried in Hietzinger Cemetery next to her husband, and two of her children; Hannerl and Eva. She was also satirized in Brecht's The Resistible Rise of Arturo Ui in 1941 as the character 'Betty Dullfeet'.

From 1946 to 1957, Dollfuß lived in Truro, Nova Scotia in Canada together with her two children.

== Biography ==
=== From farmers' daughter to Chancellor's wife ===
Alwine Glienke was born in 1897 in the former Prussian Province of Pomerania (now the Pomeranian Voivodeship in Poland), into modest circumstances as one of fourteen children. At the age of 15, she left her parental home and took up employment as a cashier in Danzig (present-day Gdańsk). Dissatisfied with this position, she soon moved to Berlin, where she first worked for an older sister, and later secured employment at the Preußische Zentralgenossenschaftskasse, a precursor to today’s DZ Bank. It was there, in 1921, that she met Engelbert Dollfuss.

Dollfuss, who had served as Secretary of the Austrian Farmers' League (Österreichischer Bauernbund) since 1919, had been sent to Berlin by the League to complete the studies he had been forced to interrupt due to the First World War. In March 1921, he began working at the Zentralgenossenschaftskasse. During the summer of that same year, the couple became engaged and moved to Austria. Their wedding took place on 31 December 1921 in Dollfuss’s hometown of Kirnberg an der Mank, after which the couple relocated to Vienna.

Alwine, who came from a Protestant family, converted to her husband’s Roman Catholic faith prior to their marriage. Engelbert Dollfuss ascended steadily in his career, becoming Director of the Lower Austrian Chamber of Agriculture by 1927, while also becoming increasingly involved in political affairs. In 1930, he was appointed President of the Austrian Federal Railways (Bundesbahnen Österreich). Alwine Dollfuss accompanied her husband to political events, but did not yet assume a public role herself. Between 1927 and 1930, the couple had three children.

In March 1931, Engelbert Dollfuss was appointed to the Ender federal government as a political outsider, as he had never held a seat in the National Council, where he took office as Minister of Agriculture. He would go on to serve in the two short-lived cabinets under Chancellor Karl Buresch. Following their collapse, President Wilhelm Miklas entrusted Dollfuss with the formation of a new government in May 1932.

Given the volatile political situation, Alwine Dollfuss reacted without enthusiasm to her husband’s sudden rise to the Chancellorship. Moreover, she was now expected to contribute to the Chancellor’s public image. She did so primarily through charitable activities. Working alongside Hildegard Burjan and through Burjan’s charitable organization Soziale Hilfe ("Social Aid"), she was involved in organizing the Elisabethtisch, a charitable initiative aimed at assisting the struggling middle class during the winter months.

After Burjan’s death in July 1933, Alwine Dollfuss assumed many of her responsibilities within Soziale Hilfe, including chairing the construction committee for the Seipel-Dollfuß Memorial Church. She also lent her honorary patronage to campaigns such as Take Starving Children to Lunch and Christmas for the Homeland, both of which aimed to provide aid to impoverished children.

Following Engelbert Dollfuss’ establishment of the Fatherland Front (Vaterländische Front) as a monopolistic political organization, Alwine became involved in its women’s movement, as did other wives of political figures. In contemporary media, by that time subject to censorship since March 1933 Alwine Dollfuss was portrayed as a woman characterized by simplicity, frugality, and strong ties to the traditional values of the homeland.

=== Widow of Engelbert Dolfuss ===
Over the course of 1933 and 1934, Engelbert Dollfuss had either banned all relevant political parties or integrated them into the Fatherland Front, rendered both Parliament and the Constitutional Court incapable of action, and ultimately, through the May Constitution, established the new, authoritarian, and overtly Catholic form of government of the now corporatist state. On 25 July 1934, he was assassinated during the July Putsch by insurrectionist Nazis. At that time, Alwine Dollfuss was staying with her children at Benito Mussolini’s summer residence in Riccione, at his invitation; she returned to Vienna the following day. From then on, the government under the new Chancellor Kurt Schuschnigg began to promote a veritable cult surrounding Engelbert Dollfuss, who was described with attributes such as "immortalized", the "martyr chancellor", the "hero chancellor", or similar designations. Engelbert Dollfuss was to serve as a unifying figure for the fragile state, even beyond his death. Beginning in 1936, every event organized by the Fatherland Front concluded with the singing of the Dollfußlied, following the national anthem. The song began with the verses, “Ihr Jungen, schließt die Reihen gut / ein Toter führt uns an!” (“Young men, close your ranks well / a dead man leads us on!”). Even at Engelbert Dollfusss funeral, Cardinal Theodor Innitzer invoked the deceased with the words, “O, be our intercessor at God’s throne”, and within Catholic circles, a call was circulated: “Dollfuss is among the saints to whom we may pray!” In view of this glorification of her late husband, Alwine Dollfuss had to remain a prominent public figure. She was the guest of honor at cornerstone-laying ceremonies and unveilings of monuments dedicated to the deceased, at commemorative events marking the anniversary of his death—which was observed as a “day of national mourning”and at other similar occasions. Already on the day of her return, she had voiced support for the later reinterment of her husband in what was henceforth known as the Seipel-Dollfuß Memorial Church (on whose building committee she served). The reinterment took place with a pompous ceremony on 29 September 1934.

Alwine Dollfuss also continued her involvement in charitable work. Although some of her initiatives (like “Take starving children to lunch”) had passed to the new chancellor’s wife, Herma Schuschnigg, Dollfuss remained active in the women’s division of the Fatherland Front, served as honorary president of the Soziale Hilfe (Social Aid Association), and organized the Elisabethtisch, most recently in the winter of 1937/38 as a “luncheon for impoverished intellectuals”. The financial security of the Dollfuss family was ensured: in August 1934, the government enacted a special law granting Alwine, instead of a standard widow’s pension, the full salary of her late husband for life. In 1936, “friends and admirers of the chancellor” acquired a country estate in the municipality of Stössing for the family. Immediately prior to the Anschluss, the government dispatched Alwine Dollfuss to Benito Mussolini in a final, unsuccessful attempt to secure his support for Austrian independence.

As with the corporatist state in general, Alwine Dollfuss became a target of Nazi propaganda. The most enduring effect stemmed from an anecdote first published on 1 May 1934 in the Völkischer Beobachter. It was alleged that Alwine Dollfuss had, in a radio address, offered an out-of-touch piece of advice to impoverished families, claiming that one could make soup from sausage casings and potato peels. Despite resolute denials, the rumour of this so-called “sausage casing soup recipe” quickly and persistently spread. It was received without critical reflection and without awareness of its propagandistic origin long after 1945 and even into the 21st century.

=== Flight and return to Austria ===
With the Anschluss of Austria, the cult surrounding Engelbert Dolfuss came to an abrupt end, and Alwine Dollfuss and her children were among the first to leave the country. On 11 March, the family attempted to flee to Czechoslovakia using forged passports. Together with Richard Coudenhove-Kalergi and his wife, Ida Roland, the family then escaped via Hungary to Italy, from where Benito Mussolini arranged for them to be escorted to Switzerland. There, the family was taken in by their friend Jean-Marie Musy. Mussolini and Musy advocated for an export permit for the family's possessions and for the continued disbursement of Alwine’s widow’s pension abroad. The initial response from Nazi Germany was positive, likely due to diplomatic considerations. However, it is not known whether these efforts were ultimately successful. In addition, Alwine Dollfuss grew increasingly distrustful of Musy, as he sympathized with the Nazis and appeared to regard his support for the Dollfuss family as a means of maintaining contacts with high-ranking representatives of the Nazi Germany. Consequently, the family relocated again as early as the summer of 1938, this time to the United Kingdom, and ultimately, in July 1940, to Montreal, where they spent the following years.

The Dollfuss family's stay in Canada became known in Austria only after the end of the war. In 1950, Alwine paid a private visit to the country, and beginning in 1951, according to other sources in 1955 or 1957, she once again took up permanent residence in Austria. There, she received her pension retroactively dating back to 1945, still in accordance with the generous special provision established in 1934. It was not until 1961 that the corresponding law was repealed, and her pension adjusted to the standard level. Following the return of her daughter Eva, she lived a reclusive life with her in Vienna, where Alwine Dollfuss died in 1973. The family grave is located in the Hietzing Cemetery, to which the Nazis had returned the remains of Engelbert Dollfuss from “his” memorial church.

=== Children ===
- Hanna (7 July 1927; † 1928 due to meningitis)
- Eva (2 September 1928; † 31 January 1993), married name Nicoladoni-Dollfuß. She pursued her studies in Canada and returned permanently to Austria in 1957, where she married Ernst Nicoladoni. The couple had several daughters, among them the historian Claudia Tancsits, who today strives to foster a more positive public perception of her grandfather. Eva Dollfuss remained politically affiliated with the Austrian People's Party (ÖVP), particularly with the ÖVP Kameradschaft der politisch Verfolgten und Bekenner für Österreich (ÖVP Association of the Politically Persecuted and Confessors for Austria). Toward the end of her life, she worked for the Austrian Foreign Trade Office. In her final years, she authored a biography of her father, which was published posthumously under the publisher-chosen title Mein Vater, Hitlers erstes Opfer (My Father, Hitler’s First Victim).
- Rudolf (2 December 1930). He remained in Canada after completing his studies, where he pursued a medical career under the name Rudy Dollfuss. Most recently, he served as a pulmonologist at the Shaughnessy Hospital in Vancouver. Upon the hospital's abrupt closure in 1994, he entered retirement.
