= Gerhard Karner =

Austrian politician (born 1967)

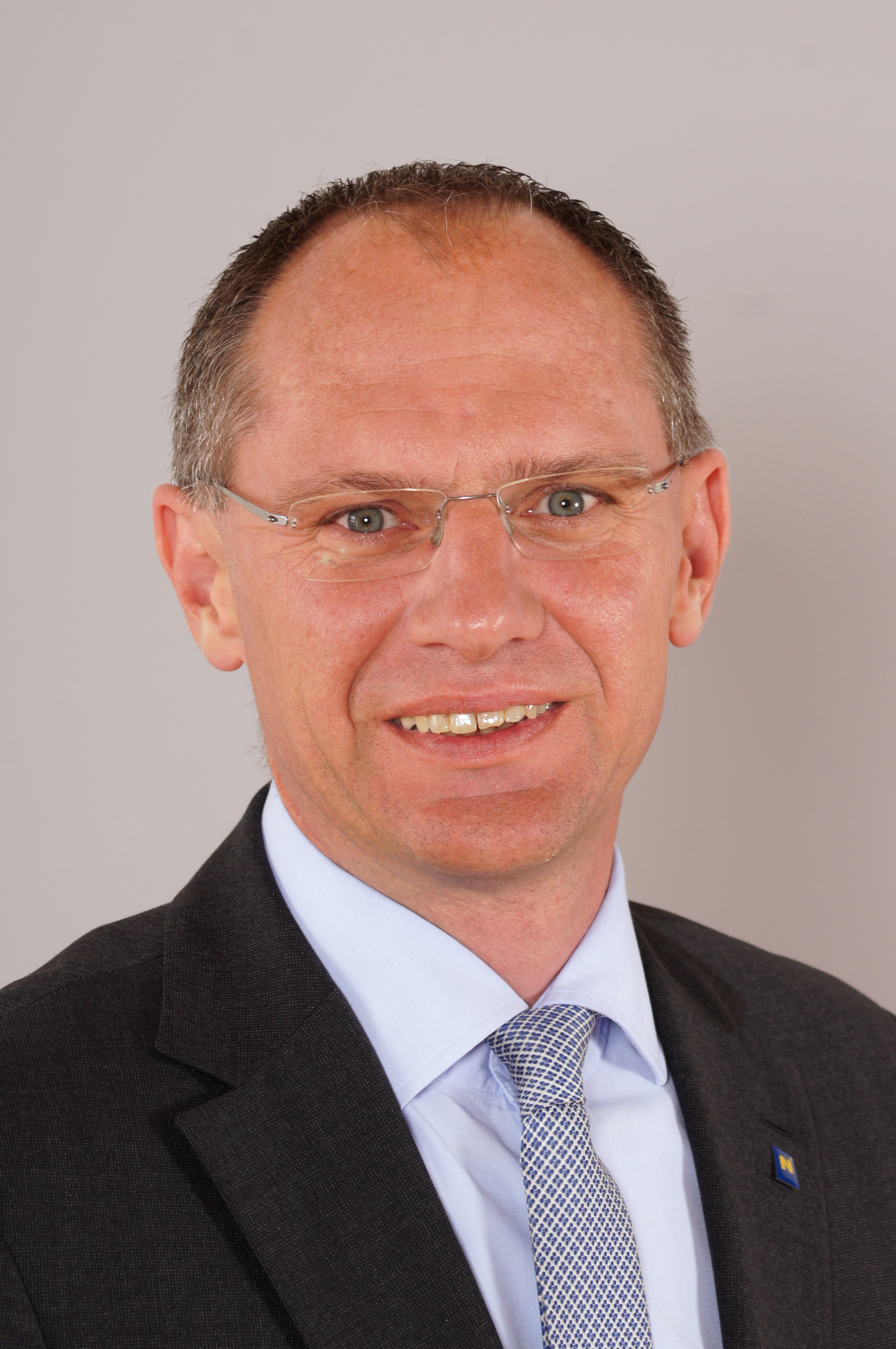
- Official portrait, 2013

Minister of the Interior
- Incumbent
- Assumed office 6 December 2021
- Chancellor: Karl Nehammer; Christian Stocker
- Preceded by: Karl Nehammer

Member of the Landtag of Lower Austria
- Incumbent
- Assumed office 30 March 2003

Personal details
- Born: 13 November 1967 (age 59) Melk, Lower Austria
- Party: People's
- Children: 3
- Education: Vienna University of Economics and Business
- Cabinet: Nehammer

Gerhard Karner (born 13 November 1967) is an Austrian politician currently serving as minister of the interior. From 2003, Karner was a member of the Lower Austrian state legislature. From 2003 to 2015, he was managing director of the People's Party of Lower Austria (VPNÖ). Following the 2015 mayoral election, he became mayor of Texingtal and retained this position until 2021.

== Life ==
Gerhard Karner spent his childhood and youth in St. Gotthard (municipality of Texingtal) and graduated from Melk Abbey High School, later studying business administration at the Vienna University of Economics and Business. He then worked in the private sector as a press officer for the Lower Austrian People's Party (ÖVP). He later served as press spokesman for Interior Minister Ernst Strasser, and as a regional manager of the ÖVP Lower Austria.

== Politics ==
Karner was politically active as a local councilor in Texingtal from 1995, and from 24 April 2003 also as an ÖVP member in the Lower Austrian state parliament. Karner was security spokesman for the ÖVP state parliament club. On 22 October 2015, he became second president of the state parliament. In the same year he was also mayor of Texingtal. On 3 December 2021, he was nominated as Minister of the Interior in the designated federal government of Nehammer and sworn in by the Federal President on 6 December 2021. Upon being sworn in as Minister, he laid diwn all communal and national political offices.

His state parliament mandate went to Marlene Zeidler-Beck, as second state parliament president Karl Moser should succeed him.

On 8 December 2022 he was one of the architects of blocking Romania's and Bulgaria's access to the Schengen area.

Following the outbreak of the Israel–Hamas war in October 2023, Karner adopted a strict stance toward anti-Israel demonstrations in Austria. He supported the prohibition of several protests and advocated the full use of legal measures against individuals accused of spreading antisemitic rhetoric or calling for the destruction of Israel.

In June 2026, during a meeting of the European Union's Justice and Home Affairs Council, Karner supported reviewing the EU's migration framework regarding the Temporary Protection Directive, an EU emergency mechanism granting immediate collective protection to displaced persons. He voiced Austria's support for ending the automatic temporary protection status for newly arriving Ukrainian men of military age beginning in March 2027, arguing that Ukraine requires this demographic to support its domestic economy and sustain its national defense amidst the ongoing Ukrainian conscription crisis.

== Criticism ==
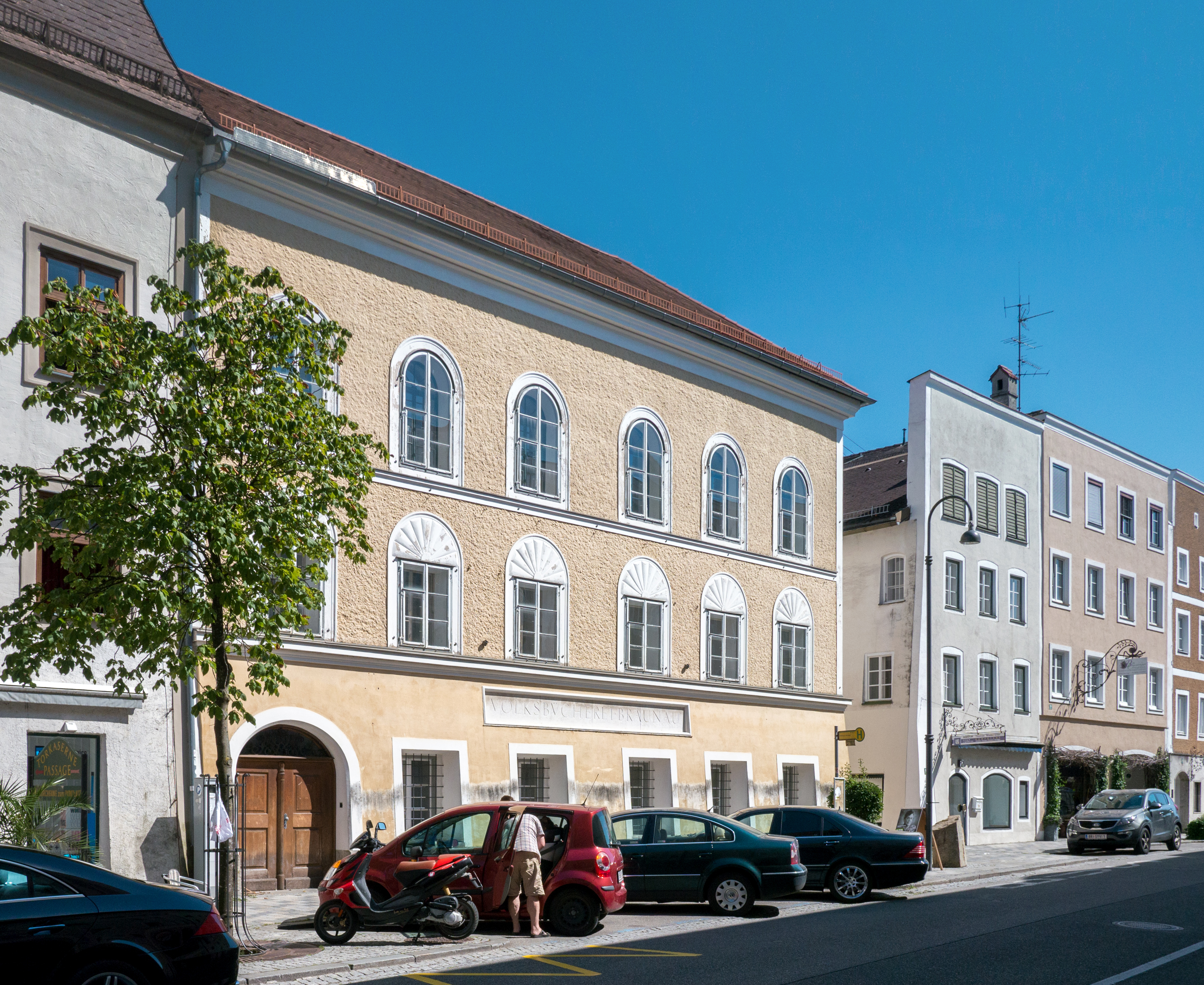
Adolf Hitler's birthplace in Braunau am Inn

Even before he became Minister of the Interior, he was criticized by left-wing historians as mayor. The Texingtal community, of which he was mayor, has been running the Dollfuss Museum in the original birthplace of Engelbert Dollfuss since 1998. In 2018 Karner wanted to deal with the "controversial person Dollfuss". However, Karner saw nothing worth questioning about the uncritical museum. Despite widespread criticism, Interior Minister Gerhard Karner planned on sticking to the plans of his predecessors, Wolfgang Peschorn and Karl Nehammer, and moving the Braunau district police command to Adolf Hitler's birthplace.

=== Anti-Semitism allegations ===
Shortly after he was sworn in as Minister of the Interior, accusations of anti-Semitism were raised against him in a press release from his time as state manager of the ÖVP Lower Austria. In this press release he accused the SPÖ of Lower Austria of working "with gentlemen from America and Israel against the country", with which Karner used anti-Semitic stereotypes for the Jewish Austrian students (JöH). For this reason, the JöH initiated an open letter in which they called for the office of Minister of the Interior to be filled. The signers of this letter include the writer Elfriede Jelinek, the author Doron Rabinovici and the former OGH President Irmgard Griss. Karner defended himself by saying that taking a stand against anti-Semitism was a "personal concern" to him and that during the election campaign "words and sentences were generally used that one would probably no longer use in the same way afterwards". He later publicly apologized for these claims.

== Awards ==
- 2014: Great Silver Medal of Honor for Services to the Republic of Austria
- 2019: Golden Commander's Cross of Honor for Services to the State of Lower Austria
