= Grand Hotel Riccione =

Luxury hotel in Riccione, Italy

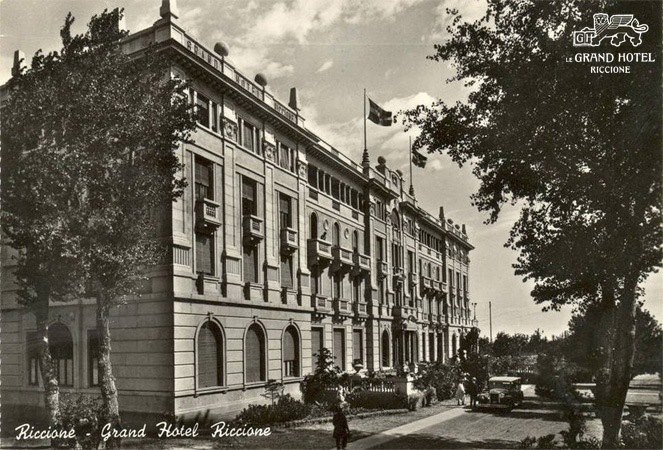
- The façade of the Grand Hotel Riccione, c. 1932
- Interactive map of the Grand Hotel Riccione area

General information
- Status: Completed
- Type: Hotel
- Architectural style: Liberty style (main building); Rationalism (Torre 900)
- Location: Viale Antonio Gramsci 23, Riccione, Italy
- Coordinates: 44°0′5.78″N 12°39′42.67″E
- Construction started: 28 September 1928
- Opened: 15 August 1929; 96 years ago (main building); 1934; 92 years ago (Torre 900)
- Cost: Lit. 4 million (main building)
- Owner: Marebello SpA

Technical details
- Floor count: 10 (3 in the main building, 7 in the Torre 900)

Design and construction
- Architects: Rutilio Ceccolini (main building); Renato Camus (Torre 900)
- Engineer: Galeazzo Pullè

Other information
- Facilities: Swimming pool

The Grand Hotel Riccione is a luxury hotel in Riccione, in the region of Emilia-Romagna, northern Italy.

Inaugurated in 1929, the hotel was founded by Milanese entrepreneur Gaetano Ceschina, and designed by architect Rutilio Ceccolini. In 1934, it was expanded with the Torre 900, a tower annexe designed by Renato Camus. The hotel was used by foreign dignatories visiting Benito Mussolini, Italy's fascist dictator, during his stays in Riccione, while the tower annexe was used as an operational control and security centre by his private secretariat. After the Second World War, the hotel symbolised Riccione's growth as an upmarket seaside resort, hosting extravagant parties. The hotel closed in 2010 following an inheritance dispute. It partially reopened in July 2023, but its management company was declared bankrupt two months later.

The original building's architecture is the Liberty style variant of Art Nouveau, inspired by Gino Coppedè, with sober and elegant lines that subdue Coppedè's eccentricism. It is constructed of predominantly white materials. The hotel's rooms are decorated with crystal chandeliers of Bohemia and Murano. It numbers 300 beds. Previous guests at the hotel include Francesco Cossiga, President of Italy, Princess Haya bint Hussein of Jordan, and Emmanuel Milingo, excommunicated Archbishop of Lusaka.

== History ==
=== Construction ===
The Grand Hotel Riccione was built on the site of the former Martinelli-Amati hospice, the second seaside resort in Romagna for the treatment of scrofulous children after the Matteucci hospice in Rimini. Opened in 1877 by Count Giacinto Martinelli, a local landowner, and Emilio Amati, it was destroyed by the 1916 Rimini earthquakes; only the caretaker's house remains extant in the hotel's garden. Next to the hotel was the Villa Martinelli Soleri, built between 1878 and 1879 and demolished after the Second World War, whose upper-floor terracotta balustrade and Moorish pointed openings are extant.

The Grand Hotel Riccione was the dream of Milanese entrepreneur Gaetano Ceschina, who had inaugurated Cesenatico's Grand Hotel a year earlier, and had previously bought the Kursaal, Riccione's theatre, which he renamed to the Teatro Dante after his late son. Ceschina's investment was likely solicited by Benito Mussolini, Italy's fascist dictator, whose family had begun to take annual summer holidays in Riccione from 1926. The hotel was designed by architect Rutilio Ceccolini and constructed by engineer Galeazzo Pullè. In 1927, Ceccolini had designed a pier for Riccione, though it was never constructed.

=== Inauguration and expansion ===
Works began on the hotel on 23 September 1928. The hotel was constructed in 100 days, at a cost of Lit. 4 million. It was originally surrounded by a large garden and three tennis courts, and numbered 130 rooms with 250 beds and 40 bathrooms. It was inaugurated on 15 August 1929. Five days later, it hosted an inaugural ball for the press, with Edda Mussolini as a guest.

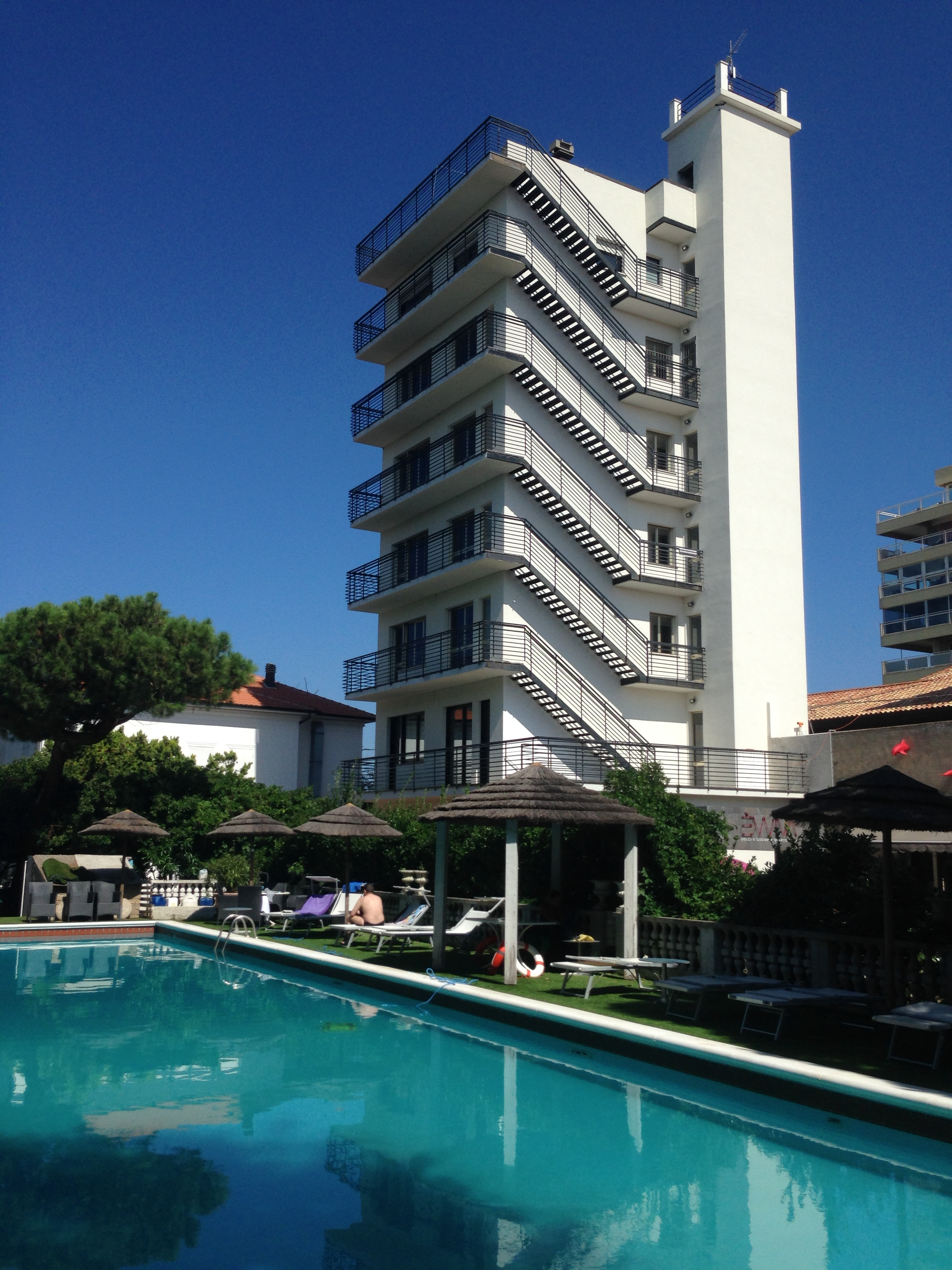
Torre 900 of the Grand Hotel Riccione, August 2014

In 1934, the complex was expanded with a tower annexe, known as the Torre 900 and nicknamed "the skyscraper" (Italian: il grattacielo). The seven-floor tower was created from a dismantled proto-prefabricated building with a different design showcased by Renato Camus, Franco Albini, and Mario Palanti at the Milan Triennial V in Milan's Parco Sempione. The original design was a steel structure to which reinforced concrete panels were bolted. After the fair, the structure was purchased by Ceschina, redesigned by Camus, and assembled in Riccione. The panels were used to extend the main building with an eastern wing, whose façade faces the sea.

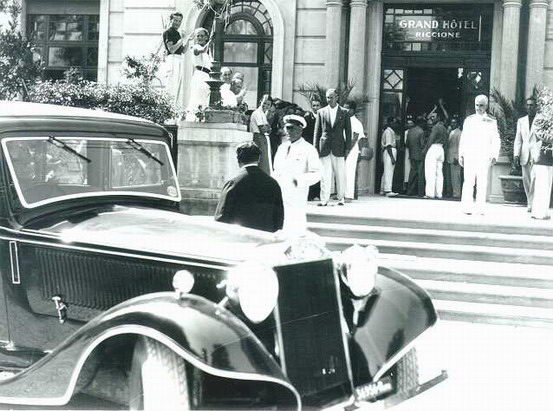
Benito Mussolini in front of the Grand Hotel Riccione, 1935

During Mussolini's stays in Riccione, the hotel was used by visiting dignatories, including Engelbert Dollfuss, Chancellor of Austria. Torre 900 was used as an operational control and security centre by Mussolini's private secretariat. Deliveries for Villa Mussolini were inspected in the tower.

=== Post-war history ===
After the Second World War, the Grand Hotel Riccione became the operational headquarters of Allied troops. An Olympic-size swimming pool was added. On New Year's Eve 1956, the Winter Rose (Rosa d'Inverno), an annual socialite party by invitation only, was hosted at the Grand Hotel Riccione. The party had previously been hosted in the Teatro Dante, and was thereafter hosted in the Grand Hotel Riccione until the party's abolition in 1967. The party included beauty pageants, and was followed by a public party for residents, known as the Rosetta. Organised by the municipal government and the Moto Club Celeste Berardi, guests included Sophia Loren, Fred Buscaglione, and Mina.

In 2010, the hotel closed following an inheritance dispute. Despite its closure, the hotel hosted parties, events, and cultural festivals. The hotel's pool remained open to the public with an entrance fee. In 2014, the Torre 900's 14 apartments were refurbished. In November 2019, Il Resto del Carlino reported that a new building was planned for the complex at the site of the current beachside car park, including streetside shops, a fitness centre, a spa, and a swimming pool.

On 14 July 2022, after taking cocaine, a 21-year-old Riccionese resident drowned in the pool. The hotel's owner was given an 8-month prison sentence, commuted to a fine of €24,000. In July 2023, the hotel management reopened some suites on the first floor, and announced the hotel was undergoing a full renovation, with its third floor to be rented as student accommodation.

In September 2023, the Court of Rimini declared Marebello SpA, the owner of the Grand Hotel Riccione, as bankrupt, with estimated debts of €20 million. It was reported that the complex would likely attain an auction price between €25 and 30 million. In December 2023, the company's liquidation process was suspended by the Court of Appeal of Bologna.

== See also ==
- Grand Hotel Rimini
