= Franz Holzweber =

Austrian assassination accomplice

- Holzweber in his Bundesheer uniform
- Born: 20 November 1904; Vienna, Austria-Hungary
- Died: 31 July 1934 (aged 29); Vienna, Austria
- Known for: Accomplice to the assassination of Engelbert Dollfuss
- Political party: Nazi Party
- Status: Executed by hanging
- Motive: Nazism
- Conviction: High treason
- Penalty: Death

Franz Holzweber (20 November 1904 – 31 July 1934) was an Austrian National Socialist who was an accomplice to the assassination of the Chancellor of Austria, Engelbert Dollfuß, during the July Putsch in 1934.

== Biography ==
Holzweber was a trained electrical engineer and Protestant. He later married and had a child. At the time of the July Putsch, he lived in Mauer, Vienna. Holzweber joined the Nazi Party (member number 300,248) on 8 October 1930. He served as a sergeant in the Bundesheer from 1931 to 1933, when he was discharged for his involvement in Nazism.

With the codename "Captain Friedrich", Holzweber was a leader of the putschists during the raid on the Federal Chancellery on the day of the July Putsch on 25 July 1934. He was an accomplice to the murder of Chancellor Dollfuß. Holzweber and one of the two triggermen in the Chancellor's murder, Otto Planetta, were arrested after the coup's failure. On 31 July 1934, a military court found him guilty of high treason with Planetta, and sentenced both men to death. At his trial, Holzweber denied knowing that the coup would result in a small war.

I was assured that there would be no bloodshed. I was told also that I should find Herr Rintelen at the Chancellery, that the new Government was already formed. Not meeting the leader of the operation at the Chancellery, I disclosed myself at once to Major Fey. I told him, here I stand, and I do not know what I should do. More or less spontaneously I took over the responsibility for our men because no one was there to take charge of the matter.

Holzweber and Planetta were hanged by the executioner Johann Lang in the Vienna Regional Court the same day. They were hanged only three hours after their convictions, the minimum wait time required before carrying out a death sentence in Austria. On the court's instructions, Holzweber was the first to be hanged. His last words were "We die for Germany. Heil Hitler." Their bodies were not handed over to their relatives but instead cremated in the Simmering crematorium. Holzweber's ashes were later buried in the Mauer cemetery.

== Glorification in the Nazi State ==
After the Anschluss on 12 March 1938, Holzweber was praised a national hero and martyr. Following the Anschluss, numerous streets in Berlin and Dresden were named after him. A unit of SS Standard 89 was also named after him.
