= Otto Planetta =

Austrian murderer (1899–1934)

- Planetta in his Bundesheer uniform
- Born: 2 August 1899; Vyškov, Austria-Hungary
- Died: 31 July 1934 (aged 34); Vienna, Austria
- Cause of death: Execution by hanging
- Known for: Assassinating Engelbert Dollfuss
- Political party: Nazi Party
- Status: Executed
- Motive: Nazism
- Convictions: High treason Murder
- Penalty: Death

Otto Planetta (2 August 1899 – 31 July 1934) was an Austrian National Socialist who was one of the two triggermen in the murder of Chancellor of Austria, Engelbert Dollfuss, during the July Putsch in 1934.

== Biography ==
Planetta was born into a Catholic family in Vyškov, Austria-Hungary (now the Czech Republic) in 1899. In 1916 he volunteered for military service in the Austro-Hungarian Army. After the collapse of Austria-Hungary in 1918 at the end of World War I, he joined the Volkswehr, then the Gendarmerie as well as the Bundesheer, the successor of the Volkswehr after 1920. His last military rank was that of staff sergeant. By trade he was a retail salesman. At the time of his death he was married but had no children and lived on Laxenburger Street in Favoriten, the 10th district of Vienna.

In 1930, Planetta joined the Nazi Party (member number 300,772) and, together with Fridolin Glass and Franz Holzweber, founded the "German Soldiers' League for the Registration of National Socialists in the Austrian Federal Army". In 1933, after being discharged from the Bundesheer for being a Nazi sympathizer, Planetta played a leading role in the formation of SS Standarte 89 (later SS-Standarte 89 "Holzweber"), which was created under the direct orders of Adolf Hitler to be a group of shock troops designed to create chaos on the streets of Austria.

On 25 July 1934, at the beginning of the July Putsch, a failed coup attempt by Austrian Nazis, Planetta fired one of two fatal shots at Austrian Chancellor Engelbert Dollfuss. On 30 July, a military tribunal tried Planetta and his accomplice, Franz Holzweber, for murder and high treason. The trial ended on 31 July. While giving evidence, Planetta said he fired at Dollfuß, but did not know who he was, since the room was dark. Despite Dollfuß being less than 1.52 metres (5 ft 0 in) tall, Planetta claimed to have seen a big man in the room, whom he ordered to put his hands in the air.

"I felt my revolver arm touched, and then saw an other man fall to the floor. It was the Chancellor. I vainly tried to get a doctor."

In response to Planetta's telling of what happened, the presiding judge, Albert Oberweger, replied "Your story is too stupid to be believed." At the end of the trial, Planetta, with tears in his eyes, maintained that he had killed Dollfuss by accident.

"I do not know how many hours I have to live. But one thing I would like to say, I am no cowardly murderer. It was not my intention to kill. One more thing. As a human being I am sorry for my deed, and I beg the wife of the late Chancellor to forgive me."

Planetta and Holzweber were both found guilty and sentenced to death. They were hanged by the executioner Johann Lang in the Vienna Regional Court on 31 July 1934. They were hanged only three hours after their convictions, the minimum wait time required before carrying out a death sentence in Austria. On the court's instructions, Planetta was the second to be hanged. His last words were "Heil Hitler." Their bodies were not handed over to their relatives but instead cremated in the Semmering crematorium. Planetta's ashes were later buried in the Dornbach Cemetery (Group 13, Row 3, No. 33). When Holzweber's widow attempted to place a ribbon of German colors on the coffin, officials told her that if she did, she would be charged with high treason. When the officiating clergyman attempted to deliver a funeral oration, he was forced to stop. He was saying that Holzweber died for an idea when a police officer intervened and ordered him to be silent. Less than a week after the executions of Planetta and Holzweber, their lawyer, Eric Fuehrer, was arrested for being a Nazi sympathizer. During the trial, after every other defense had been rejected by the court, Fuehrer had made an appeal based on Nazism. He argued that Planetta and Holzweber could not be guilty of high treason, since they did not recognize Austria as a state. He referenced their viewpoint, stating, "One People; One Empire".

"I do not accept the new law of treason formulated under the new Constitution. The accused's ideal can be expressed in one sentence, namely, 'One People; One Empire,' which is the Nazi slogan."

== Glorification in the Nazi State ==
After the Anschluss of Austria on 12 March 1938, Planetta was elevated to the status of a "Hero of Austrian Freedom". Numerous streets in "Greater Germany" were named after him, such as Gemmrigheimer Street in Zuffenhausen, Pfarrgasse in Baden bei Wien and Habsburger Street in Dresden. Today's Maria- and Rudolf-Fischer-Hof in Vienna-Favoriten as well as student fraternities, e.g. the fraternity Bruna Sudetia in Vienna, were also named after him. None of these still bear his name.

== Literature (selection) ==
- Walter Kleindel with the collaboration of Hans Veigl: Das große Buch der Österreicher. 4500 Personendarstellungen in Wort und Bild. Namen, Daten, Fakten. Kremayr & Scheriau, Wien 1987, ISBN 3-218-00455-1.
- Robert Berger (Ed.), Peter Krause, Gottfried Stangler: Gaudeamus igitur. Studentisches Leben einst und jetzt. Schallaburg, 28. Mai bis 18. Oktober 1992. Ausstellungskatalog. Katalog des Niederösterreichischen Landesmuseums, Band N.F. 296, ZDB-ID 968582-0. Amt der Niederösterreichischen Landesregierung, Abt. III/2, Kulturabteilung, Wien 1992, ISBN 3-85460-063-1.
- Assassination in Vienna, by Walter B. Maass, published by Charles Scribners's Sons, New York
- The Order of the Death's Head: The Story of Hitler's SS, by Heinz Zollin Höhne and Richard Barry
- První zemřel kancléř, by Vladimír Bauman a Miroslav Hladký, Prague 1968
- Na dně byla smrt, by Otakar Brožek a Jiří Horský, Prague 1968
