= Johann Trnka =

Austrian murderer (1912–1950)

Johann Trnka (21 March 1912 – 24 March 1950) was a convicted murderer who was the last person to be sentenced to death and executed in Austria.

== Crime ==
In order to steal radio sets, Johann Trnka posed as a painter in 1946 and thus gained access to the apartments of two elderly women in Vienna, who he attacked, robbed, and then murdered. Trnka was charged with these robbery murders. The trial took place under the presidency of Regional Court President Otto Nahrhaft in the Regional Court for Criminal Matters Vienna, the "Grey House".

Trnka was sentenced to death for double murder and was executed via hanging on 24 March 1950, at the execution site of the "Grey House", in Vienna. The executioner was a cinema assistant who had already been the executioner at executions on the strangulation gallows during the Ständestaat.

== Legacy ==
Trnka's conviction for murder was carried out under Austrian law of the Second Republic. After World War II, capital punishment had been declared permissible in Austria in ordinary proceedings for murder, but was once more deleted from the civil codes in 1950 and retained only in military law. Trnka's execution was the 31st and last of a person sentenced to death by an Austrian court in the postwar period. On 7 February 1968, the National Council unanimously decided to remove from the Constitution the possibility of creating summary courts or other forms of exceptional jurisdiction. Article 85 of the Federal Constitution has since read, "The death penalty is abolished."

== See also ==
- Capital punishment in Austria
- List of most recent executions by jurisdiction

== Bibliography ==
- Anna Ehrlich: „Vom Ende des Schreckens bis heute – Die Bewältigung der Vergangenheit“, in: Hexen, Mörder, Henker – Die Kriminalgeschichte Österreichs vom Mittelalter bis zur Gegenwart. Wien 2006, S. 229.
- „... wird mit dem Tode bestraft!“, in: Öffentliche Sicherheit 5–6/10, Forum Justizgeschichte, S. 30 f. ( (PDF; 155 kB) Online-Ressource).
