= Engelbert Dollfuss =

Chancellor of Austria from 1932 to 1934

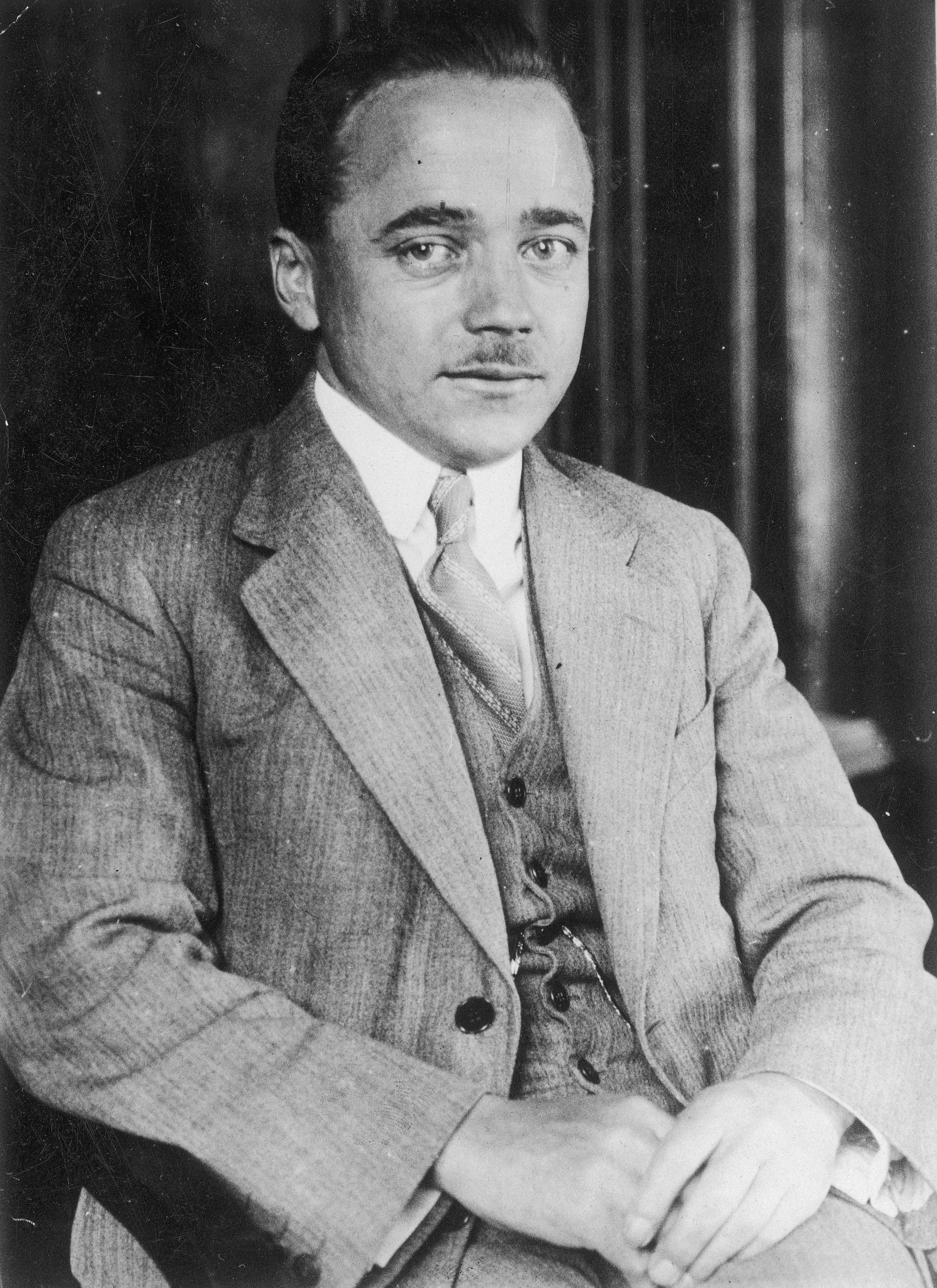
- Dollfuss in 1932

Chancellor of Austria
- In office 20 May 1932 – 25 July 1934
- President: Wilhelm Miklas
- Vice-Chancellor: Franz Winkler; Emil Fey; Ernst Rüdiger Starhemberg
- Preceded by: Karl Buresch
- Succeeded by: Kurt Schuschnigg

Leader of the Fatherland Front
- In office 20 May 1933 – 25 July 1934
- Preceded by: Party established
- Succeeded by: Ernst Rüdiger Starhemberg

Minister of Foreign Affairs
- In office 20 May 1932 – 10 July 1934
- Chancellor: Himself
- Preceded by: Karl Buresch
- Succeeded by: Stephan Tauschitz

Minister of Agriculture and Forestry
- In office 18 March 1931 – 25 June 1934
- Chancellor: Karl Buresch; Himself
- Preceded by: Andreas Thaler
- Succeeded by: Ernst Rüdiger Starhemberg

Personal details
- Born: 4 October 1892 Texing, Lower Austria, Austria-Hungary
- Died: 25 July 1934 (aged 41) Vienna, Austria
- Cause of death: Assassination by gunshot
- Resting place: Hietzinger Cemetery, Vienna, Austria
- Party: Fatherland Front (1933–1934)
- Other political affiliations: Christian Social Party (until 1933)
- Spouse: Alwine Glienke
- Children: Hannerl; Eva; Rudolf
- Parents: Josef Wenninger (father); Josepha Dollfuss (mother)
- Education: University of Vienna
- Cabinet: Dollfuss I–II

Military service
- Allegiance: Austria-Hungary (1914–1918); Federal State of Austria
- Branch/service: Austro-Hungarian Army (1914–1918)
- Years of service: 1914–1918; 1934 (Note: During the Austrian Civil War and July Putsch)
- Rank: Oberleutnant
- Unit: Kaiserschützen (1914–1918)
- Battles/wars: World War I; Italian Front; Austrian Civil War (Note: After his service in WW1); July Putsch (Note: After his service in WW1) X
- Awards: Military Merit Cross 3rd Class Bronze Military Merit Medal (2 times) Silver Medal for Bravery 1st Class Karl Troop Cross Wound Medal

Engelbert Dollfuss (Note: German: [ˈɛŋəlbɛɐ̯t ˈdɔlfus]) (alternatively Dollfuß; 4 October 1892 – 25 July 1934) was an Austrian politician and dictator who served as chancellor of Austria between 1932 and 1934. Having served as Minister for Forests and Agriculture, he ascended to Federal Chancellor in 1932 in the midst of a crisis for the conservative and nationalist government. This crisis culminated in the self-elimination of the Austrian Parliament, a coup sparked by the resignation of the presiding officers of the National Council. Suppressing the Socialist movement in the Austrian Civil War and later banning the Austrian Nazi Party, he cemented his rule through the First of May Constitution in 1934. Later that year, Dollfuss was assassinated as part of a failed coup attempt by Nazi agents. His successor Kurt Schuschnigg maintained the regime until Adolf Hitler's Anschluss in 1938.

== Early life ==
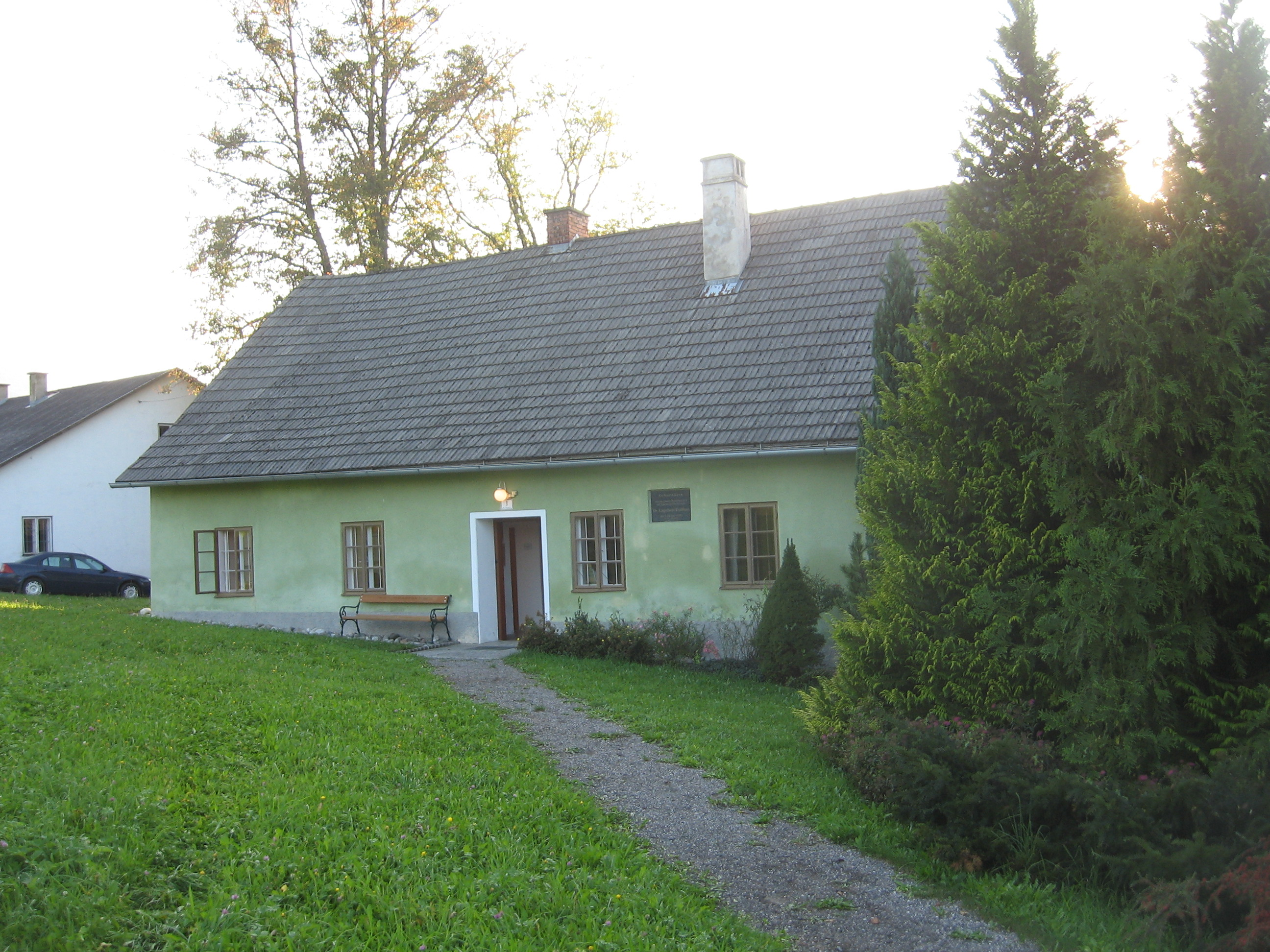
Dollfuss's birthplace in Texingtal

Dollfuss was born to a poor, lower middle-class peasant family in the hamlet of Great Maierhof in the commune of St. Gotthard near Texingtal in Lower Austria. Young Dollfuss spent his childhood in his step-father's house in the nearby commune of Kirnberg, where he also went to elementary school. The local parish priests helped to finance Dollfuss's education, as his parents were unable to do so by themselves alone. He attended high school in Hollabrunn. After graduating from high school, Dollfuss intended to become a priest, and thus he enrolled at the University of Vienna to study theology, but after a few months changed course and started studying law in 1912. As a student, he earned a livelihood by giving lessons. He became a member of the Students' Social Movement, a student organisation dedicated to social and charitable work among the workers.

As World War I broke out, Dollfuss was reported to be recruited in Vienna but was rejected because he was two centimetres shorter than the minimum. Fully grown, he was less than 1.52 m (5 ft 0 in) in height, and later was nicknamed "Millimetternich", a portmanteau of Millimeter (German for millimeter) and Klemens von Metternich. The same day he was rejected in Vienna, Dollfuss went to St. Pölten where the recruiting commission for his district was located and insisted on being recruited, and, even though he did not meet the minimum height standards, he was accepted. As a volunteer, he had a right to choose a regiment in which he would serve, and Dollfuss opted for the Tyrolese militia also known as the Kaiserschützen. In September 1914 he graduated from the Brixener Officer's School with the rank of Ensign and was transferred to the Imperial-Royal 2nd Tyrolian Rifle (Landesschützen) Regiment in Bosen. He was soon promoted to the rank of Lieutenant. He served for 37 months at the Italian Front, south of Tyrol. By 1916 he was promoted to First lieutenant. Over the course of the war, he was awarded the Silver Bravery Medal 1st Class (1916), the Karl Troop Cross (1917), the Wound Medal with one wound stripe and the Bronze Military Merit Medal twice, the Military Merit Cross 3. Class with War Decoration and Swords (1918) and, after the war, the Austrian War Memorial Medal with Swords.

After the war, he was still a student and was employed by the Lower Austrian Peasants' Union, which helped him to secure his material existence, and it was here where Dollfuss gained his first political experience. Being recognised for the abilities he showed at the Union, he was sent for further studies to Berlin. In Berlin, he began to garner dislike for some of his professors, as academia there was substantially influenced by liberalism and socialism. In his studies, he devoted himself to the Christian principles of economics. In Germany, he became a member of the Federation of German Peasants' Union and of the Preussenkasse – essentially, a central bank for member cooperatives, where he gained practical experience. In Germany, he met his future wife Alwine Glienke, a descendant of a Pomeranian family. Dollfuss often met with Carl Sonnenschein, leader of social activities of students and the pioneer of the Catholic movement in Berlin.

After returning to Vienna, he was a secretary of the Lower Austrian Peasants' Union. He devoted his efforts to consolidating that industry. Dollfuss was instrumental in the founding of the regional Chamber of Agriculture of Lower Austria, becoming its secretary and a director; the Federation of Agriculture and the Agricultural Labourers' Insurance Institute; in organising the new Agrarian policy of Lower Austria and in laying the foundations for the corporative organisation of agriculture. A few years later, he was a representative of Austria at the International Agrarian Congress, where his proposals made him internationally known in that sphere. He was seen as an unofficial leader of the Austrian peasantry.

On 1 October 1930 Dollfuss was appointed the president of the Federal Railways, the largest industrial corporation in Austria. There, Dollfuss came into contact with all branches of the industry. In March 1931, he was appointed Federal Minister of Agriculture and Forestry.

== Chancellor of Austria ==
On 10 May 1932, Dollfuss, aged 39 and with only one year's experience in the Federal Government, was offered the office of Chancellor by President Wilhelm Miklas, also a member of the Christian-Social Party. Dollfuss did not immediately respond, instead spending the night in his favourite church praying, returning in the morning for a bath and a spartan meal before finally replying to the President that he would accept the offer. Dollfuss was sworn in on 20 May 1932 as head of a coalition government between the Christian-Social Party, the Landbund – a right-wing agrarian party – and Heimatblock, the parliamentary wing of the Heimwehr, a paramilitary ultra-nationalist group. The coalition assumed the pressing task of tackling the problems of the Great Depression. Much of the Austro-Hungarian Empire's industry had been situated in the areas that became part of Czechoslovakia and Yugoslavia after World War I as a result of the Treaty of Saint-Germain. Postwar Austria was therefore economically disadvantaged.

Dollfuss's support in Parliament had slim majority; his coalition had only a one-vote majority.

== Dollfuss as dictator of Austria ==
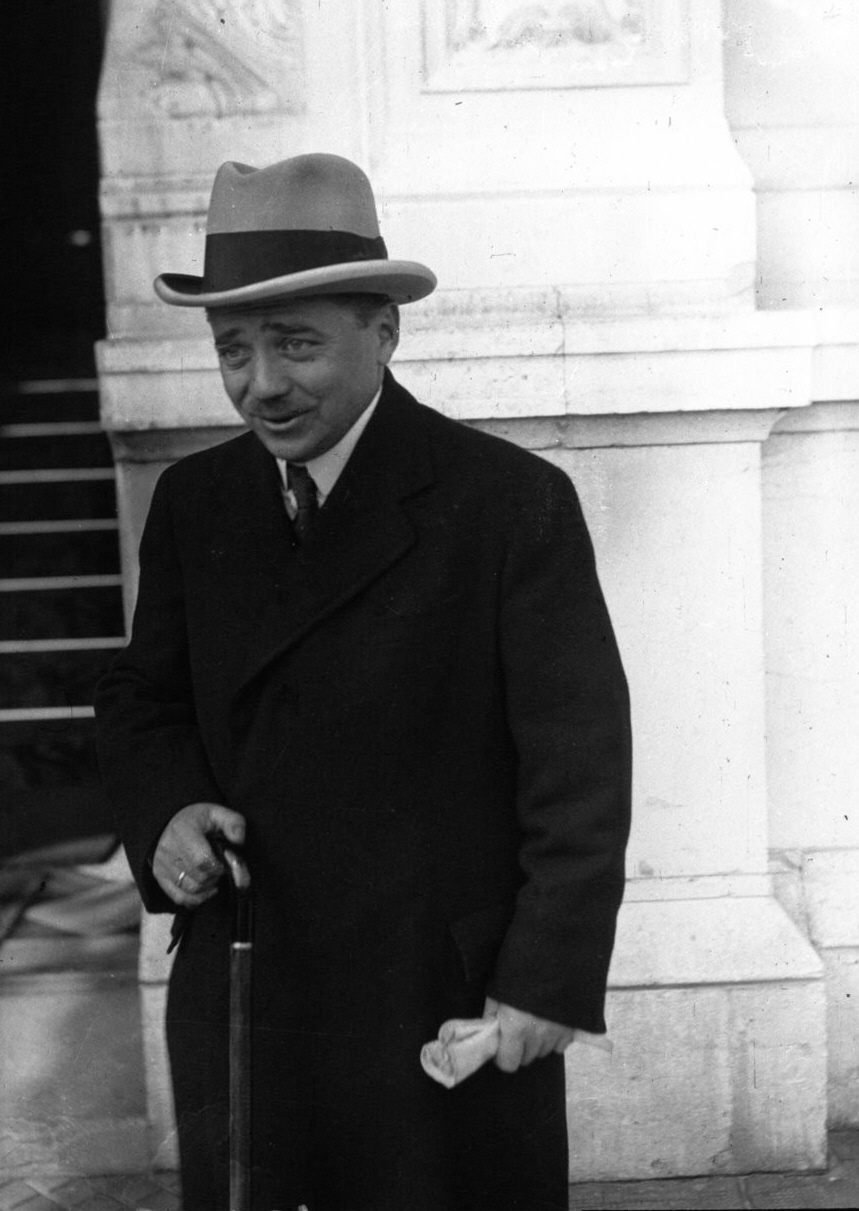
Chancellor Dollfuss in Geneva, 1933

=== Ascent to power ===
In March 1933, a constitutional impasse arose over irregularities in the voting procedure in the Austrian parliament. The Social Democratic president of the National Council (the lower house of parliament), Karl Renner, resigned to be able to cast a vote as a parliament member. As a consequence, the two vice presidents, belonging to other parties, resigned as well in order to be able to vote. Without a president, the parliament could not conclude the session. Dollfuss took the three resignations as a pretext to declare that the National Council had become unworkable and advised President Wilhelm Miklas to issue a decree adjourning it indefinitely.

On March 7, Dollfuss announced his government had assumed emergency powers based on the "Wartime Economy Authority Law," which had been passed in 1917. From that point onwards, he governed by emergency decree, effectively seizing dictatorial powers. When the National Council wanted to reconvene on 15 March, days after the resignation of the three presidents, Dollfuss had the police bar entrance to the chamber, effectively eliminating democracy in Austria.

Dollfuss was concerned that with German National Socialist leader Adolf Hitler as Chancellor of Germany from January 1933, the Austrian National Socialists (DNSAP) could gain a significant minority in future elections (according to fascism scholar Stanley G. Payne, should elections have been held in 1933, the DNSAP could have mustered about 25% of the votes – contemporary Time magazine analysts suggest higher support of 50%, with a 75% approval rate in the Tyrol region bordering Nazi Germany). In addition, the Soviet Union's influence in Europe had increased throughout the 1920s and early 1930s. Dollfuss banned the Communist Party of Austria on 26 May 1933 and the DNSAP on 19 June 1933. Under the banner of the Fatherland Front, he later established a one-party dictatorship rule largely modelled after fascism in Italy, banning all other Austrian parties – including the Social Democratic Labour Party (SDAPÖ). Social Democrats however continued to exist as an independent organization, nevertheless, though without its paramilitary Republikanischer Schutzbund, which until banned on 31 March 1933 could have mustered tens of thousands against Dollfuss's government.

=== The Fatherland Front ===
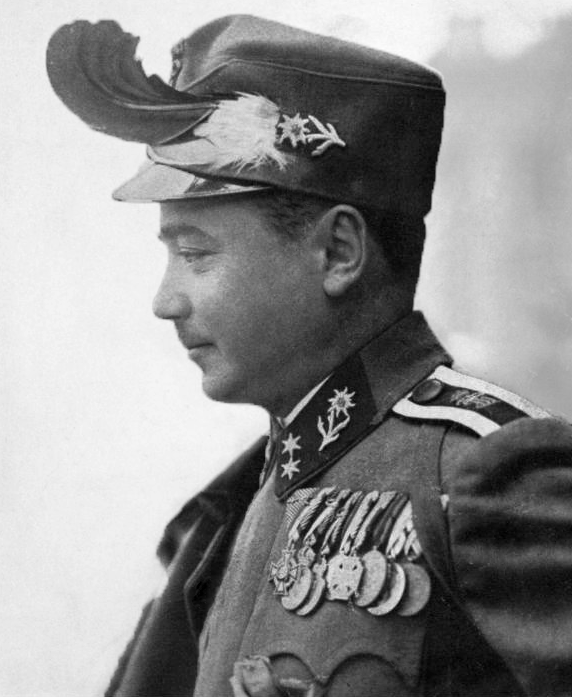
Austrian Chancellor Engelbert Dollfuß wearing the Heimwehr uniform (1933)

Dollfuss modelled the Fatherland Front according to Catholic corporatist ideals with anti-secularist tones and in a similar way to Italian fascism, dropping Austrian pretenses of unification with Germany as long as the Nazi Party remained in power there. According to Frank McDonough, the Fatherland Front "resembled a Fascist party with its similar uniforms, a copycat swastika symbol and salutes, but it had no antisemitic policies". In August 1933, Benito Mussolini's regime issued a guarantee of Austrian independence. Dollfuss also exchanged "Secret Letters" with Mussolini about ways to guarantee Austrian independence. Mussolini had an interest in Austria forming a buffer zone against Nazi Germany. In addition, Mussolini and Dollfuss were personal friends. Meanwhile, Dollfuss was opposed both to the Nazi Party and to any left-wing force, and would soon go on to wage a "two-front war" against the Nazis and Social Democrats at home.

In September 1933 Dollfuss merged his Christian Social Party with elements of other nationalist and conservative groups, including the Heimwehr (which encompassed many workers who were unhappy with the radical leadership of the socialist party) to form the Vaterländische Front, though the Heimwehr continued to exist as an independent organization until 1936, when Dollfuss's successor Kurt von Schuschnigg forcibly merged it into the Front, instead creating the unabidingly loyal Frontmiliz as a paramilitary task-force. Dollfuss was shot and wounded in an assassination attempt on 3 October 1933 by Rudolf Dertil, a 22-year-old who had been ejected from the military for his pro-Nazi views and had joined the Nazi Party in 1932. Dertil was sentenced to five years in prison for attempted murder. In the aftermath of the attempted assassination, Dollfuss declared martial law, which allowed for the resumption of capital punishment in Austria.

=== Austrian Civil War ===
In its drive to eliminate the Social Democrats' Schutzbund, the Dollfuss government searched the homes and meeting places of its members for weapons. On 12 February 1934, the Austrian Civil War was sparked by the armed resistance of the Linz branch of the Social Democrats to the search of their party headquarters. Word of the fighting in Linz spread quickly, and additional armed conflicts broke out, primarily in Austria's industrial regions and Vienna. The Schutzbund was greatly outnumbered by the police and army, which used artillery against the insurgents. In addition, the general strike which had been called to support the uprising failed to materialize. The result was the collapse of the rebellion by 15 February, with the deaths of about 350 persons, roughly equally divided between civilians, insurgents, and government forces. The Social Democrats were outlawed by the Federal government on 12 February 1934, and their leaders were imprisoned or fled abroad.

=== New constitution ===
Dollfuss staged a rump parliamentary session with just Fatherland Front members present in April 1934 to have a new constitution approved, effectively the second constitution in the world espousing corporatist ideas (after that of the Portuguese Estado Novo). The session retrospectively made all the decrees already passed since March 1933 legal. The new constitution became effective on 1 May 1934 and swept away the last remnants of democracy and the system of the First Austrian Republic, establishing the Federal State of Austria. Based on Italian Fascism, Austria officially became a one-party authoritarian state. Opposing the Anschluss, Dollfuss and the Fatherland Front made heavy use of the Austrians' Catholic religion in an attempt to cultivate a sense of nationalism and prevent it from being absorbed by Nazi Germany.

== Assassination ==
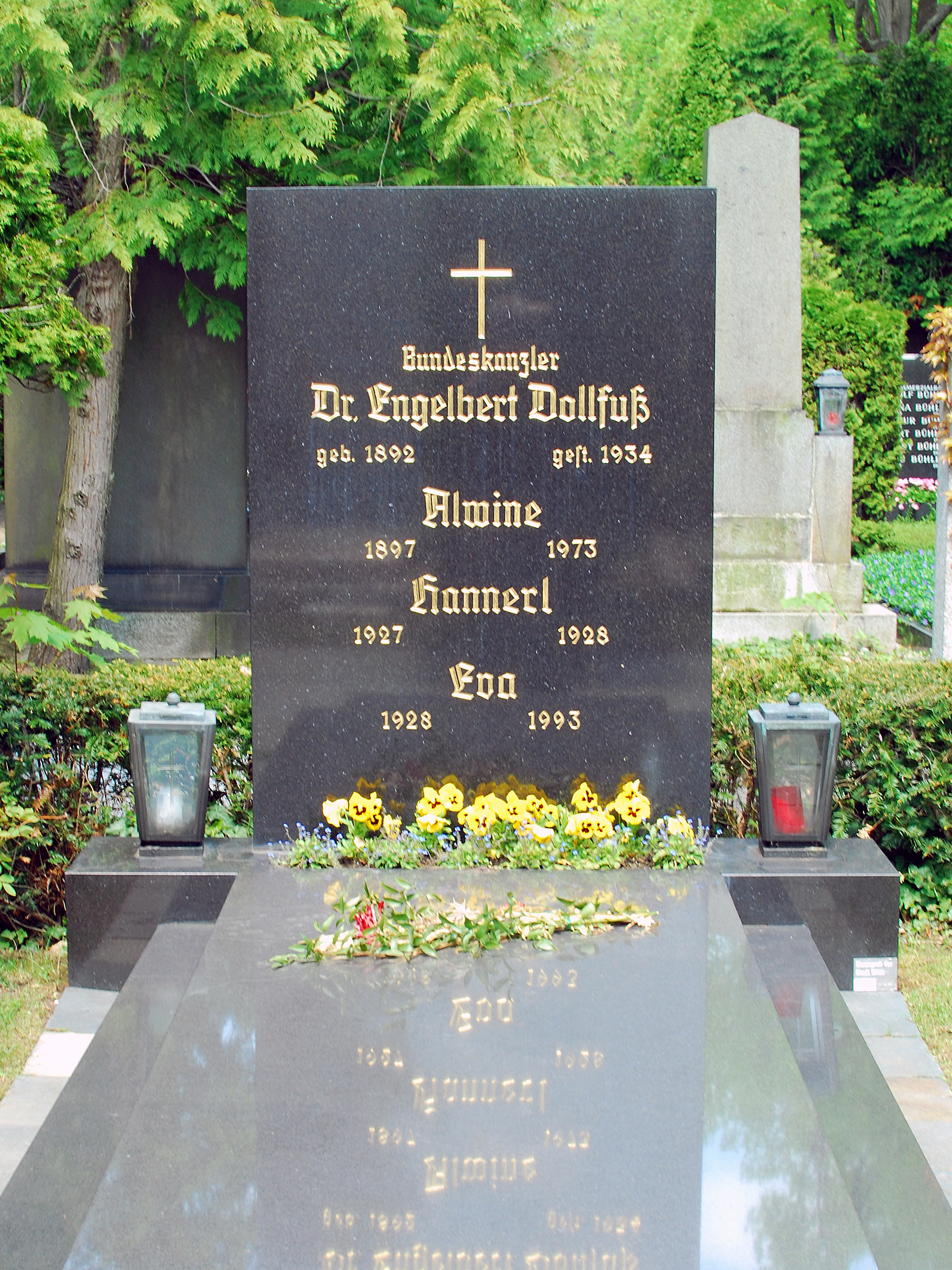
Grave of Engelbert Dollfuss

As a result of his consistent opposition to Nazi demands, Dollfuss was assassinated on 25 July 1934 by a group of Austrian Nazis, including Otto Planetta, Franz Holzweber, Rudolf Prochaska, and Paul Hudl, who entered the Chancellery building and shot him in an attempted coup d'état. Planetta, Holzweber, and Hudl were amongst those captured after the coup. In the mass trials that took place after the coup, Hudl was sentenced to life in prison, while Planetta and Holzweber were sentenced to death and executed by hanging on 31 July 1934. Hudl was released under an amnesty in 1938.

In his dying moments, Dollfuss asked for Viaticum, the Eucharist administered to a dying person, but his assassins refused to give it to him. Mussolini had no hesitation in attributing the attack to the German dictator: the news reached him at Cesena, where he was examining the plans for a psychiatric hospital. Mussolini personally gave the announcement to Dollfuss's widow, who was a guest at his villa in Riccione with her children. He also put at the disposal of Ernst Rüdiger Starhemberg, who spent a holiday in Venice, a plane that allowed the prince to rush back to Vienna and to face the assailants with his militia, with the permission of President Wilhelm Miklas.

Mussolini also mobilised a part of the Italian army on the Austrian border and threatened Hitler with war in the event of a German invasion of Austria to support the putsch. Then he announced to the world: "The independence of Austria, for which he has fallen, is a principle that has been defended and will be defended by Italy even more strenuously", and then replaced in the main square of Bolzano the statue of Walther von der Vogelweide, a Germanic troubadour, with that of Drusus, a Roman general who conquered part of Germany. This was the greatest moment of friction between Italian Fascism and National Socialism and Mussolini himself came down several times to reaffirm the differences in the field.

The assassination of Dollfuss was accompanied by uprisings in many regions in Austria, resulting in further deaths. In Carinthia, a large contingent of northern German Nazis tried to seize power but were subdued by the Italian units nearby. At first, Hitler was jubilant, but the Italian reaction surprised him. Hitler became convinced that he could not face a conflict with the Western European powers, and he officially denied liability, stating his regret for the murder of the Austrian Chancellor. He replaced the ambassador to Vienna with Franz von Papen and prevented the conspirators from entering Germany, also expelling them from the Austrian Nazi Party. The Nazi assassins in Vienna, after declaring the formation of a new government under Austrian Nazi Anton Rintelen, previously exiled by Dollfuss as Austrian Ambassador to Rome, surrendered after threats from the Austrian military of blowing up the Chancellery using dynamite, and were subsequently tried and executed by hanging. Kurt Schuschnigg, previously Minister of Education, was appointed new chancellor of Austria after a few days, assuming the office from Dollfuss's deputy Starhemberg.

Out of a population of 6.5 million, approximately 500,000 Austrians were present at Dollfuss's burial in Vienna. He is interred in the Hietzing cemetery in Vienna. His wife, Alwine Dollfuss (who died in 1973) was later buried beside him. Two of his children, Rudolf and Eva, were in Italy as guests of Rachele Mussolini at the time of his death, an event which saw Mussolini himself shed tears over his slain ally.

== In literature ==
In Bertolt Brecht's 1941 play The Resistible Rise of Arturo Ui, Dollfuss is represented by the character "Dullfeet".

Gordon Brook Shepard wrote a book in 1961 detailing Dollfuss and his rise to power.

In the novel Vienna Melody by Ernst Lothar, the younger brother / son of the two major characters participates in the assassination of Dollfuss and is executed by firing squad for his role.

== In popular culture ==
Published by the Film Academy of Baden-Württemberg in Youtube,"Heldenkanzler" is a animated short film about Dollfuss career on politics.

== Works ==
- Das Kammersystem in der Landwirtschaft Österreichs. Agrarverlag, Wien 1929.
- Mertha, Rudolf, Dollfuß, Engelbert: Die Sozialversicherung in der Landwirtschaft Österreichs nach dem Stande von Ende März 1929. Agrarverlag, Wien 1929.
- Der Führer Bundeskanzler Dr. Dollfuß zum Feste des Wiederaufbaues. 3 Reden. 1. Mai 1934. Österr. Bundespressedienst, Wien 1934.
- Tautscher, Anton (Hrsg.): So sprach der Kanzler. Dollfuss' Vermächtnis. Aus seinen Reden. Baumgartner, Wien 1935.
- Weber, Edmund (Hrsg.): Dollfuß an Oesterreich. Eines Mannes Wort und Ziel. Reinhold, Wien 1935.
- Maderthaner, Wolfgang (Hrsg.): „Der Führer bin ich selbst." Engelbert Dollfuß – Benito Mussolini. Briefwechsel. Löcker, Wien 2004, ISBN 3-85409-393-4.

== Notes ==
Political offices
Preceded by Karl Buresch	Chancellor of Austria; 1932–1934	Succeeded by Kurt Schuschnigg
