= Villa Mussolini =

Seaside villa in Riccione, Italy

- Villa Mussolini
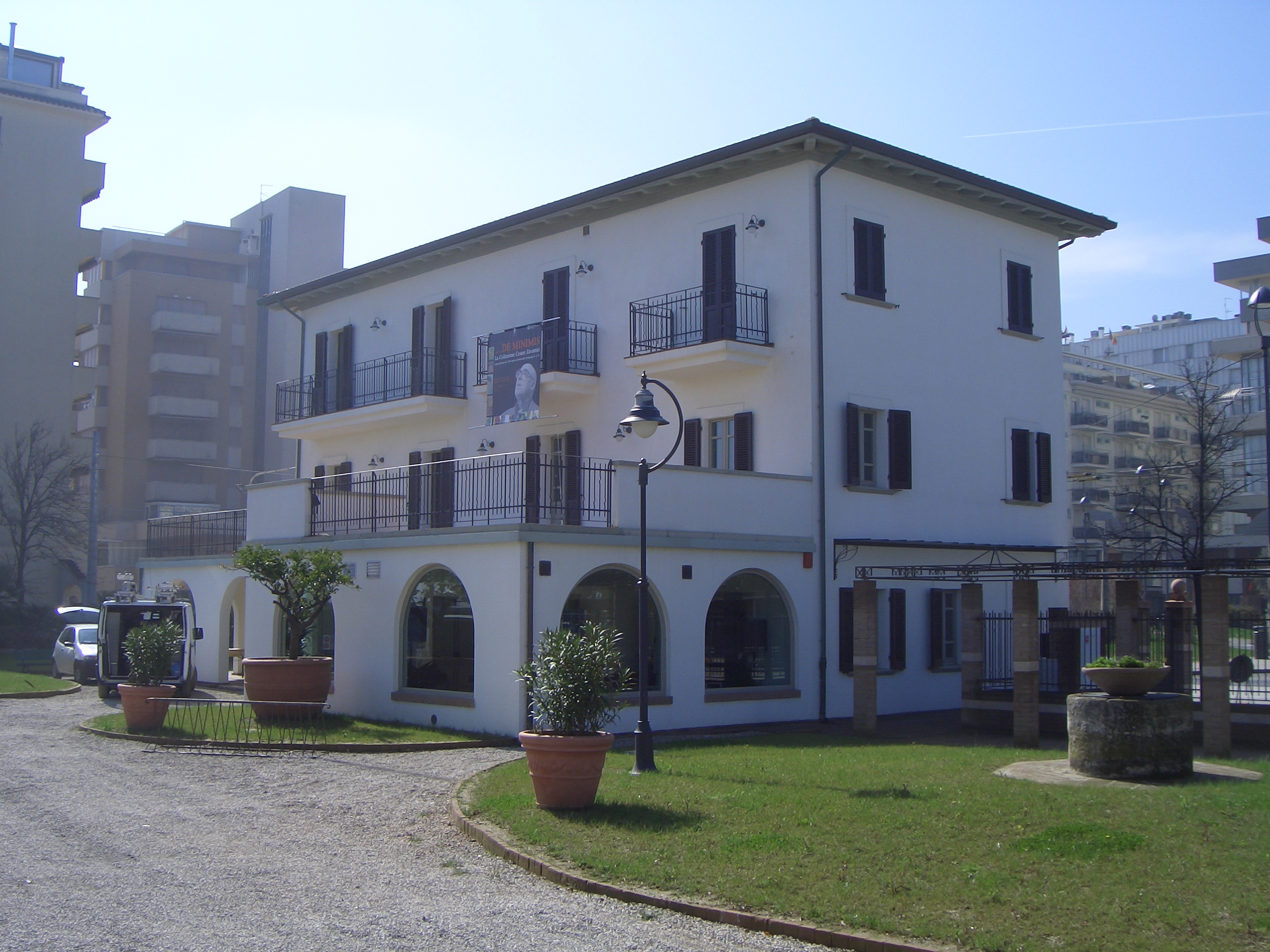
- Villa Mussolini in April 2007
- Interactive map of the Villa Mussolini area
- Former names: Villa Monti; Villa Margherita
- Etymology: Benito Mussolini

General information
- Status: Completed
- Location: Viale Milano 31, Riccione, Emilia-Romagna, Italy
- Coordinates: 44°0′12.50″N 12°39′36.01″E
- Current tenants: Municipality of Riccione
- Named for: Benito Mussolini
- Completed: 1892
- Renovated: 1940, 2005

Technical details
- Floor count: 3

Design and construction
- Architect: Ferdinando Mancini
- Known for: Summer holiday home of the Mussolinis

Other information
- Public transit: Route 11 trolleybus; Local buses from Piazzale Curiel

Villa Mussolini is a seaside villa in Riccione, in Emilia-Romagna, northern Italy.

Built in 1892, the original two-storey villa had thirteen rooms and a side-turret on its south side. In 1934, it was purchased by Rachele Guidi, second wife of Benito Mussolini, Italy's fascist dictator. The Mussolinis used it as a summer holiday home, and expanded the property in 1940, adding an additional floor. During his stays, Mussolini would conduct government business from the villa and host notable guests and foreign dignitaries.

In 1997, the villa – by then called Villa Margherita – was purchased by the Cassa di Risparmio di Rimini, who loaned it to Riccione's municipal government. After a one-million-euro restoration, the villa reopened as Villa Mussolini in 2005. It hosts cultural events and exhibitions, as well as civil wedding ceremonies. The villa's name and use continues to attract local controversy.

== History ==
=== Early years (1892–1934) ===
The villa was built in 1892 for Marquise Eugenia Beccadelli, who divided her time between Florence and Bologna. Its architect was Ferdinando Mancini. The villa features on the 1895 map drawn for the state's first bathing resort concessions.

The two-storey villa originally had thirteen rooms, including a garage, greenhouse, and laundry room; it included a side-turret on its south side, which faced east towards the main entrance. The property was set in 1,397 square metres (15,040 sq ft) of land.

Beccadelli died in 1904, and the villa subsequently passed into the ownership of Giulio Monti of Ferrara, from which derived the name of Villa Monti. It was then sold to the family of Count Angeletti of Bologna, who sold it to Giulia Galli Bernabei, its last owner before the Mussolinis.

=== Purchase by Rachele Guidi (1934) ===
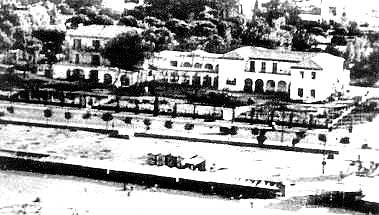
Villa Mussolini in 1935

For some years before their purchase of the villa, the family of Benito Mussolini, Italy's fascist dictator, had spent their summer holidays on the riviera romagnola; Mussolini and his second wife, Rachele Guidi, were themselves from Romagna's countryside. In 1924 and 1925, the family stayed in Cattolica. In 1926, they stayed in the villa of Count Terzi in Riccione, opposite the Grand Hotel Des Bains and near the Mater Admirabilis church. Between 1927 and 1932, they stayed at Domenico Galavotti's Hotel Al Lido on Piazzale Roma. In 1933, the family moved to Pietro Tontini's Hotel Milano Helvetia; Tontini and Mussolini were comrades in the First World War.

Guidi was keen to purchase a property in Riccione for their next summer stay. She paid 170,000 lire for Galli Bernabei's villa; the purchase deed was signed on 2 July 1934, and registered in Forlì on 21 July 1940. Galli Bernabei did not want to sell the villa, and was persuaded only after the intervention of Frangiotto Pullè, Riccione's mayor. According to one account, Guidi purchased the villa using money intended as a donation to the Opera Nazionale Balilla, leaving her husband under the impression that the villa was a gift from the people of Riccione. Other versions say that Guidi used money from local party subscriptions, or royalties from Mussolini's articles in Fortune.

=== Mussolini summer holiday home (1934–44) ===
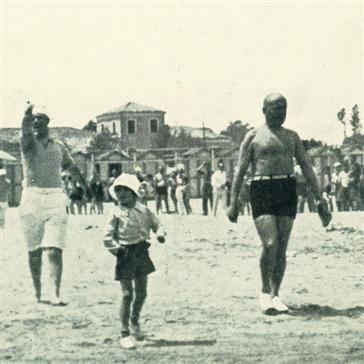
Mussolini and his son, Romano, on Riccione's beach in 1932

Mussolini would conduct government business from Riccione during his stays, including welcoming visiting dignatories. Guests at the villa included singer Gea della Garisenda, senator Teresio Borsalino, and Austrian chancellor Engelbert Dollfuss. Dollfuss' family was staying in Riccione during his assassination in July 1934, and it was at Villa Mussolini that Galeazzo Ciano, Italy's Minister of Foreign Affairs, informed Mussolini of Operation Barbarossa in June 1941. When the Fascist regime fell on 25 July 1943, Mussolini's children Romano and Anna Maria were in Riccione with Orsola, first wife of Vittorio Mussolini, and Gina, widow of Bruno Mussolini. It is believed that the villa included a cinema room which showed foreign films prohibited by the regime.

Mussolini would arrive in Riccione from Rome on a Savoia-Marchetti three-engined seaplane. A 75-metre (246-foot) ship, Aurora, would be stationed off Riccione's coast. Mussolini would bathe in the sea, where he would be greeted by crowds and photographers. He was noted to swim breaststroke, somewhat archaically. Clara Petacci, Mussolini's mistress, would stay at the Grand Hotel Rimini during Mussolini's stays in Riccione. It is believed that Pettaci and Mussolini would be escorted by motorboats to secret offshore meetings. In her memoirs, Luciana Castellina, future member of the European Parliament, recalls playing tennis with Anna Maria in Riccione.

The villa was guarded by 150 soldiers, reaching 300 during the summer holidays. Mussolini's guard, dressed in black, were nicknamed furnarèin (cockroaches) by locals for their ability to appear unexpectedly from street corners. Guards stationed along the promenade would hurry slow walkers in the section by the Villa Mussolini.

As a result of his association with the area, Riccione's development is cliched as dependent on Mussolini's patronage. Mussolini called Riccione a "land of heroes, most fascist since birth".

On 1 July 1939, the Rimini–Riccione route 11 trolleybus line opened near the villa, replacing a previous tramway. The line terminated at Piazzale dei Giardini; it was reconfigured shortly after its construction to bring trolleybuses to terminate on the piazzale's mountain-facing side, thereby avoiding trolleybuses passing near Villa Mussolini and disturbing guests. Guidi used the trolleybuses during her stays at the villa.

=== 1940 expansion and renovation ===
In 1940, the property was expanded with the annexation of the land between the present-day Viale Milano, Via dei Giardini, and Viale Ippolito Nievo. The property was thus brought to a total area of 6,000 square metres (1.5 acres).

Some of the existing buildings in the annexed area were destroyed and replaced with a tennis court and garden, including a vegetable garden and shed. A high perimeter wall was built, and new buildings were erected for Mussolini's children on the new land.

The main villa itself was renovated with the addition of a third floor and a ground-floor veranda, bringing it to a total of 27 rooms. The works were overseen by the Swiss engineer Dario Pater using populit, an unstable material of concrete and chipboard for prefabricated buildings developed under Italy's autarky. The works cost 6 million lire, paid by the Ministry of the Interior.

=== Post-war abandonment (1944–97) ===
After the Second World War, Villa Mussolini remained in Guidi's ownership: like many of their other villas in Romagna, it was not registered in Mussolini's name, and so the villa was not entirely requisitioned by the state. As Mayor of Riccione, Galli Barnabei, the villa's pre-fascist owner, unsuccessfully attempted to regain the villa's possession. On 24 July 1946, a court in Rome ordered the confiscation of Mussolini's assets; the authorities in Forlì executing the order included the villa's front part, which was ceded to Riccione's municipal government, who destroyed the patio to restore Viale Milano.

Guidi and Anna Maria continued to visit the villa in the immediate post-war years. Guidi sold the property to a Bolognese company in 1952: according to Romano, she began to prefer holidays in Ischia, feeling that Riccione was too closely connected to tumultuous and unhappy years. The villa became the site of various commercial activities, including a restaurant named "Perry" and a veterinary clinic for dogs. Opened in 1967, the restaurant manager conserved the rooms but introduced Spanish furniture; it was considered a fashionable place to eat. The villa was abandoned to decay in the 1980s; according to a report in La Stampa on 2 October 1979, the villa had become "a curiosity only for a few tourists".

In the post-war years, the villa came to be known as Villa Margherita, commonly believed to have been the villa's name before the Mussolinis, though incorrectly: Margherita was the name of a separate, neighbouring villa belonging to the Galli Bernabei family that was demolished in the 1940 expansion.

In 1979, Terzo Pierani, Riccione's communist mayor, suggested that Riccione should "tear down the dictator's house"; the local communist party maintained an unsuccessful campaign for its demolition. At a price of 92 million lire, Pierani's administration purchased the garden to transform it into a public green area, reversing the 1940 expansion. The buildings in the area were demolished in October 1979, including a restaurant that had been built illegally. The area now houses Piazzale Eugenio Curiel, which includes a bus station and car park. To some historical irony, it became the terminus of the route 11 trolleybus in 1994.

=== Purchase and 2005 renovation (1997–) ===
In the 1990s, the Friends of Riccione Association campaigned for the villa's reacquisition. In 1997, it was purchased by the Cassa di Risparmio di Rimini, who loaned it to the municipal government for its restoration. In turn, the municipal government was contractually able to use the villa for thirty years. The restoration cost €1 million, divided 3:1 between the municipal and provincial governments.

The villa reopened in 2005. Controversially, Romano Mussolini was among 350 guests at the reopening ceremony on 17 July 2005, at the invitation of the municipal mayor; the Communist Refoundation Party had threatened to disrupt the ceremony. The Cassa di Risparmio, which by then had become Banca Carim, advertised the property for sale in December 2017; Villa Mussolini was still reported to be in the bank's possession in March 2023.

== Current use ==
Since its 2004 reopening, Villa Mussolini has been used for cultural events and exhibitions, as well as civil wedding ceremonies. Villa Mussolini also hosts the annual DIG Award, a prize for documentary film investigative journalism that was dedicated to Ilaria Alpi until 2014.

== Name controversy ==
Following the 2005 renovation, the centre-left municipal administration officially restored the 'Villa Mussolini' name, to local controversy. As a result of the villa's name, some entertainers have refused to perform at the venue.

In August 2020, Lodovico Zanetti, the president of Forlì's ANPI chapter, suggested that the villa be renamed after the Matatia family, three Jewish brothers from Corfu who settled in Riccione in the 1920s. The eldest brother, Nissim, bought a villa within eyesight of Villa Mussolini; his family was deported and killed in Auschwitz. Roberto Matatia, Nissim's nephew, published a book in January 2014 recounting the family's history in proximity to Villa Mussolini, entitled The Inconvenient Neighbours.

In April 2021, the municipality freely loaned the villa to an agency promoting Riccione's candidacy for UNESCO heritage. The loan was criticised for attaching Mussolini's name to the candidacy.

== Villino Pater "Cacetta" ==
The villa's complex included a cottage, known as Villino Pater or "Cacetta", which is still extant on Via Latini. The villa was owned by the engineer Dario Pater. It was twinned with another villa and connected by a portico; its twin, which no longer exists, belonged to Mussolini's nephew. Like the 1940 additions to Villa Mussolini, the villa was constructed using populit.

In October 2019, the municipal government sold the villa to a Milanese real estate company for €600,000. It was advertised for sale again in February 2020, for €980,000. A section of the wall collapsed in August 2020, bringing down also part of the attic and the floor of the first floor.

== See also ==
- Grand Hotel Riccione – the principal building was used by visiting dignatories during Mussolini's stays in Riccione, while the tower annexe, designed by Renato Camus, was used as an operational control and security centre by Mussolini's private secretariat.
- Villa Torlonia, Rome – Mussolini's state residence in Rome.
