= Grand Hotel Rimini =

Luxury hotel in Rimini, Italy

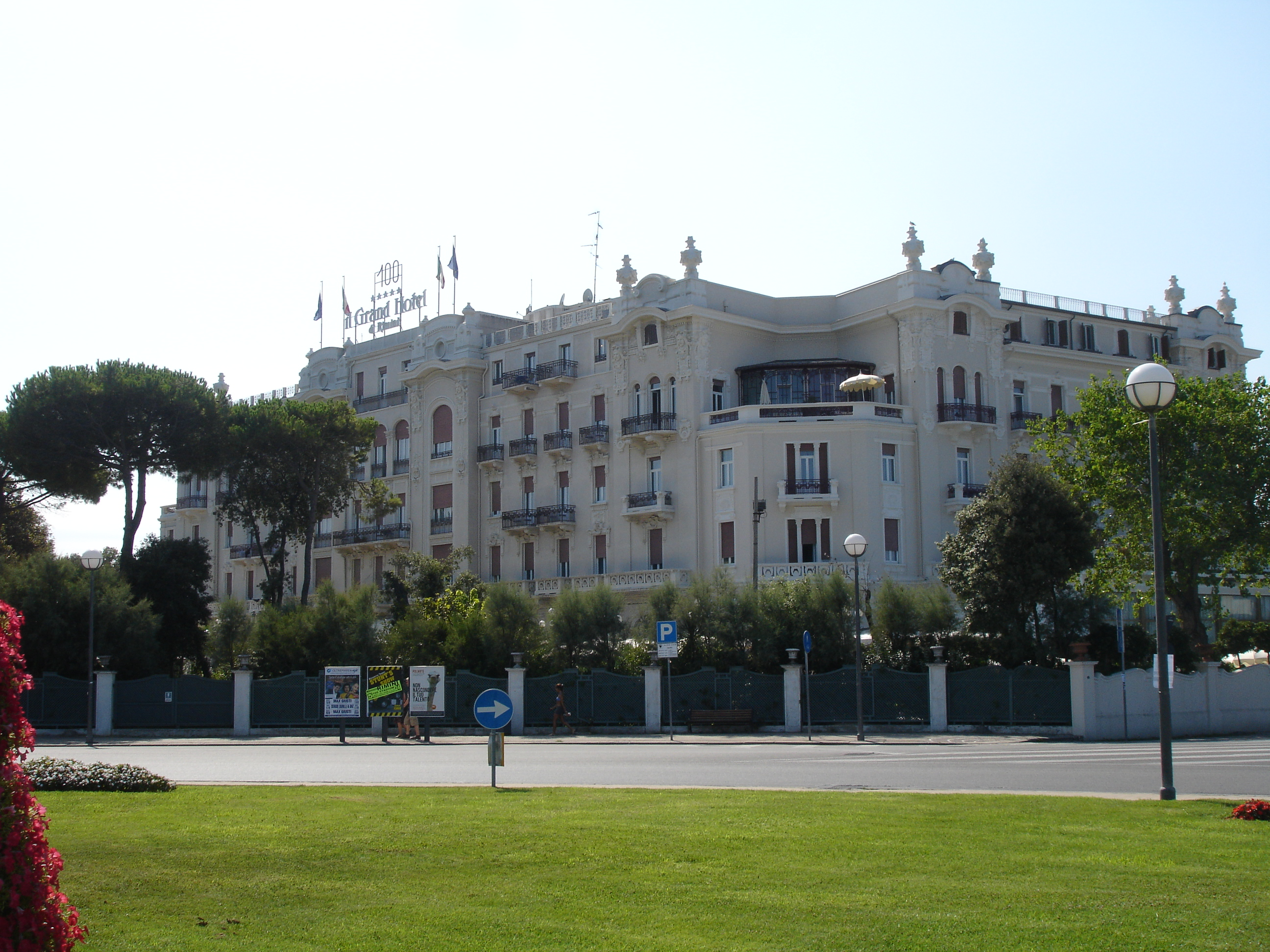
- The façade of the Grand Hotel Rimini, August 2009
- Interactive map of the Grand Hotel Rimini area

General information
- Status: Completed
- Type: Hotel
- Architectural style: Liberty style
- Location: Rimini, Italy
- Coordinates: 44°4′21.39″N 12°34′36.29″E
- Opened: 1 July 1908; 118 years ago
- Owner: Batani Select Hotels

Design and construction
- Architect: Paolito Somazzi
- Engineer: Giacomo Guazzoni

Other information
- Number of rooms: 121
- Number of restaurants: 1
- Number of bars: 1
- Facilities: Spa, indoor swimming pool, sauna, steam room, private beach

Website
- www.grandhotelrimini.com (in Italian)

The Grand Hotel Rimini is a five-star hotel located in Rimini, in the region of Emilia-Romagna, northern Italy. As one of Rimini's most well-known buildings, the hotel is known for its elegance, classic style, and association with filmmaker Federico Fellini.

It is the only five-star hotel in the city, as well as the only coastline hotel with a private beach. Previous guests at the hotel include Max Grundig, Princess Diana, Mikhail Gorbachev, Sharon Stone, and Sophia Loren. The hotel is managed by Batani Select Hotels, led by Paola Batani.

== History ==
=== Construction and inauguration ===
On 7 March 1906, Rimini's mayor, Camillo Duprè, signed a contract in Milan for the construction of a luxury hotel in Rimini. Its construction was contracted to the Società Milanese Alberghi Ristoranti e Affini (SMARA), which managed Rimini's nascent seaside industry. The hotel was intended to attract upmarket tourism, complementing Rimini's Kursaal bathing establishment. At a meeting on 21 November 1906, Rimini's municipal council approved the project drawings.

The hotel was designed by architect Paolito Somazzi. Though the project was also assigned to his brother, Ezio Somazzi, many architectural scholars consider it only the work of Paolito: Ezio was then in his early architectural career.

The hotel was constructed in under two years by the construction company of Giacomo Guazzoni. The hotel was inaugurated on 1 July 1908.

=== Early years ===
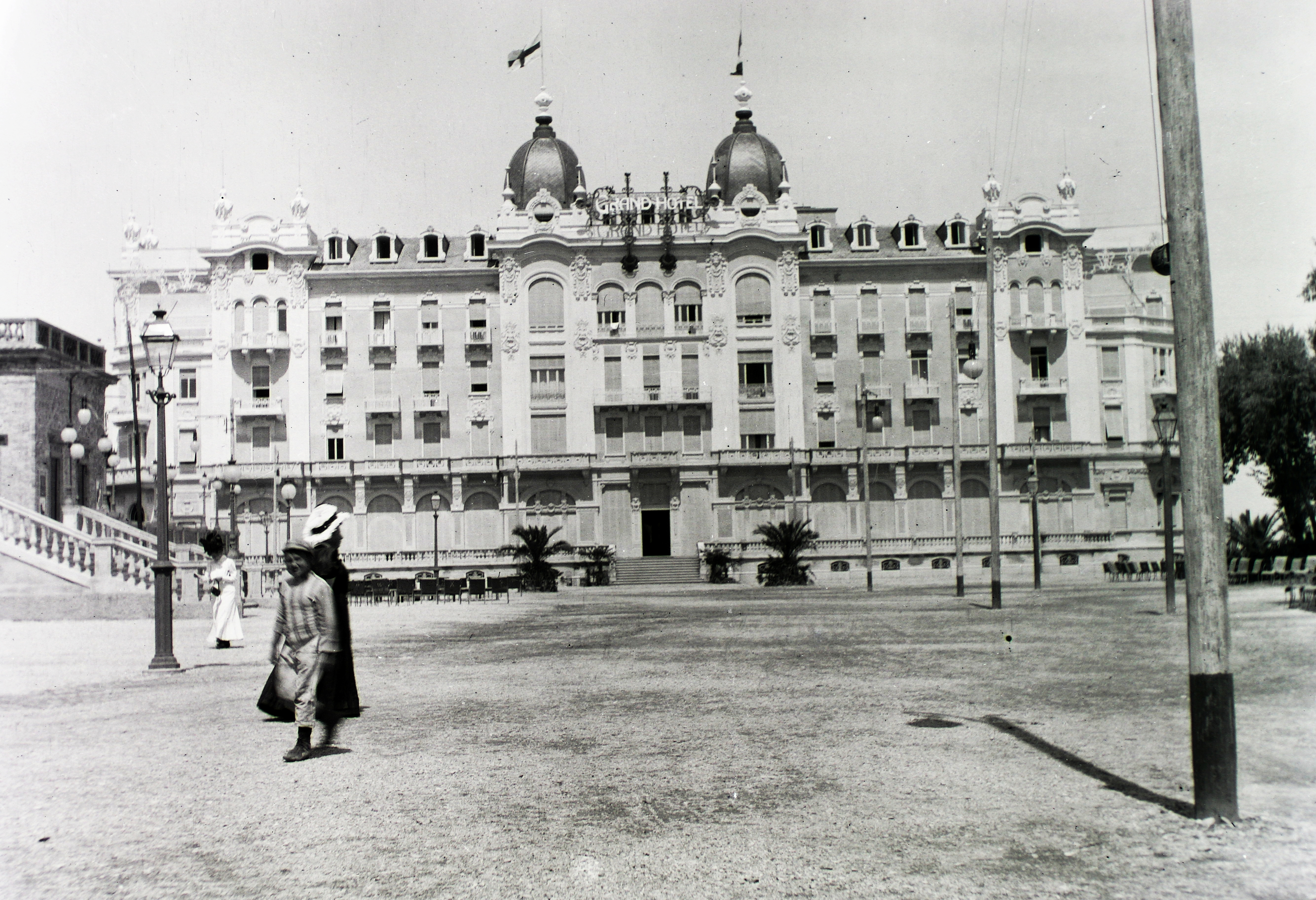
The Grand Hotel in 1910, showing the two domes before their destruction in the fire

On the afternoon of 14 July 1920, the hotel was engulfed by a major fire, which drew firefighters from as far away as Bologna and military soldiers from Rimini's barracks. Opportunists stole from the hotel's rooms. Anacleto Ricci, 17-year-old boy scout, died during the fire as he helped guests evacuate. His funeral was a well-attended event in the city; Ricci was posthumously awarded a gold medal for civil valour.

On 30 April 1931, Rimini's municipal government purchased the hotel from Banco di Napoli, which had become the hotel's owner over time. Podestà Pietro Palloni entrusted its management to the Società Anonima Immobiliare Adriatica of Bologna, which held it until 1940.

Clara Petacci, mistress of Benito Mussolini, Italy's fascist dictator, would stay at the Grand Hotel during Mussolini's summer holidays at the Villa Mussolini in Riccione. It is believed that Pettaci and Mussolini would be escorted by motorboats to secret offshore meetings. Renato Zangheri, future mayor of Bologna, said that he would play tennis with Petacci in the Grand Hotel's courts during her days waiting for the next meeting.

During the Second World War, the hotel was occupied by German then Allied forces, hosting military commands.

=== Postwar history ===
In 1949, the Grand Hotel hosted a hotel fair, which would be held annually until being moved to Rimini Fiera on 1 December 1968. It hosted four editions of Miss Italia in the 1950s.

At the end of 1952, the hotel's structure was sold to Manfredo Durante, with the obligation to restore the hotel. In 1963, it was bought by Pietro Arpesella. From 1983 to 1990, comedian Paolo Cevoli worked as a manager in the hotel.

In 1994, the Grand Hotel Rimini was recognised as a national monument; it is under the protection of the Superintendent of Fine Arts.

In 1992, the hotel was taken over by Chiacig Advance Hotel, a hotel management company founded by three families (The Chiacig family from Udine, with Alfredo Chiacig as main founder, the Jannotta family from Castione della Presolana-Bergamo and the Bernardi family from Rimini). For many years, the Grand Hotel Rimini was a main sponsor for Mens Sana Basketball Siena.

In 1997, the hotel was bought by Andrea Angelo Facchi, a local entrepreneur who also acquired San Marino's Grand Hotel Primavera and Rimini's Villa Des Vergers. In 2002, the hotel was bought by Pier Paolo Bernardi and Casto Ianotta. In 2007, it was purchased by Antonio Batani for €65 million.

== Architecture ==
The hotel is built in Liberty style, the Italian variant of Art Nouveau. The rooms are decorated with period furniture and an original parquet. Many rooms include balconies, some overlooking the coast. The hotel features large carpets and living rooms. Its reception rooms and corridors are decorated with gilded stucco, with Murano chandeliers lining the corridors.

The hotel is surrounded by gardens with olive and fir trees, magnolias, and roses.

The 1920 fire destroyed the hotel's two domes on its façade, which added a Nordic touch to the hotel's architecture. The domes' reconstruction was discussed in 2009.

== Facilities ==
The hotel numbers 121 rooms. Its facilities include a bar, restaurant, spa, indoor swimming pool, sauna, and steam room. It has a private beach, and is the only hotel to have one in Rimini.

The hotel has four regal suites and two Versace design suites. The complex includes a second building across the street, called the Residenza, where there are modern-style rooms. Next to the Grand Hotel stands the Conference Centre. Built in 1992 and equipped with state-of-the-art technological equipment, it hosts national and international meetings and conferences.

== In popular culture ==
=== Federico Fellini ===
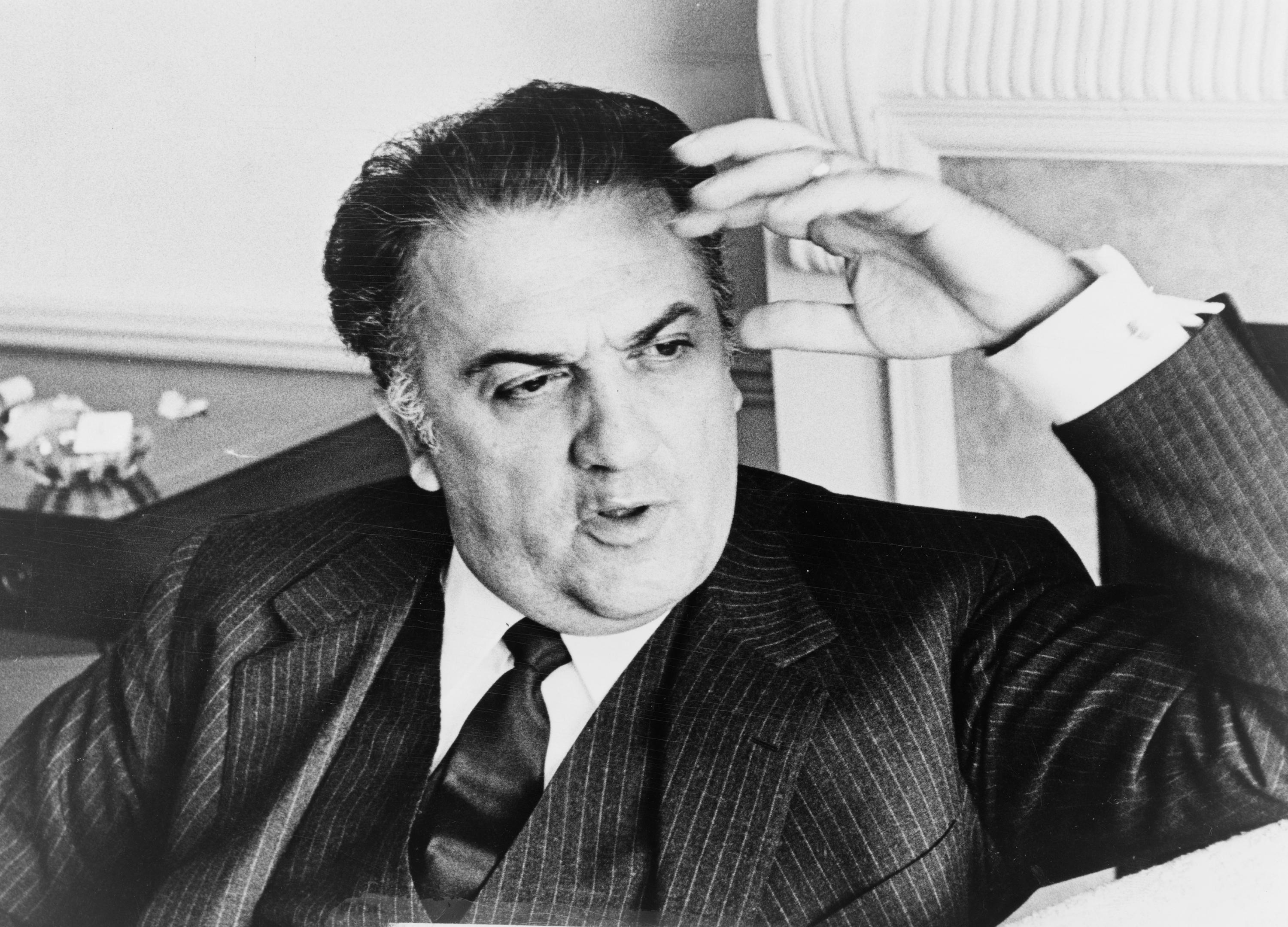
Federico Fellini

The hotel is best known for its association with Italian filmmaker Federico Fellini. In his youth, Fellini worked at the hotel as a caricaturist. Reflecting on his childhood memories, Fellini said of the hotel:

Crimes, kidnappings, nights of mad love, blackmails, suicides, the garden of torture, the goddess Kali: everything happened at the Grand Hotel. On summer evenings, it became Istanbul, Baghdad, Hollywood. On the terraces, protected by curtains of thick plants, we could glimpse the bare backs of women who seemed to be made of gold, entwined by male arms in white tuxedos. A scented breeze carried us at times with syncopated music, languid enough to faint.

— Federico Fellini

The Grand Hotel features heavily in Amarcord (1973), which won an Oscar for best foreign-language film in 1974. In the film, it is nicknamed la vecchia Signora (the old lady). The hotel that features in the film is not the one in Rimini: Fellini had built a copy in Cinecittà for the film. Once successful, Fellini would often stay at the hotel's suite 315. The suite's previous guests included Petacci, Farouk of Egypt, Prince Luigi Amedeo, Eleonora Duse, Filippo Tommaso Marinetti, Pietro Mascagni, and Enrico Caruso, who was assigned the suite after asking for a view resembling the Gulf of Naples. Fellini was a good friend of Pietro Arpesella, the hotel's owner.

In summer 1993, Fellini stayed at the Grand Hotel after recovering from an operation for abdominal aortic aeurysm in Zurich. The staff were unable to secure his suite 315, and he stayed in suite 316 instead. On the afternoon of 3 August, a member of staff found Fellini in his room after suffering a stroke; Fellini later said that he "was saved by an angel dressed as a sailor". He was rushed to Rimini's hospital, and transferred to Ferrara on 20 August. Fellini did not return to Rimini after his hospitalisation, and died in Rome on 31 October 1993.

=== Other ===
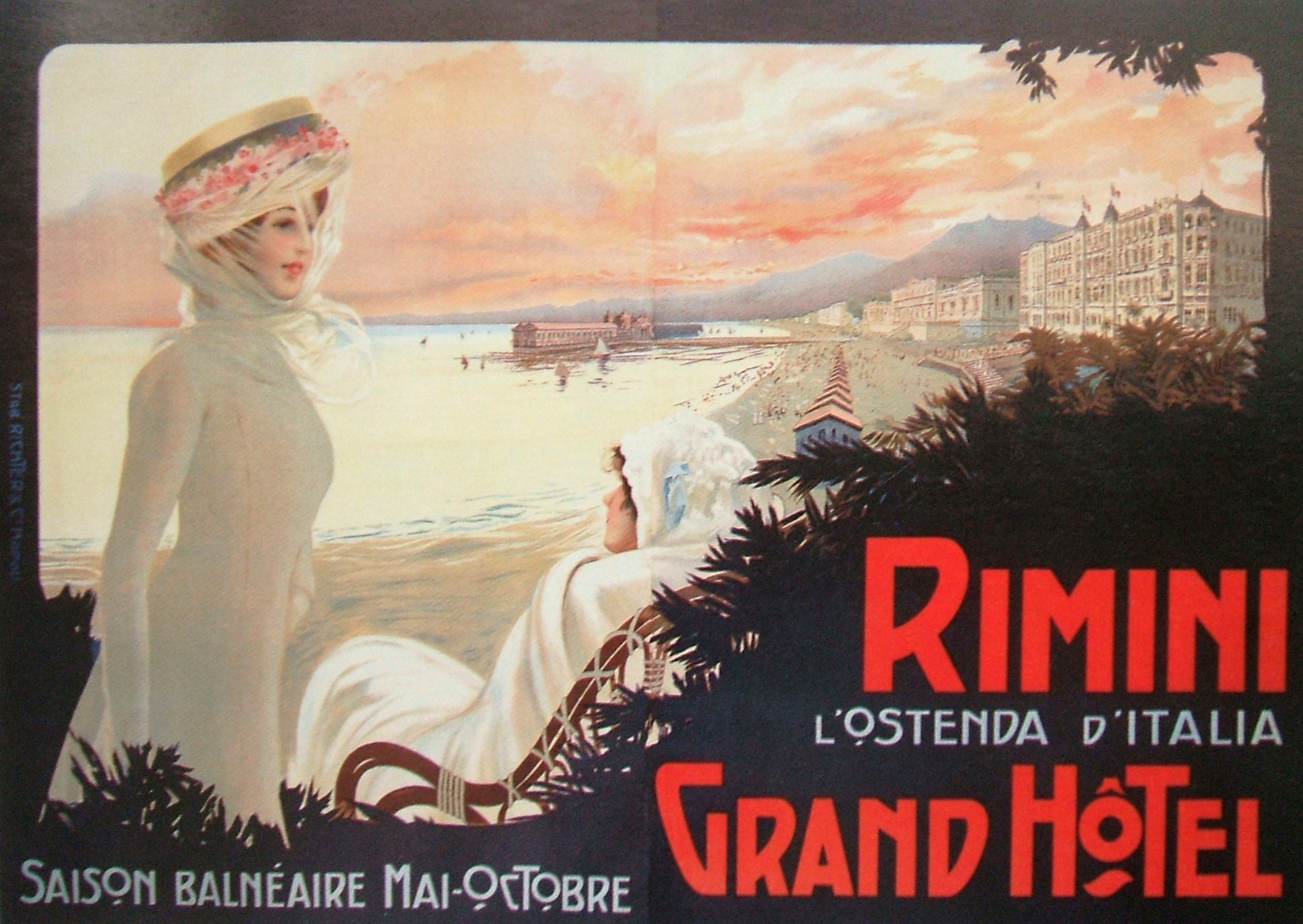
A 1908 poster advertising the bathing season in Rimini, featuring the Grand Hotel

The hotel is the subject of a Romagnol poem by Raffaello Baldini in Ad Nòta (1995); the collection won the Bagutta Prize. In the poem, the narrator says that he goes to the Grand Hotel "whenever I want, towards midday, to drink an aperitivo", eats olives and chips, circulates among the guests while drinking and smoking, and "[if you] squint your eyes, you seem beautiful yourself".

== See also ==
- Grand Hotel Riccione
