= Texingtal =

- Municipality
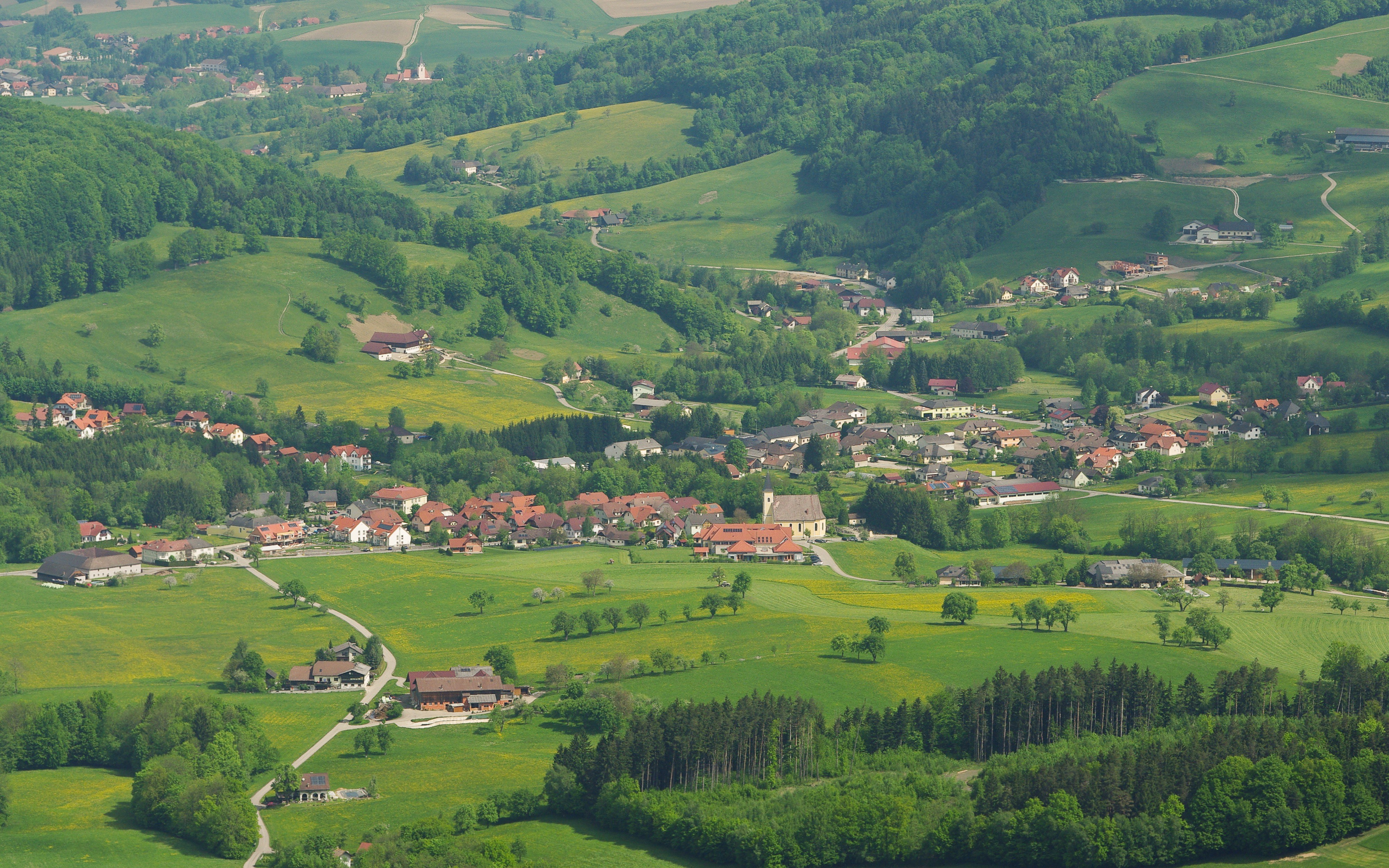
- Texingtal viewed from Walzberg

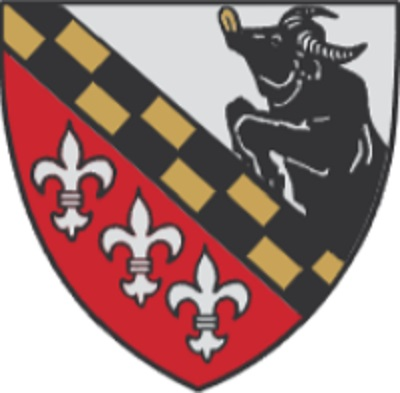
- Coat of arms

- Location within Austria Location within Lower Austria
- Coordinates: 48°3′N 15°19′E
- Country: Austria
- State: Lower Austria
- District: Melk

Government
  - Mayor: Günther Pfeiffer (ÖVP)

Area
  - Total: 32.45 km^{2} (12.53 sq mi)
- Elevation: 370 m (1,210 ft)

Population (2018-01-01)
  - Total: 1,615
  - Density: 49.77/km^{2} (128.9/sq mi)
- Time zone: UTC+1 (CET)
  - Summer (DST): UTC+2 (CEST)
- Postal code: 3242
- Area code: 02755
- Website: www.texingtal.at

Texingtal is a town in the district of Melk in the Austrian state of Lower Austria. It was the birthplace of former Austrian chancellor and fascist dictator Engelbert Dollfuß.

== Population ==
Historical population
Year	Pop.	±%
1971	1,420	—
1981	1,409	−0.8%
1991	1,488	+5.6%
2001	1,538	+3.4%
2011	1,597	+3.8%
2016	1,612	+0.9%
