= Kirnberg an der Mank =

- Municipality
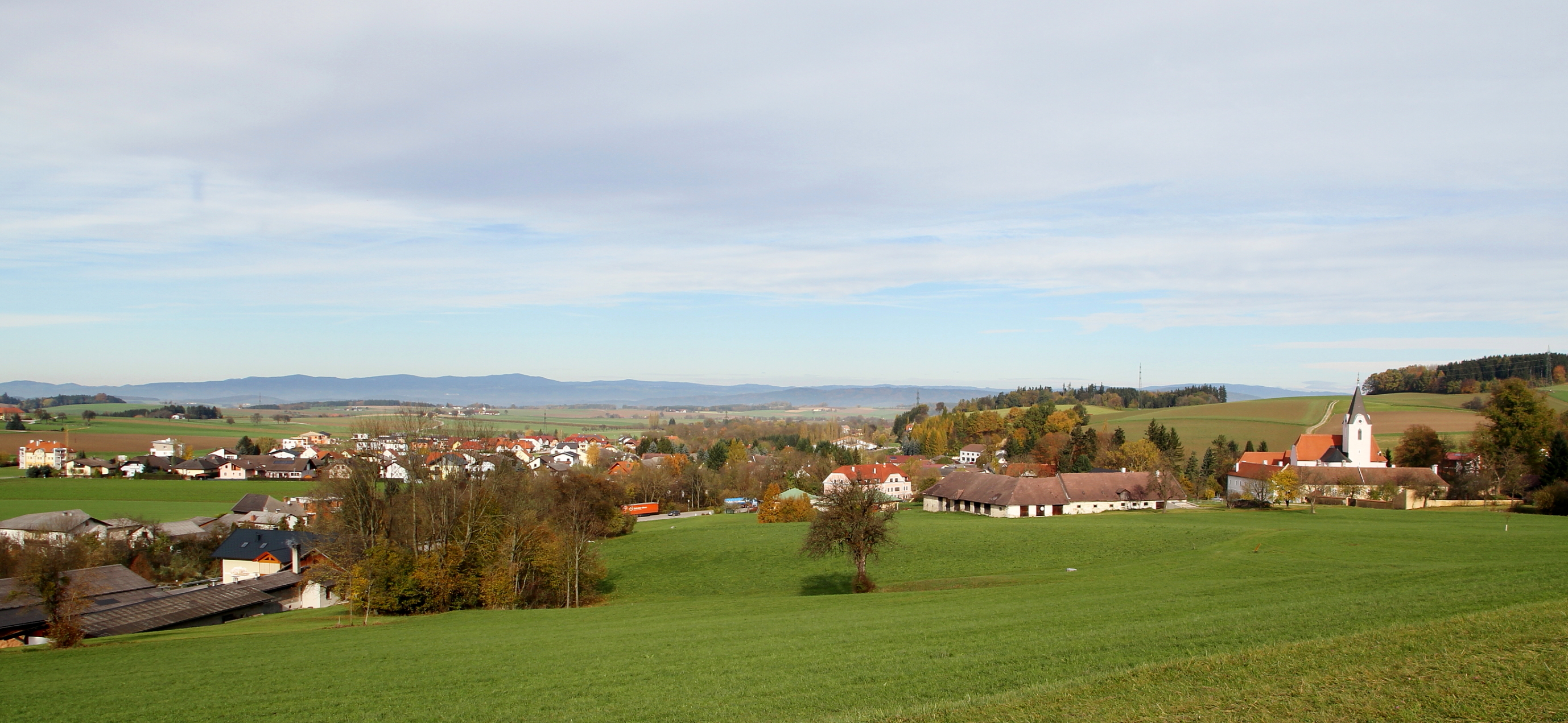
- View from south

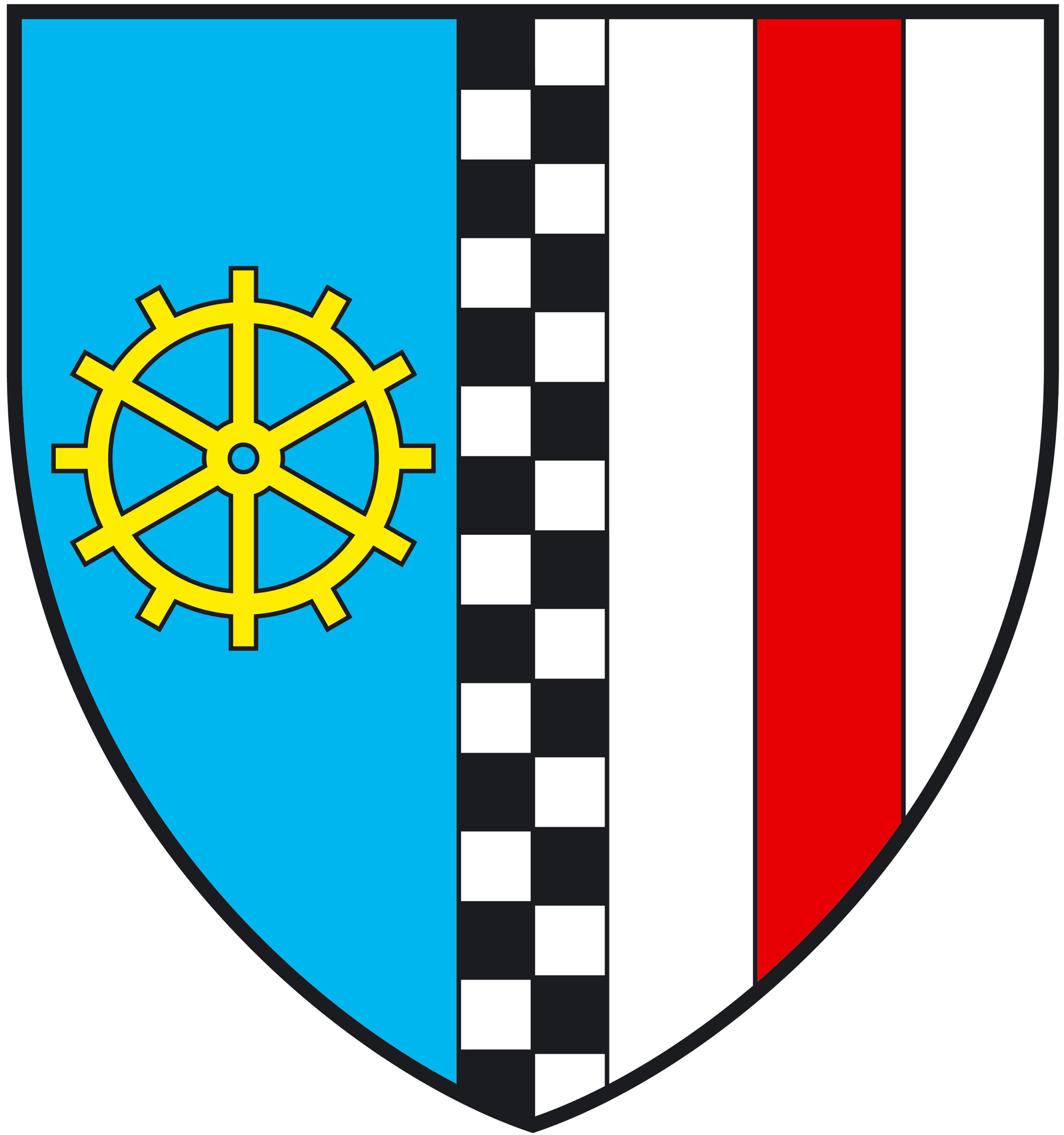
- Coat of arms

- Location within Austria
- Coordinates: 48°4′N 15°19′E
- Country: Austria
- State: Lower Austria
- District: Melk

Government
  - Mayor: Ferdinand Neuhauser

Area
  - Total: 17.67 km^{2} (6.82 sq mi)
- Elevation: 341 m (1,119 ft)

Population (2018-01-01)
  - Total: 1,070
  - Density: 60.6/km^{2} (157/sq mi)
- Time zone: UTC+1 (CET)
  - Summer (DST): UTC+2 (CEST)
- Postal code: 3241
- Area code: 02755
- Website: www.kirnberg.at

Kirnberg an der Mank is a town in the district of Melk in the Austria state of Lower Austria.

== Population ==
Historical population
Year	Pop.	±%
1971	963	—
1981	918	−4.7%
1991	987	+7.5%
2001	1,009	+2.2%
