= Stephan Tauschitz =

Austrian politician (Landbund) and farmer

Stephan Tauschitz (9 July 1889 in Hörtendorf – 28 March 1970 in Klagenfurt) was an Austrian politician (Landbund) and farmer.

Tauschitz was born in Hörtendorf, which was a village, but was later included into Klagenfurt. After high school (Realschule) in Klagenfurt, he studied at Vienna University of Technology, where he graduated in 1922.

He was a member of National Council from 1927 to 1930. Tauschitz was also a State Minister for Foreign Affairs and was awarded the Latvian Order of the Three Stars 1st Class on 31 July 1935. He went on to become Gauleiter of the Heimwehr, but later quit his membership.
