= Renato Camus =

Italian architect

Renato Camus (1891 – 1971) was an Italian architect.

He was born in Pisino, Istria, in 1891. He was among the main figures of the Milanese rationalist architecture between the two world wars. He was particularly interested in the problems of social housing, creating in Milan, with Franco Albini and Giancarlo Palanti, the Fabio Filzi (1935-1938) and Gabriele D'Annunzio districts, now San Siro Milite Ignoto (1938-1941).

He took part in the V (1933), VI (1936) and VII Triennale di Milano (1940).

== See also ==
- Grand Hotel Riccione – Camus designed its 1934 tower annexe
