= Stössing =

- Municipality
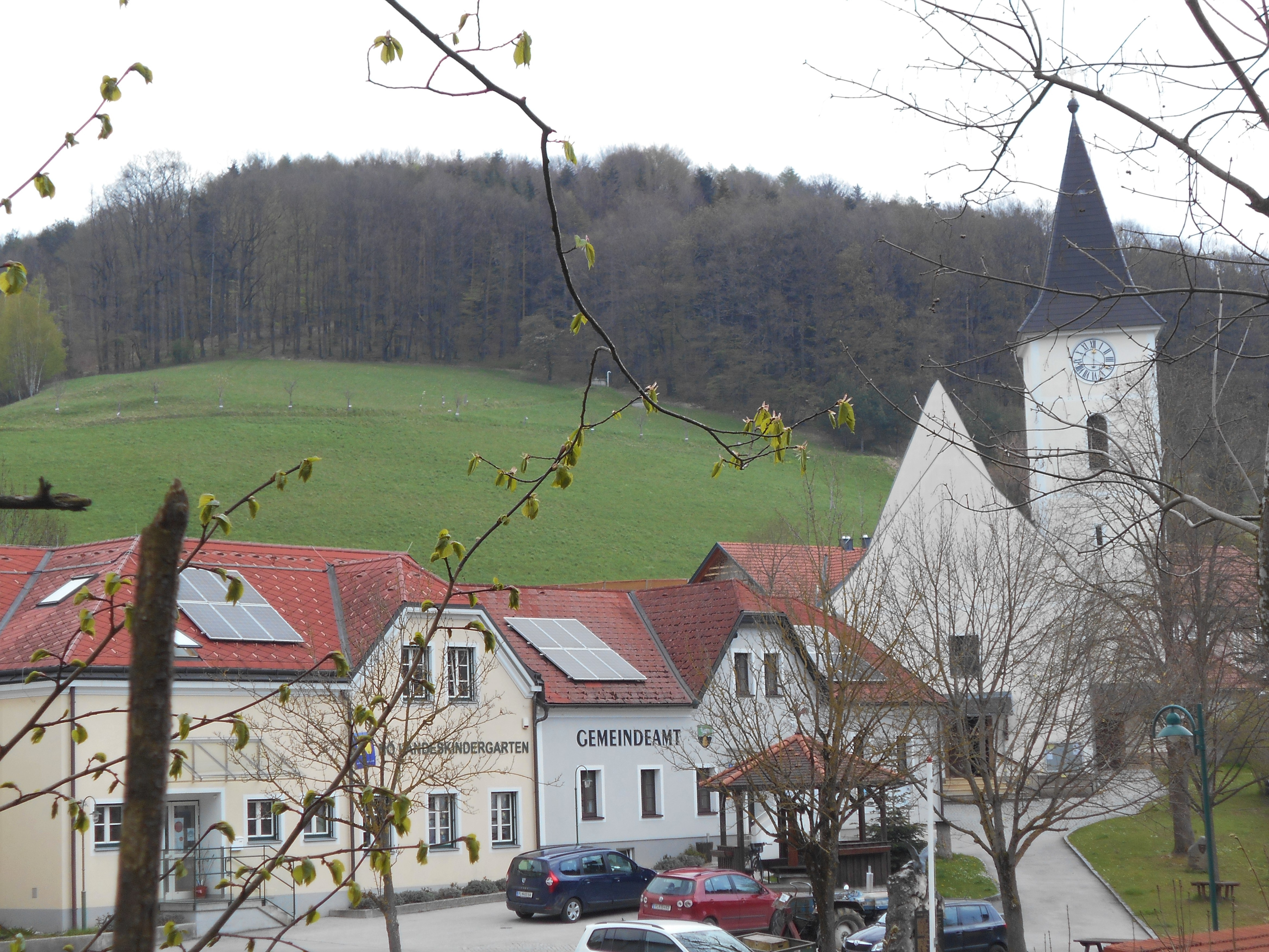
- Stössing town centre

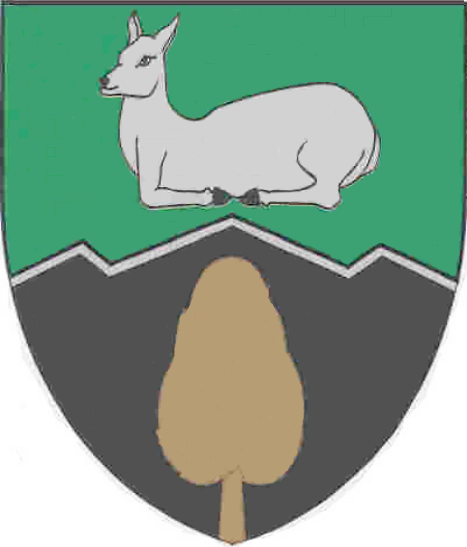
- Coat of arms

- Location within Austria
- Coordinates: 48°07′00″N 15°49′00″E
- Country: Austria
- State: Lower Austria
- District: Sankt Pölten-Land

Government
  - Mayor: Alois Daxböck (ÖVP)

Area
  - Total: 27.48 km^{2} (10.61 sq mi)
- Elevation: 344 m (1,129 ft)

Population (2018-01-01)
  - Total: 838
  - Density: 30.5/km^{2} (79.0/sq mi)
- Time zone: UTC+1 (CET)
  - Summer (DST): UTC+2 (CEST)
- Postal code: 3073
- Area code: 02744
- Vehicle registration: PL
- Website: www.stoessing.gv.at

Stössing is a municipality in the district of Sankt Pölten-Land in the Austrian state of Lower Austria.

== Population ==
Historical population
Year	Pop.	±%
1951	838	—
1961	797	−4.9%
1971	702	−11.9%
1981	670	−4.6%
1991	719	+7.3%
2001	738	+2.6%
2012	768	+4.1%
