= Alwine (Uebigau-Wahrenbrück) =

- Village of Uebigau-Wahrenbrück
- Interactive map of Alwine
- Location within Germany Location within Brandenburg
- Coordinates: 51°35′N 13°26′E
- Country: Germany
- State: Brandenburg
- District: Elbe-Elster
- Town: Uebigau-Wahrenbrück
- Elevation: 85 m (279 ft)

Population (2017)
  - Total: ca. 20
- Time zone: UTC+01:00 (CET)
  - Summer (DST): UTC+02:00 (CEST)
- Vehicle registration: EE
- Website: dorf-alwine.business.site

Alwine is a small settlement in the marshy flat countryside to the east of Leipzig and roughly 120 km (75 miles) south of Berlin. Administratively it is treated as part of the Domsdorf quarter of the rural Uebigau-Wahrenbrück municipality in the state of Brandenburg.

== Overview ==
Alwine is located on the west side of the L65 (local road) and has approximately 20 inhabitants (2017). It comprises five semi-detached houses, one detached family house, one detached double family house, two multi-family houses and several outbuildings, sheds and garages. Its origins date back to the nineteenth century when some of the factory buildings created for the nearby brown-coal mine began, little by little, to be adapted for residential use. The name "Alwine" is thought to have been the name of a wife or daughter of a mine owner/director from the middle part of the nineteenth century.

After the changes which led, in 1990, to German reunification, brown-coal operations in the area quickly came to an end. There being no alternative sources of employment in the area, people drifted away. The entire 1.6 hectare settlement was sold by auction on 9 December 2017 as a single plot for €140,000 - "a settlement with the character of a village" as it is described in the auctioneer's brochure.

After the mine closed two brothers had purchased the site in 2001 and there was talk of investing in the settlement to benefit from its inherent village charms, but since then one of the two brothers has died. Significant investment never materialised and the estimated rental income from the village is thought to have slipped to a little over 50% of the level envisaged in the original purchase contract.
