= 1169 Alwine =

Asteroid

Discovery
- Discovered by: M. F. Wolf; M. Ferrero
- Discovery site: Heidelberg Obs.
- Discovery date: 30 August 1930

Designations
- Named after: unknown
- Alternative designations: 1930 QH · 1937 VH; 1955 SK_{1} · 1955 SR_{1}
- Minor planet category: main-belt · (inner); Flora

Orbital characteristics
- Epoch 4 September 2017 (JD 2458000.5)
- Uncertainty parameter 0
- Observation arc: 86.77 yr (31,691 days)
- Aphelion: 2.6775 AU
- Perihelion: 1.9599 AU
- Semi-major axis: 2.3187 AU
- Eccentricity: 0.1547
- Orbital period (sidereal): 3.53 yr (1,290 days)
- Mean anomaly: 155.85°
- Mean motion: 0° 16^{m} 45.12^{s} / day
- Inclination: 4.0522°
- Longitude of ascending node: 255.08°
- Argument of perihelion: 177.29°

Physical characteristics
- Dimensions: 7.893±0.185 km
- Geometric albedo: 0.179±0.024
- Absolute magnitude (H): 12.8

1169 Alwine, provisional designation 1930 QH, is a Florian asteroid from the inner regions of the asteroid belt, approximately 8 kilometers in diameter. It was discovered on 30 August 1930, by German and Italian astronomers Max Wolf and Mario Ferrero at Heidelberg Observatory in southwest Germany. Any reference of its name to a person is unknown.

== Orbit and classification ==
Alwine is a member of the Flora family (402), a giant asteroid family and the largest family of stony asteroids in the main belt. It orbits the Sun in the inner asteroid belt at a distance of 2.0–2.7 AU once every 3 years and 6 months (1,290 days; semi-major axis of 2.32 AU). Its orbit has an eccentricity of 0.15 and an inclination of 4° with respect to the ecliptic. As no precoveries were taken, and no prior identifications were made, Alwine's observation arc begins with its official discovery observation at Heidelberg in August 1930.

== Physical characteristics ==
According to the survey carried out by NASA's Wide-field Infrared Survey Explorer with its subsequent NEOWISE mission, Alwine measures 7.89 kilometers in diameter, and its surface has an albedo of 0.179. Based on a generic magnitude-to-diameter conversion, its diameter is between 7 and 17 kilometers for an absolute magnitude of 12.8 and an albedo in the range of 0.05 to 0.25.

=== Lightcurve ===
As of 2017, no rotational lightcurves have been obtained. The body's rotation period, pole and shape remain unknown.

== Naming ==
This minor planet is named after a common German female name. Any reference of this name to a person or occurrence is unknown.

=== Unknown meaning ===
Among the many thousands of named minor planets, Alwine is one of 120 asteroids, for which no official naming citation has been published. All of these low-numbered asteroids have numbers between 164 Eva and 1514 Ricouxa and were discovered between 1876 and the 1930s, predominantly by astronomers Auguste Charlois, Johann Palisa, Max Wolf and Karl Reinmuth.
