= Capital punishment in Austria =

Europe holds the greatest concentration of abolitionist states (blue). Map current as of 2022 Abolished for all offences Abolished in practice Retains capital punishment

Capital punishment in Austria was abolished in 1787, although restored in 1795. Unlike other countries with a minimum age of 18, the Habsburg Law enacted in 1919 set the minimum age for execution in Austria at 20.

The method of execution in Austria was hanging until the annexation by Nazi Germany (1938-1945) when it was replaced by the guillotine. After World War II, hanging was re-introduced by the British. The last person to be executed in Austria was Johann Trnka. He was hanged on 24 March 1950 for the crime of murder. Capital punishment was abolished for murder on 30 June 1950. However, executions continued into the 1950s under Allied military law in the Soviet occupation zone, with the last executions taking place no later than 1955, when the occupation ended. Capital punishment was abolished completely in February 1968. Austria is a state party to the Second Optional Protocol to ICCPR (ratified 1993), Protocol No. 6 to ECHR (1984), and Protocol No. 13 to ECHR (2004).
