= San Fortunato =

San Fortunado may refer to:

- San Fortunato, Rimini, a parish and church in Emilia-Romagna, Italy
- San Fortunato, Todi, a church in Umbria, Italy

== See also ==
- Saint Fortunatus (disambiguation)
