= San Martino, Riccione =

Church in Riccione, Italy

San Martino
- Old Church of San Martino in Arcione
- Chiesa vecchia di San Martino d'Arcione
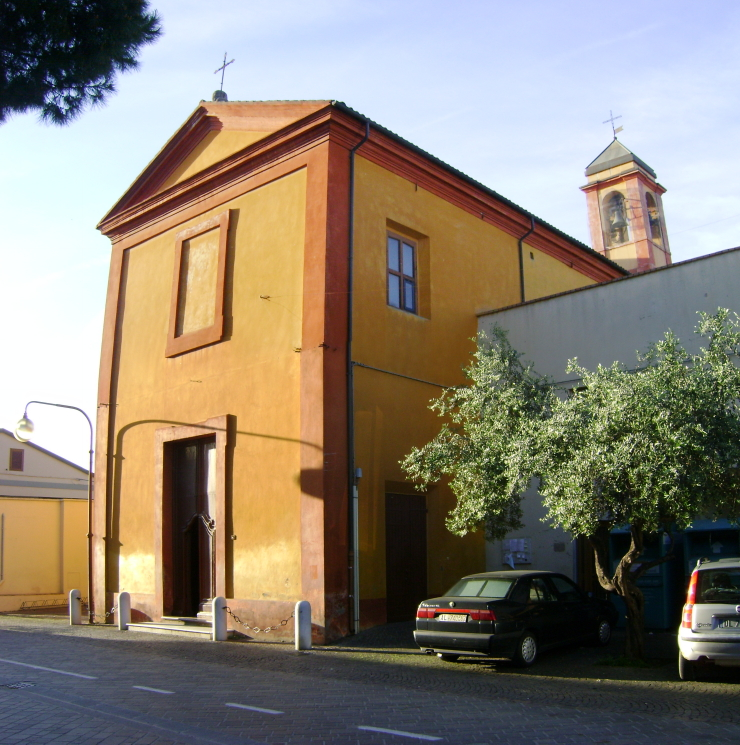
- The old church in May 2010
- San Martino
- 43°59′39.54″N 12°39′18.47″E
- Location: Riccione, Emilia-Romagna
- Address: Corso Fratelli Cervi 235
- Country: Italy
- Language: Italian
- Denomination: Roman Catholic
- Religious order: Olivetan (1789-97)
- Website: sanmartinoriccione.it

History
- Status: Church
- Dedication: St Martin of Tours
- Consecrated: 8 November 1789

Architecture
- Functional status: Active
- Architect: Sante Mazzotti
- Years built: 1787-89
- Groundbreaking: 10 November 1787

Administration
- Archdiocese: Ravenna-Cervia
- Diocese: Rimini
- Deanery: Litorale Sud
- Parish: San Martino

The Old Church of San Martino in Arcione (Italian: Chiesa vecchia di San Martino in Arcione), known more simply as San Martino, is a Roman Catholic church in Riccione, in Emilia-Romagna, northern Italy.

First recorded in January 1177 as S. Martini in Arzonis, the first, medieval church was located in the area of the present-day Fontanelle, south of Riccione. After the church was destroyed by an earthquake on Christmas Day 1786, San Martino was rebuilt at its present location on Corso Fratelli Cervi; the church was consecrated on 8 November 1789. It includes the shrine of Blessed Alessio Monaldi, who has been venerated in Riccione since 1578.

To accommodate Riccione's growing population, a New Church of San Martino (Italian: Chiesa nuova di San Martino) was consecrated on 10 March 1963. Located on Viale Diaz, which runs between the old town and the railway station, the larger, modern church is less than 280 metres (310 yards) away from the old church as the crow flies.

Both churches are dedicated to St Martin of Tours. Together with the churches of San Francesco (in Fontanelle, consecrated 1982) and Santa Caterina (in Raibano, consecrated 1988), they constitute Riccione's parish of San Martino.

== History ==
The first mention of S. Martini in Arzonis dates to January 1177. A deed of sale, dated 20 April 1217, records San Martino as a chapel within the parish of San Lorenzo in Strada. It was located in the area of the present-day Fontanelle, south of Riccione along an eponymous stream, on a hill known as Cavrèt d'arvura. The medieval church contained one nave and three altars, dedicated to San Martino in Arcione, the Rosary, and Blessed Alessio Monaldi.

On Christmas Day 1786, an earthquake destroyed the medieval church. Work to rebuild the church began on 10 November 1787, under the direction of Sante Mazzotti, with donations from Michelangelo Almeri and the Mattioli family. The new church was built on Corso Fratelli Cervi, within the growing town to the north of the original site, along the ancient Via Flaminia. Almeri had donated the necessary land to the Olivetans at the Scolca Abbey, who administered the parish.

The new church was consecrated on 8 November 1789. In 1827, the church was equipped with a baptismal font; in 1855, a cemetery was added to its left side. In the following decades, the sacristy was built, the belltower restored, the interior painted, and the altarpiece installed. The chapel of San Giuseppe was added on the site of the old cemetery in 1877.

The church was restored in 1989. The restoration included raising the anchoring of the bells in the belltower.

== Features ==
The church's belltower is located in the corner between the presbytery and the main altar. It is 19 metres (62 feet) high, and houses three bells.

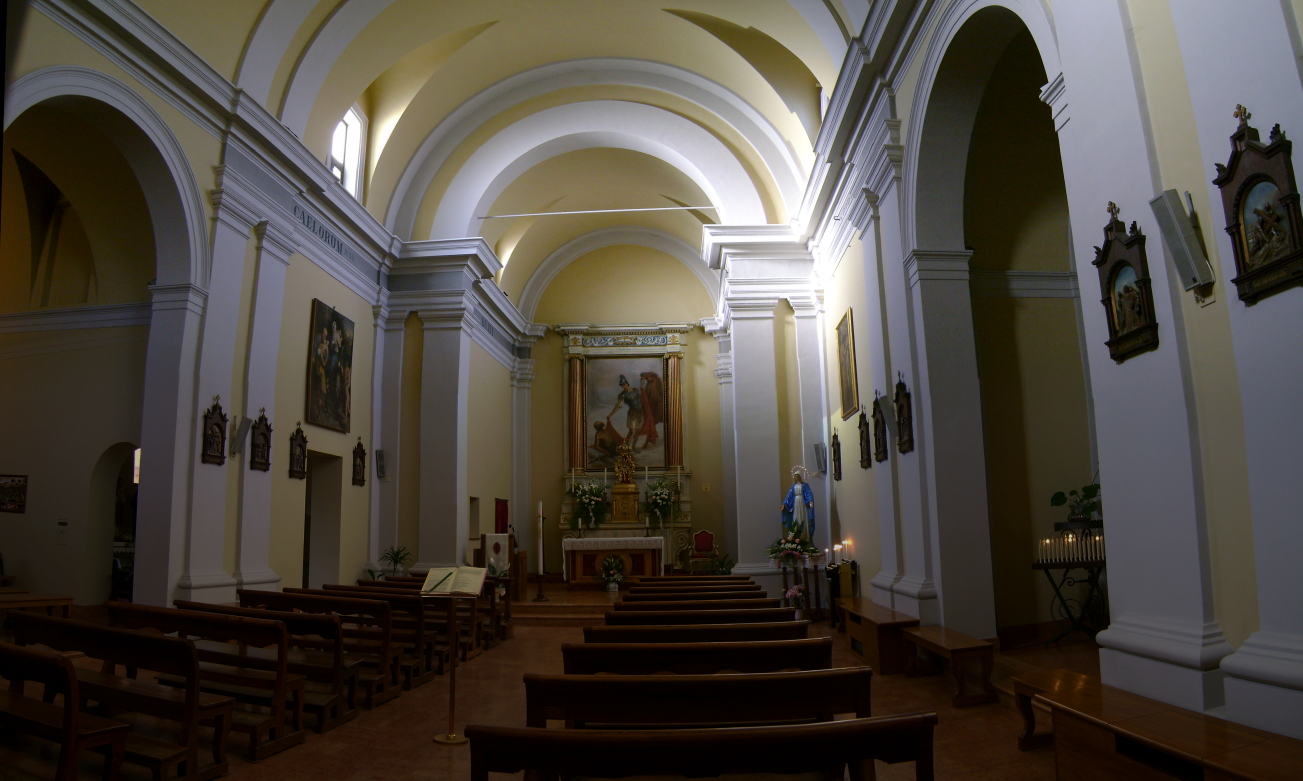
The interior of the old church in May 2010

The late-18th-century altarpiece in the chapel dedicated to Blessed Alessio Monaldi records the legend that he found water for pilgrims. Two thirsty pilgrims are depicted on the left, while on the right, Monaldi makes the ox goad to make the spring flow, accompanied by two angels. The painter is unknown, but may have been the work of Ligorio Donati, a former apprentice of Giovan Battista Costa, Agostino Masucci, and Tommaso Conca, who was active in the rural areas of Rimini.

== Blessed Alessio Monaldi ==
The church contains the shrine of Blessed Alessio Monaldi, who has been venerated in a marble tomb since 1578. The medieval church also included a chapel dedicated to him.

Monaldi was born in 1473. According to legend, he was a poor and virtuous farmer, who was mocked for his religious observance and humility. Several legends have been attributed to him:

- Striking the ground after goading his ox, Monaldi created a water source for thirsty pilgrims by the Via Flaminia.
- Monaldi's cattle damaged a field of a scorning neighbour while he was at Mass, for which he was abused. The field was immediately restored.
- Monaldi abandoned a cart in the Torrente Marano at the sound of church bells; the river flooded but left the cart untouched, while other carts were swept into the Adriatic Sea.
- He planted trees that immediately bore ripe fruit, which he gave to some beggars.

Monaldi died aged thirty on 2 May 1503 and was forgotten. Some years after his death, Monaldi's body was exhumed and found in an incorrupt state, beginning his veneration.

From at least the end of the 16th century, locals venerated Monaldi as a Blessed. Despite his cult's local persistence, the Catholic Church has never officially recognised it. A canonisation process was opened in 1838, but was unsuccessful, and closed in 1842 without reaching Vatican officials.

Monaldi's veneration was particularly strong among Riccione's fishermen, who dedicated an extra holiday to his feast. According to one legend, during his life, Monaldi shined lights onto the belltower of San Martino to save fishermen from shipwreck. In 1880, an algal bloom between Ravenna and Ancona was said to have cleared after a procession of sailors invoked his intercession. Sailors have attributed sudden calms in perilous storms to Monaldi.

A votive cell to Monaldi exists next to the church of Stella Maris, along the Via Flaminia, east of Fontanelle; the cell records the spot that Monaldi found the water source, and predates the church's construction in 1963. Riccione's sulphurous water is locally renowned for its minerality and strong odour, with the flavour of rotten eggs.

The cult of Monaldi intertwines with that of other saints named Alexis, and the legend of the water source bears resemblance to that of St Isidore the Farmer. Historical records remember numerous local landowners carrying his surname, but nobody bearing the name Alessio. His ownership of oxen and a cart suggests that Monaldi was a farmer of some means.

== New church ==
San Martino
- New Church of San Martino in Arcione
- Chiesa nuova di San Martino d'Arcione
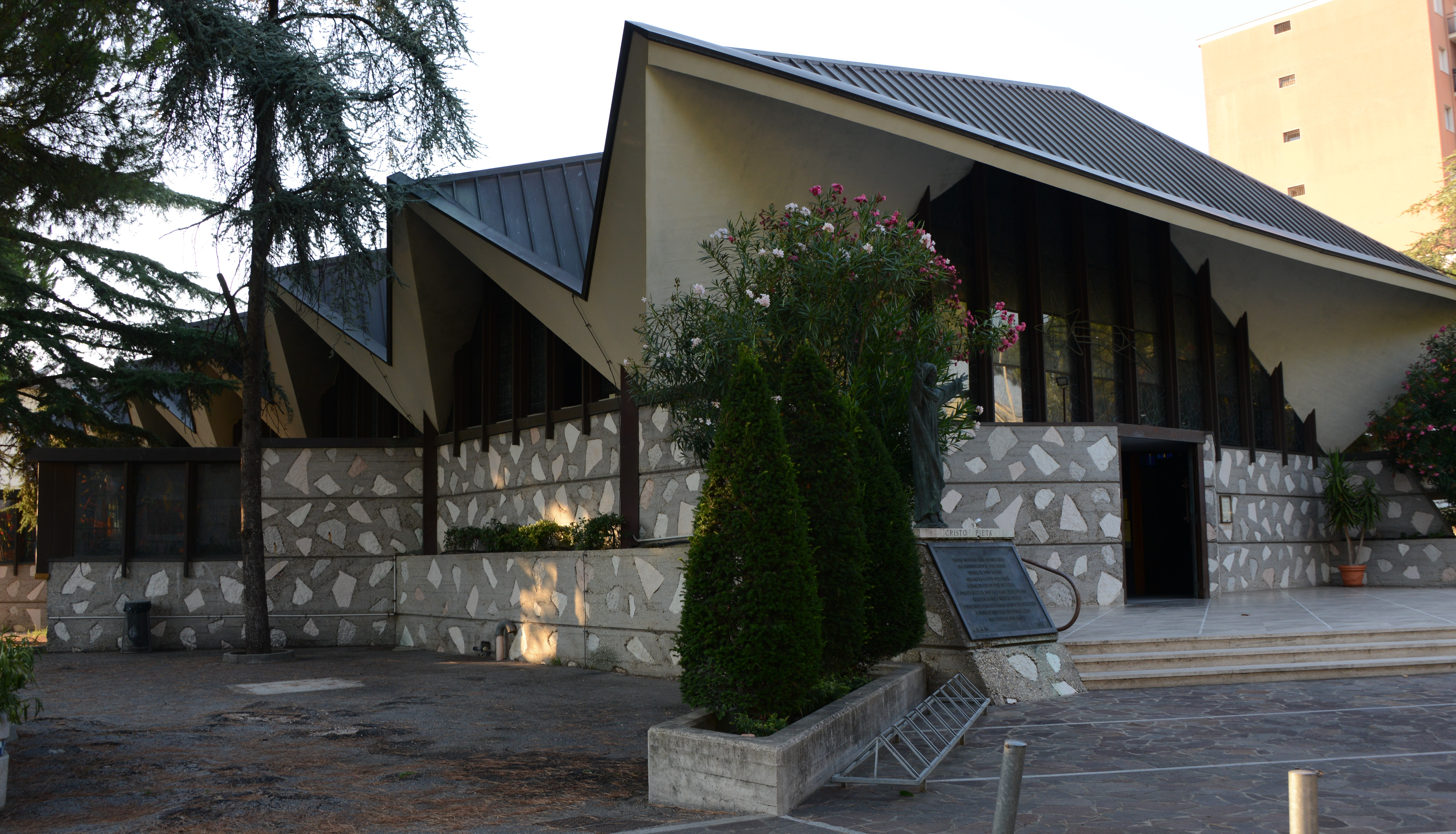
- The new church in August 2015
- San Martino
- 43°59′48.68″N 12°39′17.87″E
- Location: Riccione, Emilia-Romagna
- Address: Viale Minghetti 11
- Country: Italy
- Language: Italian
- Denomination: Roman Catholic
- Website: sanmartinoriccione.it

History
- Status: Church
- Founder: Don Alfredo Montebelli
- Dedication: St Martin of Tours
- Consecrated: 10 April 1963

Architecture
- Functional status: Active
- Architect: Marco Bizzi
- Years built: 1962-63
- Groundbreaking: 20 January 1962

Administration
- Archdiocese: Ravenna-Cervia
- Diocese: Rimini
- Deanery: Litorale Sud
- Parish: San Martino

By the mid-19th century, the church on Corso Fratelli Cervi was too small for Riccione's population. Don Alfredo Montebelli, San Martino's parish priest from 1937 to 1966, desired that a new place of worship be built. Benito Mussolini, Italy's dictator, whose family owned a summer villa in Riccione, promised to support its construction, but plans were shelved by the outbreak of the Second World War.

In January 1945, the parish was bequeathed a plot of agricultural land between Viale Ceccarini and Viale Diaz belonging to Maria Trozzolini. Her late brother, Dr Oddo Trozzolini, had wanted to donate the land for the construction of the new church. Maria's testament specified that the parish could only accept the land within twenty years of her death if the church's construction was financially viable. The first stone of the new church was placed on 20 January 1962.

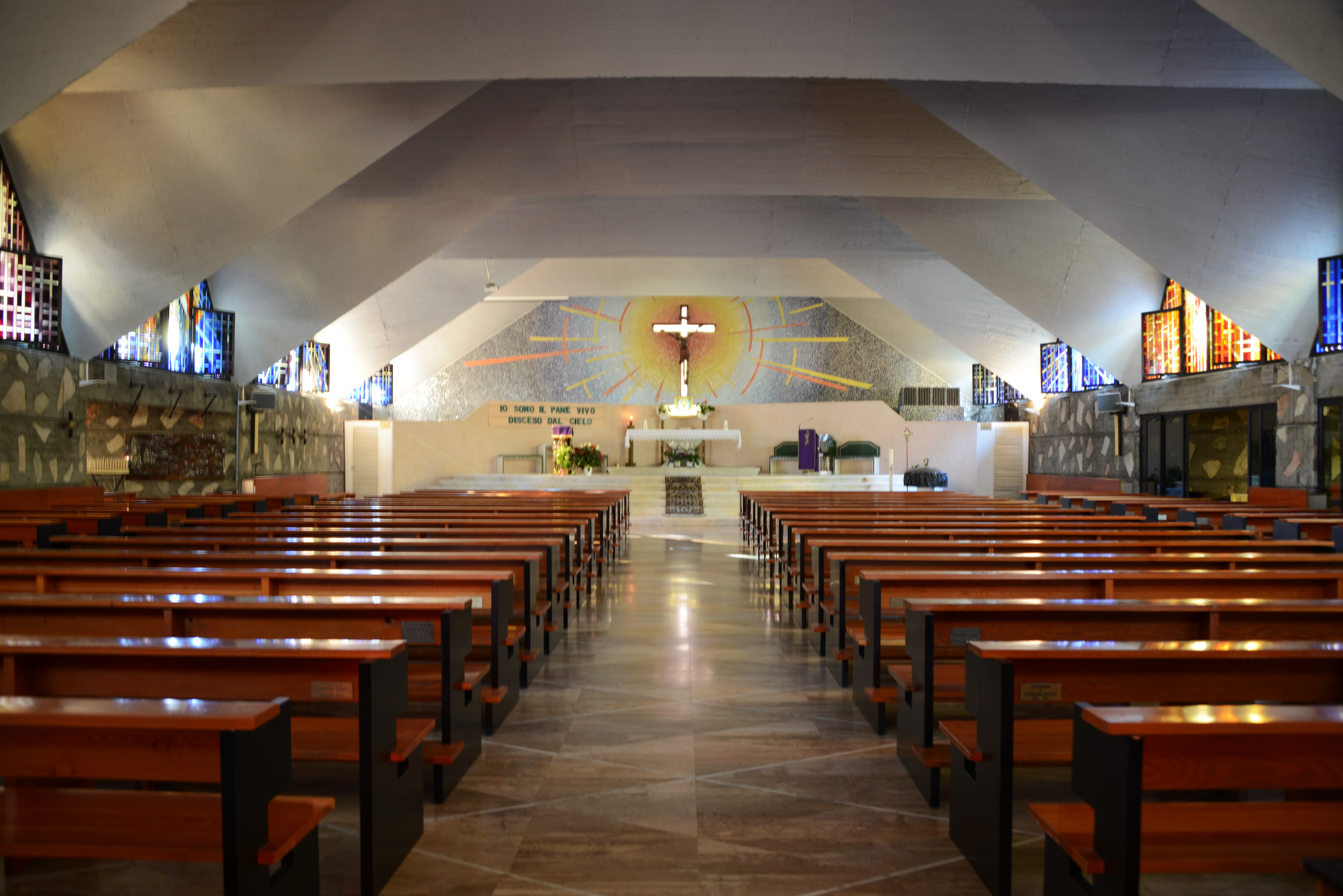
The interior of the new church in August 2015

The new church was designed by Marco Bizzi and built by the Impresa Edile Mingucci Giuseppe. It was consecrated on 10 March 1963, still dedicated to St Martin of Tours.

In its architecture, the church was conceived as a 'tent church'. It features twelve stained glass windows, created between 1986 and 1992, which illustrate the seven sacraments, the birth of the Church, and Christ's incarnation, passion, death and resurrection. The current presbytery was added between 1999 and 2000.
