= Riccione =

- Comune
- Comune di Riccione
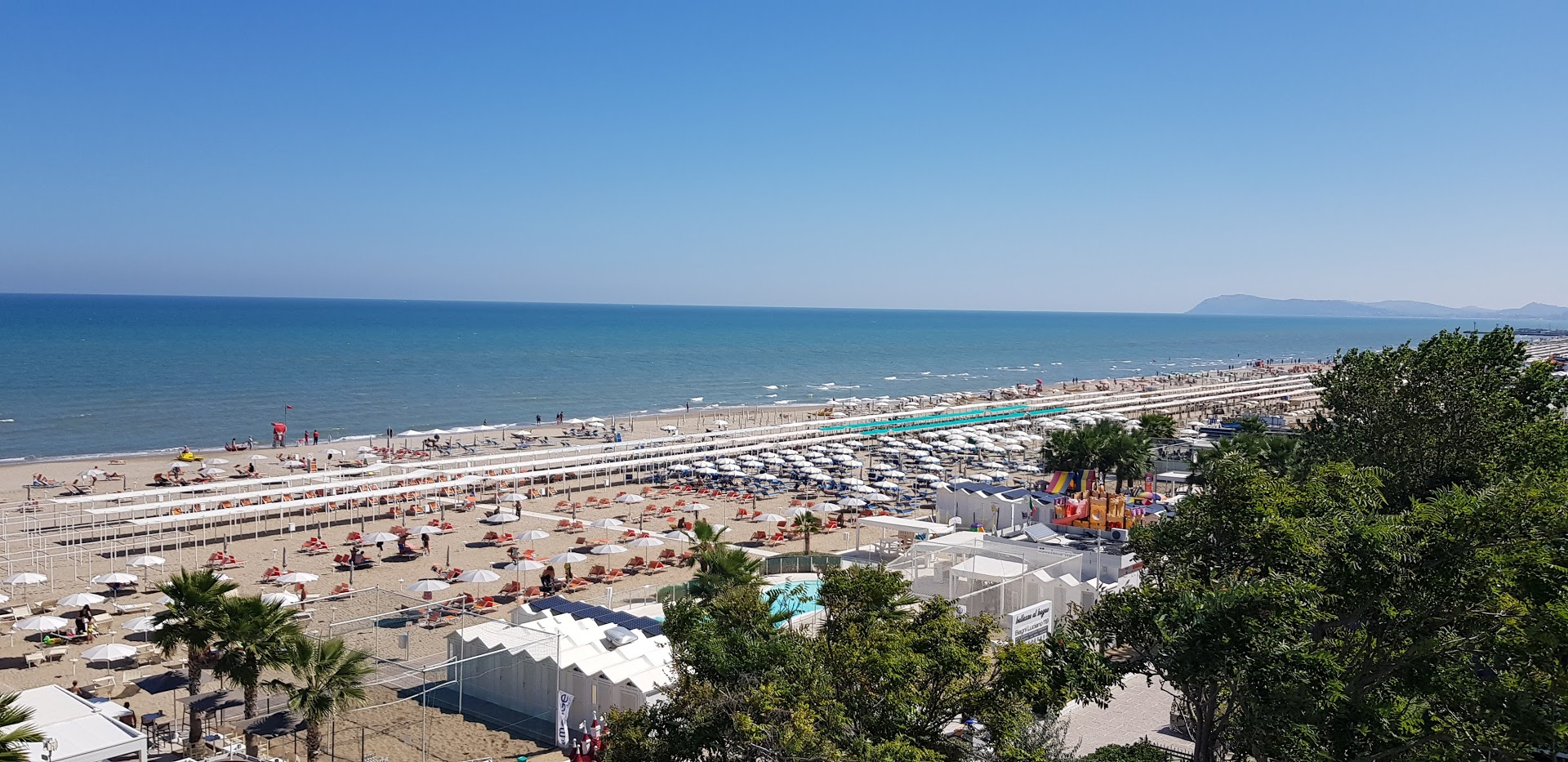
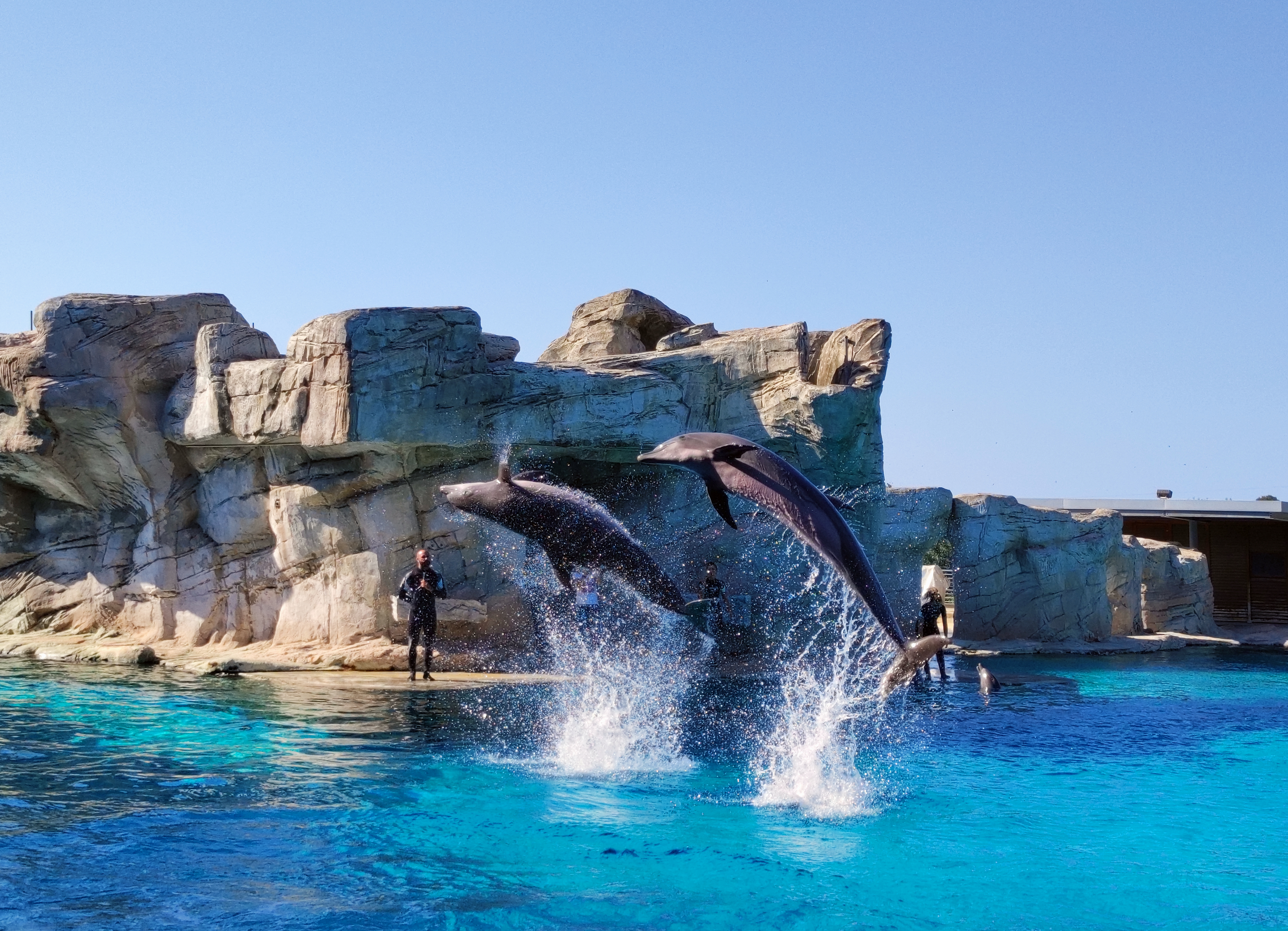
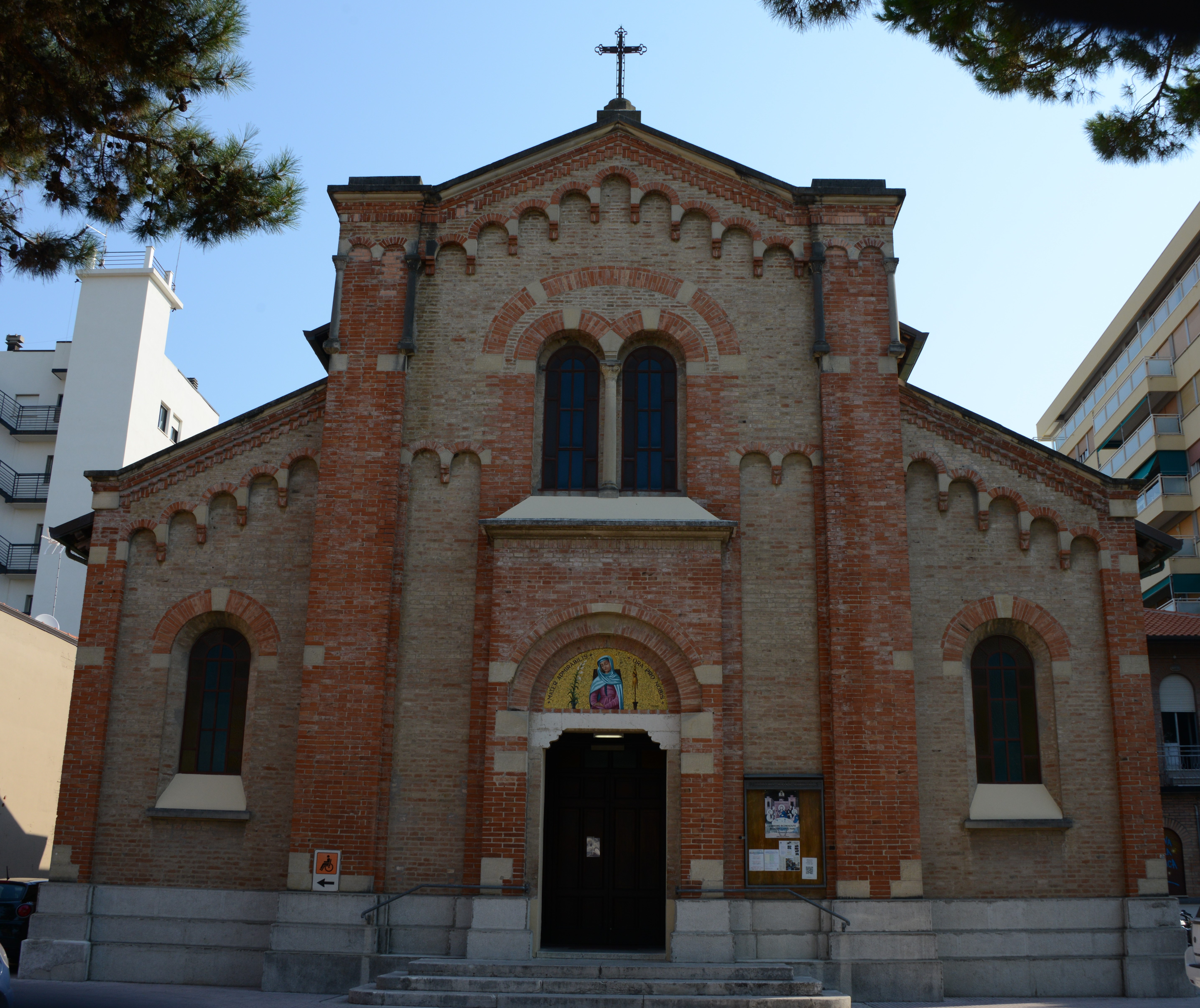
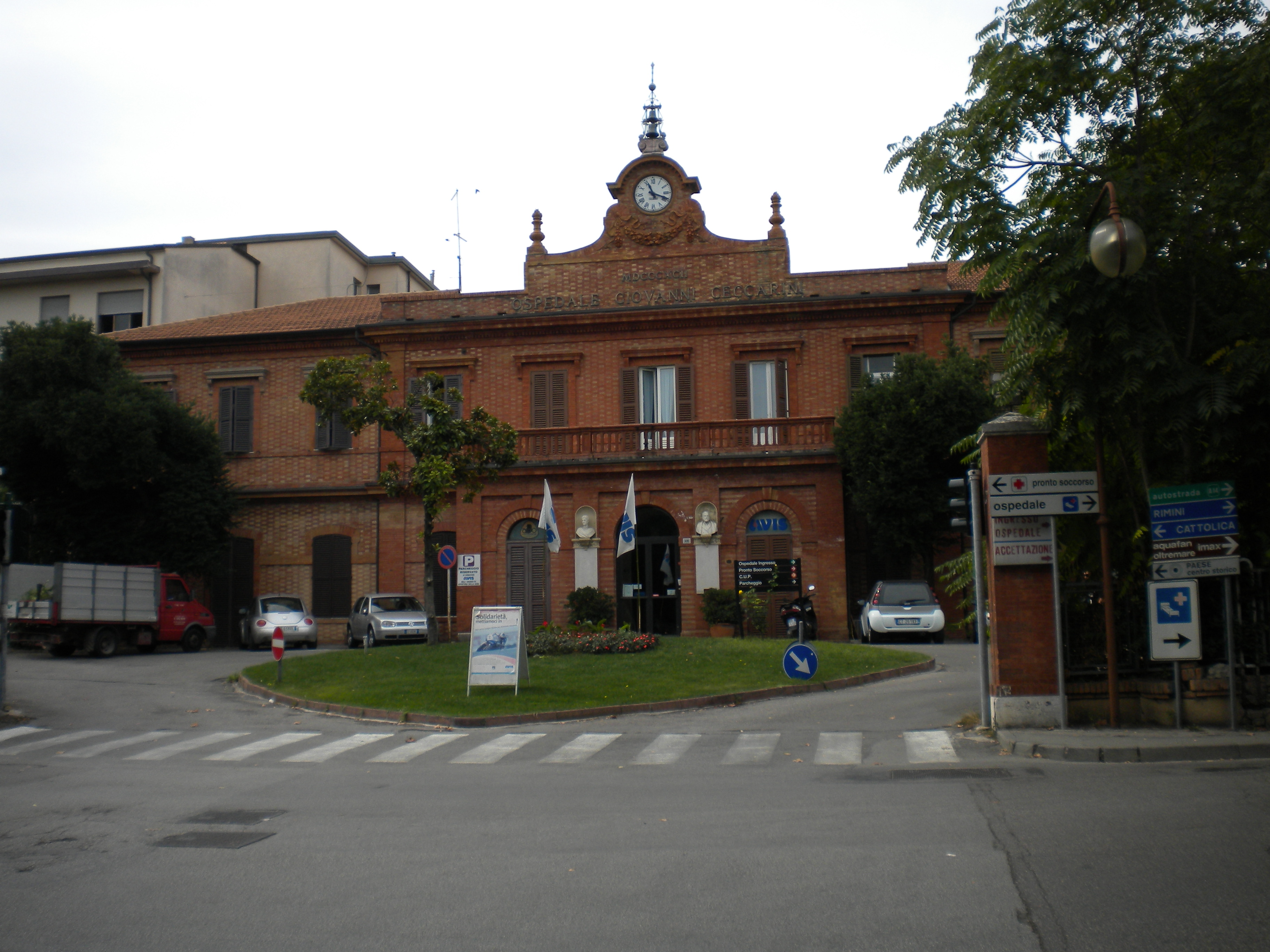
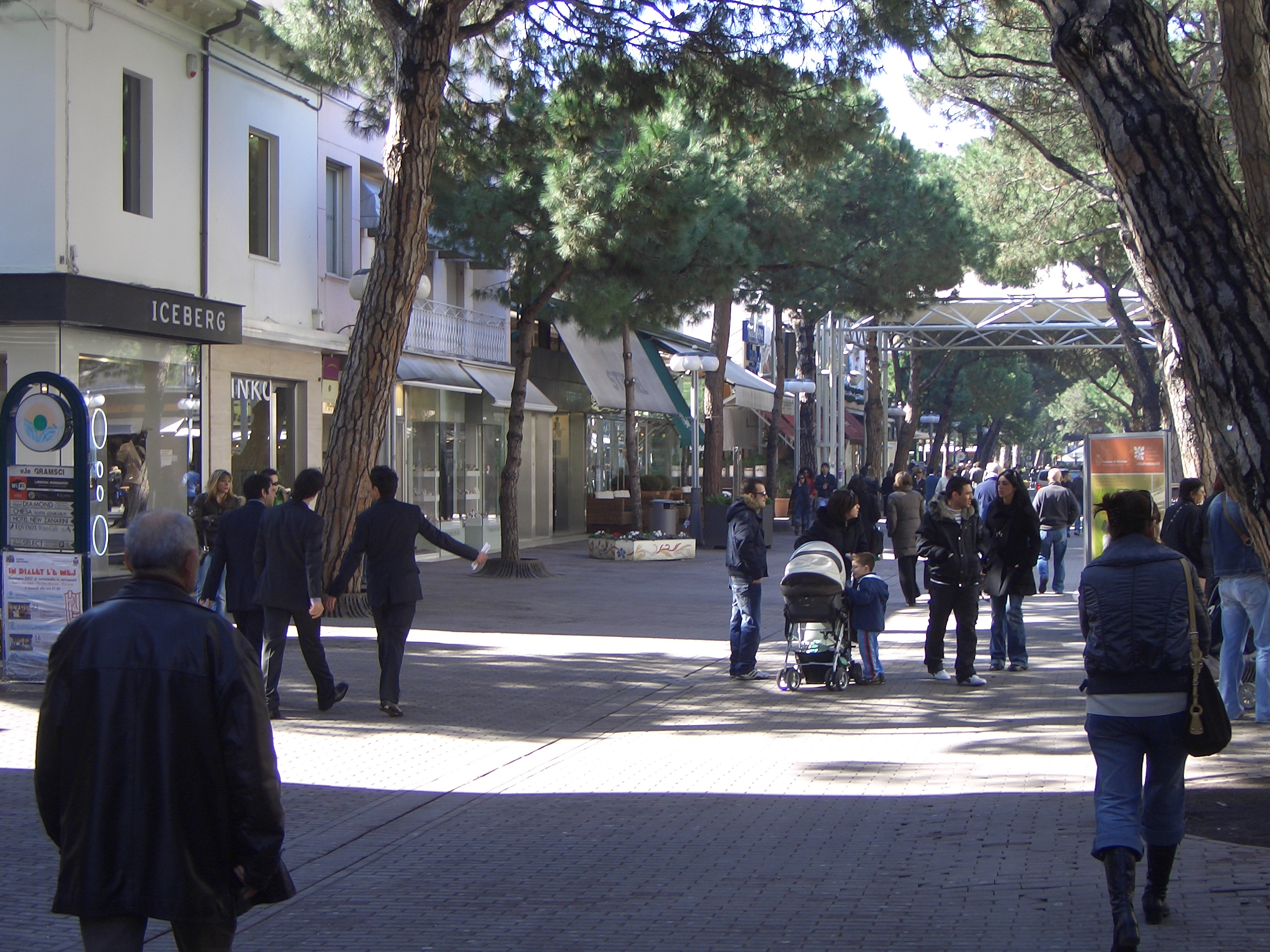
- Clockwise from top: Riccione's beach, the Church of Mater Admirabilis, Viale Ceccarini, Ceccarini Hospital, and Oltremare's dolphinarium

- Flag Coat of arms
- Nickname: La Perla Verde ("The Green Pearl")
- Location within Italy Location within Emilia-Romagna
- Coordinates: 44°0′N 12°39′E
- Country: Italy
- Region: Emilia-Romagna
- Province: Rimini

Government
  - Mayor: Daniela Angelini (PD)

Area
  - Total: 17.5 km^{2} (6.8 sq mi)
- Elevation: 15.2 m (50 ft)
- Highest elevation: 75 m (246 ft)
- Lowest elevation: 0 m (0 ft)

Population (1 January 2023)
  - Total: 34,514
  - Density: 1,970/km^{2} (5,110/sq mi)
- Demonym: Riccionese(i)
- Time zone: UTC+1 (CET)
  - Summer (DST): UTC+2 (CEST)
- Postal code: 47838
- Dialing code: 0541
- ISTAT code: 099013
- Patron saint: San Martino
- Saint day: 11 November
- Website: Official website

Riccione (Italian: [ritˈtʃoːne]; Romagnol: Arciôn [arˈtsoːŋ]) is a comune (municipality) in the Province of Rimini, Emilia-Romagna, northern Italy.

Riccione is centred on the Rio Melo, a minor river that flows into the Adriatic Sea. In the decades following the construction of the Bologna–Ancona railway in 1861, Riccione grew substantially with the development of tourism and the construction of elegant villas in the Liberty Style. It became independent from the municipality of Rimini in 1922, and was further popularised after the Mussolini family bought a seaside villa for its summer holidays. As of 2023, Riccione had an estimated population of 34,514.

Riccione's economy is dependent on tourism, especially catering to young people and families.

== Name ==
Riccione's name is of uncertain origin. It first appears as Arcioni in the Bavarian Code, a register of investitures of the church in Ravenna in 810–816 AD. Several hypotheses have been advanced for its etymology:

- A botanical explanation is offered by the plant Arctium, which would have grown along the banks of the Fontanelle, a minor stream in Riccione's south.
- From architecture, the name could refer to a fortress from the Latin arcis (stronghold, especially on a hill), or the arches of a Roman aqueduct.
- It may refer to a saddlebow (Italian: arcione), describing the depression of the land between the Rio Melo and the Fontanelle, a resting point for pilgrims on horseback, or referring to the legend of St Martin of Tours, Riccione's patron, dismounting his horse to share his cloak with a pilgrim.
- It may refer to a Roman "Arcioni" family.

Since its modern development, Riccione has been nicknamed la Perla Verde (the Green Pearl), a reflection of its greenery and affluent villas.

== History ==
=== Early history ===
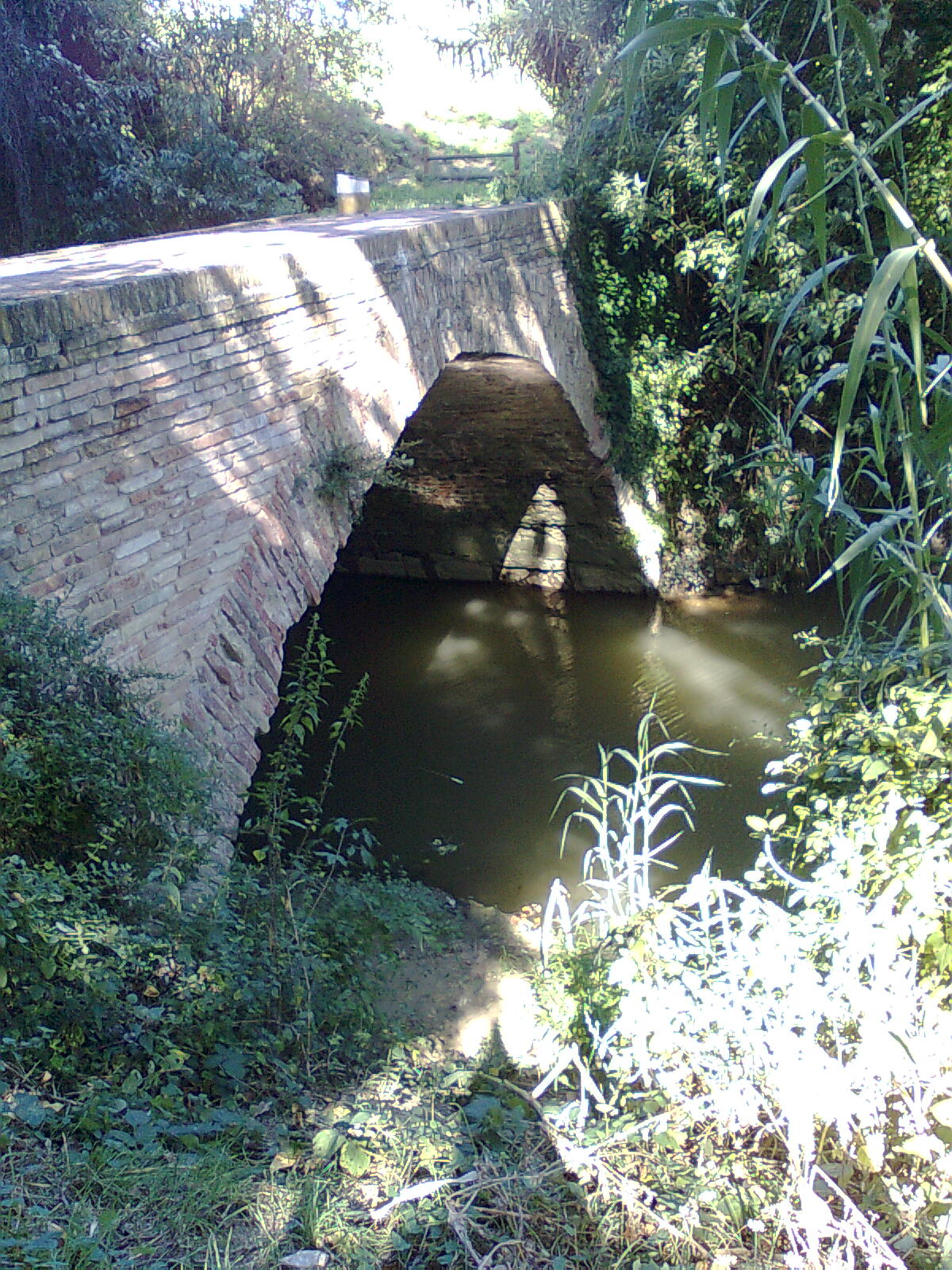
The Roman bridge across the Rio Melo, August 2010

Riccione's oldest archaeological remains were found in the Villaggio Papini area, and date to 5,000 BC and the Bronze Age.

Following the Roman victory at the Battle of Sentinum in 295 BC, the region became important for the Roman's expansion against the Celts, leading to the foundation of the colonia of Ariminum (modern Rimini) in 268 BC and the construction of the Via Flaminia, running from Rome to Ariminum. A Roman settlement in Riccione, officially a vicus, was centred in the area of the present-day San Lorenzo in Strada, where the Via Flaminia turned to a more northerly bearing. Excavations near the present-day pharmacy revealed a necropolis and several buildings, dating to the second century BC. A single-arched Roman bridge over the Rio Melo survives next to the SS16 state road. The bridge was restored in the 17th century and used until the 1930s. The Via Flaminia in Riccione was on a climb, requiring additional animals to help transport loaded carts; from ancient times until the arrival of the railway, helping goods cross the area was a profitable local business.

In later centuries, San Lorenzo in Strada was likely depopulated from swamping and incursions during the Gothic Wars. Land grants are recorded in the "Arcioni area" in the Bavarian Code in 810-816 AD, while the churches of San Lorenzo in Strada and San Martino in Arcione are first recorded in documents dated to 997 and 1177. The latter church was located on Cavrèt d'Arvura, a hill in the area of the present-day Fontanelle, south of Riccione along an eponymous stream.

In 1260, the area was settled by the Florentine Agolanti family, who were linked to the Malatesta lords of Rimini. The family built a castle on the hills in Riccione's outskirts. A 1371 census records two residential areas, numbering 150 residents. In the 16th century, the main hamlet was known as Le Casette, named after a stream running parallel to the Via Flaminia.

In 1673, after decades of local campaigns, the Papal States approved the building of watchtowers by the Torrente Marano and the Fontanelle to defend from Saracen and Usok pirate raids. On 8 January 1889, Riccione became the site of the shipwrecking of the Dutch Zeepaard sailing ship, which ran aground as it sailed from Venice to Ancona.

The beach was expanded between the 16th and 19th centuries, during which time it was used for rice paddies. Riccione's population numbered 850 at the end of 1700, centred around San Martino.

=== Post-unification ===
At the time of Italy's unification in 1861, Riccione numbered 1,800 residents. It was a poor area, reliant on subsistence agriculture and, to a lesser extent, fishing. Italy's unification accelerated the construction of the Bologna–Ancona railway, whose section between Rimini and Ancona was inaugurated on 17 November 1861, though Riccione would only have a permanent stop from 1865. The town grew in popularity soon afterwards: affluent Bolognese families constructed elegant residences, which functioned as second homes by the sea.

During the same period, Don Carlo Tonini, the parish priest of San Martino, proposed that the seaside could cure children living in the Po Valley of scrofula. He organised summer holidays for afflicted children, who stayed with host families in Riccione; Tonini would collect them each morning, with farmers providing transport aboard their ox-drawn carts from the town to the seaside along Viale Viola. The holidays were helped by supporting committees in cities across Emilia-Romagna; Riccione's treatments were cheaper than regional alternatives. In 1867, Tonini accommodated 106 children with the help of the Bolognese committee.

At the start of 1872, Riccione numbered 111 families in 76 buildings; a further 213 families in 174 houses were scattered in its countryside. Its total population was 1,940. At this time, Count Giacinto Martinelli, from Santa Colomba, bought nine hectares (22 acres) of Riccione's seaside, north of the railway between Viale Viola and the present-day Viale Cesare Battisti, which he developed with wide avenues and tree-lined roads, selling plots of land for the construction of villas. In 1877, in partnership with Emilio Amati, Martinelli established Riccione's first marine hospice, which was the second in Romagna for the treatment of scrofulus children after the Matteucci hospice in Rimini. Three other marine hospices followed before the turn of the century, as well as a short-lived hydrotherapy establishment.

=== Late 19th-century development ===
The first villas were built along Viale Viola in 1884. By 1885, there were up to 12 villas owned by foreign residents. In 1889, a mutual aid company for sailors was founded. Riccione's beaches were developed into bathing resorts with lifeguards following the first state concessions in 1895.

Particularly important to Riccione's development in the late 19th century was the American Maria Boorman Weeler. Her husband, Giovanni Ceccarini, was a doctor from Cantiano; he fought for the Roman Republic, whose fall led him to exile in New York, where he met and married Maria. On their return to Italy, the Ceccarinis bought several properties in Riccione and Scacciano, a village in Misano Adriatico by Riccione's border. Following Giovvani's death in Scacciano in 1888, Maria began a proliferous philanthropic relationship with the area, beginning with a 200 lire donation for its civic library. She donated further funds for an annual winter soup kitchen from 1890, and the construction of a kindergarten (1891), the city's hospital (1892-93), whose generator powered streetlights along Via Flaminia and Viale Viola, and Riccione's port (1901). Maria died on 31 August 1903, leaving a further 650,000 lire in her will for the hospital and a garden. On 11 October 1911, Rimini's municipal council renamed Viale Viola to Viale Maria Ceccarini.

=== Early 20th century ===
In 1901, Sebastiano Amati inaugurated the city's first hotel in Viale Viola. In 1910, the Teatro Sghedoni was inaugurated; the theatre was later renamed the Kursaal and the Teatro Dante.

In 1905, Amati, Ausonio Franzoni, and Felice Pullè established a society to obtain more services from the municipality of Rimini. In 1910, they presented a petition, signed by the majority of Riccione's residents, for the frazione's independence from the municipality.

The outbreak of the First World War suspended the independence campaign. Sixty-one names are recorded in the war memorial in Riccione's cemetery. The war caused significant hardship in Riccione: its tourist industry collapsed; an agricultural crisis caused severe inflation and the rationing of flour and bread; and about seventy fishing families were hurt by a regulation that prohibited fishing beyond 500 metres (1/4 nautical mile) from the coast. Additionally, because of the strategic importance of the railway, the town was bombed from the sea and sky by the Austrian-Hungarian army, and crossed by many Venetian refugees.

The 1916 Rimini earthquakes razed about 80% of Riccione's buildings. The 16 August earthquake destroyed the church of San Lorenzo in Strada, and the Martinelli-Amati hospice. No fatalities were recorded in Riccione, attributed to the 17 May earthquake. The earthquakes worsened the living conditions of local people, already depressed by the First World War. Unemployment increased considerably. In the exodus to leave Riccione, tourists were leaving their bags at the railway station in the hope that they could shorten their wait to board a train leaving the town.

On 6 April 1921, Rimini's socialist municipal administration endorsed Riccione's request for independence. The border between the comuni was established at the Rio dell'Asse; Rimini had unsuccessfully proposed that the border be further south at the Torrente Marano, to the disapproval of residents residing between the Rio dell'Asse and the Torrente Marano, including in the historic San Lorenzo in Strada. In return for being granted its desired border at the Rio dell'Asse, Minister Aldo Oviglio required Riccione to build a bridge over the Torrente Marano, to allow the completion of the coastal road between Rimini and Riccione. With the border agreed, the Royal Decree 1439 was passed on 19 October 1922 to make Riccione a separate comune.

=== Fascist Italy ===
Silvio Lombardini became the first mayor of Riccione following the inaugural municipal elections on 14 October 1923. By then, Riccione had six hotels and three guesthouses.

The bridge over the Torrente Marano was inaugurated on 24 August 1924. A bridge over the Rio Melo followed on 16 August 1925, completing the coastal road between Rimini and Riccione. Using the new bridges, the Rimini–Riccione tramway, the predecessor to the route 11 trolleybus, was extended from Miramare to Riccione on 26 June 1927.

On 15 July 1929, Riccione inaugurated an aqueduct to bring water from Misano Adriatico along an underground pipeline. Prior to its construction, its water was sourced from the springs in the Fontanelle area, which produced non-potable mineralised water, or brought to the area using unhygienic wooden barrels. The aqueduct was inaugurated with the opening of a new seaside fountain at the end of Villa Ceccarini, constructed at the cost of 15,295 lire.

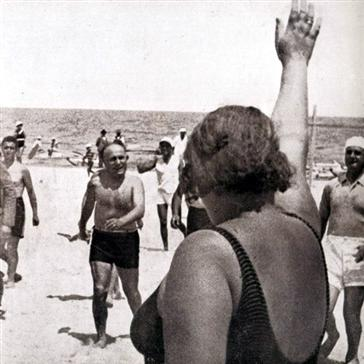
A bather greets Benito Mussolini with the fascist salute on Riccione's beach in 1932.

From 1926, Benito Mussolini, Italy's fascist dictator, began to spend summer holidays in Riccione. In July 1934, Rachele Guidi, Mussolini's second wife, purchased a seaside villa for the family's summer holidays. Mussolini would conduct government business from Riccione during his stays and host notable guests: the family of Austrian chancellor Engelbert Dollfuss were guests of the Mussolinis during his assassination in July 1934, and Mussolini learned of Operation Barbarossa during his stay at the villa in June 1941. The villa was guarded by 150 soldiers, reaching 300 during Mussolini's stays. Mussolini would arrive in Riccione aboard a seaplane, and a 75-metre (246-foot) ship would be stationed off Riccione's coast. In 1940, the villa was renovated and its grounds expanded.

As a result of his association with the area, Riccione's development is cliched as dependent on Mussolini's patronage. Mussolini called Riccione a "land of heroes, most fascist since birth". In 1928, the Azienda di Soggiorno was founded to promote tourism. By 1933, Riccione numbered 1,300 villas, 84 establishments including hotels and guesthouses, and 12 children's summer camps. Riccione attracted 30,000 tourists a year during the 1930s, reaching a peak of 41,000 tourists in 1937.

=== Second World War ===
Following Italy's racial laws, seven Jewish families were evicted from Riccione in 1944, most notably the family of Nissim Matatia, who lived within eyesight of Villa Mussolini.

In early September 1944, during the Italian campaign, Riccione was largely spared the brunt of military movement along the Adriatic Front: most fighting took place in the surrounding hills. Nevertheless, its beaches had been mined. From the evening of 2 September, the Germans retreated to a defensive line at the Rio Melo, defended by a single tank, allowing forces of the 1st Canadian Infantry Division to enter the city; by 12 September, they were reinforced by the 3rd Greek Mountain Brigade, notorious for their poor behaviour towards locals, who were consequently ordered not to pass underneath the railway. The Hotel Adria, no longer extant, was requisitioned for soldiers engaged in the Battle of Rimini to take four days' leave on the beach. The area between Viale Ceccarini and the Rio Melo remained a no man's land until the surrounding hills had been cleared by 18 September.

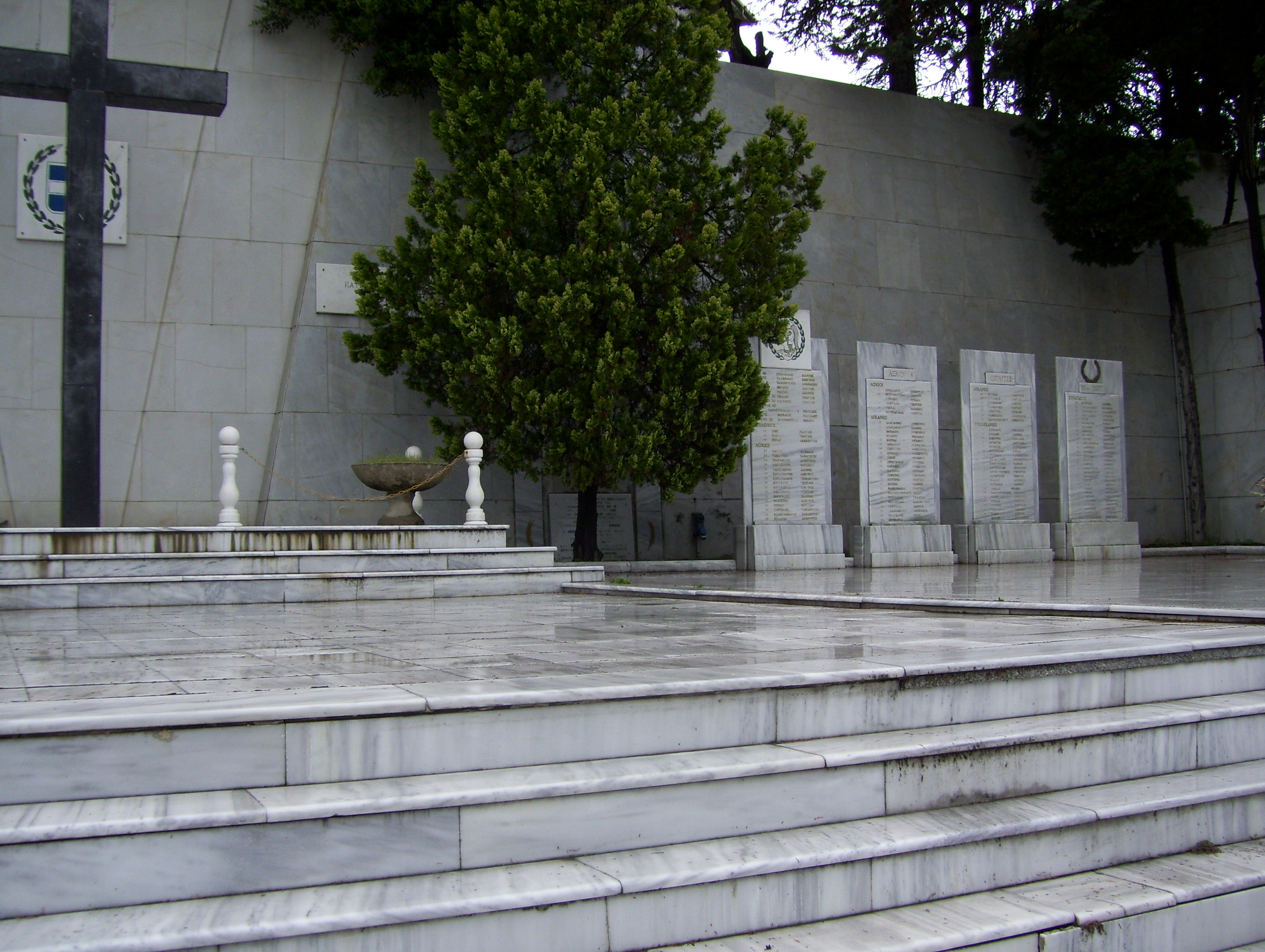
114 Greek soldiers who died during the Battle of Rimini were buried in Riccione's Hellenic Military Cemetery (pictured in January 2006).

Outside the city, San Lorenzo in Strada was heavily fortified by General Richard Heidrich's 1st Parachute Division, who barricaded themselves in the church with instructions to fight until the end. On 3 September, the 1st Parachute Division engaged the Canadians, who had then reached Abyssinia, during their retreat to San Lorenzo. The battle in San Lorenzo, which included sword-fighting in the church, claimed 31 soldiers and 124 wounded or missing, with the Canadians reduced to 18 men before they reorganised on 6 September. A second attack on the night of 12–13 September, supported by the 3rd Greek Battalion and the 20th New Zealand Armoured Regiment, claimed the church after four and a half hours. The church was destroyed. On 13–14 September, a further notable engagement took place in the agricultural hamlets of Monaldini and Monticelli, 500 metres (1,600 feet) southwest of San Lorenzo in Strada; the engagement killed almost 100 troops of the 3rd Greek Mountain Brigade. Riccione was liberated on 20 September, a day before Rimini.

=== Postwar Italy ===
After World War II, Riccione was further popularised by visiting celebrities, including Brazilian footballer Pelé, Mina, Ugo Tognazzi, Vittorio De Sica, and Gina Lollobrigida. Between 1954 and 1967, the city hosted the Winter Rose (Rosa d'Inverno), an annual socialite party by invitation only, first at the Teatro Dante and, following its demolition in 1956, at the Grand Hotel Riccione. The party included beauty pageants, and was followed by a public party for residents, known as the Rosetta. Organised by the municipal government with the Moto Club Celeste Berardi, guests included Sophia Loren, Fred Buscaglione, and Mina.

Riccione's growth as a tourist destination was assisted by the construction of the A14 tolled highway, which reached Riccione in 1968, and Fellini Airport, which ranked among Italy's busiest airports during the 1960s, supported by international tourists visiting Rimini's beaches. Riccione was considered more upmarket and conservative than other resorts along the riviera romagnola. It was especially popular among German tourists, and frequented by Italian workers and farmers as well as employers and aristocrats.

In 1989, Cocoricò opened in front of the Agolanti Castle on Riccione's outskirts. The nightclub, with its distinctive pyramid shape, became an iconic brand and symbol of Riccione's nightlife and youth tourism. It gained notoriety for its provocative and transgressive clubbing, and attracted world-famous disc-jockeys and performers.

== Geography ==
=== Location ===
Riccione sits beside the Adriatic Sea at the southern tip of the Po Valley. It is bordered by the Adriatic Sea to its northeast, with which it has a 6.3-kilometre (3 7/8-mile) coastline, Rimini to its northwest, Coriano to its southwest, and Misano Adriatico to its southeast. Riccione's municipal area is 17.5 square kilometres (6 3/4 square miles).

=== Natural features ===
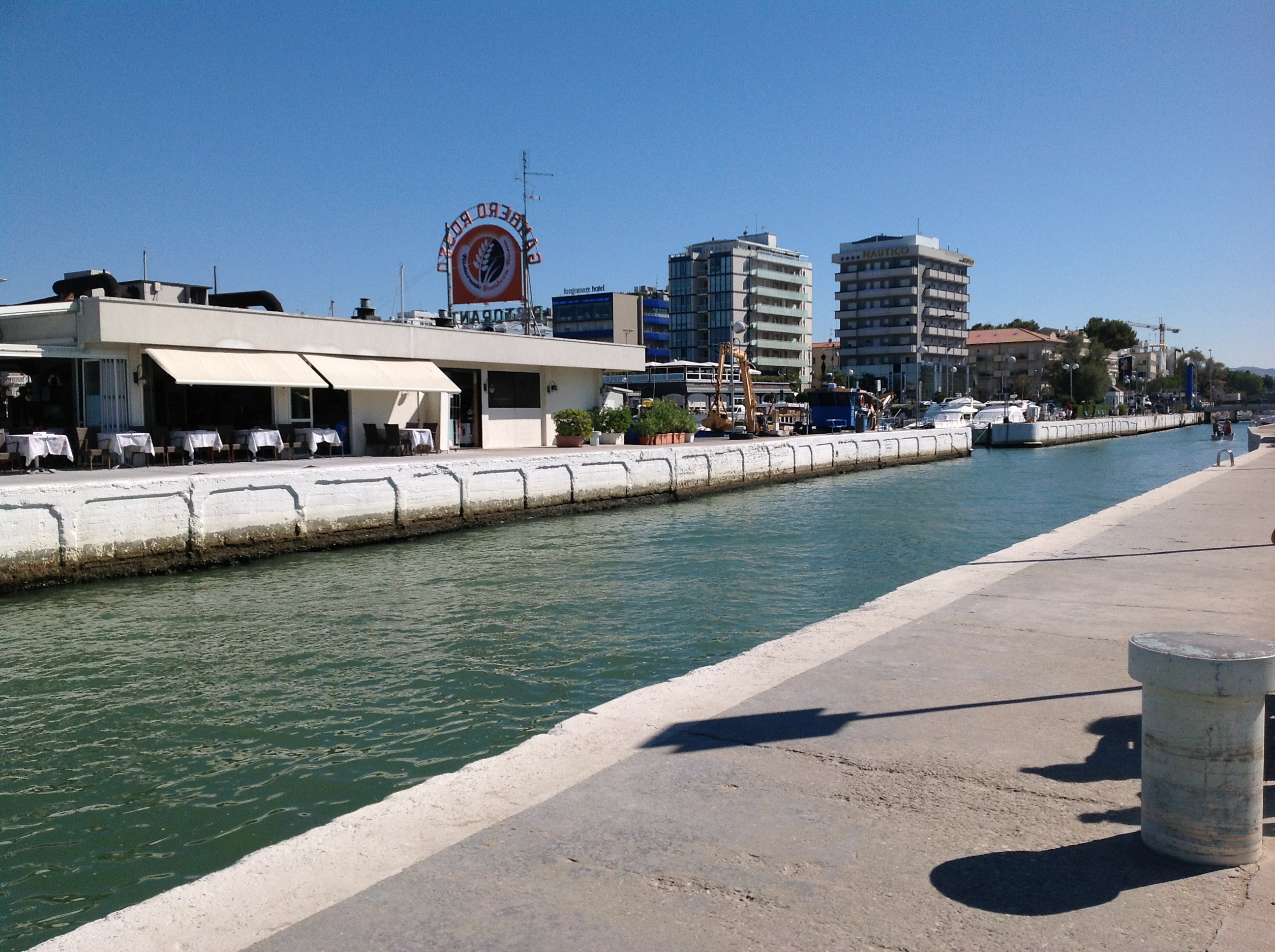
The Rio Melo in Riccione, August 2012

The city is centred on the mouth of the Rio Melo, a 16-kilometre (10-mile) river that flows northeast from the hills of Montescudo and Monte Colombo, with a tributary on each side: the Rio Pedrolara on its left and the Rio Raibano, also called the Rio Grande, on its right. The river was formerly known as the Maranello; the Maltatesta called its valley Valle dei Meli (Valley of Apples), leading to its present name.

Riccione includes several other streams. The Rio dell Asse forms Riccione's northwestern border with Rimini; the Torrente Marano southeast of it is Riccione's largest river. Past the Rio Melo was the Rio Pedroso, which no longer exists, that followed Viale da Verazzano to flow into the Adriatic at the present-day Piazzale Marinai d'Italia. The next stream southeast is the Rio Costa, also known as the Fontanelle. Finally, the Rio Alberello forms Riccione's boundary with Misano Adriatico.

Riccione's principal hill, to its south, is known as Cavrèt d'Arvura. Riccione's maximum elevation is 75 metres (246 feet) above sea level, with a mean elevation of 15.2 metres (50 feet).

=== Districts ===
Riccione's urban area comprises a number of hamlets, some of which were formerly villages. The northernmost hamlets are Marano, at the mouth of the eponymous river, and Spontricciolo, by the Via Flaminia. The north bank of the Rio Melo is called Alba by the coast, while inland, San Lorenzo in Strada on the Via Flaminia is Riccione's oldest settlement. Viale Veneto runs parallel to the Torrente Marano and the Rio Melo between them, providing a discontinuous suburban area between San Lorenzo in Strada and Via Coriano, Riccione's westernmost point at the border with the municipalities of Rimini and Coriano.

Southeast of the Rio Melo is Riccione's city centre. The old town is centred inland on Corso Fratelli Cervi, while the new town is centred on Viale Ceccarini, which connects the Via Flaminia to the coast. South of the Via Flaminia is Villaggio Papini, enclosed by the Rio Melo, the state road, and Viale Enrico Berlinguer. The area by Riccione's A14 tolled highway is called Raibano, and includes several industrial estates. Further southeast of Riccione's city centre are the districts of Fontanelle (inland) and Abissinia (coastal). The Martinelli, a minor stream that ran near the present-day Viale Cesare Battisti, was the boundary between Count Martinelli's subdivision and Abissinia.

Riccione's historic districts were renamed by Rimini's municipal council in 1912. Among the forgotten names are Siberia, which was centred around the present-day Viale Ugo Bassi, between the centre and Abissinia.

== Demographics ==
As of 2023, Riccione had an estimated population of 34,514, constituting approximately 10% of the Province of Rimini's population. This implies a population density of 1,972 people per square-kilometre. In 2022, Riccione was estimated to have 689 European Union (EU) citizens (excluding Italian citizens) and 2,599 non-EU citizens. Its population included 546 nonagenarians and 17 centenarians.

== Government ==
Riccione is a comune, administered by the municipal council. As of 2023, the municipal council numbers the Mayor and twenty-four councillors.

Until 19 October 1922, with the passing of Royal Decree 1439, Riccione was a frazione of the municipality of Rimini. On 16 April 1992, the municipality transferred from the Province of Forlì to the newly created Province of Rimini.

== Economy ==
=== Tourism ===
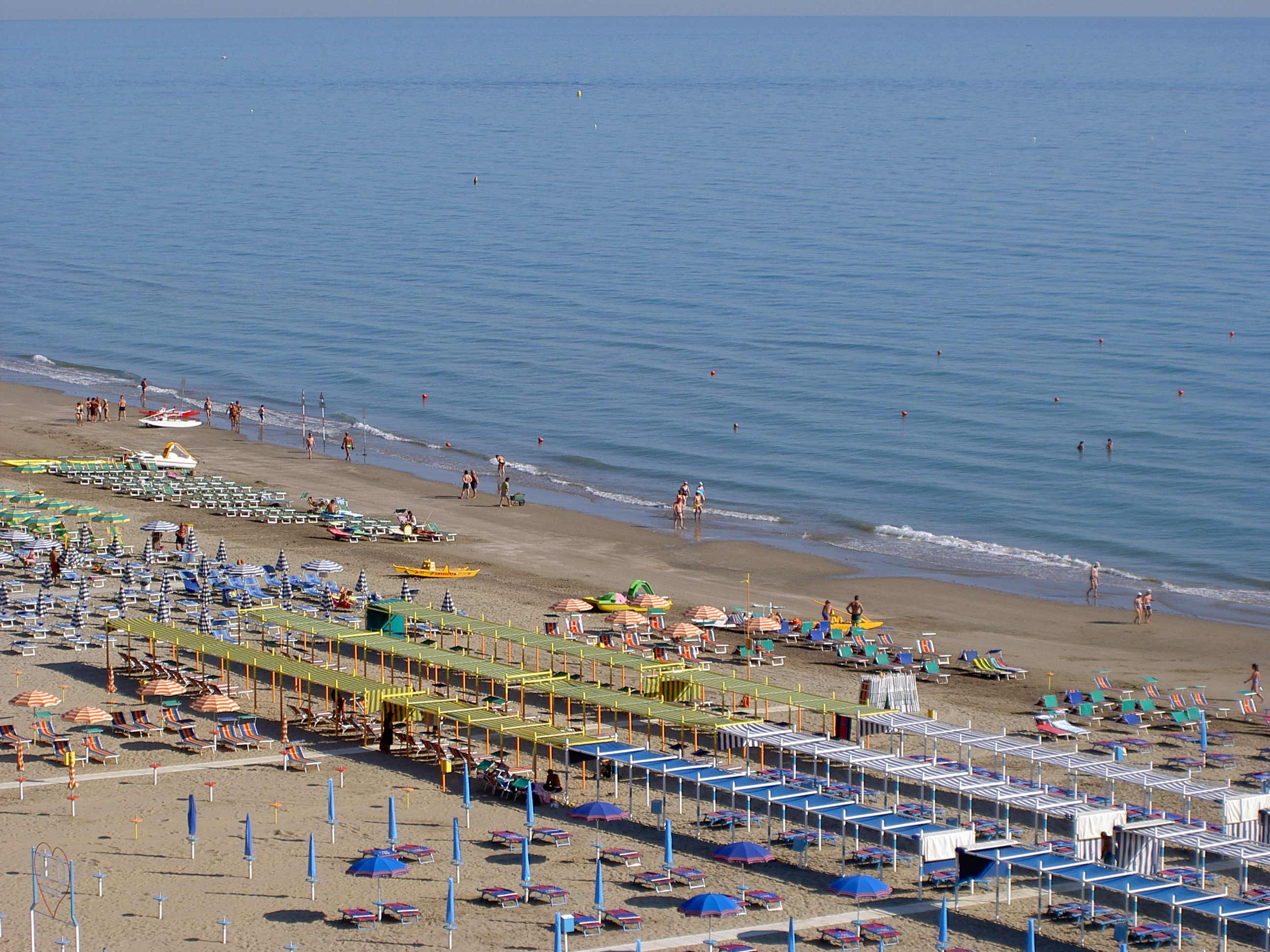
Riccione's beach, July 2005

In November 1926, Riccione was officially designated as a tourist resort, with the power to run its own tourist agency. Since then, the city has been one of the principal seaside resorts on the riviera romagnola, known for its wide, sandy beaches. Of its 6.3 kilometres (3 7/8 miles) of coastline, only 233 metres (255 yd) are prohibited for bathing by the mouths of the Torrente Marano and Rio Melo. In 2020, Riccione numbered 432 hotels, residences, and other accommodation facilities, and 383 restaurants, bars, and chiringuitos, of which 109 are seasonal.

Riccione is particularly popular among young tourists, who are drawn by its nightlife. Cocoricò, one of Italy's most famous nightclubs, opened in 1989. There are several camping sites in Riccione's southwest, on its border with Misano Adriatico. Riccione also attracts families for its beaches and amusement parks, including Aquafan, a waterpark opened in 1987.

=== Industry ===
Riccione has industrial zones near Raibano. In 2013, Riccione's municipal government approved plans for a new industrial zone next to the airport. The zone includes warehouses and artisanal workshops, such as dry cleaners, carpenters, glassworks, printing plants, and metalworking shops. Among Riccione's notable companies is PhotoSì, a photographic printing company that developed from Riccione's tourism.

== Arts and culture ==
The summer touristic season in Riccione includes the annual Notte rosa (Pink Night), a weekend cultural festival held in early July that includes exhibitions, music concerts, and firework displays. The festival is held across the riviera romagnola, over which it is estimated to attract two million visitors and revenues exceeding €200 million.

Several venues in Riccione are dedicated to art and culture:

- Built in 1938 as the first structure on the Adriatic dedicated to the promotion of tourism, the Palazzo del Turismo hosts conferences, exhibitions, and other events. It is the site of the annual Convegno filatelico numismatico (Numismatic-Philatelic Conference), first held in 1950.
- Since 2004, the Villa Franceschi on Via Gorizia has hosted a gallery dedicated to modern and contemporary art.
- Villa Mussolini, belonging to the Municipality of Riccione, has hosted cultural events and exhibitions since its reopening in 2005. It hosts the annual DIG Award, a prize for documentary film investigative journalism that was dedicated to Ilaria Alpi until 2014.
- Launched in 2021, Cocoricò's Museo Discocratico (Discocratic Museum, or MUDI) is the first digital museum hosted in an Italian nightclub, with immersive experiences in NFT and three-dimensional art.

Riccione Theater Award, biennial, last week of June. Riccione TTV - Theater Television Video, biennial, last week of May.

Several films are set in Riccione, including Violent Summer (1961), Girl with a Suitcase (1961), and Weekend, Italian Style (1966).

== Cityscape ==
=== Architecture ===
Many of Riccione's residential villas were developed in Liberty style, an Italian variant of Art Nouveau. Particularly characteristic of these villas are their turrets, which offer a local panorama. Riccione's urban landscape is heavily influenced Augusto Cicchetti, who designed much of Riccione's seafront and gardens.

=== Main sights ===
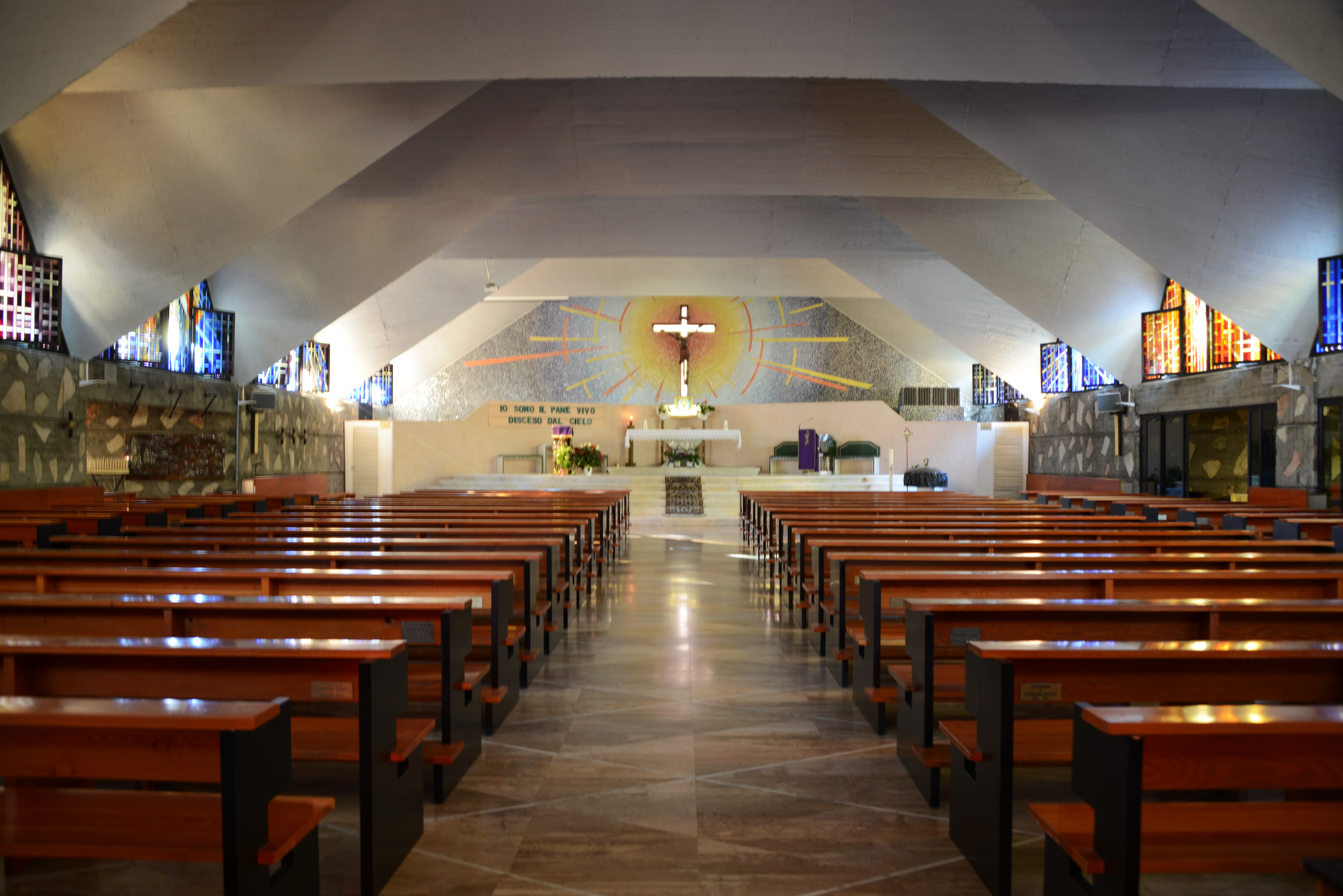
The new church of San Martino, August 2015

==== Religious buildings ====
- Church of San Martino. First recorded in January 1177, located in the area of the present-day Fontanelle, the medieval church was destroyed by an earthquake on Christmas Day 1786. The church was rebuilt at its present location on Corso Fratelli Cervi, and consecrated on 8 November 1789. San Martino contains the relics of Blessed Alessio Monaldi, a farmer who has been venerated locally since the late 16th century. To accommodate Riccione's growing population, a second, modern church also dedicated to St Martin of Tours was consecrated on 10 March 1963, less than 280 metres (310 yards) away from the old church as the crow flies.
- Church of San Lorenzo in Strada. The church was first recorded in 997 AD, likely on a site of pre-Christian worship. The original church was destroyed by the 1916 earthquake. The first stone of the new church was laid on 3 August 1919; it was designed by the architect Giuseppe Gualandi, and, despite the opposition of the local socialists, it was completed for Christmas Eve 1922. The church was officially consecrated on 26 August 1923. The belltower was blessed on 6 January 1925. In early September 1944, the church was destroyed again after it was fortified by retreating German forces.
- Church of Stella Maris in Fontanelle. The church was built and consecrated in 1963 to the design of architect Luigi Fonti to cater to Fontanelle's growing population; it was expanded in 1987, including the addition of an 18-metre (59-foot) belltower. A votive cell, recording the spot where Monaldi was said to have uncovered a water source for thirsty pilgrims, flanks the church.
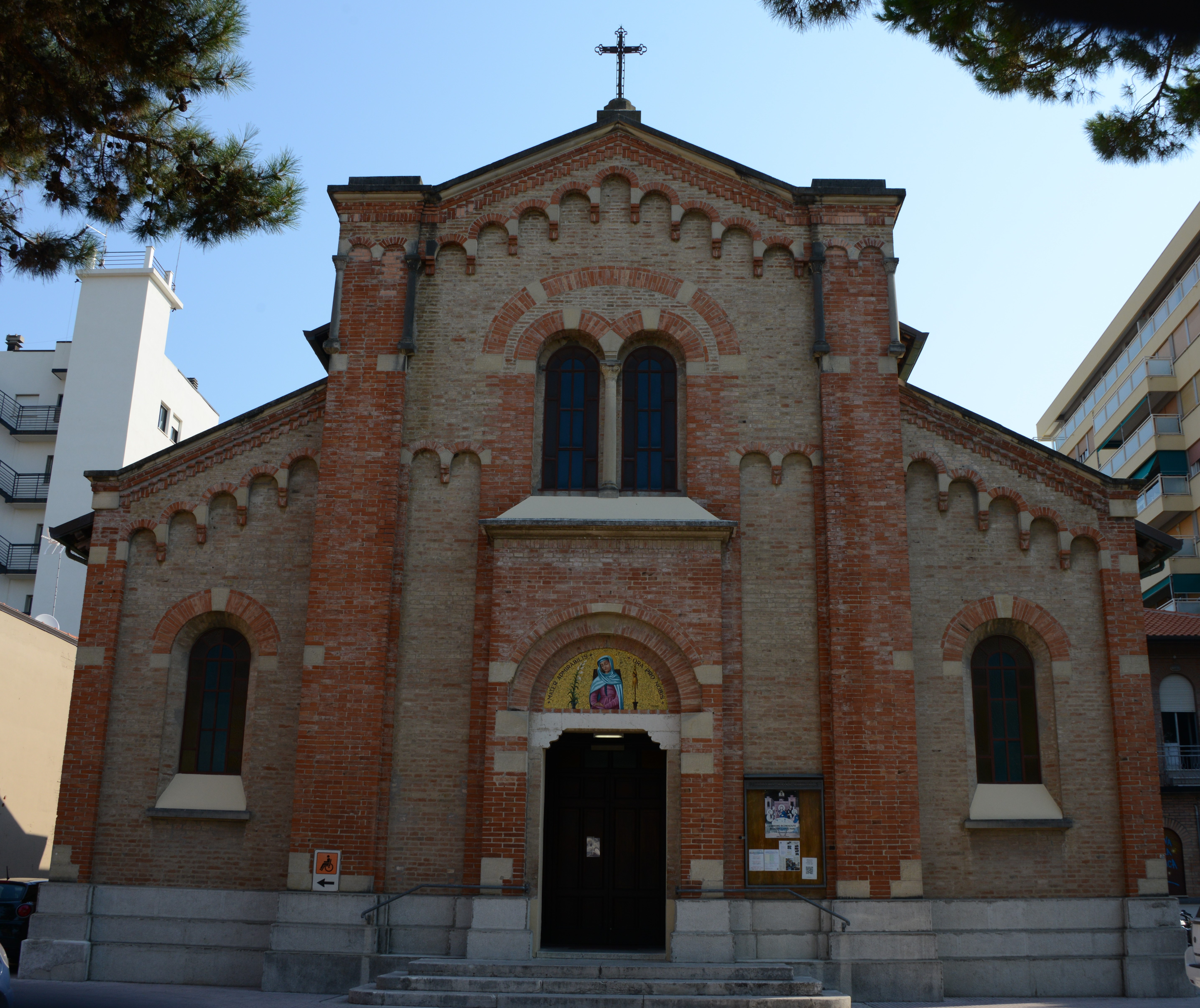
- Church of Santa Maria Mater Admirabilis, August 2015
  Church of Santa Maria Mater Admirabilis. Following Riccione's development, Martinelli renovated a stable on his estate into a chapel. In 1908, Rosa Manusardi launched an appeal for a seaside church. Martinelli donated 1,000 lire and the necessary land to its construction. The first stone was laid on 8 August 1909; it was designed by Giuseppe Camperio and executed by Luigi Tonetti. The Piva family donated a copy of the Mater Admirabilis fresco, which became the church's altarpiece and lent it its name. The church was seriously damaged by the 1916 earthquake; the Holy See offered 5,000 lire towards its reconstruction. The presbytery was completed in 1927, following a donation by Countess Chiara Soleri Martinelli, and settled into by the Comboni Missionaries. The church's belltower has three bells.

==== Secular buildings ====
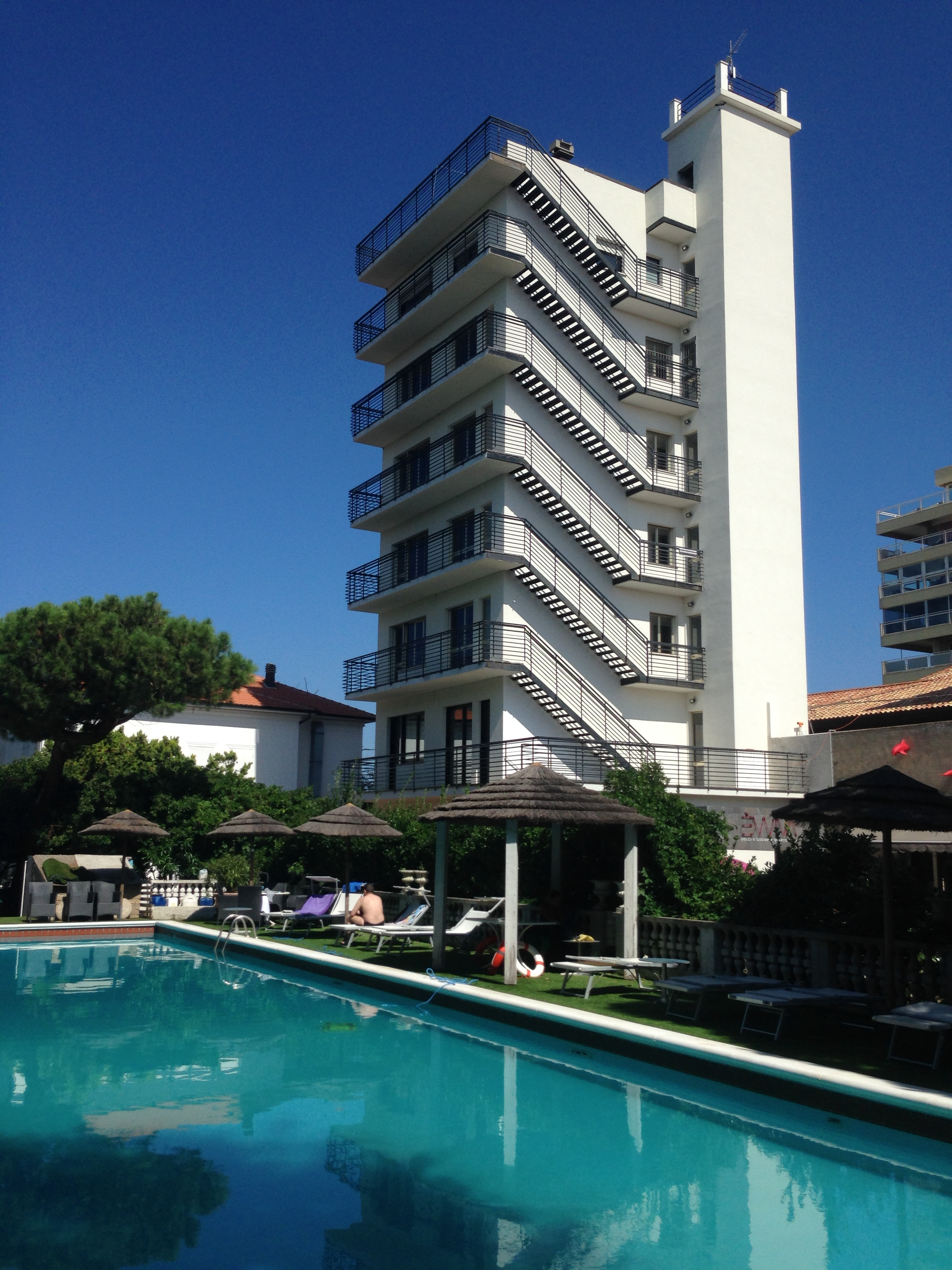
- Renato Camus' Torre 900 of the Grand Hotel Riccione, August 2014
  Grand Hotel Riccione. Inaugurated in 1929, the hotel was founded by Milanese entrepreneur Gaetano Ceschina, and designed by architect Rutilio Ceccolini. In 1934, it was expanded with a tower annexe designed by Renato Camus. The hotel was used by foreign dignatories visiting Benito Mussolini, Italy's fascist dictator, during his stays in Riccione, while the tower annexe was used as an operational control and security centre by his private secretariat. After the Second World War, the hotel symbolised Riccione's growth as an upmarket seaside resort, hosting extravagant parties. The hotel closed in 2010 following an inheritance dispute. It partially reopened in July 2023, but its management company was declared bankrupt two months later. The hotel's architecture is the Liberty style variant of Art Nouveau, inspired by Gino Coppedè, with sober and elegant lines that subdue Coppedè's eccentricism. Previous guests at the hotel include Francesco Cossiga, President of Italy, Princess Haya bint Hussein of Jordan, and Emmanuel Milingo, excommunicated Archbishop of Lusaka.
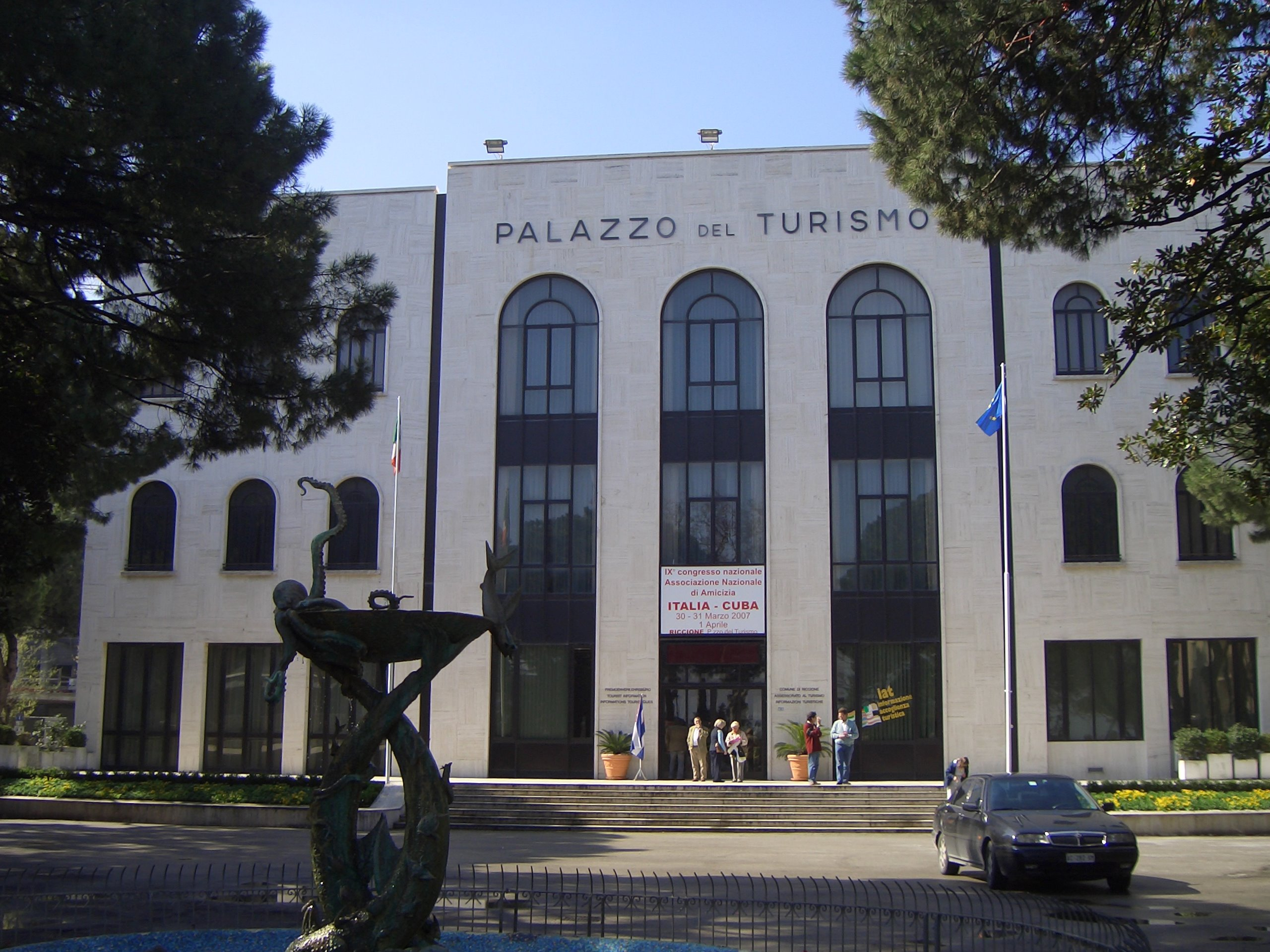
- The Palazzo del Turismo and the Swimmer's Fountain, March 2007
  Palazzo del Turismo. The first structure on the Adriatic dedicated to the promotion of tourism, it was built in 1938, to the design of Gogliardo Ossani, imitating Rome's Palazzo delle Esposizioni. It was opened on 28 October 1938 and inaugurated on 28 May 1939. In 1951, Ossani added a floor to its two lateral wings. The building was renovated and expanded at the end of 1970 and in the 1980s. The Swimmer's Fountain in front of the building, the work of architect Elio Monesi and sculptor Remo Braschi, was donated by the Milanese Manicone family in memory of their son, who was killed in a road accident. The fountain was inaugurated on 15 June 1958. Today, the three-storey structure hosts the municipal government's tourist agency, as well as conferences, exhibitions, and other events.
- Hotel des Bains. It was inaugurated in 1908, and seriously damaged in the 1916 earthquake.
- Hotel de la Ville. It dates to the 1930s.

==== Villas ====
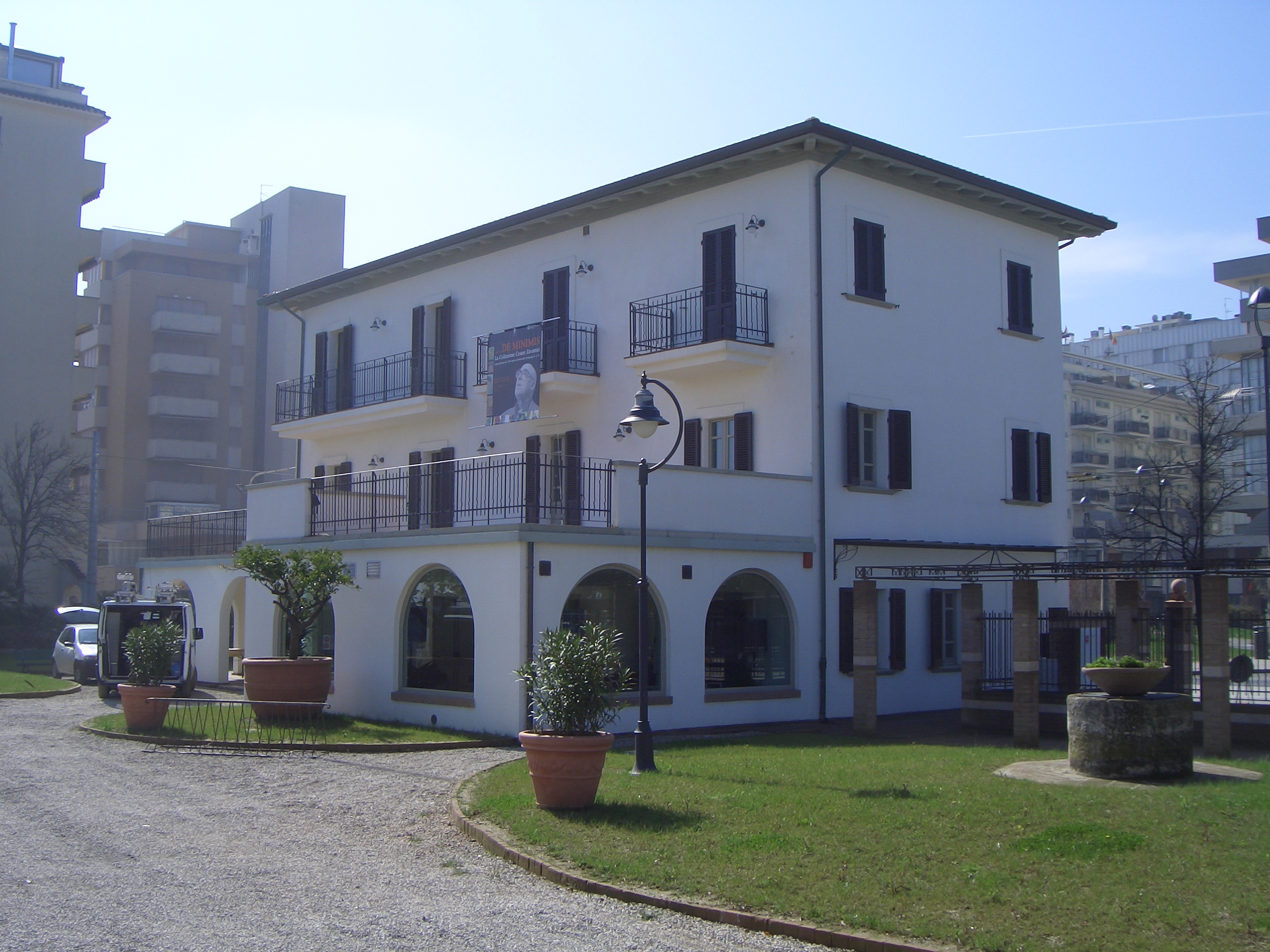
Villa Mussolini, April 2007

- Villa Mussolini. Built in 1892, in 1934, the villa was purchased by Rachele Guidi, second wife of Benito Mussolini, Italy's fascist dictator; the Mussolinis used the villa as a summer holiday home. In 1940, the villa was renovated and its grounds expanded. The villa was renovated in 2005, and hosts cultural events and exhibitions.
- Villa Franceschi, which, since 2004, has hosted a gallery dedicated to modern and contemporary art. The villa is characterised by its semi-hexagonal shape, with a staircase on its central axis and rooms on the sides. A large terrace extends into the garden. The villa was constructed between 1900 and 1910, and substantially modified after the 1916 earthquakes. Its external concrete decorations are the work of Guerrino Giorgetti. The villa was bought by the Bolognese Franceschi family in 1919, who added its turret, garage, and servant's cottage in the 1920s. The municipal government became the villa's owner in 1953. Before its restoration in 2001, it was at various times a municipal library, secondary school annexe, and employment office.
- Villa Antolini. The villa was designed by Mario Mirko Vucetich in 1923, and constructed for Dante and Egle Antolini. It is known as the "villa of the Americans" by local people. In 1968, after Dante's death, the villa was rented and later sold.
- Villa Lodi Fè. The villa was built by Decio Monti of Bologna, and is thought to date to the 1900s. It is located within the Pope John Paul II Park, and is distinguished by its chalet-style shape, accentuated by its archivolted windows.
- Villa Martinelli Soleri. The Art Nouveau villa was built between 1878 and 1879; its turret dates to 1877. The original villa was almost entirely demolished after the Second World War, but its upper-floor terracotta balustrade and Moorish pointed openings are still extant.
- Pensione Florenza. It dates to the early 1900s.
- Villino Graziosi. It dates to 1932.
- Villa Serafini. It dates to the 1920s.

==== Attractions ====
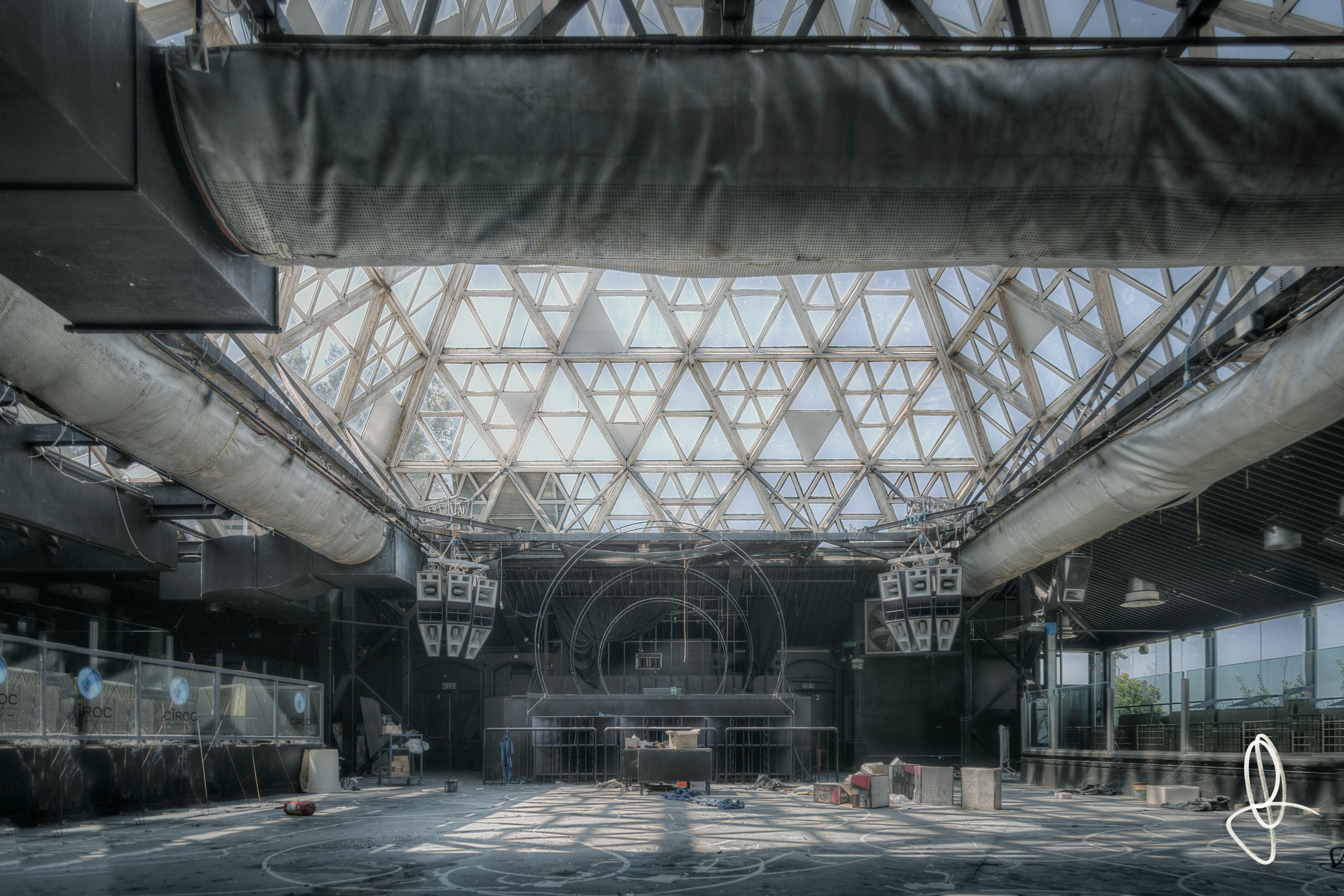
- Piramide, the main room of Cocoricò, July 2019
  Cocoricò. Opened in 1989 in front of the Agolanti Castle on Riccione's outskirts, the nightclub specialises in techno, house, and tech house music. During the 1990s, its name and pyramid shape became an iconic brand and symbol of Riccione's nightlife and youth tourism. It gained notoriety for its provocative and transgressive clubbing, and attracted world-famous disc-jockeys and performers. In 2015, DJ Magazine's readers voted Cocoricò sixteenth worldwide in its annual Top 100 Clubs poll, describing it as "a monumental Mecca of dance music".
- Aquafan, a waterpark opened in 1987. The park is among the most visited in Italy, with 600,000 visitors annually.

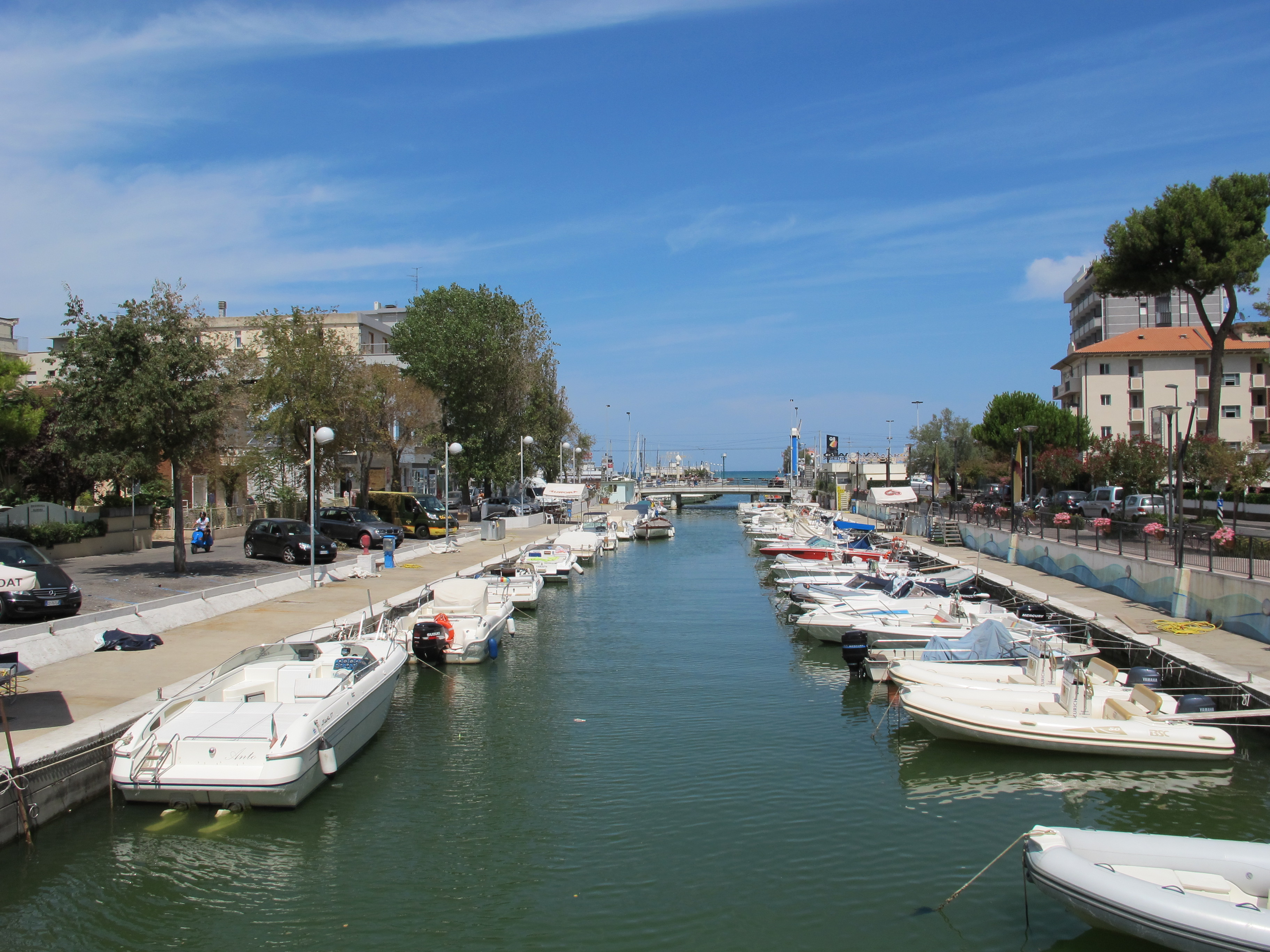
The Port of Riccione, August 2012

==== Other landmarks ====
- Port of Riccione. The Port of Riccione was built between 1896 and 1901, with a contribution of an interest-free loan of 24,00 lire from Maria Boorman Ceccarini, who also covered the cost of the access road. It was constructed by the company of Luigi Bartoldi. The port features two parallel piers, with berths for 500 small boats on either side of the Rio Melo. In 1913, the corroded wooden piers were replaced with concrete, and the bed was cleaned in 1933, thanks to Mussolini's intervention. The Saviolina, a fishing launch built in 1926 that was later converted into a tourist pleasure boat, is moored in the port; it has been protected by Italy's Ministry of Cultural Heritage since 1998.
- Hellenic Military Cemetery. Located along the Via Flaminia in the Fontanelle area, the cemetery includes the graves of 114 soldiers of the 3rd Greek Mountain Brigade that died during the Battle of Rimini.

== Parks and recreation ==
Riccione numbers several parks, including: Parco della Resistenza, Parco Allesandrini, Parco Centrale (or John Paul II Park), Giardini Montanari (or Giardini Longo), Luna Park, Parco dei Ciliegi, Giardini la Malfa, Giardini Caduti Arma Carabinieri, Giardini Turati, Parco della Chiesa, Parco Rossa, and Parco delle Rose.

== Health and education ==
The Ceccarini Hospital was inaugurated on 23 October 1893; its foundation stone was laid on 25 April 1892. The hospital was built to treat, free of charge, sick patients from seven surrounding parishes. In 1895, Maria Ceccarini, the hospital's foundress, purchased several farms to allow the hospital to be self-sufficient.

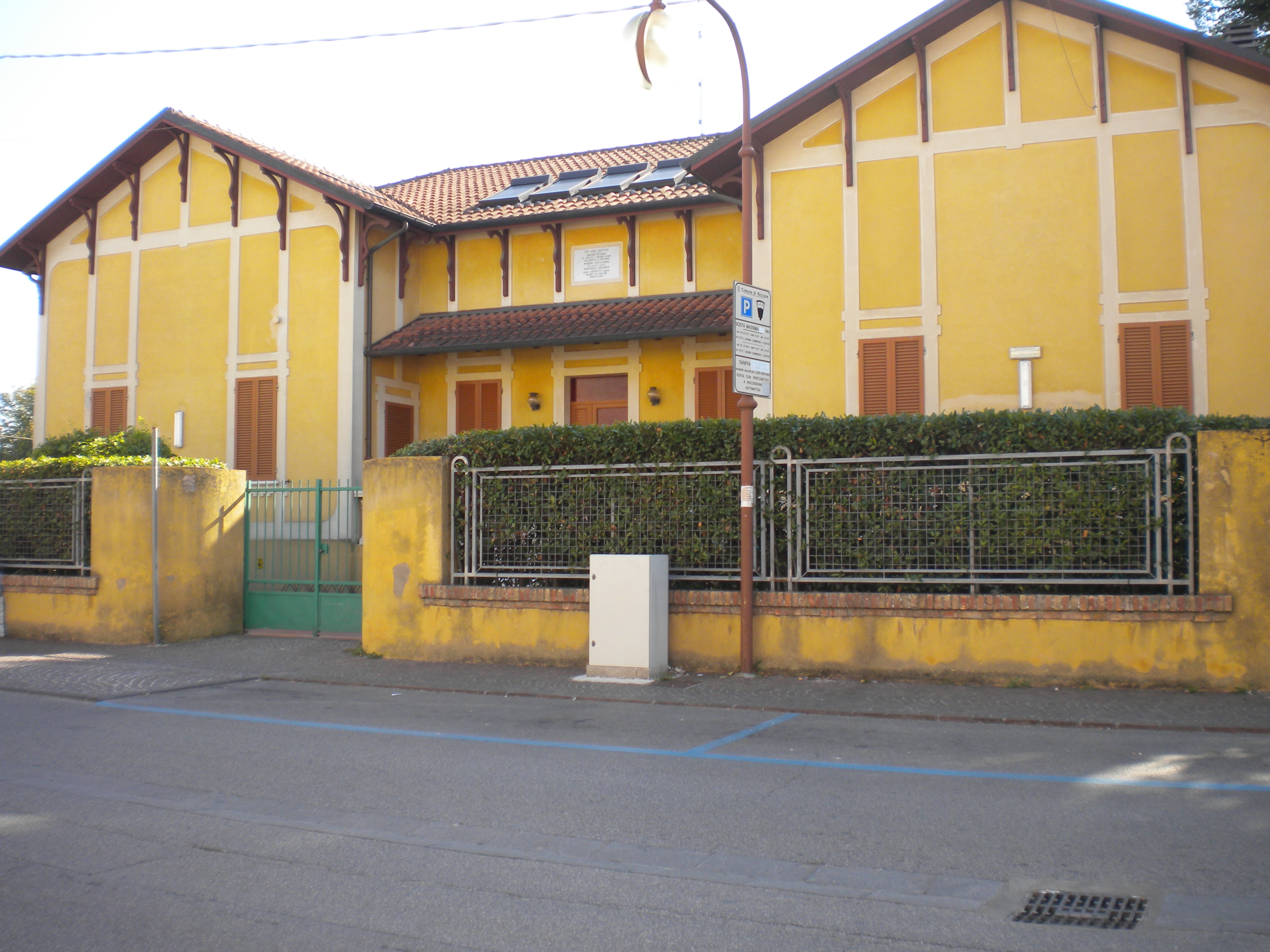
The Ceccarini kindergarten, September 2010

The Ceccarini kindergarten was inaugurated on 1 November 1891, on Corso Fratelli Cervi and next to the Ceccarini Hospital. It was rebuilt after being destroyed by the 1916 earthquakes. Until the 1930s, it was the only kindergarten in the city. Its management was ceded to the municipal government in 1982. The kindergarten was renovated in the late 1980s and between 2003 and 2004.

Riccione's civic library began as a circulating library for a mutual aid workers' society. In 1889, it received a 200 lire donation from Ceccarini; by 1892, it numbered 764 books. A fixed civic library opened on Viale Corridoni in February 1953, moving to the Villa Franceschi in the 1960s and then to Via Sirtori. In May 1987, the purpose-built library was inaugurated on Viale Lazio. In 2013, it was dedicated to Professor Osvaldo Berni.

== Transport ==
=== Roads ===
Riccione is on the ancient Via Flaminia, running from Rome to Rimini. Much of the Roman route forms part of the north-south SS16 state road, except a bypass in the city centre. Further inland, the A14 tolled highway runs along the Adriatic Sea between Bologna and Taranto. Riccione's junction is located before the suburb of Raibano, and connected to the main peripheral road by Viale Enrico Berlinguer dual carriageway. After reaching the Rimini Sud junction from the north on 13 August 1966, the highway was extended southwards to reach Riccione's junction on 15 May 1968. The section between Rimini Sud and Riccione includes the Montefeltrio service area, located within Riccione's boundaries. On 22 July 1968, the section from Riccione to Cattolica was opened.

Rural roads connect Riccione to towns and villages in the hinterland, including Coriano and Morciano di Romagna.

=== Railway station ===
Riccione
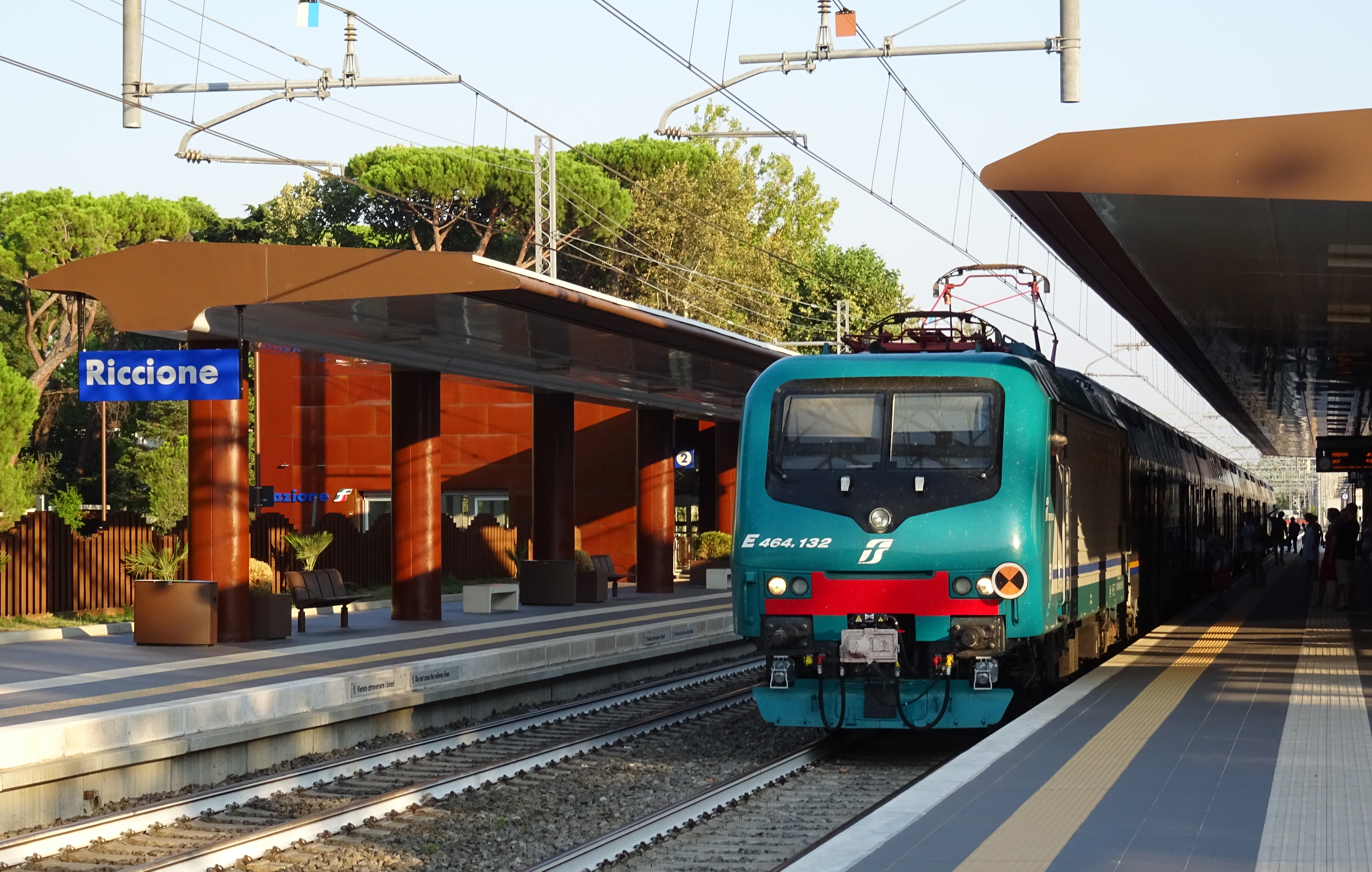
- Riccione railway station in August 2018

General information
- Location: Piazzale della Stazione; Riccione, Emilia-Romagna; Italy
- Line: Bologna–Ancona railway
- Platforms: 2
- Train operators: Trenitalia
- Connections: Metromare; Routes 43B, 58 bus

History
- Opened: 1891
Location

Riccione railway station (Italian: Stazione FS di Riccione) is a station on the Bologna–Ancona railway. In 2019, the station had an average weekday passenger entry and exit total of 3,377 in July and 1,831 in November for regional and fast regional (regionale veloce) trains only.

As of February 2024, the station is served by regional, fast regional, InterCity, and high-speed Frecciarossa trains. As is typical on the Italian network, trains scheduled at different times of the day call at different combinations or numbers of stations along similar routes, and often terminate at different stations. Regional trains calling at Riccione typically run to Ancona, Bologna Centrale or Pesaro, while fast regional trains typically run to Ancona, Bologna Centrale or Piacenza. The InterCity and Frecciarossa trains extend to Lecce and Milano Centrale, or terminate at major stops before those stations, such as Pescara Centrale or Bari Centrale. There are infrequent or seasonal direct trains to Torino Porta Nuova, Roma Termini, and Venezia Santa Lucia. There is a seasonal EuroNight service to München Hauptbahnhof.

Following the opening of the railway through Riccione on 17 November 1861, Tonini proposed a station in Riccione to support his summer camps for children with scrofula. Following his campaign, from 1 January 1862, trains to Rimini experimentally stopped at Riccione. Tonini ensured that the stop was used sufficiently such that, from 1865, the stop was made permanent and formalised at the railway's level crossing with Viale Viola (now Viale Maria Ceccarini). In 1891, a permanent station was built at the present site at the end of Viale Diaz.

The station was modernised between 2016 and 2018, at a cost of 8 million euros. The modernisation was part of a programme to increase the speed of trains running from Bologna along the Adriatic. As part of the works, the sea-facing station entrance was rebuilt, and an island platform between the tracks was eliminated. Also renovated were the historic passenger building and the underpass, which was equipped with lifts. The northbound track was moved closer towards the seaside, and its adjacent platform was reconstructed and raised to provide easier access to the trains. To celebrate the inauguration of the new station on 15 June 2018, a promotion exempted tourists staying in Riccione's hotels from the tourist tax if they arrived by train.

=== Aviation ===
The city is served by Federico Fellini International Airport in Miramare; the southern part of the airport falls in Riccione's jurisdiction. The airport is a crucial nexus in the local economy, particularly for tourists visiting the riviera romagnola. It recorded 215,767 passengers in 2022, rendering it the second-busiest airport in Emilia-Romagna. The airport is mainly served by low-cost carriers and charter traffic.

The airport was built in 1929 as an aerodrome, on the site of the former Rimini-Riccione Defence Section of the army's Aeronautical Service. It ranked among Italy's busiest airports during the 1960s, supported by international tourists visiting local beaches. Its passenger use declined with the opening of the A14 tolled highway in 1966. Since the end of the Cold War, Fellini Airport has been specially popular among tourists from the countries of the former Soviet Union. Russian and Ukrainian passengers together represented 61% of Fellini Airport's passengers before the 2022 invasion, which was projected to lose the airport 300,000 passengers annually. Alongside its civilian history, the airport has a notable military history: it was the home of the 5th Aerobrigade of the Italian Air Force between 1956 and 2010, and during the Cold War, it was identified by the Warsaw Pact as a strategic target in the event of an all-out war, housing several thousand Italian and NATO soldiers and thirty B61 nuclear bombs. Helicopters belonging to the 7th Army Aviation Regiment "Vega" remain at the airport.

After Fellini Airport, the closest major airports are Luigi Ridolfi Airport in Forlì, Raffaello Sanzio Airport in Ancona, and Guglielmo Marconi Airport in Bologna.

=== Buses and coaches ===
Rimini and Riccione's combined bus network, operated by Start Romagna SpA, includes twenty-two suburban lines and twenty-six interurban lines. As well as serving the city's suburbs, the lines connect Riccione to towns and villages in the hinterland and to neighbouring comuni along the Adriatic coast.

Rimini's trolleybus system comprises two trolleybus lines that connect the city centres of Rimini and Riccione: route 11 and Metromare; both are run by Start Romagna SpA. Route 11 runs from Rimini's railway station to Riccione Terme along the principal seafront avenue, serving the touristic seafront. The route, then an electric tram, first arrived in Riccione on 26 June 1927, only now made possible by newly built carriageable bridges over the Torrente Marano and Rio Melo. To finance the extension from Miramare, the municipality of Riccione loaned 300,000 lire from the Cassa di Risparmio di Rimini in October 1926. The route was converted to a trolleybus line in 1939. Its route in Riccione has been reconfigured several times. It originally terminated in Viale Ceccarini; in 1939, it was shortened to Piazzale dei Giardini, and reconfigured shortly afterwards to terminate on the piazzale's mountain-facing side, thereby avoiding trolleybuses passing near the seaside Villa Mussolini and disturbing guests. In 1985, the line was rerouted along the principal seafront avenue rather than Viale Dante. The route was extended to Piazza Eugenio Curiel in 1994, and to Riccione Terme in 2000.

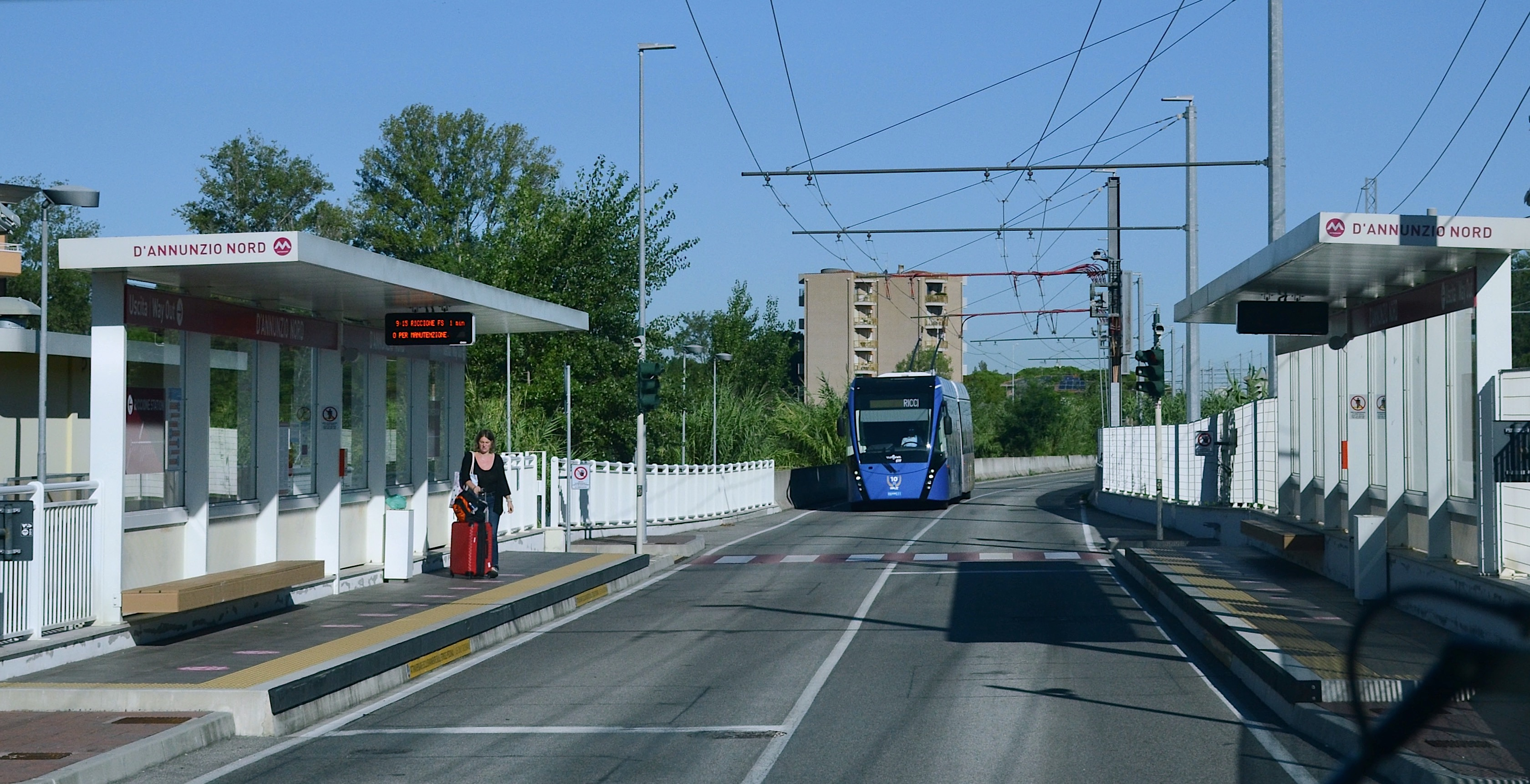
D'Annunzio Nord is one of six Metromare stations located within Riccione.

Metromare was launched on 23 November 2019, provisionally using motorbuses because of a delay in the delivery of the trolleybus fleet. The 9.8-kilometre (6 1/8 mi) bus rapid transit line runs on a segregated track adjacent to the Bologna-Ancona railway between the stations of Rimini and Riccione. Intermediate stops serve the Fiabilandia amusement park in Rivazzurra, Miramare's railway station, and Federico Fellini International Airport. The route has six stops in Riccione: Marano, D'Annunzio Nord, Alba, Dante, Porto (above the Rio Melo), and Ceccarini Riccione Station. The trolleybuses entered service on the line on 28 October 2021. A 4.2-kilometre (2 5/8-mile) northern extension to Rimini Fiera has been approved, with construction starting in summer 2024. The third stage of the Metromare is expected to be a southern extension to Misano and Cattolica.

Metromare's construction evoked notable opposition in Riccione, straining the relationship between Riccione's municipal government and the other public agencies involved in the project. Objections particularly concerned a retaining concrete wall along the track, the felling of trees, and the decision to launch the route provisionally using motorbuses. A rejected alternative route in Riccione along existing roads nearer to the seafront was supported by the municipal council, the city's hoteliers association, a Rimini-based industrial trade association, and the provincial president of Confcommercio, an association of commercial enterprises. In January 2021, the preliminary heading judge of the Court of Rimini indicted Renata Tosi, Riccione's mayor from 2014 to 2022, for abuse of office, relating to ordinances she issued to obstruct Metromare's construction. The project's contractor had sued Tosi for civil damage claims of 2.35 million euros. Tosi was acquitted at the trial in July 2022.

During the summer months, several coach companies connect Riccione to other Italian cities, particularly in Northern Italy.

== Sports ==
=== Municipal Sports Centre "Italo Nicoletti" ===
The Municipal Sports Centre "Italo Nicoletti" is a multi-purpose sports complex, just opposite San Lorenzo in Strada on the Via Flaminia, which includes a central football stadium with an athletics track, an indoor and outdoor Olympic-size swimming pool, five football fields, a baseball or softball court, a gym, a boxing gym, six covered tennis courts, and two covered tennis or volleyball courts. Since October 2003, the complex has been named after Italo Nicoletti, who served as the secretary of the local football club from 1953 until 1978, president of the complex from 1981 until his death in 1996, and president of Riccione's tourist board between 1985 and its dissolution in 1986.

The "Italo Nicoletti" Stadium was inaugurated on 26 September 1962. It has stands only on its western wing. In 2023, the stadium's pitch was expanded to accommodate matches up to Italy's Serie C.

Since 1997, the "Italo Nicoletti" swimming pool has hosted an annual Trofeo Italo Nicoletti swimming competition.

=== Clubs and competitions ===
Founded in January 1933, Riccione's Nautical Club historically organised regattas. It now hosts cultural activities, events, exhibitions, meetings, and conferences dedicated to sailing. The club also offers sailing courses. Since 1946, it has been affiliated with the Italian Sailing Federation. In addition to the Nautical Club, there are various windsurfing and kitesurfing clubs along Riccione's coast. Next to the Villa Mussolini is a club dedicated to padel tennis, with three padel courts and two tennis courts.

Between 1954 and 1973, Riccione hosted the Trofeo Manicone, a swimming competition including a 6-kilometre (3 1/2-mile) race along the shore. Riccione represented Italy in the 1967 and 1989 editions of the international sports-based television show Jeux sans frontières, and was a host city in the 1971 and 1975 editions. In 2004 and 2012, Riccione hosted the FINA World Masters Championships, a multidisciplinary aquatics competition. In 2022, the "Italo Nicoletti" swimming pool and several beachside spots hosted the World Life Saving Championships.

Since 1989, Riccione has hosted the biennial Festival del Sole, a street gymnastics festival. The festival, which has previously included over 5,000 participants, attracts 15,000 visitors in Riccione's hotels. In October 2023, the organisers announced that the festival would move to neighbouring Rimini from the 2024 edition; the decision was reversed the following month.

== Notable people ==
- Paolo Cevoli (born 1958), comedian, was born and raised in Riccione
- Martina Colombari (born 1975), actress and Miss Italia 1991, was born in Riccione
- Carlotta Montanari (born 1981), actress, was raised in Riccione
- Mattia Pasini (born 1985), motorcycle road racer, was born and raised in Riccione
- Sandra Sabattini (1961–1984), blessed of the Catholic Church, was born in Riccione
- Isabella Santacroce (born 1970), novelist, was born and raised in Riccione
- Madhu Sapre (born 1971), Indian supermodel, lives in Riccione
