= San Fortunato, Rimini =

Roman Catholic church in Italy

San Fortunato, also once known as Santa Maria Annuziata Nuova di Scolca, is a Roman Catholic parish church in Rimini, Italy.

== History ==
The church was founded in 1418, after a donation by Carlo Malatesta, to the Benedictine Order of Monte Oliveto Maggiore. The site had belonged to an order of Friars of San Paolo Eremita. The church was initially attached to the Olivetan Abbey till the Napoleonic suppression in 1797. The monastery was demolished in 1802. After suppression, the title of San Fortunato parish was transferred to this church.

The façade has the coat of arms of Roberto Malatesta (Lord of Rimini from 1468 to 1482), while the interior ceiling has the heraldry of Carlo Malatesta. The two lateral chapels were frescoed in the early 16th century. That on the right by Girolamo Marchesi. The one on the left, once had an altarpiece of Giorgio Vasari, now found in the choir. The church and adjacent structures suffered from bombing during World War II, and were only partially reconstructed.

The Vasari altarpiece now in the choir depicts the Adoration of the Magi by Giorgio Vasari. Another altarpiece depicts St Benedict, Mauro, and Placido, painted by the Augustinian friar Pronti.

In 2008, a Museo di Scolca was established next door with artwork from the convent.
