= Mine workers council elections in the First Czechoslovak Republic =

Between 1920 and 1936 miners in Czechoslovakia elected representative councils. Several different trade unions, representing various different political tendencies, contested the elections.

A law for work councils in the mining industry was passed in June, 1920, being the first such law in Czechoslovakia. Councils were elected with tenures of two years. Elections to local mining councils were held at all mines with 20 employees or more. The condition to stand as a candidate was to be a Czechoslovak citizen aged 24 years or older, who had worked at the mine for minimum six months over the past 3 years. In order to vote in the election one had to be a Czechoslovak citizen aged 18 years or older, and having worked at least three months in the past 2 years. Each council had two advisers representing the management, one technical and one commercial.

== Results ==
=== Summary of 1928 election results ===
Per Dubský (1984), the elections held in 1928 yielded the following result across the country;

Union	Political affiliation	North Bohemia	Falkenov	Plzeň	Kladno	Žacléř	Ostrava	Rosice- Oslavany	Slovakia	Total
Mezinárodní všeodborový svaz – sekce horníků ('International All-Union League - Miners Section')	Communist	115	10	18	66	3	125	21	34	392
Svaz horníků v Československé republice ('Miners' Union of the Czechoslovak Republic')	Czechoslovak Social Democrat	56		34	27	1	130	42	79	369
Union der Bergarbeiter ('Union of Miners')	German Social Democrat (DSAP)	178	95	17		9	9			308
Národní sdružení odborových organizací ('National Association of Trade Union Organizations')	Czechoslovak National Democracy	12			12	1	50			75
Jednota horníků a hutníků ('Unity of Miners and Ironworkers')	Czechoslovak National Socialist	31		1	2	3	13			50
Sdružení československých horníků ('Association of Czechoslovak Miners')	Syndicalist	23			1		2			26
Deutschsozialistische Bergarbeiterverband ('German Socialist Miners' Union')	German National Socialist	22	3							25
Svaz křesťanských horníků a hutníků ('Union of Christian Miners and Ironworkers')	Czechoslovak People's Party			2	1		10	2	8	23
Others		14	18			3	2			37
Total		451	126	72	109	20	341	65	121	1,305

=== Results in 3 Bohemian districts 1924-1936 ===
Per Oellermann (2013), having slightly different estimates than Dubský, the work council elections in Northern Bohemia, Falkenov and Trautenau had the following composition;

==== Northern Bohemia ====
Union	Political affiliation	1924	1926	1929	1931	1933	1936
Union der Bergarbeiter ('Union of Miners')	German Social Democrat	204	188	180	162	123	132
Svaz horníků v Československé republice ('Miners' Union of the Czechoslovak Republic')	Czechoslovak Social Democrat	60	58	54	59	55	62
Sdružení československých horníků ('Association of Czechoslovak Miners')	Syndicalist	50	35	12			
Mezinárodní všeodborový svaz – sekce horníků ('International All-Union League - Miners Section')	Communist	86	97	113			
Průmyslový svaz horníků ('Industrial Miners' Union')	Communist				86	78	46
Jednota horníků a hutníků ('Unity of Miners and Ironworkers')	Czechoslovak National Socialist	30	30	31	44	39	35
Deutschsozialistische Bergarbeiterverband ('German Socialist Miners' Union')	German National Socialist	25	24	21	38	67	

==== Falkenov ====
Union	Political affiliation	1924	1926	1929	1931	1933	1936
Union der Bergarbeiter ('Union of Miners')	German Social Democrat	102	10	95	89	87	66
Svaz horníků v Československé republice ('Miners' Union of the Czechoslovak Republic')	Czechoslovak Social Democrat	4	2				
Mezinárodní všeodborový svaz – sekce horníků ('International All-Union League - Miners Section')	Communist	3	6	10			
Průmyslový svaz horníků ('Industrial Miners' Union')	Communist				5	8	6
Deutschsozialistische Bergarbeiterverband ('German Socialist Miners' Union')	German National Socialist			3	6	7	
Deutschen Arbeitergewerkschaft ('German Workers Trade Union')	Sudeten German Party						35
Fachverbandes der Berg- und Hüttenarbeiter u.v.B. „Solidarität“ ('Trade Union of Miners, Ironworkers and related professions "Solidarity"')		25	22	18	14	12	

==== Tratenau ====
Union	Political affiliation	1924	1926	1929	1931	1933	1936
Union der Bergarbeiter ('Union of Miners')	German Social Democrat	17	10	12	11	9	9
Svaz horníků v Československé republice ('Miners' Union of the Czechoslovak Republic')	Czechoslovak Social Democrat	1	1	1	1	1	1
Sdružení československých horníků ('Association of Czechoslovak Miners')	Syndicalist		4				
Mezinárodní všeodborový svaz – sekce horníků ('International All-Union League - Miners Section')	Communist	8	4	3			
Průmyslový svaz horníků ('Industrial Miners' Union')	Communist				1	2	4
Jednota horníků a hutníků ('Unity of Miners and Ironworkers')	Czechoslovak National Socialist		3	3	3	4	4
Deutschsozialistische Bergarbeiterverband ('German Socialist Miners' Union')	German National Socialist	2	5	4	5	5	
Národní sdružení ('National Association')	Czechoslovak National Democracy			1	4	4	
Verband der christlichen Berg. und Hüttenarbeiter ('Union of Christian Miners and Ironworkers')	German Christian-Social		2				5
Independents		3	3	3			3
