= Macoun (disambiguation) =

Macoun may refer to:

== People ==
- Jamie Macoun (born 1961), Canadian ice hockey player
- John Macoun (1831–1920), Irish-Canadian naturalist
- Franz Macoun (1881–1951), Czech-German politician

== Places in Canada ==
- Macoun, Saskatchewan, a village
- Macoun marsh

== Other ==
- Macoun apple, an apple cultivar
- Tulák Macoun, 1939 Czechoslovak film
- Limnanthes macounii or Macoun's meadowfoam
- Macoun Developers Conference, an Apple developer conference
