= Deutschsozialistische Bergarbeiterverband =

Nazi trade union for German miners in Czechoslovakia

Deutschsozialistische Bergarbeiterverband ('German Socialist Miners' Union') was a Nazi trade union for German miners in Czechoslovakia. It was founded in 1922. The union was based in Most. As of 1929, it claimed to have 3,371 members. The union was linked to the German National Socialist Workers Party (DNSAP). Heinrich Proste was the leader of the union. Deutschsozialistische Bergarbeiterverband was affiliated with the Reichsvereinigung der Deutschen Gewerkschaften ('National Association of German Trade Unions'). The union published the monthly Der deutscher Bergmann from Most between 1924 and 1933.

On 11 February 1928 Deutschsozialistische Bergarbeiterverband joined Svaz horníků, Sdružení československých horníků, Union der Bergarbeiter, Mezinárodní všeodborový svaz (miners' section) and Jednota československých horníků, in a joint call for a miners strike in Most District. The strikers demanded higher wages. The strike was called off after an agreement was reached with the employers.

In 1929 key unions broke away from the Reichvereinigung and founded the Verband deutscher Gewerkschaften. Deutschsozialistische Bergarbeiterverband joined the new trade union centre. At this point, the union claimed to have 4,200 members.

The Deutschsozialistische Bergarbeiterverband and the communist Red Trade Unions were the leading forces of the 1931 miners strike in Most. The strike was massive, and caught the attention of Adolf Hitler who reportedly ordered to send organizers to Most to capitalize politically from the strike movement.

At its peak, Deutschsozialistische Bergarbeiterverband had 78 local branches and by 1932 the union claimed to represent a majority of German miners in Czechoslovakia.

The union was banned in November 1933 along with its mother party and two other German National Socialist unions.
