= Union (Hungarian-German trade union council) =

Union was a central trade union organization of Hungarian and German workers in Slovakia. As of early 1920 Union claimed a membership of around 40,000 workers in southwestern Slovakia. Gyula Nagy, an important figure in the leftwing in Slovakia at the time, was the secretary of Union (as well as the Agricultural Labourers Union of Southwestern Slovakia and a parliamentarian of the Hungarian-German Social Democratic Party). Union had a strong presence amongst agricultural labourers. The organization was linked to the Hungarian-German Social Democratic Party.

The organization emerged after the end of the First World War as a continuation of the German-Hungarian Gewerkschaftskartell ('Trade Union Council'). A congress of Hungarian and German trade unions of the Bratislava region was held September 28–30, 1919. The foundation had initially been planned for March 21, 1919, but had been postponed with the intention to await the emergence of a better environment for cooperation with the Slovak trade unions. Ahead of the September 1919 congress, however, the Slovak Executive Committee of the Czechoslovak Trade Union Association had initially called upon its affiliates not to attend. The Czechoslovak Trade Union Association unions had been invited to the congress in order to discuss the possibilities for joint action. In the end the leadership of the Czechoslovak Social Democratic Labour Party intervened, and the Slovak Executive Committee of the Czechoslovak Trade Union Association withdrew its previous decision. Both the Czechoslovak Social Democratic Labour Party and the Czechoslovak Trade Union Association had representatives attending the founding congress of Union. The congress resolved that the goal of the organization would be to seek unity of the trade union movement in Slovakia on territorial basis within the Czechoslovak Trade Union Association. A special commission to examine the possibilities of a merger between Union and the Czechoslovak Trade Union Association was formed at the congress, with participants from both organizations. Union did however remain opposed to immediate unification with the Slovak trade unions, seeking a large degree of autonomy in the short term. Union applied for registration on October 25, 1919.

Union sent representatives to the Slovak congress of the Czechoslovak Trade Union Association held in Piešťany January 6–8, 1920. At the congress the Union representatives retained that they considered unification 'premature'.

On March 14, 1920, an extraordinary congress of Union was held in Žilina. The Czechoslovak Trade Union Association, the Czechoslovak Social Democratic Labour Party and the Bohemian German Gewerkschaftsbund sent representatives to the congress. At the Žilina congress, the leftist tendency had a strong presence. The congress was held with the intention of prevention factional conflicts between the communist and moderate wings of the movement.

Union held a congress on September 5, 1920, in Bratislava which called for unification with the Czechoslovak Trade Union Association 'on the platform of the Third International'. This move was rejected by the social democratic leaders of the Hungarian-German labour movement, though. Implementation was unrealistic anyway, as the communists remained a minority within the Czechoslovak Trade Union Association. Nevertheless, discussions on unification followed and by the end of September 1920 Union decided to merge into the Czechoslovak organization. The merger was effective in early 1921. Around 30,000 Hungarian and German workers joined the Slovak branch of the Czechoslovak Trade Union Association. However, many of them soon left as the communists formed a trade union centre of their own.

== Bibliography ==
- Pieter van Duin. Central European Crossroads: Social Democracy and National Revolution in Bratislava (Pressburg), 1867–1921. New York: Berghahn Books, 2009, ISBN 1-84545-395-6
