= OSC =

OSC may refer to:

== Organizations ==
- Odborové sdružení československé, the Czechoslovak Trade Union Association
- Office of Special Counsel (in the United States of America)
- Ohio Supercomputer Center, a computing research facility in Columbus
- Ontario Science Centre, a science museum in Toronto, Canada
- Ontario Securities Commission, a securities regulatory agency
- Open Source Center, a United States government center that provides analysis of open-source intelligence
- Orbital Sciences Corporation, a satellite-oriented company
- Order of Saint Clare, a Religious Order founded by Clare of Assisi whose members use the post-nominal letters O.S.C.
- Ordo Sanctae Crucis or Canons Regular of the Order of the Holy Cross, a Roman Catholic religious order commonly called Crosiers
- Orlando Science Center, a science-education establishment in Florida
- Overseas School of Colombo, a multinational English medium international school located in Colombo, Sri Lanka.

== Computing ==
- Open Sound Control, a music-oriented electronic communications protocol used in computers and multimedia devices
- openSUSE Command-line tool, a command-line tool used for openSUSE build service
- Orthogonal signal correction, a spectral preprocessing technique
- Operating system command, one of the C0 and C1 control codes
- Optical Signature Code, an industry standard format for LWIR signatures.

== Other uses ==
- Off-site construction, a mode of construction
- Orson Scott Card (born 1951), American speculative-fiction author
- Organic solar cell
- Oscoda–Wurtsmith Airport (IATA code: OSC), Michigan, United States
- Osceola (Amtrak station) (Amtrak station code: OSC), Iowa, United States
- Order to show cause
- Object show community, the fandom for the genre started by the animated web series Battle for Dream Island
