= Postage stamps and postal history of Czechoslovakia =

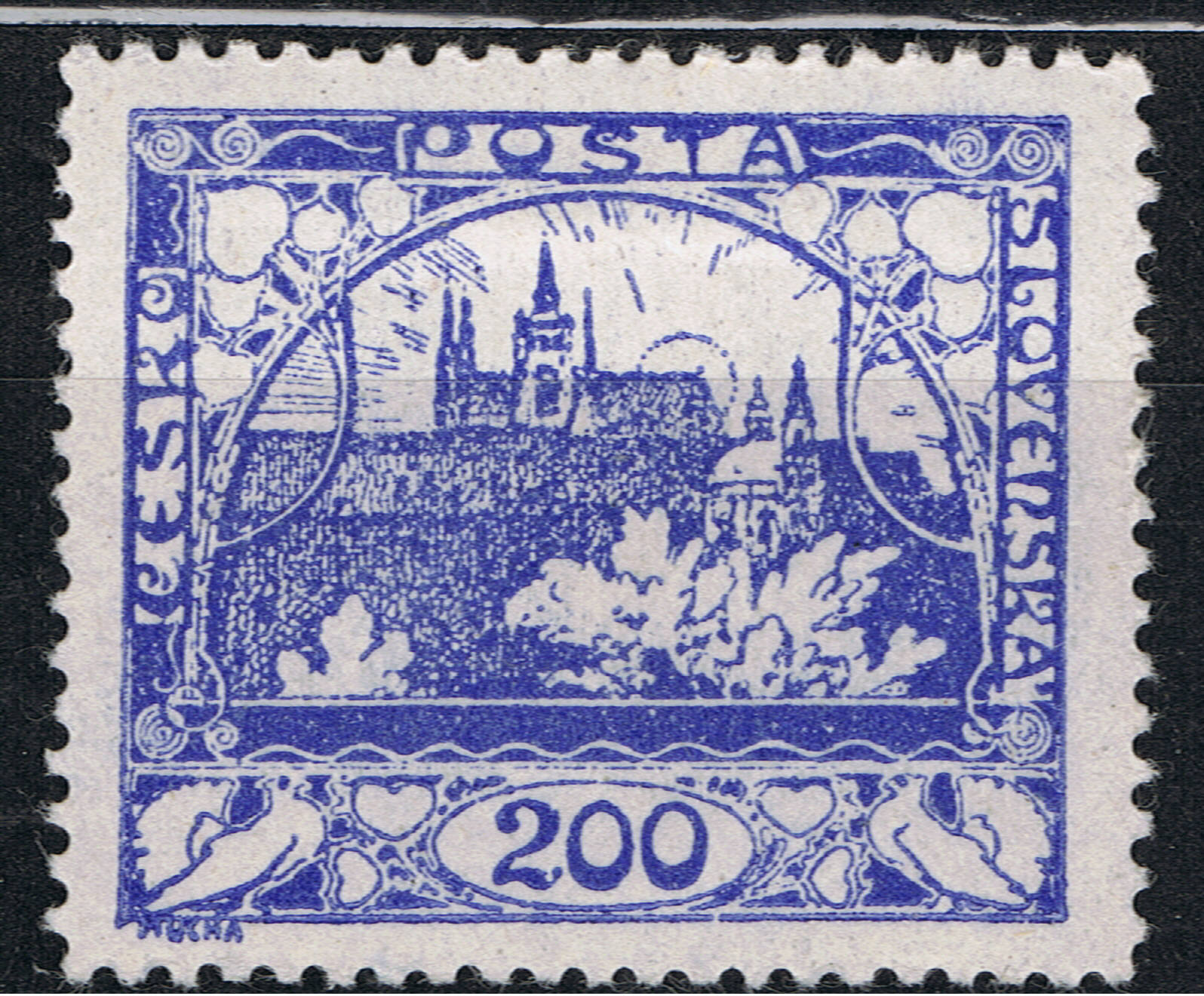
The Hradčany Castle series, issued in 1918

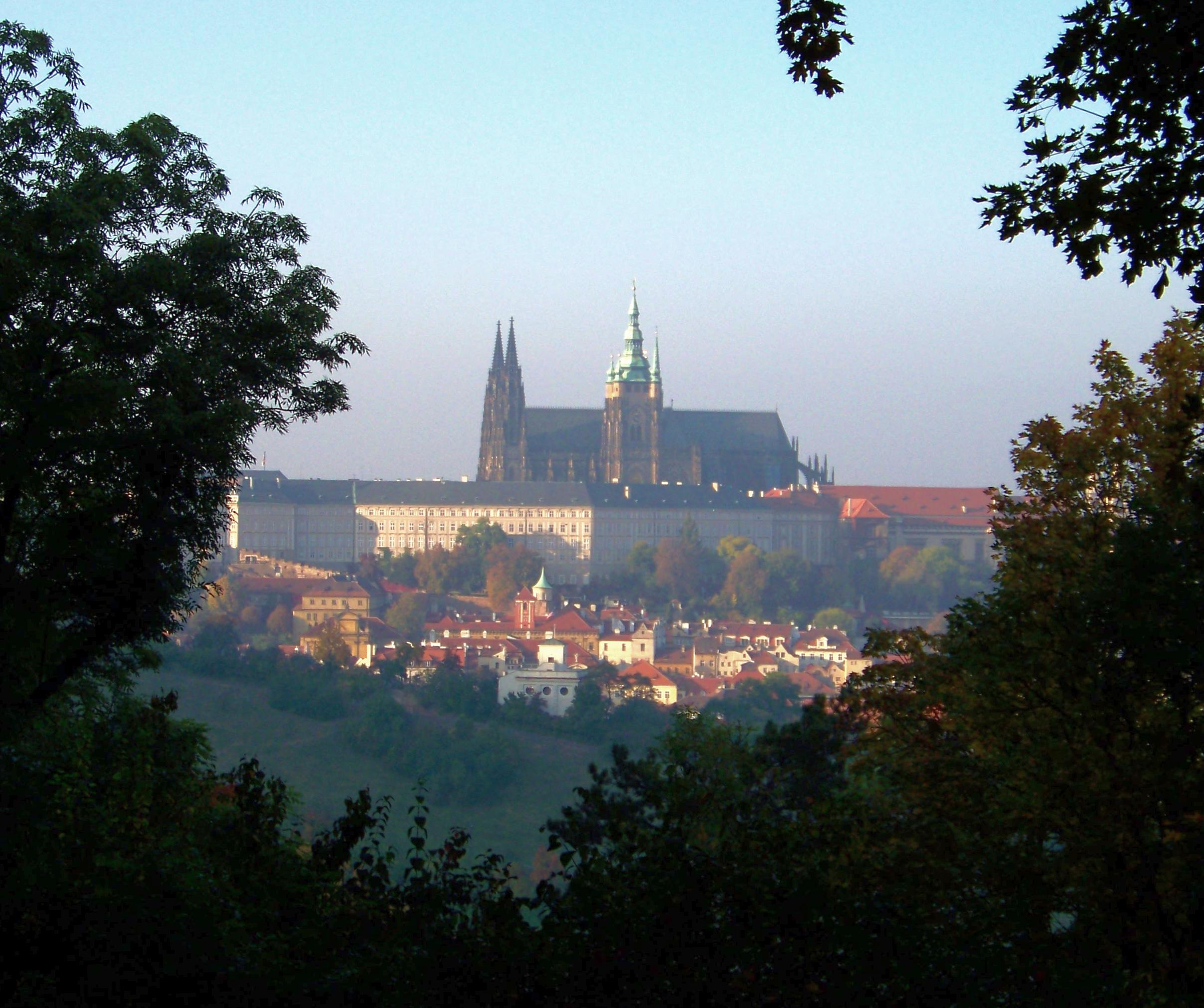
Hradčany Castle was the inspiration for the first stamp issues.

This is a survey of the postage stamps and postal history of Czechoslovakia.

Czechoslovakia was a country in Central Europe which existed from October 1918, when it declared its independence from the Austro-Hungarian Empire, until 1992. From 1939 to 1945 the state did not have de facto existence, due to its forced division and partial incorporation into Nazi Germany, but the Czechoslovak government-in-exile nevertheless continued to exist during this time period. On 1 January 1993 Czechoslovakia peacefully split into the Czech Republic and Slovakia.

== Austria-Hungary ==
Before the establishment of the Czechoslovak Republic, stamps of the Austro-Hungarian Empire were used and remained valid until 15 March 1919.

== First Republic ==
=== Stamps ===
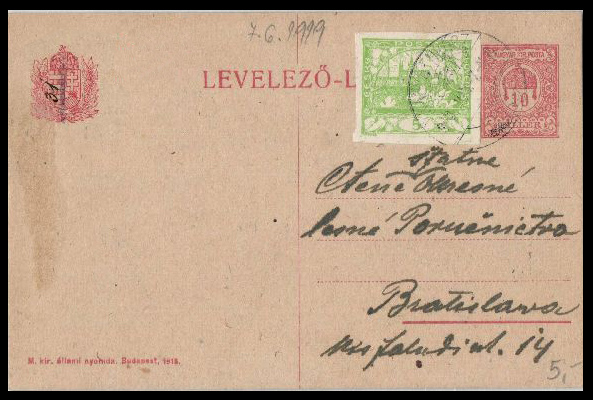
5-heller Hradčany stamp used in 1919 to uprate a Hungarian postal stationery postcard

The first stamps were issued in October 1918. The Hradčany Castle stamps illustrate the castle in Prague with the sun symbolically rising behind it is synonymous with the birth of the new state though the sun does not actually rise behind the castle. The stamps, designed by graphic designer Alphonse Mucha, an exponent of Art Nouveau living in Prague, was chosen from the more than ten submitted designs. Mucha's reason for choosing the castle motif was because:

Every nation has a palladium of its own embodying past and future history. Ever since my boyhood I felt and saw in the architectural lines of St. Vitus Cathedral built so close to the castle, a powerful interpretation of our national symbol. I could, therefore, select no other subject for my design then Hradčany Castle and the surrounding architecture of the Middle Ages.

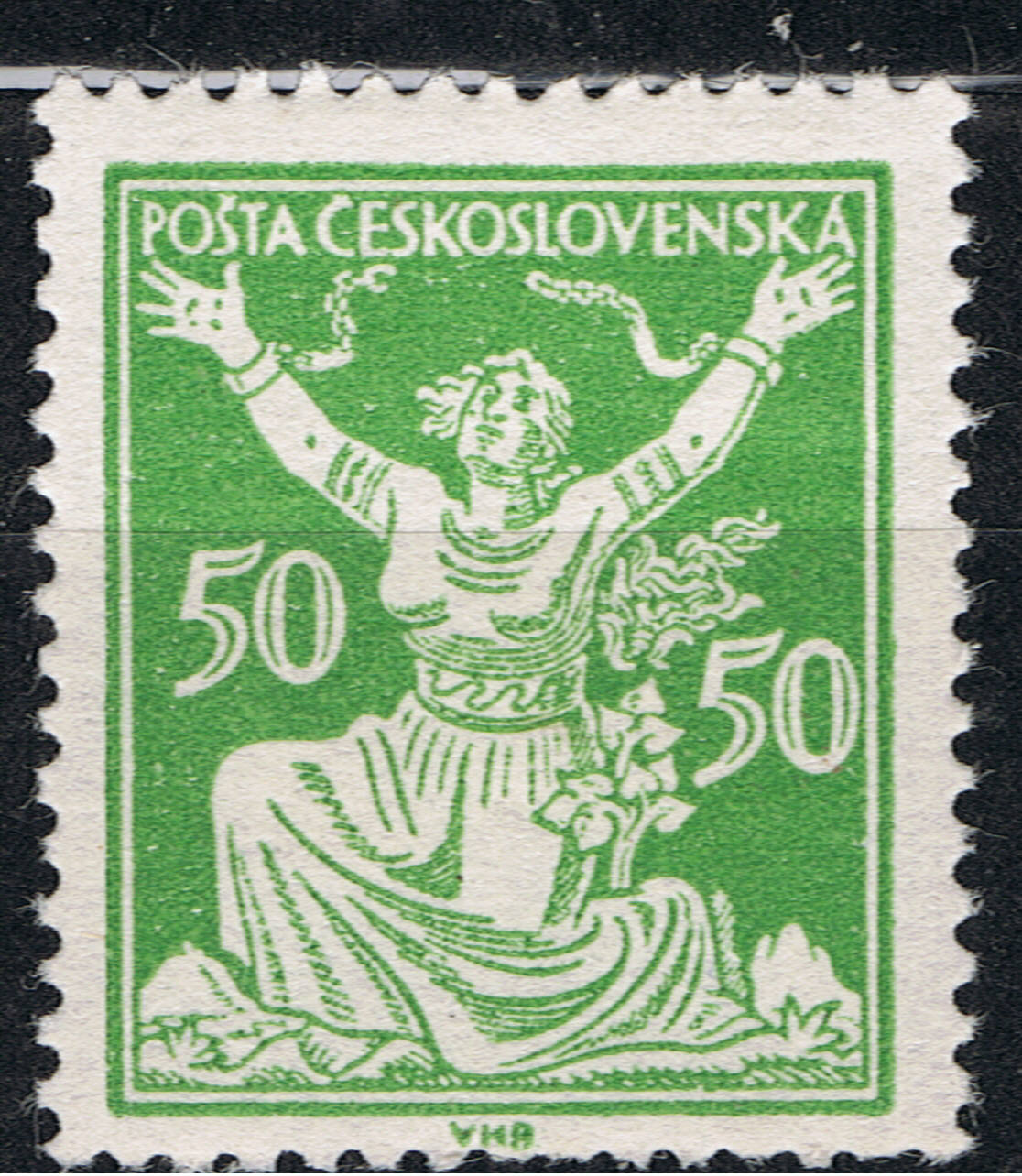
1920 50-heller Chainbreaker stamp

The issue comes in two distinct sets with fifty-three different stamps that can be classified by five different types. The words Pošta Česko-Slovenská are arranged around the two sides and top of the first set while on the second set Česko-Slovenská is in one line under the main castle design. The different types show slight variations in the design but several errors exist that include plate faults and flaws as well as different printing plates. Fewer variations exist in succeeding issues because the Ministry of Posts' designers, engravers and print mills improved their skills with experience.

The first of several stamps illustrate Thomas Masaryk, the country's first president, followed in 1920 with three denominations of 125h, 500h and 1000h designed by Max Švabinský. That year also saw two allegorical sets issued showing a stylised carrier pigeon in six values and referred to by some as Dove stamps, and the ten denominations of The Chainbreaker, symbolising the country, shows a woman breaking free from the chain of bondage. Both these sets also exist in tete-beche pairs due to a booklet printing plate layout proposed by a private company who were going to use the gutter for advertising as well as pay the printing costs, however, even though the stamps had been printed, the booklet deal never happened.

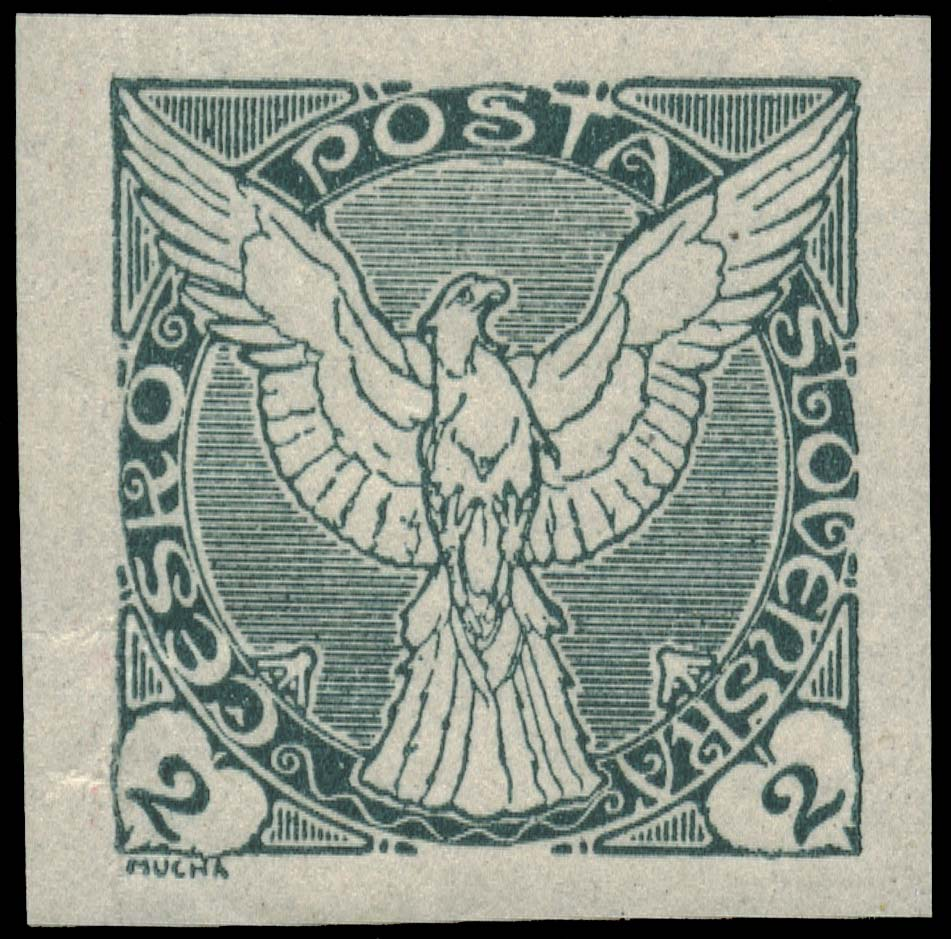
2-heller newspaper stamp

=== Newspaper stamps ===
At the same time as the Hradčany Castle stamps were issued in 1918, two newspaper stamps in 2h and 10h denominations, also designed by Alphonse Mucha were released. More values were added over time; 6h, 20h and 30h in 1919 and 5h, 50h and 100h in 1920. A few design variations and varieties exist. The 5h value, first released in September 1920 holds the record for the largest number of stamps printed being 3.6 billion. These stamps were also overprinted for use in East Silesia in 1920 and for a discounted commercial printed matter rate in 1934 and a 2h was overprinted 5h to supplement the supply of that denomination.

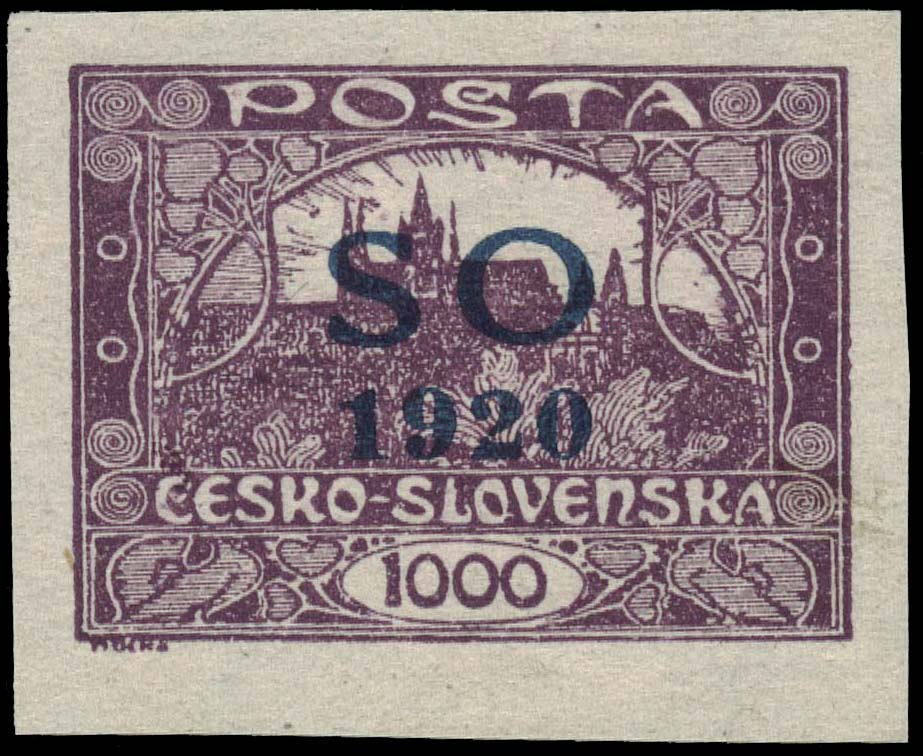
Overprinted Czechoslovak stamp for use in East Silesia

=== East Silesia ===
In 1920, Czechoslovak stamps overprinted S O 1920 and Polish stamps overprinted S.O. 1920 were issued for use in Cieszyn Silesia, an area disputed between Czechoslovakia and Poland.

=== Military post ===
In 1919 and 1920 the Czechoslovak Army in Siberia issued stamps for military posts and use on the Siberian Railway.

== World War II ==
A German Protectorate was established over Bohemia and Moravia, the Czech areas of Czechoslovakia, between 1939 and 1945 following the German occupation of Czechoslovakia. Over 100 stamps were issued including definitive and commemorative issues, charity stamps, newspaper stamps and official stamps.

== Post war ==
After World War II, Czechoslovakia was re-established and regular issues of Czechoslovakia resumed in 1945.

=== Last stamps ===
The last stamp of Czechoslovakia was issued on 18 December 1992 and marked Stamp Day. Although the Czech Republic and Slovakia officially separated on 1 January 1993, the stamps of Czechoslovakia continued to be valid for the payment of postage in both countries until the end of July 1993.

== See also ==
- Postage stamps and postal history of the Czech Republic
- Postage stamps and postal history of Slovakia
- Gewerkschaft der Postler
- Society for Czechoslovak Philately
