= Austrian Construction Union =

Construction union

The Austrian Construction Union (German: Österreichische Baugewerkschaft) was a trade union representing building workers in Austria.

The union was founded in 1916 as the Central Association of Construction Workers, when the Central Union of Austrian Builders merged with the Austrian Association of Builders' Labourers. It affiliated to the Reichsgewerkschaftskommission. From 1918, many other trade unions in the industry affiliated:

- Austrian National Association of House Painters, Varnishers and Related Trades
- Austrian Union of Plasterers, Related Professions and Assistants
- Austrian Union of Roofers
- Austrian Union of Stone Workers
- German-Austrian Polishers' Union
- Union of All Ceramic Workers
- Union of Carpenters and Assistants

In 1923, the union was renamed as the "Austrian Construction Union". It later absorbed the Austrian Union of Chimney Sweeps, and part of the Austrian Union of Glass Workers. From 1928, it was affiliated to the new Federation of Free Trade Unions in Austria.

From 1929, the union was led by president Johann Böhm. It was banned in 1934, but continued in Prague. There, it merged with the Austrian Union of Woodworkers, to form the Austrian Union of Construction and Woodworkers.
