= Society for Czechoslovak Philately =

- Founded: 1939
- Founder: Joe Lowey and Joe Stein (New York City)
- Type: not-for-profit organization
- Purpose: postage stamps and postal history of Czechoslovakia, the Czech Republic and Slovakia
- Location: USA
- Origins: originally, the Czechoslovak Philatelic Society
- Region served: Worldwide (all countries)
- Method: worldwide membership
- Key people: Lou Svoboda, President (Aurora, Colorado)
- Revenue: Membership fees
- Website: www.csphilately.org
- The Czechoslovak Specialist, the society's journal is published quarterly.

Society for Czechoslovak Philately (SCP) is a philatelic organization dedicated to the collection and study of the postage stamps and postal history of Czechoslovakia, the Czech Republic and Slovakia.

== History ==
The society was founded in 1939 and was intended to draw attention to the importance of Czechoslovak philately by attracting and serving the beginning stamp collector as well as the advanced specialist of Czechoslovak philately and postal history. The society was founded as the Czechoslovak Philatelic Society, but later was renamed the Society for Czechoslovak Philately. It currently serves collectors of Czechoslovak philately in thirty five American states and seventeen other countries.

== Membership ==
The SCP offers membership at four levels: regular, patron, honorary, and youth. Membership may be obtained by applying at the SCP website.

== Services ==
Among other services, the SCP offers a sales circuit where members may purchase stamps or sell off their duplicates, an expertization service for Czechoslovak stamps, and a library of philatelic books in various languages.

== Publications ==
The society journal is The Czechoslovak Specialist, which has been published continually since the inception of the society in 1939. The journal is published quarterly, and an index of previous articles is available.

== Philatelic exhibitions ==
Traditionally an annual meeting, connected with a major philatelic exhibition, is held by the society yearly in the United States. In 1998, the society held its first formal meeting outside the United States in Prague at the PRAGA 98 philatelic exhibition.

== Organization ==
The SCP is governed by a set of bylaws. Administration of the society is provided by an elected group of personnel, consisting of: President, vice-president, Secretary, and Treasurer. The president is entitled to name offices of editor, librarian, American Philatelic Society Representative, circuit manager, auditing chairman, and such other committee chairpersons and staff members as needed.

== See also ==
- Postage stamps and postal history of Czechoslovakia
- Deutschsozialistische Bergarbeiterverband
- Postage stamps and postal history of the Czech Republic
- Postage stamps and postal history of Slovakia
