= Chemical Workers' Union (Czechoslovakia) =

- Merged into: Mezinárodní všeodborový svaz (MVS)
- Dissolved: October 1922
- Location: Czechoslovakia
- Members: 76,978 (1921)
- Key people: Josef Hais, Karel Piták
- Affiliations: Odborové sdružení československé (OSČ), Red International of Labour Unions

The Chemical Workers' Union was a trade union in the Czechoslovakia. The union was led by Josef Hais. The union published Dělnik ('Worker'). Dissolved in 1922, the Chemical Workers' Union had a membership of 76,978, as of 1921.

The Chemical Workers' Union was affiliated with the Odborové sdružení československé (OSČ). However, within OSČ the Chemical Workers' Union represented a leftist position. Hais upled the line of 'non-compromising socialism'. Overall, the chemical industry workers were amongst the lowest paid workers in Czechoslovakia at the time, a fact that contributed to the radicalization of their union.

The OSČ rightwing branded Hais as a 'communist', and in February 1921 a rightist splinter union was formed under the leadership of Karel Piták.

In June 1922, communist trade unionists were expelled from the Metalworkers' Union (a union which was firmly controlled by Social Democrats). They then formed the 'Opposition Committee of Metalworkers'. The Opposition Committee was provisionally accepted into the Chemical Workers' Union.

On 25 June 1922, a conference of revolutionary trade unionists was held in Brno. The conference staked out plans for a new trade union centre. At the conference an 'Agitation Committee for the Red International of Labour Unions' was formed, with Josef Hais as its secretary. In July 1922 the board of the Chemical Workers' Union decided that the union would join the new trade union centre once it was formed. On 13 July 1922, the Chemical Workers' Union was expelled from OSČ.

When the new, pro-communist trade union centre Mezinárodní všeodborový svaz (MVS) was formed in October 1922, the Chemical Workers' Union merged into it as its Chemical workers' section. At the time of the merger, 45,068 workers of the Chemical Workers' Union joined MVS.
