= Sibel Arslan =

Swiss lawyer and politician

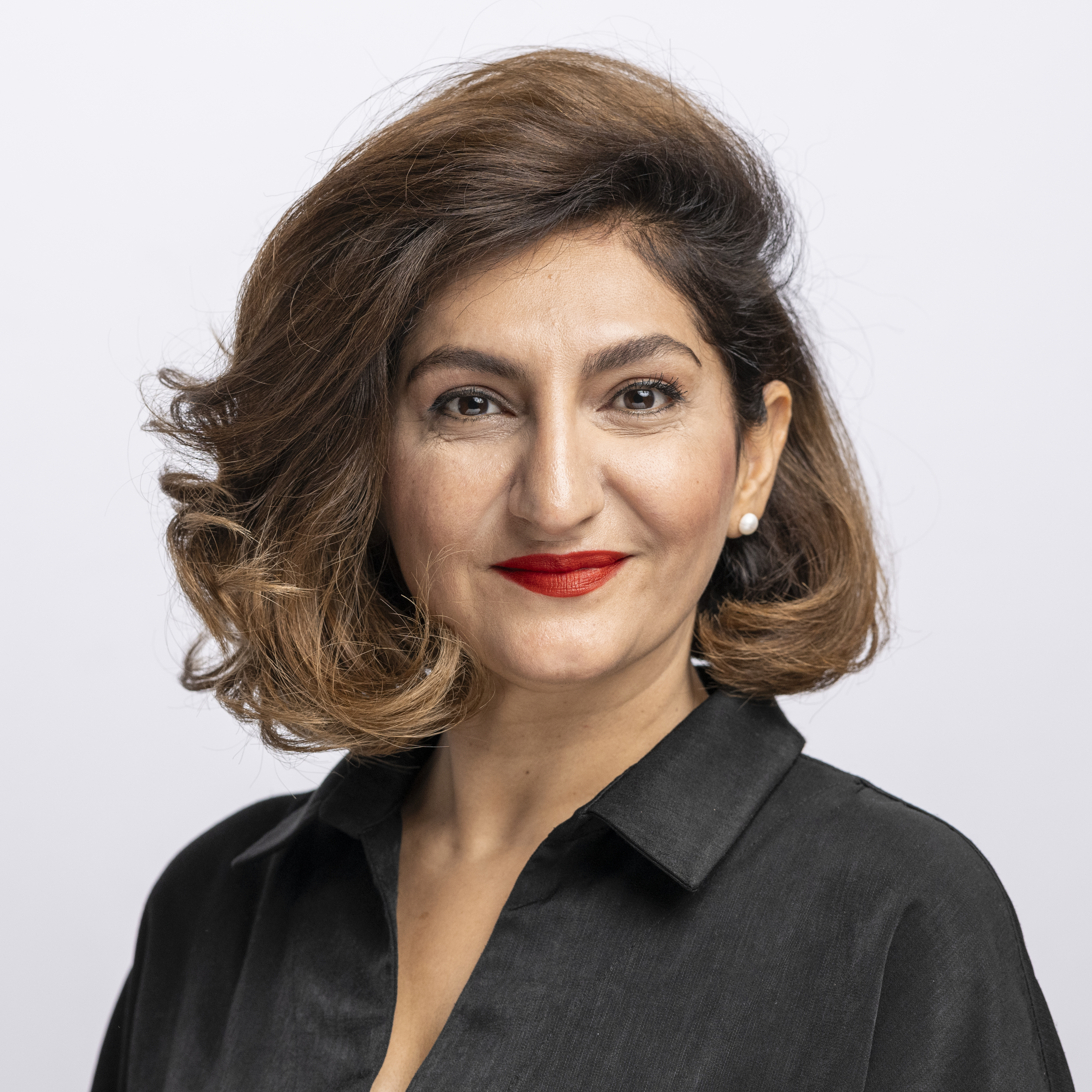
- Official portrait, 2023

Member of the National Council (Switzerland)
- Incumbent
- Assumed office 30 November 2015
- Constituency: Canton of Basel-Stadt

Member of the Grand Council of Basel-Stadt
- In office 2005–2016

Personal details
- Born: Sibel Arslan; 23 June 1980 (age 46) Erzincan, Turkey
- Party: Green Party of Switzerland
- Occupation: Lawyer, politician
- Website: Official website

Sibel Arslan (Turkish pronunciation: [sibel aɾslaŋ]; born 23 June 1980) is a Turkish-born Swiss lawyer and politician who currently serves on the National Council (Switzerland) for the Green Party. There she concurrently also is a representative to the Parliamentary Assembly of the Council of Europe since 2020. She previously served on the Grand Council of Basel-Stadt between 2005 and 2016.

== Early life and education ==
Sibel Arslan is of Kurdish Alevi origin from Erzincan, and arrived in Switzerland in 1991 with her mother and two brothers. Her father had already arrived six years previously as a refugee. The family settled in Basel. In 2002, she graduated from the Gymnasium Bäumlihof in Basel. She studied law at the University of Basel.

== Professional career ==
Along with her brother, Arslan managed the shisha bar 'Susam' in Barfüsserplatz from 2006 to 2007. Arslan has been working as a legal advisor to the Basel Gewerkschaftsbund since 2012. From 2013 to 2015 she was a career adviser at the Office for Counseling and Adult Protection of the Canton of Basel-Stadt. Since March 2015, she has worked as a lawyer in the General Secretariat of the Security Directorate of the Canton of Basel-Landschaft.

== Political career ==
Arslan joined BastA! in 2004, a leftist ecological party in the canton of Basel-Stadt, and left in 2026. BastA is a member of the Green Party of Switzerland. From 2005 to 2016, she sat in the Grand Council of Basel-Stadt. In 2007, she became a member of the Justice, Safety and Sports Commission and, from 2013, the Pardon Commission.

At the end of 2014 the Cantonal Regierungsrat (Executive Councilor) of Basel Landschaft, Security Director Isaac Reber revoked an agreed appointment of Arslan as head of the cantonal penal sanctions and measures committee after the Basler Zeitung had led a campaign against her. The newspaper had alleged lack of qualifications and debts of about 60,000 Swiss francs. These claims covered three agreements that Arslan had also mentioned in the application process. The fact that these claims were recorded in the debt collection register "was not clarified in all media reports". At the time of Arslan's application, only a residual debt of CHF 5,000 had to be paid. This happened within a short time.

Arslan was elected to the National Council in the 2015 Swiss federal election. On 30 November 2015 she took the oath of office. The ceremony was held in Bern. In Parliament she joined the fraction of the Green Party of Switzerland and is a member of the Foreign Policy Commission and the Legal Commission. In 2019 and 2023 she was re-elected to the National Council.

== Political positions ==
She is a defender of women rights and was shortly detained after she participated in the Swiss Women's Strike 2020 and supports same-sex marriage. Besides, she is a member of the Swiss Association of Foreign Policy.

== Personal life ==
In 2004 she became a Swiss citizen and is a Turkish and Swiss dual citizen.
