= Chemical Workers' Union =

Chemical Workers' Union may refer to:

- Chemical Workers' Union (Austria)
- Chemical Workers' Union (Czechoslovakia)
- Chemical Workers' Union (Finland)
- Chemical Workers' Union (United Kingdom)
