= Oldřich Kulhánek =

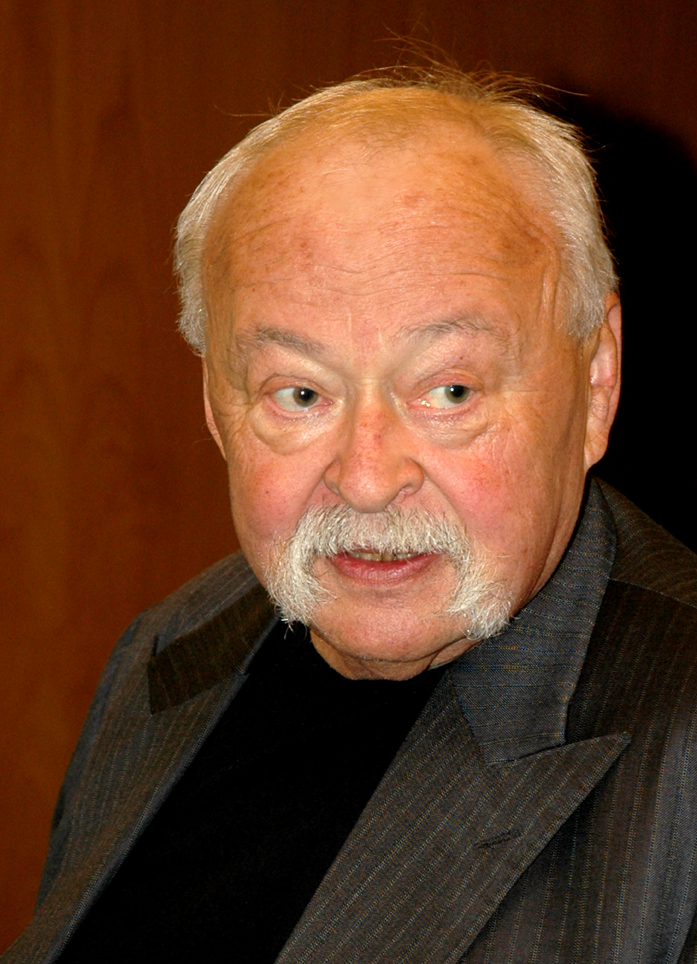
- (Portrait by Jindrich Nosek)
- Born: 26 February 1940; Prague, Protectorate of Bohemia and Moravia
- Died: 28 January 2013 (aged 72); Prague, Czech Republic
- Education: Academy of Arts, Architecture and Design in Prague
- Occupations: Painter, graphic designer, illustrator, stage designer and pedagogue
- Organization: Association of Czech Graphic Artists Hollar
- Known for: Designing the current Czech banknotes and postage stamps

Oldřich Kulhánek (26 February 1940 – 28 January 2013) was a Czech painter, graphic designer, illustrator, stage designer and pedagogue. Kulhánek created the design for the current Czech banknotes and postage stamps.

== Life and career ==
Kulhánek was born in Prague. Beginning in 1958, he studied at the Academy of Arts, Architecture and Design in Prague, in the atelier of Karel Svolinský. He graduated in 1964, with the cycles of illustrations to the poetry of Vladimír Holan (Sen, (in English: Dream)) and Christian Morgenstern (The Gallows Songs).

In 1971 he was arrested by the StB (the Czechoslovak Secret Police) and imprisoned for "defamation of the allied socialist states". In a graphic cycle created from 1968 to 1971, he included "a distorted portrait of Joseph Stalin, perforated five-pointed red stars or joyful faces of socialist workers turned into a hideous grin". The graphics were identified as "ideologically dangerous" and condemned to destruction. Kulhánek spent a month in prison and was interrogated regularly for next two years. He was prohibited from publishing.

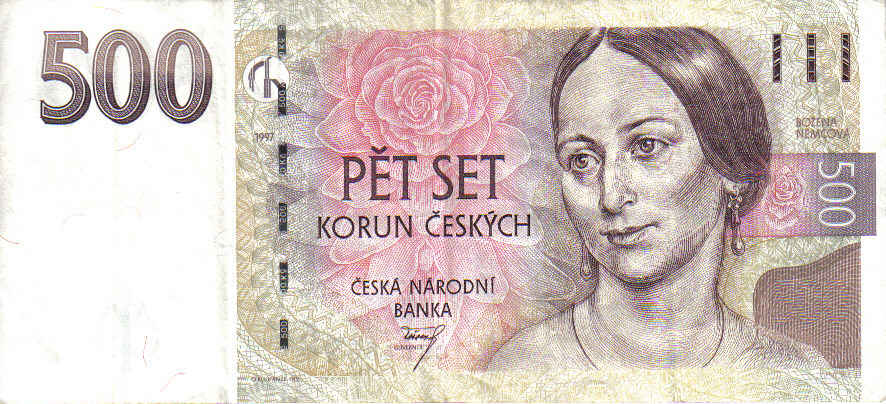
500 Czech crowns banknote, designed by Kulhánek.

In the 1980s, he created lithographs inspired by the development of the human body. Following the Velvet Revolution, he visited the United States and attended the Lithographic Workshop in Los Angeles. He also often travelled to Belgium, to study the works of old masters.

He was a member of the Association of Czech Graphic Artists Hollar. His works are in the collections of notable European and US art galleries, such as The Library of Congress (Washington, USA), Centre Georges Pompidou (Paris, France), Albertina (Vienna, Austria), Kupferstichkabinett (Dresden, Germany), Art Institute of Chicago (Chicago, USA), Stedelijk Museum (Amsterdam, Netherlands), Folkwang Museum (Essen, Germany), and the Musée d'Art et d'Histoire (Geneva, Switzerland).

Kulhánek died suddenly in Prague on 28 January 2013 at the age of 72. One of his last graphic works was inspired by the Biblical story of Job.

== Selected bibliography ==
- Petrová, Eva (1997). Oldřich Kulhánek: kresby a grafiky 1964-1996. Prague: Akropolis. ISBN 9788085770476.
- Oldřich Kulhánek - Exlibris. G-DESIGN CZ. 2010. ISBN 978-80-904701-0-1.
- Oldřich Kulhánek - Známková tvorba. G-DESIGN CZ. 2012.
