= Miners' Union in the Czechoslovak Republic =

Svaz horníků v Československé republice
- Miners' Union in the Czechoslovak Republic
- Founded: October, 1910
- Dissolved: March, 1939
- Location: Czechoslovakia
- Members: 23,382 (1937)
- Key people: Karel Brožík, general secretary
- Affiliations: Odborové sdružení českoslovanské

Miners' Union in the Czechoslovak Republic (Czech: Svaz horníků v Československé republice) was a miners trade union in the Czech Lands (then part of Austria-Hungary) and later Czechoslovakia, affiliated to Odborové sdružení českoslovanské (OSČ).

The union published a weekly newspaper, Na Zdar.

== History ==
Svaz českých horníků ('Union of Czech Miners') was founded in October 1910, through a split from the Austrian Miners' Union (which was affiliated with the Imperial Trade Union Commission).

The union was drastically affected during World War I. Since the mining industry was crucial for the war effort, strikes were banned. Striking or protesting workers could be sent either to the battle-front or to jail. However, the Union of Czech Miners was one of the OSČ unions that expanded rapidly in the period 1917–1918. Membership in the union rose from 1,189 in 1917 to 7,875 one year later.

In 1918, the name was changed to Svaz horníků v Československé republice ('Miners' Union in the Czechoslovak Republic'). In 1920, the Miners' Union was the second largest affiliate of OSČ, with 84,895 members.

=== Split ===
The 1921–1922 split in the OSČ, when many communist trade unionists either were expelled or withdrew from the centre to form the parallel Mezinárodní všeodborový svaz (MVS), affected the Miners' Union somewhat differently from other unions. The Miners' Union did not see any immediate split, but much tension between communists and Social Democrats. All sides did however, at an initial stage, value the unity of union. Whilst there had been calls from MVS for miners to join the new centre, such appeals did not have the support of the Communist Party (who instead sought to consolidate their strength inside the Miners' Union). A smaller group of coalminers from Northern Bohemia joined the MVS-affiliated Chemical Workers' Union. The mining areas of Kladno were a communist stronghold. In the Ostrava-Karviná coalfields, three separate branches had been formed, one at Moravská Ostrava, one Polish branch at Karviná and one communist-dominated branch at Orlov.

At the time, the general secretary of the Miners' Union was the Social Democratic MP Karel Brožík.

Between August 20, 1923 and October 6, 1923, a miners strike was launched. The strike ended unsuccessfully, as the Miners' Union in the end accepted cuts in salaries between 9 and 13%. The communists opposed the deal, and the division inside the union became fierce. The communists broke away, and took approximately 10,000 miners with them into the MVS.
