= Reichsvereinigung der Deutschen Gewerkschaften =

Reichsvereinigung der Deutschen Gewerkschaften ('National Association of German Trade Unions') was a trade union centre in the First Czechoslovak Republic. The organization had its headquarters on Krakovská street 11 in Prague. Initially the Reichsvereinigung grouped all the main German nationalist, or völkisch, trade unions in the Sudetenland. As of 1921, the affiliates of the Reichsvereinigung claimed to have 49,500 members. By the end of 1928, the organization claimed to have 51,500 members. The Reichsvereinigung was a supposedly apolitical body for German workers.

In 1929 the Reichsvereinigung suffered a split, as eight unions (Gewerkschaftsverband deutscher Arbeiter, Deutschsozialistische Bergarbeiterverband, Deutscher Handels- und Industrieangestellen-Verband, Gewerkschaft deutscher Eisenbahner, and smaller unions) broke away from the Reichsvereinigung and founded the rival Verband deutscher Gewerkschaften. The split had simmered for some time, as sectors the dissident sectors of the Reichsvereinigung wanted a more explicitly Nazi political direction. After the split, the strength of Reichsvereinigung was curtailed. By 1929 the remaining Reichvereinigung affiliates had only 12,800 members.

Affiliates of Reichsvereinigung following the split included;

Union	Membership	Headquarter
Gewerkschaft der Angestellten ('Trade Union of Employees')	4,272	Gablonz
Verband des ärztlichen Hilfspersonals und verwandter Berufe ('Union of Medical Aid Staff and Related Professions')	240	Opava
Verein deutscher Eisenbahnbeamten ('Association of German Railway Employees')	2,518	Prague
Zentralverband d . deutschen Güterbeamten und Angestellten f. d. Cs. Rep. ('Central Union of German Freight Officials and Employees in the Czechoslovak Republic')	4,138	Teplice-Šanov
Gewerkschaft deutscher Angestellten der Selbstverwaltungskörper ('Trade Union of German Employees of Self-Administration Bodies')	1,300	Karlovy Vary
Verein der deutschen städt. Beamten ('Association of German State Employees')	292	Brno
Total	12,760	

However, the Reichsvereinigung managed to recover. At the end of 1936, however, it comprised eight organizations with 42,100 members and by the end of 1937 it had nine affiliated unions with a total of 60,700 members. The resurgence of the Reichsvereinigung was mainly attributed to the new union Deutsche Arbeitergewerkschaft (D.A.G.), formed by former members of the banned Gewerkschaftsverband deutscher Arbeiter. D.A.G. had 24,500 by the end of 1936, 43,700 members by the end of 1937 and as of August 1938 it claimed a membership of around 70,000. The Reichsvereinigung supported the Sudetendeutsche Volkshilfe ('Sudeten German People's Aid').
