= Verband deutscher Gewerkschaften =

Verband deutscher Gewerkschaften ('League of German Trade Unions') was a German Nazi trade union centre in Czechoslovakia. The organization was formed in 1929, by eight unions that broke away from the Reichsvereinigung der deutscher Gewerkschaften. At the time of the founding of Verband deutscher Gewerkschaften, its affiliates claimed a combined membership of 46,700. The organization had its headquarters in Ústí nad Labem.

== Affiliated unions ==
| Union | Membership (1930) | Headquarter |
|---|---|---|
| Gewerkschaftsverband deutscher Arbeiter ('Trade Union of German Workers') | 16,200 | Ústí nad Labem |
| Gewerkschaft deutscher Eisenbahner ('Trade Union of German Railwaymen') | 5,551 | Ústí nad Labem |
| Deutschsozialistische Bergarbeiterverband ('German Socialist Miners' Union') | 4,200 | Most |
| Deutscher Handels- und Industrieangestellen-Verband ('Union of German Trade and Industry Employees') | 21,500 | Ústí nad Labem |
| Gewerkschaftsverband deutscher Tabakarbeiter und Arbeiterinnen ('Trade Union of German Tobacco Workers') | 600 | Lanškroun |
| Verband deutscher weiblicher Angestellter ('Union of German Female Employees') | 2,000 | Ústí nad Labem |
| Reichsverband deutscher Zahntechnikergehilfen ('National Union of German Dental Technician Assistants') | 1,500 | Liberec |
| Verband der tschechoslowakischen Lotsen auf der Flusstrecke Prag bis zur Statsgrenze ('Union of Czechoslovak Pilots on the River Route Prague to the State Border') | 64 | Ústí nad Labem |
| Total | 51,615 | Ústí nad Labem |

== Leadership ==
The key leaders of the organization were Friedrich Ritter, Rudolf Kasper, Eduard Tischler, Greta Hummelová and Eduard Wenzel (treasurer).

== Growth and fall ==
At its peak, the organization claimed to have around 120,000 members. However, in November 1933 the German National Socialist Workers Party (DNSAP) and the three most important affiliates of the Verband deutscher Gewerkschaften (Gewerkschaftsverband deutscher Arbeiter, Gewerkschaft deutscher Eisenbahner and Deutschsozialistische Bergarbeiterverband) were banned. Verband deutscher Gewerkschaften collapsed soon thereafter.
