= Gewerkschaftsbund =

Social Democratic trade union center in Czechoslovakia

- Central Commission of German Trade Unions in the Czechoslovak Republic
- Zentralgewerkschaftskommission des Deutschen Gewerkschaftsbundes in der Tschechoslowakischen Republik
- Founded: July 1919
- Dissolved: March 1939
- Headquarters: Gablonzstraße 20, Liberec
- Location: Czechoslovakia
- Members: 372,027 (1921)
- Key people: Franz Macoun, General Secretary
- Affiliations: International Federation of Trade Unions

Zentralgewerkschaftskommission des Deutschen Gewerkschaftsbundes in der Tschechoslowakischen Republik ('Central Commission of German Trade Unions in the Czechoslovak Republic') was a German Social Democratic trade union centre in Czechoslovakia. From 1927 onwards, it was an autonomous structure inside the Czechoslovak labour centre OSČ. The organization was dissolved as Czechoslovakia fell under German occupation.

== Early period ==
The organization was founded in July 1919. In 1920 the name Gewerkschaftsbund was adopted, and a headquarters was set up in Liberec. Gewerkschaftsbund emerged as a prominent force in the amongst labour movements in Czechoslovakia, having around 75% of unionized German workers as its members in 1921 (at the time Czechoslovakia had a general unionizing rate of 50%, one of the higher in Europe). Major unions affiliated to Gewerkschaftsbund were Textile Workers (90,878 members in 1921), Metalworkers (39,209 members in 1921) and Miners (37,582 members in 1921).

In 1922, Czechoslovak communists had formed a separate trade union centre, Mezinárodní všeodborový svaz (MVS). However, not all communist trade unionists joined MVS. As of 1926, there were around 15 000 communists inside the Gewerkschaftsbund affiliates.

== Merger into OSČ ==
In 1927 Gewerkschaftsbund merged into the main Czechoslovak trade union centre, the Social Democratic Odborové sdružení československé (OSČ). The organization continued to function as an autonomous body inside OSČ until the unions were banned following the German occupation.

== Leadership ==
Franz Macoun was the general secretary of the organization from 1920 to 1938. Macoun was a Member of Parliament for the German Social Democratic Workers Party between 1929 and 1938.

== Publications ==
The organization issued the publication Gewerkschafts-Jugend ('Trade Union Youth') between 1934-1937.

== Membership ==
Year	Membership
1919	299,091
1920	403,211
1921	372,027
1927	200,183
1933	220,050
1937	206,474

== Membership of Gewerkschaftsbund affiliates in 1937 ==
Union	Membership
Union der Textilarbeiter b. G. fuer das Tschechoslowakische Staatsgebiet	50,139
Internationaler Metallarbeiterverband in der Tschechoslowakischen Republik	27,553
Allgemeiner Angestellten-Verband	23,413
Verband der Eisenbahner in der Tschechoslowakischen Republik	16,219
Verband der Glas- und Keramarbeiter und -Arbeiterinnen der Tschechoslowakischen Republik	15,219
Union der Bergarbeiter in der Tschechoslowakischen Republik	13,853
Fabrikarbeiterverband in der Tschechoslowakischen Republik	11,235
Verband der Holz- und Landarbeiter in der Tschechoslowakischen Republik	11,090
Verband der oeffentlichen Angestellten	11,053
Verband der Transport- und Lebensmittelarbeiter	78,58
Bekleidungsarbeiterverband in der Tschechoslowakischen Republik	6,681
Gewerkschaft der Postler	4,590
Gewerkschaft der Tabakarbeiterinnen und -Arbeiter in der Tschechoslowakischen Republik	3,549
Graphische Union	2,179
Buehnenbund in der Tschechoslowakischen Republik	1,054
Deutscher Musiker-Verband in der Tschechoslowakischen Republik	789
