= Independent Social Democratic Party (Czech Lands) =

Czech political part

Independent Social Democratic Party was a Czech political party, formed by Czech trade unionists belonging to the Imperial Trade Union Commission in 1910. The party was supported by the Austrian Social Democracy.
