= Josef Nadler =

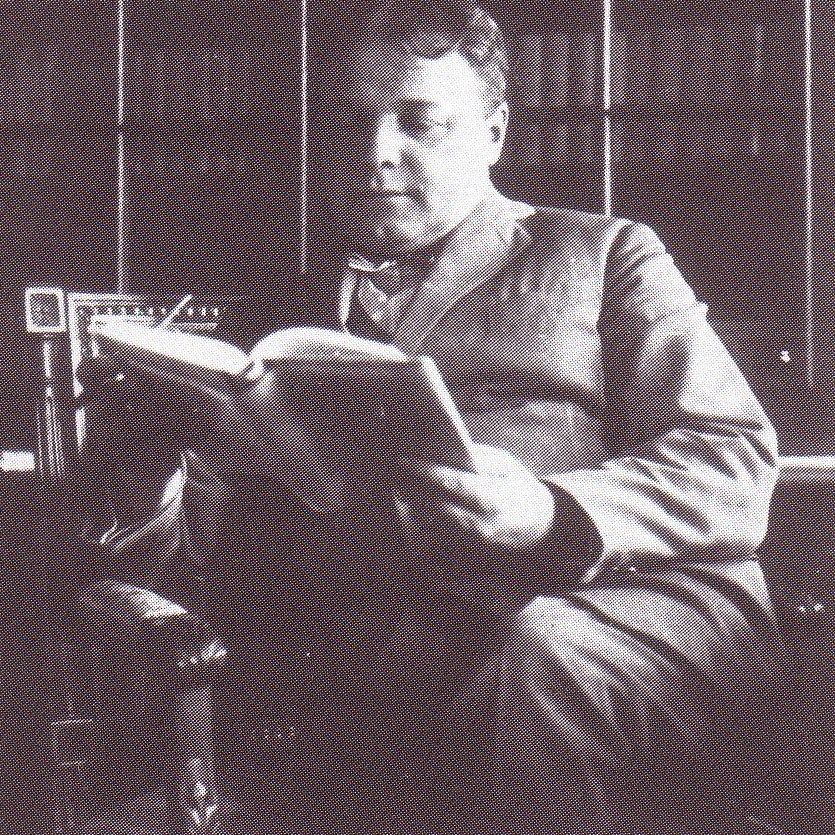
- Josef Nadler in 1930

Personal details
- Born: 23 May 1884 Nová Ves, Bohemia, Austria-Hungary
- Died: 14 January 1963 (aged 78) Vienna, Austria

Josef Nadler (23 May 1884 – 14 January 1963) was an Austrian Germanist and literary historian. He became known as a protagonist of the "new National Socialist poetry", especially during the Nazi era.

== Life and work ==
Nadler attended the Jesuit seminary in Bohosudov and the gymnasium in Česká Lípa. He graduated from there in 1904, He then studied German with a minor in Classical Philology at the Charles-Ferdinand University in Prague under Carl von Kraus, Adolf Hauffen, and August Sauer. Under the latter, Nadler earned his doctorate in 1908 with a dissertation on Eichendorff's poetry.

In 1912 Nadler published the first volume of his popular scientific history of literature. This formed the basis for his appointment as extraordinary professor, succeeding Wilhelm Kosch at the University of Fribourg in Üechtland in Switzerland. In 1914 Nadler became a full professor and taught there until 1925, although his tenure was interrupted by military service from 1914 to 1917. In 1925 Nadler was called to the Albertina in Königsberg (Prussia) as successor to Rudolf Unger. There he invited the Estonian poet and literary critic Gustav Suits to give lectures. Thanks to Nadler's good connections in Lithuania, including to his student Joseph Ehret in Kaunas, he was able to hold German language courses specifically for Lithuanian students.

In 1931, Nadler was called to Vienna to succeed Paul Kluckhohn. During the appointment process, an attempt was made to characterize the two main candidates: "As a personality, Nadler probably does not have Günther Müller's winning amiability and harmony, but he does have a very strong temperament and tenacious energy."“

After the Anschluss of Austria to the German Reich, Nadler renamed and revised his literary history, which had previously appeared in three editions. It appeared in its fourth edition under the title "Literaturgeschichte des deutschen Volkes" (Literary History of the German People, Berlin, 1938–1941). Here, his anti-Semitic tirades are notable. Nadler viewed Judaism as a threat:

"All European peoples, as long as they were healthy and independent, considered communal living with the Jews unwelcome and dangerous. All the young, emerging Western European states of the Middle Ages eradicated the Jews from among themselves down to the roots."

He particularly hated the poet Heinrich Heine. He showered Heine with a veritable torrent of insults. Walter Grab quoted him as follows: "An intellectual bankrupt without taste, without an organ for the spirit of art, truth, or inner composure, he [Heine] was the most influential destroyer of German prose style, the creator of the newspaper phrase."

Elsewhere, Nadler welcomed the murder of the writer Hugo Bettauer ( The City Without Jews ) in March 1925:

"It was a meaningful act when Hugo Bettauer was shot by a young man in 1925 because of his dirty trade."

This volume was included in the list of literature to be excluded in the Soviet Occupation Zone in 1947. After 1945, the more balanced 3rd edition was presented as a reprint.

Nadler, like Adolf Bartels, Heinz Kindermann, Franz Koch, Hellmuth Langenbucher, Walther Linden (1895–1943), Arno Mulot and Hans Naumann, was one of the leading literary scholars of the "Third Reich" who repeatedly called for a "new 'National Socialist poetry'". Because of his activities during the Nazi era, Nadler was decommissioned in 1945 and retired in 1947. A dispute over his rehabilitation followed, and Nadler became a leading figure in the newly forming German nationalist camp in Austria.

After 1945, he became known primarily as a literary historian. He published a literary history of Austria (1948), monographs on Franz Grillparzer (1948), Johann Georg Hamann (1949), Josef Weinheber (1952), and editions of the works of Hamann (Complete Works, 6 vols., 1949–57) and Weinheber (Complete Works, 5 vols., 1953–56). Nadler died on 14 January 1963, in Vienna. He was buried in the Grinzinger Cemetery. The grave has been abandoned. A biography of the writer Henry Benrath written by Nadler remained unpublished.

=== Literary history of the German tribes and regions ===
Nadler devoted his entire life to his main work, The Literary History of German Tribes and Landscapes (Regensburg 1912–1928). An early correspondence with August Sauer suggests that Nadler originally wanted to examine literature primarily from geographical and landscape perspectives, that is, how landscape and literature condition and interact with each other. Later, as becomes noticeable from the second volume onwards and especially clear in the fourth volume, he switched to essentialist and deterministic approaches and interpreted German literary history primarily from a "völkisch" perspective. According to this, the Germanic tribes absorbed the best characteristics of Roman culture through physical interbreeding with the Romans and thus became capable of incorporating these characteristics into the development of their " race ". Nadler assigned different ethnic groups different intellectual currents in German literature.

== Membership in the NSDAP ==
Franz Graf-Stuhlhofer emphasizes Nadler's often opinionated and opportunistic behavior. In 1935, Nadler sued the Viennese state school inspector Oskar Benda for defamation because he had associated him with National Socialism and questioned his Catholic orthodoxy. At that time, during the Catholic-oriented corporate state, Nadler felt he had to defend himself against such an assessment. After the war, Nadler used this complaint as an argument to demonstrate his distance from National Socialism.

Nadler applied for membership in the Nazi Party on 13 June 1938, and was admitted retroactively to May 1 of the same year ( membership number 6,196,904). At the beginning of 1944, he explained his active participation in the party: "I served in the local group from the summer of 1939 to June 1943, first as a block helper, then as a block warden..."

When a former student of Nadler questioned his National Socialist views, Nadler pointed out his active involvement in the NSDAP and the fact that he did not disregard racial studies (scientific racism) at all, but had even “demanded it as a central science” in his lectures.

At the end of 1942, Nadler found himself "forced" to appeal to the Vienna Gaugericht (Gau Court) in a "discriminatory matter" against him. In the postwar period, he described this as "persecution by the Vienna Gaugericht." The matter ended up in the Supreme Party Court in Munich, and Martin Bormann dealt with it. He mentioned Nadler's complaints against the two Reich Ministers, Goebbels and Rust. Referring to Nadler's 1935 lawsuit, Bormann worked towards the following solution: Nadler's admission with a low membership number—as if he had supported National Socialism when this was still forbidden in Austria—was incorrect, and therefore "the admission should be revoked and Professor Nadler honorably discharged from the party." But some committed National Socialists in Vienna did not want to implement this, especially Baldur von Schirach (Reich Governor in Vienna), who postponed the matter. It is not entirely clear whether an official decision was made here—Nadler only learned of this years later. Martin Bormann also mentioned in his letter of 25 February 1944 that he had to give Hitler information about Nadler, as he was currently reading his literary history.

== Awards and honors ==
- 1929 Gottfried Keller Prize
- 1942 Kant-Preis
- 1952 Mozart Medal from the University of Innsbruck
- 1960 Adalbert Stifter Medal

== Writings ==
- Literary history of the German tribes and regions
  - 1st edition, 3 volumes, Habbel, Regensburg 1912–1918:
    - Volume 1: The Old Tribes 800–1600 (1912) (Hathitrust Michigan = Digital copy on archive.org)
    - Volume 2: The New Tribes of 1300, the Old Tribes of 1600–1780 (1913) (Hathitrust Michigan = Digital copy on archive.org)
    - Volume 3: The heyday of the old tribes until 1805 and the new tribes until 1800 (1918) (Hathitrust California = Digitalisat auf archive.org)
  - 2nd edition, 4 volumes, Habbel, Regensburg 1923–1928:
    - Volume 1: The Old German Tribes 800–1740 (1923) (Hathitrust Michigan)
    - Volume 2: Saxony and the New Settlement Land 800–1786 (1923) (Hathitrust Michigan)
    - Volume 3: The German Spirit 1740–1813 (1924) (Hathitrust Michigan)
    - Volume 4: The German State 1814–1914 (1928) (Hathitrust Michigan)
  - 3rd edition, 4 volumes, Habbel, Regensburg 1929–1932 [Nachdruck 1978]:
    - Volume 1: The Old German Tribes 800–1740 (1929)
    - Volume 2: Saxony and the New Settlement Land 800–1786 (1931)
    - Volume 3: The German Spirit 1740–1813 (1931)
    - Volume 4: The German State 1814–1914 (1932)
  - 4th, completely revised edition, 4 volumes, Propyläen, Berlin 1938–1941, under the title Literary History of the German People: Poetry and Literature of the German Tribes and Regions:
    - Volume 1: People 800–1740 (1939) (Hathitrust Madison)
    - Volume 2: Mind 1740–1813 (1938) (Hathitrust Madison)
    - Volume 3: State 1814–1914 (1938) (1938) (Hathitrust Madison)
    - Volume 3: State 1814–1914 (1938) (1941) (Hathitrust Madison)
- History of the Development of German Literature, E. Diederich, Jena 1914 Hathitrust Princeton
- Die Wissenschaftslehre der Literaturgeschichte, in: Euphorion 21.1914, p. 1 ff (Digitalisat auf archive.org)
- The Austrian folk play, 1921
- Berlin Romanticism 1800–1814. A Contribution to the Common Folk Question: Renaissance, Romanticism, Restoration, 1921 (Digitalisat auf archive.org)
- On the Art and Culture of German-speaking Switzerland , H. Haessel, Leipzig 1922 (Digitalisat auf archive.org)
- The intellectual development of German-speaking Switzerland (1798–1848), H. Haessel, Leipzig 1924 (Digitalisat auf archive.org)
- The German Tribes, (Frommanns philosophische Taschenbücher 5. Gruppe – Deutsches Volkstum – Band 5) Fr. Frommann, Stuttgart 1925 (Hathitrust California = Digitalisat auf archive.org)
- Heinrich von Kleist. Speech delivered on 18 January 1928 , 1928
- Die Hamannausgabe. Vermächtnis, Bemühungen, Vollzug, Niemeyer, Halle 1930 (Schriften der Königsberger Gelehrten Gesellschaft, Geisteswissenschaftliche Klasse, 7,6))
- Hamann, Kant, Goethe. Vortrag, gehalten am 11. Januar 1931 in öffentlicher Sitzung der Königsberger Gelehrten Gesellschaft, 1931
- Buchhandel, Literatur und Nation in Geschichte und Gegenwart, 1932
- Literaturgeschichte der deutschen Schweiz, 1932
- Das stammhafte Gefüge des deutschen Volkes, 1934
- Deutscher Geist, deutscher Osten. 10 Reden, 1937
- Franz Grillparzer, Vaduz 1948 (Digital copy on archive.org)
- Literaturgeschichte Österreichs, 1948
- Johann Georg Hamann, 1730–1788. Der Zeuge des Corpus mysticum, 1949
- Geschichte der deutschen Literatur, 1951
- Josef Weinheber. Geschichte seines Lebens und seiner Dichtung, 1952
- Kleines Nachspiel, 1954
- Die deutsche Dichtung Österreichs, Eckartschriften Heft 14b, Österreichische Landsmannschaft, 1964

== Literature ==
- Gisela Brude-Firnau: Thomas Mann und Josef Nadler. Drei Dezennien Literaturgeschichte. In: Seminar, 31 (1995), University of Toronto Press, pp. 203–216.
- Moriz Enzinger: Josef Nadler – Nachruf. In: Almanach der Österreichischen Akademie der Wissenschaften, 113. Jahrgang (1963), pp. 385–415 (Sonderdruck).
- Elias H. Füllenbach: Nadler, Josef. In: Christoph König (Germanist) (Hrsg.), unter Mitarbeit von Birgit Wägenbaur u. a.: Internationales Germanistenlexikon 1800–1950. Band 2: H–Q. De Gruyter, Berlin/New York 2003, ISBN 3-11-015485-4, pp. 1298–1301.
- Elias H. Füllenbach: Josef Nadler. In: Michael Fahlbusch, Ingo Haar und Alexander Pinwinkler (Hrsg.): Handbuch der völkischen Wissenschaften. Akteure, Netzwerke, Forschungsprogramme. 2. vollst. überarb. u. erw. Aufl. Berlin 2017, pp. 533–540.
- Gedenkschrift für Josef Nadler aus Anlaß seines 100. Geburtstages. 1884–1984. Selbstverlag der J.-G.-Herder-Bibliothek Siegerland, Siegen 1984. (Schriften der J. G. Herder-Bibliothek Siegerland e. V. 14)
- Franz Graf-Stuhlhofer: Opportunisten, Sympathisanten und Beamte. Unterstützung des NS-Systems in der Wiener Akademie der Wissenschaften, dargestellt am Wirken Nadlers, Srbiks und Meisters. In: Wiener Klinische Wochenschrift 110 (1998), Heft 4–5 (Zum 60. Jahrestag der Vertreibung der jüdischen Kollegen aus der Wiener medizinischen Fakultät), pp. 152–157.
- Wolfgang Hecht: Nötige Bemerkungen zu einem unnötige Buche: Josef Nadler "Kleines Nachspiel". In: Wissenschaftliche Zeitschrift der Pädagogischen Hochschule Potsdam (Gesellschafts- und sprachwissenschaftlichen Reihe) 3 (1957), 1, pp. 103–106.
- Markus Knecht: Josef Nadlers "Literaturgeschichte der deutschen Stämme und Landschaften". Ein Beitrag zur Wissenschaftsgeschichte der Germanistik. München 1988 (Univ. Dipl.-Arb.).
- Hans-Christof Kraus: Josef Nadler (1884–1963) und Königsberg. In: Jahrbuch Preußenland 38 (2000), pp. 12–26.
- Sebastian Meissl, Friedrich Nemec (1997). "Nadler, Josef". Neue Deutsche Biographie (in German). Vol. 18. Berlin: Duncker & Humblot. pp. 690–692. (full text online).
- Wolfgang Müller-Funk: Josef Nadler: Kulturwissenschaft in nationalsozialistischen Zeiten? In: Die "österreichische" nationalsozialistische Ästhetik, hrsg. v. Ilija Dürhammer. Böhlau, Vienna u. a. 2003 ISBN 3-205-77151-6.
- Irene Ranzmaier: Deutsche Nationalliteratur(en) als Kultur-, Sozial- und Naturgeschichte. Josef Nadlers stammkundliche Literaturgeschichtsschreibung 1909–1931. Vienna 2005 (Univ. Diss. 2005).
- Irene Ranzmaier: Germanistik an der Universität Wien zur Zeit des Nationalsozialismus. Karrieren, Konflikte und die Wissenschaft. Böhlau, Vienna 2005, pp. 102–123 (über Nadler als Lehrstuhlinhaber) und 163–167 (über Nadlers Entnazifizierung).
- Walter Rumpf: Bibliographie Josef Nadler. Eine Zusammenstellung der wichtigsten Publikationen und Veröffentlichungen in den Jahren 1909–1934. Breslau 1935.
- Universitätsprofessor Dr. Josef Nadler zum 75. Geburtstag. Gewidmet von seinen Freunden und Schülern. Österreich. Bundesverlag, Vienna 1959.
- Peter Wiesinger, Daniel Steinbach: 150 Jahre Germanistik in Wien. Außeruniversitäre Frühgermanistik und Universitätsgermanistik. Edition Praesens, Vienna 2001, ISBN 3-7069-0104-8.
- Jan Zimmermann: Die Kulturpreise der Stiftung F.V.S. 1935–1945. Darstellung und Dokumentation. Hrsg. von der Alfred Toepfer Stiftung F.V.S. Hamburg 2000, pp. 152–164.
- Hans Huchzermeyer: Zur Geschichte der evangelischen Kirchenmusik in Königsberg/Preußen (1800–1945). Die kirchenmusikalischen Ausbildungsstätten, Minden 2013, ISBN 978-3-00-041717-7, pp. 129–135.
