= Federation of Free Trade Unions in Austria =

The Federation of Free Trade Unions in Austria (German: Bund freier Gewerkschaften in Österreich) was a trade union centre in Austria.

The federation was established in 1928, when the Imperial Trade Union Commission was refounded on an industrial union basis. It had 38 affiliates, with a total of 655,000 members, and was led by Anton Hueber.

In February 1934, the federation was banned by the Austrofascist government.

Affiliates included:

- Austrian Construction Union
- Austrian Metalworkers' Union (merged into Austrian Metal and Mineworkers' Union in 1931)
- Austrian Senefelder Union
- Central Association of Commercial Employees of Austria
- Reich Association of Austrian Printing and Newspaper Workers
- Union of Artificial Flower and Decorative Feather Workers of Austria
- Union of Austrian Woodworkers
- Union of Bookbinders and Paper Workers of Austria
- Union of Cardboard Box Workers of Austria
- Union of Carpenters of Austria
- Union of Decorators, House Painters, Varnishers and Related Professions of Austria
- Union of Domestic Assistants, Educators and Homeworkers
- Union of Furriers and Related Trades of Austria
- Union of Hairdressers' Assistants of Austria
- Union of Hat Makers of Austria
- Union and Legal Protection Association for Austrian Railway Personnel
- Union of Office Assistants in Industry in Austria
- Union of Stoneworkers
- Union of Tailors of Austria
- Union of Textile Workers of Austria
- Union of Workers in the Chemical Industry of Austria
