= Postage stamps and postal history of Slovakia =

A modern stamp of Slovakia

This is a survey of the postage stamps and postal history of Slovakia.

Slovakia is a landlocked country in Central Europe with a population of over five million and an area of about 49,000 square kilometres (19,000 sq mi). Slovakia borders the Czech Republic and Austria to the west, Poland to the north, Ukraine to the east and Hungary to the south. The largest city is its capital, Bratislava.

== Austria-Hungary ==
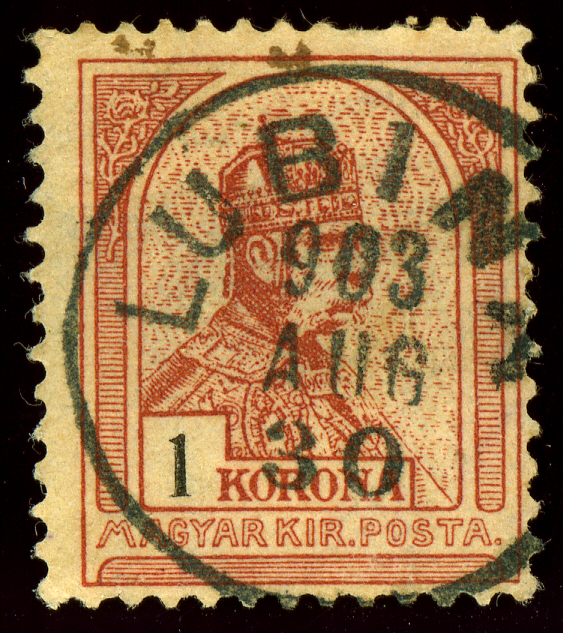
A 1900 stamp of the Kingdom of Hungary cancelled at Lubina, Slovakia, in 1903

Before 1918, the territory of modern Slovakia was part of the Kingdom of Hungary within the Austro-Hungarian Empire. Stamps of the Kingdom of Hungary were in use.

== Czechoslovak Republic ==
After World War I and the dissolution of the Austro-Hungarian Empire, Slovakia and the regions of Bohemia, Moravia, and Carpathian Ruthenia formed the Czechoslovak Republic. From 1918 to 1939, stamps of the Czechoslovak Republic inscribed either Česko-Slovensko or Československo were used in Slovakia.

== World War II ==
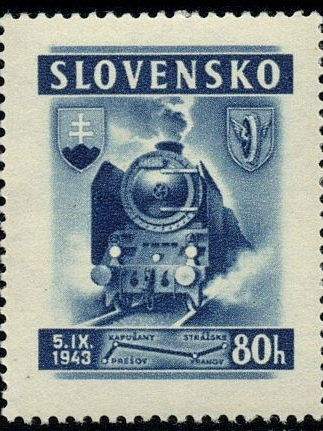
A 1943 stamp of the Slovak Republic

Between 1939 and 1945, the Slovak Republic, a client state of Nazi Germany, issued stamps inscribed Slovensko.

== Post war ==
After World War II, Slovakia was again part of the re-established Czechoslovakia from 1945 to 1992. Czechoslovak stamps inscribed Československo were used during that time.

== Slovak Republic ==
From 1 January 1993, Slovakia became independent after splitting from the Czech Republic and stamps were issued from that date inscribed Slovensko. Stamps of the former Czechoslovakia continued to be valid until 30 September 1993.

== See also ==
- Postage stamps and postal history of Czechoslovakia
- Postage stamps and postal history of the Czech Republic
- Society for Czechoslovak Philately
