= Nová Ves (Liberec District) =

- Municipality
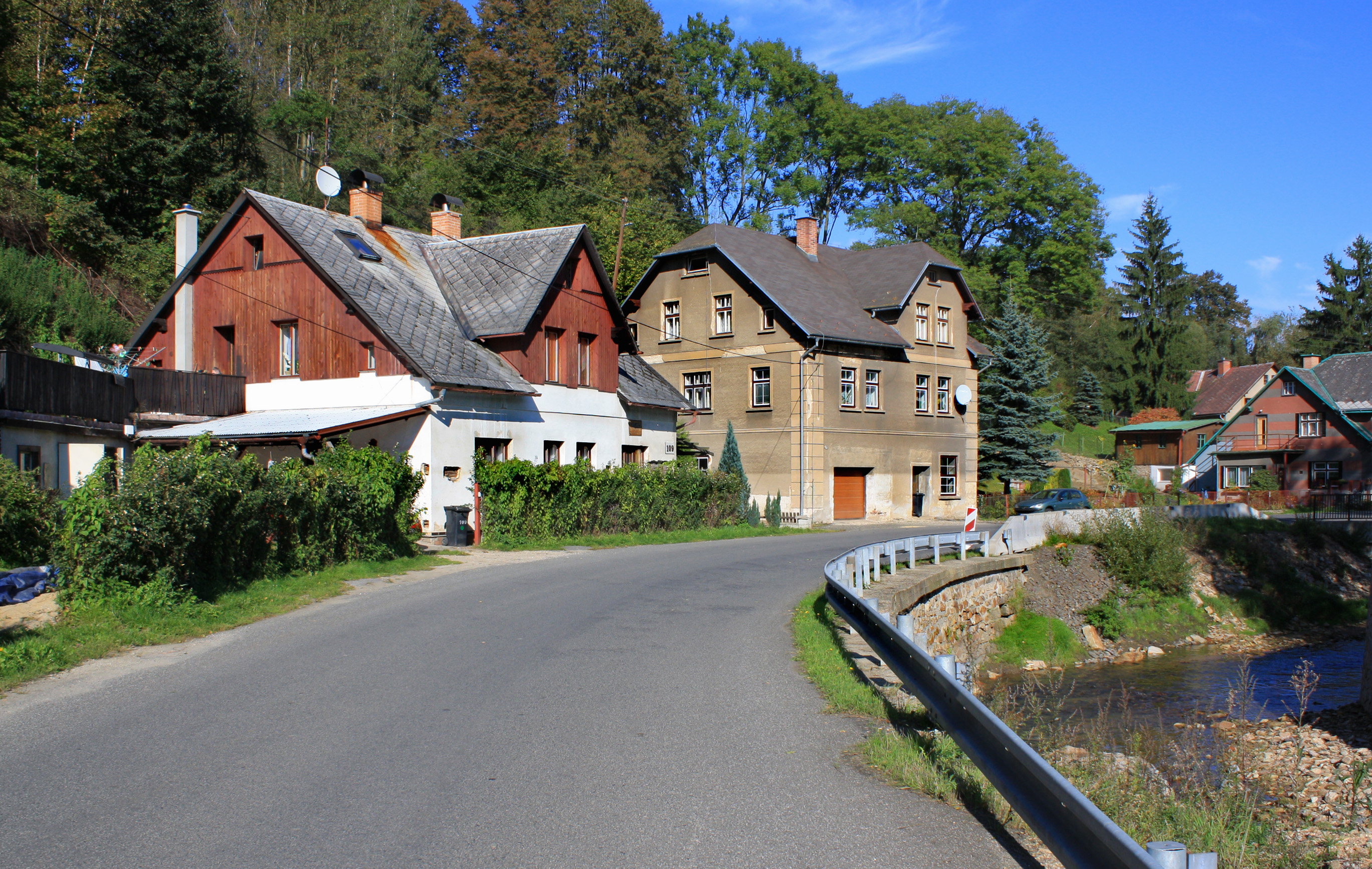
- Middle part of Nová Ves

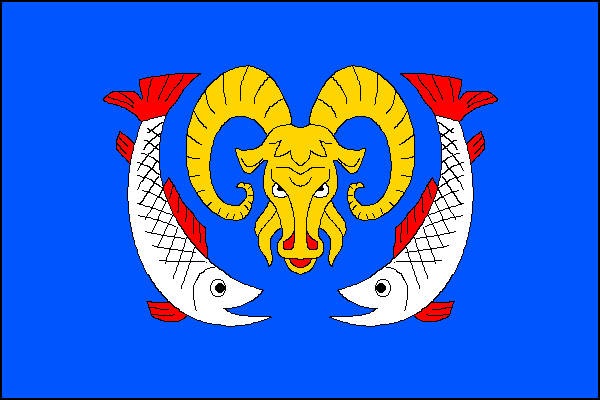
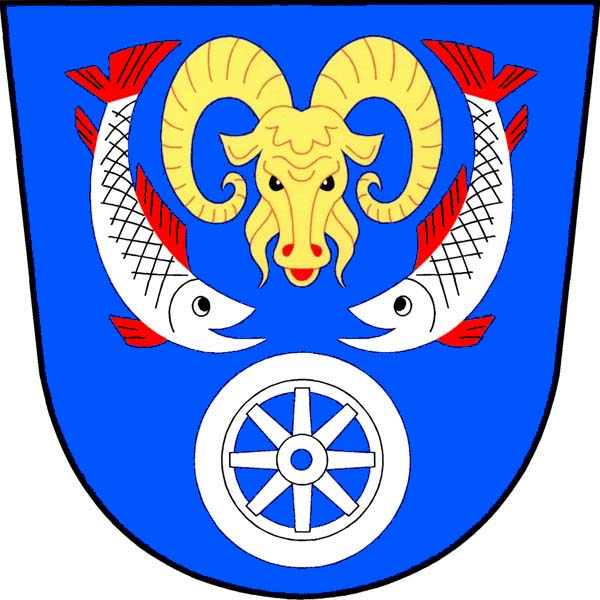
- Flag Coat of arms

- Location in the Czech Republic
- Coordinates: 50°49′54″N 15°0′4″E
- Country: Czech Republic
- Region: Liberec
- District: Liberec
- First mentioned: 1464

Area
  - Total: 12.34 km^{2} (4.76 sq mi)
- Elevation: 353 m (1,158 ft)

Population (2026-01-01)
  - Total: 967
  - Density: 78.4/km^{2} (203/sq mi)
- Time zone: UTC+1 (CET)
  - Summer (DST): UTC+2 (CEST)
- Postal code: 463 31
- Website: www.nova-ves.eu

Nová Ves (German: Neundorf) is a municipality and village in Liberec District in the Liberec Region of the Czech Republic. It has about 1,000 inhabitants.

== Administrative division ==
Nová Ves consists of four municipal parts (in brackets population according to the 2021 census):

- Nová Ves (723)
- Mlýnice (45)
- Nová Víska (47)
- Růžek (99)

== Etymology ==
The name means 'new village' in Czech.

== Geography ==
Nová Ves is located about 7 kilometres (4 mi) north of Liberec. The southern part of the municipal territory lies in the Zittau Basin, the northern part lies in the Jizera Mountains. The highest point is at 583 m (1,913 ft) above sea level. The Jeřice River flows through the municipality.

== History ==
The first written mention of Nová Ves is from 1464. The Schwanitz family owned the village from 1498 to 1595, then they sold it to Katharina of Redern. She had built here a church. After the Battle of White Mountain, Nová Ves was acquired by Albrecht von Wallenstein. After that, the village changed several owners in a short period of time. It wasn't until 1712 that the Gallas family bought it and added it to the Liberec estate.

== Demographics ==
Historical population

Year	Pop.	±%
1869	1,953	—
1880	1,871	−4.2%
1890	1,794	−4.1%
1900	1,809	+0.8%
1910	1,794	−0.8%

Year	Pop.	±%
1921	1,588	−11.5%
1930	1,545	−2.7%
1950	891	−42.3%
1961	859	−3.6%
1970	784	−8.7%

Year	Pop.	±%
1980	738	−5.9%
1991	559	−24.3%
2001	656	+17.4%
2011	782	+19.2%
2021	914	+16.9%

Source: Censuses

== Transport ==
The I/13 road (the section from Liberec to the Czech–Polish border in Habartice) runs along the eastern municipal border.

== Sights ==
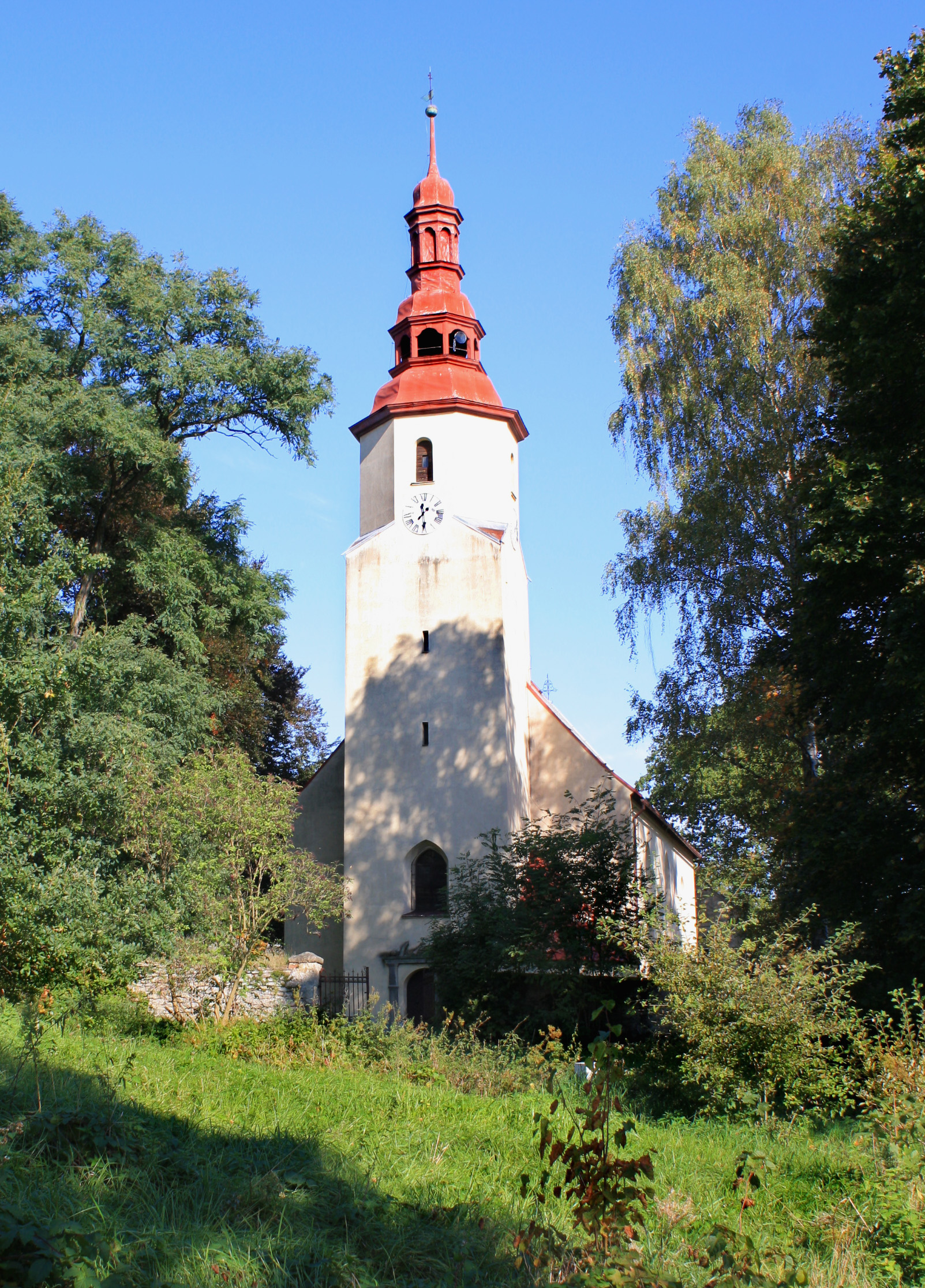
Church of the Assumption of the Virgin Mary

The main landmark of Nová Ves is the Church of the Assumption of the Virgin Mary. It was built in 1616–1617. It was modified at the turn of the 19th and 20th centuries, but kept its Renaissance core.

== Notable people ==
- Franz Macoun (1881–1951), Sudeten German politician
- Josef Nadler (1884–1963), Austrian Germanist and literary historian
