= Agricultural Labourers Union of Southwestern Slovakia =

Trade union in Slovakia

Agricultural Labourers' Union of Southwestern Slovakia
- Location: Slovakia
- Key people: Gyula Nagy (Secretary)
- Affiliations: Union

The Agricultural Labourers Union of Southwestern Slovakia was a trade union of Hungarian agricultural labourers in Slovakia. It was affiliated to the Hungarian-German trade union council Union. Gyula Nagy, an important figure in the leftwing in Slovakia at the time, was the secretary of the Agricultural Labourers Union (as well as being the secretary of Union and a parliamentarian of the Hungarian-German Social Democratic Party).

The Agricultural Labourers Union held a congress on April 4, 1920, in Bratislava. At the congress Gyula Nagy argued that reaching collective wage agreements and land reform were more pressing issues than revolutionary struggle.
