= Union der Bergarbeiter =

Union der Bergarbeiter in der CSR ('Union of Miners in the Czechoslovak Republic'), initially known as Union der Bergarbeiter Österreichs ('Union of Miners of Austria'), was a miners trade union of miners in Austria and the First Czechoslovak Republic 1903–1938. Initially a multi-ethnic union in Habsburg Austria (Cisleithania), it was divided along ethnic lines in 1910. After the establishment of the Czechoslovak Republic, it became a union for miners of German ethnicity.

== Founding ==
The union was founded in Turn in 1903. The establishment of the union was preceded by two years of mobilizations to build a new national miners union. District assemblies electing delegates for the founding congress were held in Falkenau, Kladno, Mährisch-Ostrau, Nürschan, Schatzlar and the Alpine district. In May 1903 these delegates joined the representatives of the Turn union and smaller unions for deliberations in Turn. The debates lasted for 15 hours, after which a constitution for the Union der Bergarbeiter Österreichs was adopted. In its founding year, the union claimed to have 5,997 members. The union had its headquarters in Turn-Teplice. The union leadership at Turn consisted of a seven-member executive committee, led by its chairman. The membership dues were 30 heller per week.

At a conference in Leoben on June 28, 1903 the mine workers union of the Austrian Alpine counties (Styria, Carinthia, Carniola, Upper and Lower Austria, Salzburg and Istria) voted to join the Union der Bergarbeiter, bringing some 1,600 members to the fold. By March 1, 1904 the union claimed 9,256 members, distributed geographically and ethnically along the following lines;

District	Czechs	Germans	Slovenians	Poles	Italians
Komotau, Brüx and Teplice	631	429			
Falkenau and Elbogen	69	811			
Pilsen and Mies	1,036	398			
Brünn (Rossitz)	225				
Styria, Lower and Upper Austria, Tyrol, Salzburg, Carinthia, Carniola, Istria and Dalmatia	19	1,159	1,467		471
Prague (Kladno) and Slaný	147				
Mährisch-Ostrau and Galicia	1,142	2		1,144	
Kuttenberg		106			
Total	3,269	2,905	1,467	1,144	471

By September 1904 the union membership had increased to 11,531; 3,622 in Bohemia, 2,252 in Silesia, 1,114 in Moravia, 2,967 in Styria, 45 in Upper Austria, 79 in Lower Austria, 60 in Salzburg, 38 in Tyrol, 155 in Carniola, 125 in Carinthia, 659 in Istria and 414 in Galicia.

== Growth and 1910 split ==
By 1905 the union membership had increased to 17,749, in 1906 to 27,989, in 1907 to 30,715 and by 1908 the membership had reached 32,613. By this point the union had over 20% of all mine workers in Austria as its members. The union had local branches in mining districts across the country. The union was affiliated to the Imperial Trade Union Commission and the Miners' International Federation.

From the onset the organization had opposed any sort of ethnic subdivisions within the union movement. However the union was badly affected by the Czech/German split in the trade union movement, as a separate Union of Czech Miners was founded in October 1910. The Union der Bergarbeiter lost more than half of its membership during this crisis. In particular, it lost influence in Ostrau.

== In the Czechoslovak Republic ==
The name 'Union der Bergarbeiter in der CSR' was adopted after the establishment of Czechoslovakia. The branches of the union in areas that remained in Austria formed a separate union, the Verband der Bergarbeiter Deutschösterreichs ('Union of Miners of German Austria'), in 1920. Union der Bergarbeiter in der CSR was affiliated to the Central Commission of German Trade Unions in the Czechoslovak Republic. Politically it was linked to the German Social Democratic Workers Party in the Czechoslovak Republic. By 1920 the Union der Bergarbeiter in der CSR had some 46,000 members. But with the emerging economic crisis and the neglect of the mining industry by the Prague government, the membership of the union declined. By 1921 it had dropped to 37,582, in 1925 the union had 16,261 members and by 1936 just 14,057. In 1928, Union der Bergarbeiter won 308 out of a total of 1,305 seats in mine workers councils across Czechoslovakia. The union was the largest miners union in North Bohemia (where is won 178 out of 451 council seats) and Falkenov (where it won 95 out of 126 seats).

== Leadership ==
Anton Jarolim served as the chairman of the union from 1906 until his death in 1933. Josef Zinner took over as chairman of the union after Jarolim's death. Peter Cingr served as deputy chairman and secretary from the foundation of the union. Emil Haase was the general secretary of the union during the Czechoslovakia period. The 9th congress of the union ('XI. Unionstag'), held in Brüx June 19-21, 1937 elected the following leadership: Zinner (Falkenau) as chairman, Josef Zwonar from Schönfeld and Franz Schaffarsch from Weißkirchlitz as deputy chairmen, Haase from Turn as Central Secretary, and Johann Kloiber, Karl Wildner, Hermann Lehnert, Richard Wirkner, Franz Demel Johann Sippl, Wenzel Lutz, Josef Lischka and Josef Hübner as the remaining members of the executive.

== Press organs ==
The union published the weekly newspaper Glück Auf in German language. Karl Schmidt served as the editor of Glück Auf between 1919 and 1938. The Czech-language newspaper Na zdar! was the Czech language organ of the union. It later became the organ of the Czech Miners Union. Górnik ('Miner') was the Polish language organ of the union. It was initially published from Cieszyn, and later from Mährisch-Ostrau. The Slovenian language organ was Rudar, issued from Trifail.
