= Postage stamps and postal history of the Czech Republic =

A 2009 stamp of the Czech Republic depicting a castle in Horšovský Týn

This is a survey of the postage stamps and postal history of the Czech Republic.

Czechia is a country in Central Europe which borders Poland to the northeast, Germany to the west and northwest, Austria to the south and Slovakia to the east.

== First stamps ==
The first stamps of the Czech Republic were issued on 20 January 1993 after the former Czechoslovakia was split into the Slovak Republic and the Czech Republic from 1 January 1993. Before then, stamps of the Czechoslovak Republic were in use and were still valid until 30 September 1993. Stamps of the Czech Republic are marked Česká republika.

First stamps was printed printing house by the Ministry of Communication - the Czech Post's Technical Centre of Machines. After privatization in 1992 The Postal Printing House of Securities Prague, Inc. = Poštovní tiskárna cenin Praha a.s.

== Stamp booklets ==
Over 100 stamp booklets have been issued to date.

== See also ==
- Postage stamps and postal history of Czechoslovakia
- Postage stamps and postal history of Slovakia
- Society for Czechoslovak Philately
