= Sdružení československých horníků =

Sdružení československých horníků ('Czechoslovak Miners Association', abbreviated SČH) was a Syndicalist mine workers trade union in Czechoslovakia.

The union had its roots in the Free Association of Miners and Ironworkers of Austria. SČH was founded in Northern Bohemia by anarchists and revolutionary socialists. The new union revived the journal Hornické Listy ('Miners' Newspaper'), which had been the organ of the Free Association of Miners and Ironworkers of Austria, as its organ. The prominent anarcho-syndicalist Václav Draxl was the main leader of the new union. The union was not affiliated to any trade union centre.

On November 25, 1919, SČH organized a miners' strike, which was repressed by police and army. Many miners were arrested. Whilst initially the revolutionary syndicalists of SČH had operated more or less independently, the union was tied closer to the Czechoslovak Socialist Party as it faced police repression and its members struggled with economic hardship. SČH became increasingly dependent on the Czechoslovak Socialist Party. When Stanislav Kostka Neumann led a split in the Czechoslovak Socialist Party in 1920 and organized the Union of Communist Groups, a minority of SČH members joined him. On December 11–15, 1920 workers across Czechoslovakia organized a general strike in response to the police attack on the Rudé právo newspaper office in Prague. Striking workers were attacked by police forces. Workers in Kladno, including the SČH, declared a 'socialist council republic'.

SČH sided with the Independent Socialist Party (the Bohuslav Vrbenský group) in the 1923 split in the Czechoslovak Socialist Party. It was the sole union linked to the Vrbenský tendency. SČH took part in the general strike of miners in Bohemia that lasted from the end of August to early October 1923. Around 1923 the union claimed to have 2,220 members.

SČH was gradually weakened as members of the union joined the communist-led Red Trade Unions. In April 1927 a congress of the union voted on a merger with the communist-led Mezinárodní všeodborový svaz and the Red International of Labour Unions. The congress voted not to merge, but sectors of the union joined the MVS miners section afterwards.

Journalist and writer Alois Šefl was a leading member of the union.
