= Gewerkschaft der Postler =

German trade union in Czechoslovakia

- Type: Trade union
- Headquarters: Reichenberg
- Location: First Czechoslovak Republic

Stamp of the union

Gewerkschaft der Postler ('Postmens' Trade Union') was a German trade union in the First Czechoslovak Republic. The union was affiliated to the Central Commission of German Trade Unions in the Czechoslovak Republic.

The union had its headquarter in Reichenberg. As of 30 June 1924 the union claimed a membership of 4,420 (3,592 male, 828 female). Joseph Tichak served as the chairman of the union. The union issued a monthly publication named Gewerkschaft der Postler, edited by Paul Gottschlich.

The third congress of the PTT International, held from 14 to 17 July 1924, granted membership to the union in the international.

By the mid-1920s there were mass layoffs of government employees, with a national bias. The German postal workers joined protests against the imposition of language requirements for government employees. In 1935 the union resolved to combat the dismissals of German employees from the Postal and Telegraph Services. Frustration had grown in the postal worker ranks over the Social Democratic government policies, and by mid-1933 the Eger branch of the union issued a call for an extraordinary union congress and disaffiliation from the Central Commission of German Trade Unions. The appeal obtained support from 8 out of 54 local branches of the union.

In 1938, as Tichak resigned from his leadership post over health issues, the union distanced itself from the Social Democrats and withdrew from the Central Commission of German Trade Unions.
