= Orthogonal signal correction =

Orthogonal Signal Correction (OSC) is a spectral preprocessing technique that removes variation from a data matrix X that is orthogonal to the response matrix Y. OSC was introduced by researchers at the University of Umea in 1998 and has since found applications in domains including metabolomics.
