= John Macoun =

Irish-born Canadian naturalist (1831–1920)

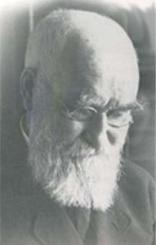
- Born: 17 April 1831; Magheralin, County Down, Ireland
- Died: 18 June 1920 (aged 89); Sidney, British Columbia, Canada
- Resting place: Beechwood Cemetery, Ottawa, Ontario, Canada
- Occupation: naturalist

John Macoun (17 April 1831 – 18 June 1920) was an Irish-born Canadian naturalist.

== Early life ==
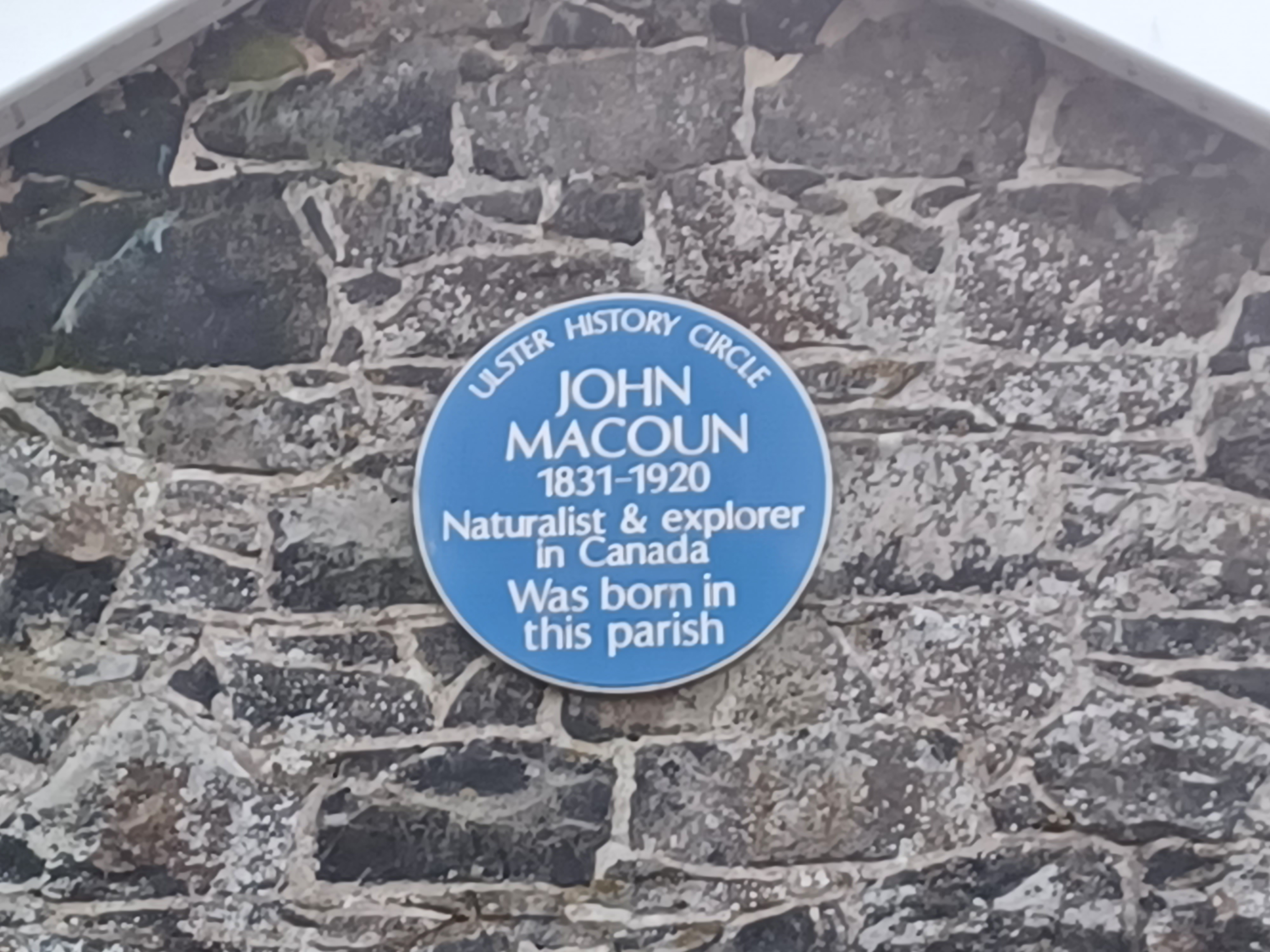
A plaque in Magheralin dedicated to John Macoun

Macoun was born in Magheralin, County Down, Ireland in 1831, the third child of James Macoun and Anne Jane Nevin. In 1850, the worsening economic situation in Ireland led his family to emigrate to Canada, where he settled in Seymour Township, Ontario and began farming. Unsatisfied as a farmer, he became a school teacher in 1856. It was during this time that he developed a nearly obsessive interest in botany. Although his formal education was slight, his knowledge and dedication to field work became sufficiently advanced that he gained the notice and respect of several professional botanists. By 1860 he was teaching school in Belleville, and had established correspondence with botanists such as Asa Gray, Sir William Jackson Hooker, George Lawson, and Louis-Ovide Brunet. This allowed him in 1868 to secure a faculty position as a Professor of Botany and Geology at Albert College in Belleville. His marriage on 1 January 1862 to Ellen Terrill of Brighton, Ontario was to lead to two sons and three daughters. His elder son James Melville Macoun was his lifelong assistant. His younger son William Terrill Macoun, became the Dominion Horticulturist for Canada.

== Western explorations ==
In 1872, Macoun was recruited to the exploratory party of Sir Sandford Fleming, then chief engineer for the proposed Canadian Pacific Railway. With Fleming's exploratory party, Macoun began his exploration at Port Arthur. Between 1872 and 1881, Macoun participated in five separate surveying expeditions in the Northwest. Aside from determining the best route for the railway, a major purpose of these expeditions was to determine the agricultural potential of various regions of the west. Since Macoun's travels corresponded to a time of unusually high rainfall, he concluded that large regions of the Northwest were ideally suited to agriculture. Unfortunately, this mistakenly included the normally arid plains of southern Saskatchewan and Alberta in the region now known as Palliser's Triangle, which was to become a dustbowl during the Great Depression of the 1930s. In concert with the political consideration of forestalling northwards American expansion, Macoun's assessment contributed much to the final southern routing of the CPR across the prairies.

== Later career ==
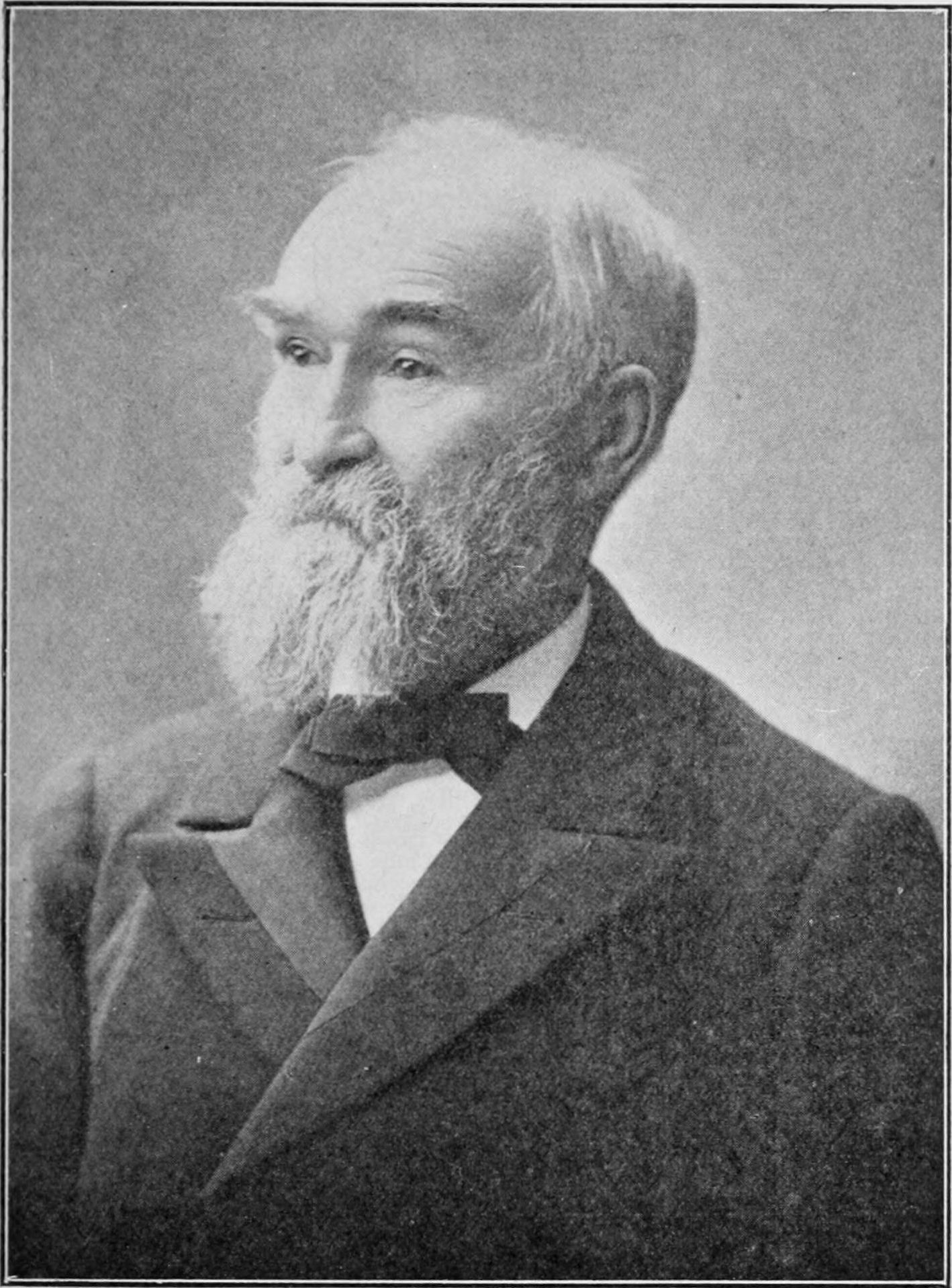
Macoun in 1912

Macoun's reports from west attracted the notice of Alfred Richard Cecil Selwyn, director of the Geological Survey of Canada (GSC), and in 1879, the Government of Canada took the unusual step of officially appointing him "Explorer of the Northwest territories". In 1881, after the mission of the GSC had been expanded to include natural history, he moved his family to Ottawa and joined the GSC as "Botanist to the Geological and Natural History Survey of Canada". He remained with the GSC for 31 years and became an Assistant Director in 1887. In 1882 he became one of the charter members of the Royal Society of Canada. Every summer was dedicated to fieldwork, and for the remainder of his life Macoun was a prolific collector and cataloguer of Canadian flora and fauna, even after suffering a debilitating stroke in 1912. Macoun issued a number of exsiccatae and exsiccata-like series, among them Canadian Musci (1889-1893) and Canadian Lichens (? 1900). To this day, over 100,000 samples from his collection of plants are housed in the National Herbarium of Canada, Canadian Museum of Nature, in Ottawa.

Macoun died 18 July 1920 in Sidney, British Columbia, and is interred in Beechwood Cemetery in Ottawa.

== Family ==
In 1862, Macoun married Ellen Terrill; they had six children.

== Legacy ==
Macoun marsh, on the cemetery's property, is named for him. Mount Macoun, south of the Rogers Pass is named for him as well.

In 1896, N. L. Britton & A. Brown published Macounastrum (in the family Polygonaceae) in Macoun's honour, this is now a synonym of Koenigia L.

In 1974 botanist Robert Root Ireland, published Neomacounia nitida, or Macoun's shining moss, which is a moss, that was found only in a small area of Ontario, and the sole species in the genus Neomacounia. This species is the only known endemic Canadian plant to become extinct since the 16th century.

== Bibliography ==
- Macoun, John (1878): Catalogue of the Phænogamous and Cryptogamous Plants.
- Macoun, John, George Monro Grant, Alexander Begg, John Campbell McLagan (1882): Manitoba and the Great North-West: the field for investment, the home of the emigrant: being a full and complete history of the country. Guelph, Ontario: The World Publishing Company.
- Macoun, John (1883-1902): Catalogue of Canadian plants.
- Macoun, John, Macoun, James M. (1915): Catalogue of Canadian birds.
- Macoun, John (1979): Autobiography of John Macoun, Canadian explorer and naturalist, 1831-1920, Second Edition. Ottawa Field-Naturalists' Club.
