= Macoun Developers Conference =

Annual conference in Frankfurt, Germany

- Frequency: Annual
- Venue: Haus der Jugend
- Location: Frankfurt
- Founded: October 25, 2007
- Most recent: October 4-6, 2019
- Participants: ~450
- Organizer: Macoun GbR
- Website: www.macoun.de

The Macoun Developers Conference (Note: Pronounced "Ma-coon" [mə'kuːn]) is a conference held annually since 2007 in Frankfurt am Main by Macoun GbR. It is Europe's biggest conference focused on Apple systems and is held in German.

While the event is organized by a single-purpose company, most of the work is done by a community on a pro-bono basis. Chris Hauser and Thomas Biedorf, founders of Macoun GbR, started the conference to allow European developers that cannot attend Apple's WWDC to have a "small WWDC".

The number of attendees grew from initially 200 to around 450, with a maximum of 507 in 2016. The location, a youth hostel (“Haus der Jugend”), limits the number of attendees to 500. During the first ten years, 99 speakers have held more than 200 talks at Macoun.

The conference name "Macoun" is derived from the apple of the same name. Having "#Macoun" as official hashtag has led to confusion for American fruit-lovers on social media.

== Topics ==
The conference, dubbed by the press as "German alternative to WWDC" is a communication platform for developers on the Apple platform.

The conference values the direct exchange between developers, talks featuring latest technical topics, problems around software development, best practices, and topics around quality assurance.

Besides talks in up to three concurrent sessions, Macoun has workshops, exhibitions (Digital Retro Park’s Apple exhibition being the most notable), panels, and a experts group similar to WWDC labs (called Werkstatt).

== Speakers ==
The conference does not have paid speakers but nonetheless the list of speakers contains some widely known names such as Andy Abgottspon, Chris Eidhof, Max Seelemann (Winner of Apple Design Awards 2016), Ortwin Gentz (Where To?), Thomas Tempelmann (FCopy, Tempelmon, ...), Uli Kusterer (Uli's Moose) and others.

== History ==
Timeline of events
Dates	Attendees	Focus	List of talks, material
October 25, 2008	206	The first Macoun conference focused on developer tools and technical topics. The then newly released iPhone SDK was of general interest.	
September 26, 2009	291	iPhone OS was still a major topic but the conference widened to more general topics such as UI testing, data serialization and aspectoriented programming.	
October 2–3, 2010	302	In 2010 the wider range of topics continued and with 3D-printing, the first talk about building custom hardware was given.	
October 1–2, 2011	438	In 2011 “living as a developer” got some attention with talks about being/becoming an independent developer and about being an intern at Apple.	
October 27–28, 2012	467	Starting 2012, Macoun had its own conference App in the iTunes App Store.	
October 5–6, 2013	454	In 2013 the topics continued to cover a wide range from low level talks (ARM-Assembler) to high level architecture talks. Talks related to hardware development had their time as well as a retrospective on a successful app development.	
September 27–28, 2014	411	WWDC 2014's Swift release made Swift one of the most important topics at Macoun 2014.	
October 24–25, 2015	474	Swift still was a big topic in 2015 but developing for watchOS and tvOS also received much attention.	
October 1–2, 2016	507	In 2016, Apple's release of HomeKit found its reflection at Macoun.	
October 7–8, 2017	438	For the tenth anniversary, attendees could vote for several talks that did not get accepted in previous years. These talks made about one third of the program.	
September 15–16, 2018	~250	Due to several problems in the organisation of the event, Macoun 2018 had to be held mid September, resulting in a noticeable drop in the number of attendees. The talks covered new developments in Apple's frameworks (ARKit2, CoreML/CreateML) as well as third party frameworks, a view onto coding history as well as legal advices (related to GDPR)	
October 4–6, 2019	~250	In 2019 the Macoun was a three-day event that started the day after German Unity Day. The focus of the technical talks was on SwiftUI, Catalyst, and enhanced Apple frameworks such as CoreNFC. Besides mainly technical topics, the 2019 had several talks on non technical topics such as marketing on a small budget. As a new block, there were longer sessions where speakers held workshops with limited seats.	
September 26–27, 2020 (announced)	Canceled due to COVID-19 pandemic.		
2021	Canceled due to COVID-19 pandemic.		
2022	Canceled due to COVID-19 pandemic.		
September 23–24, 2023 (announced)	-/-	To be announced	-/-
