= Macoun marsh =

Small wetland in Ontario, Canada

Coordinates: 45.4458°N 75.6520°W

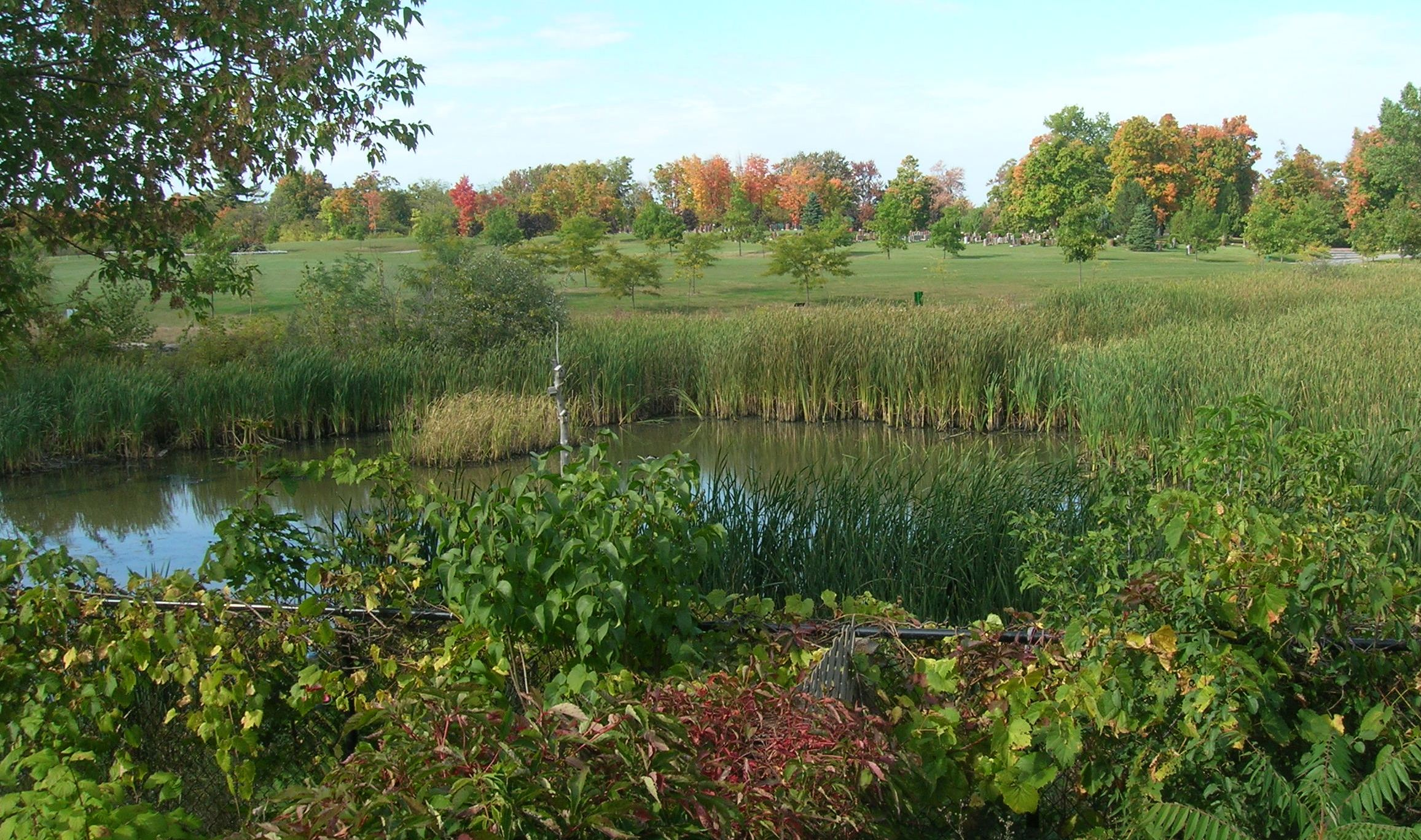

The John Macoun Marsh is a small wetland located on the property of the Beechwood Cemetery, in Ottawa, Ontario, Canada. Maintained and protected by the Beechwood Cemetery, the teachers and students of St. Laurent Academy, a nearby private school, adopted the marsh as a research and conservation area for students. In 2004, the Educarium private school joined with the Jean Vanier Catholic School to continue the education work. To date, almost 1,400 species have been recorded by students there.

In 2006, the Macoun Marsh team won international recognition in the Volvo Adventure, an environmental award connected to the United Nations Environmental Program.

The marsh name honours Canadian naturalist John Macoun, and was chosen by the students of Educarium.

In 2009, the Macoun Marsh team built connections with international youth groups to create the Second International Youth Symposium for Biodiversity. This event brought youth from Barbados, Canada, Honduras, India, Japan, Mexico, and the United States together to share their biodiversity projects. This event was held in Ottawa, Ontario, Canada. They also began work on a Youth Accord (first written in 2005 in Mexico) to present in Japan for the International Year of Biodiversity in 2010.

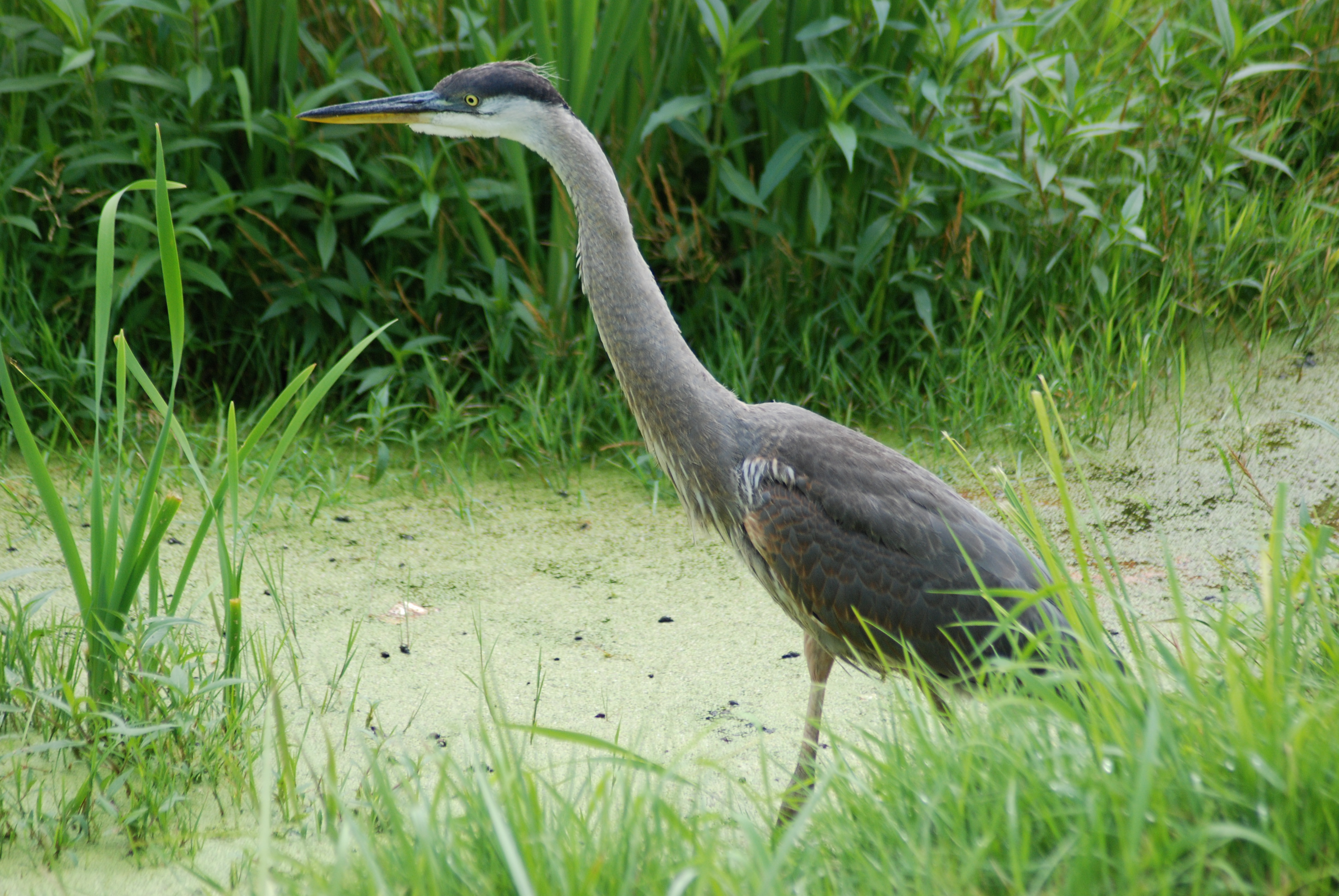

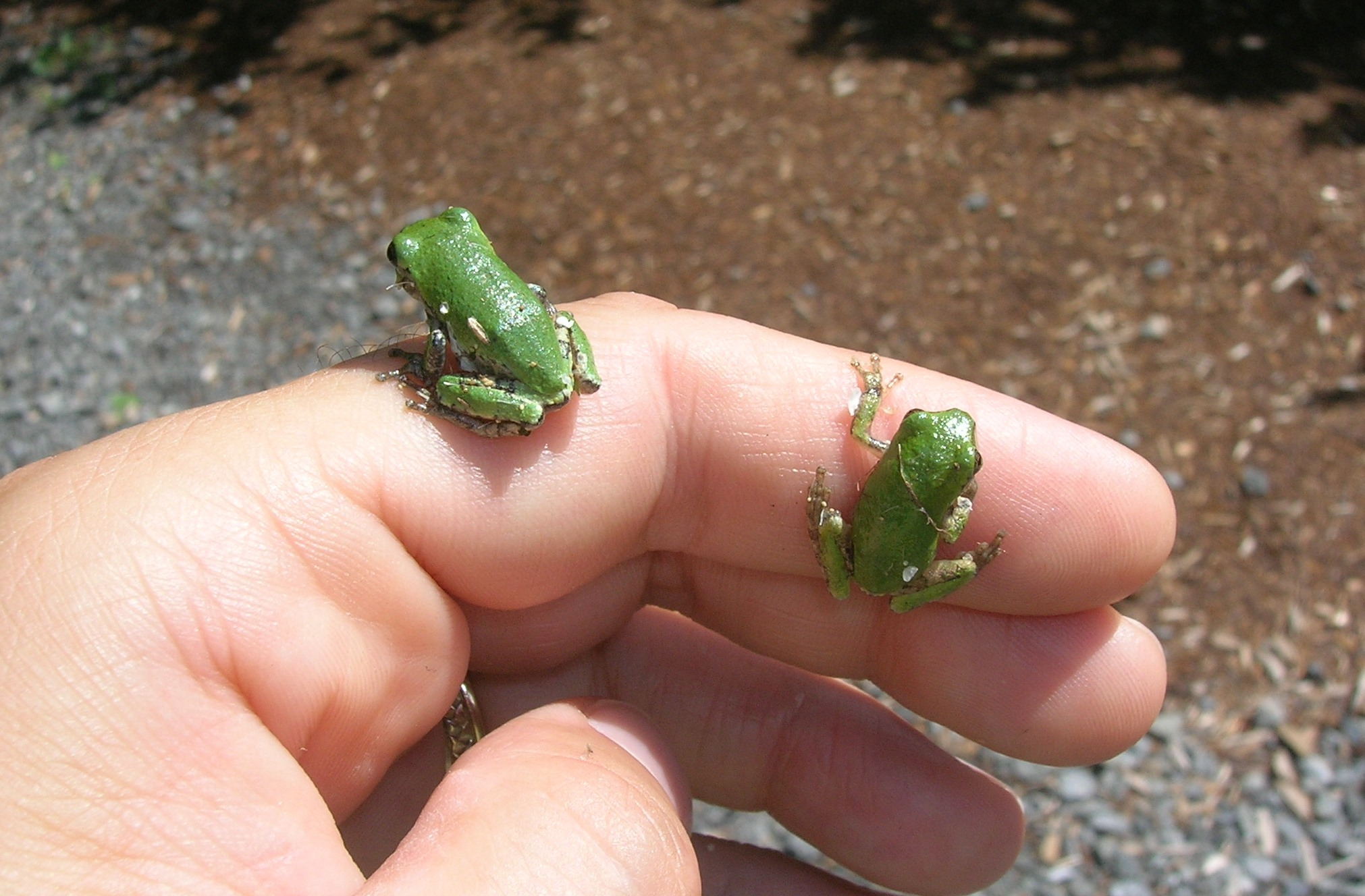
