= Franz Macoun =

Czech-German politician (1881–1951)

Franz Macoun (7 September 1881 in Nová Ves – 6 October 1951) was a Czech Social Democratic trade unionist and politician of German ethnicity. He joined the Social Democratic Party in 1899. From 1903 onwards, he was trade union organizer. Between 1920 and 1938, he served as the General Secretary of the Central Commission of German Trade Unions in the Czechoslovak Republic. Between 1929 and 1938, he was a member of the Czechoslovak National Assembly, on behalf of the German Social Democratic Workers Party in the Czechoslovak Republic. In 1938, he was arrested, following the German occupation of Czechoslovakia. In 1947, he emigrated from Prague to Sweden.
