= Jednota československých horníků a hutníků v Československé republice =

Jednota československých horníků a hutníků v Československé republice ('Unity of Czechoslovak Miners and Ironworkers of the Czechoslovak Republic') was a trade union in the First Czechoslovak Republic. As of 1929, the union claimed to have 5,893 members. The union had its headquarters in Most. It was affiliated to the Československá obec dělnická (ČOD) trade union centre. Politically, the union was tied to the Czechoslovak National Socialist Party.
