= Czechoslovak Trade Union Association =

National trade union center founded in 1897

Czechoslovak Trade Union Association (Czech: Odborové sdružení československé), abbreviated to OSČ, was a national trade union center, founded in 1897 in what was then the Austro-Hungarian Empire. With the break-up of the empire, the OSČ emerged as the major trade union force in Czechoslovakia up to the Second World War.

== Organizational history ==
=== Foundation ===
Odborové sdružení českoslovanské ('Czechoslav Trade Union Association') was founded in Prague on January 31, 1897. The OSČ represented a desire on the part of Czech trade unionists to build a Czech trade union movement separate from the Viennese Imperial Trade Union Commission (the 'Vienna Commission'), the culmination of two years of complaints by Czech trade unionists that the Vienna Commission was neglecting the Czech labour movement. The formation of OSČ did not, however, represent a total break with the Vienna Commission; several OSČ unions retained affiliations with the Vienna Commission. The founding congress was attended by 108 delegates, representing 90 trade union organizations, who met in the metalworkers' assembly hall in Karlín. Fourteen trade union organizations not represented at the congress also supported the OSČ's formation. Josef Roušar was elected its secretary. The new organization was linked to the Czechoslav Social Democratic Workers Party.

=== Competition between Prague and Vienna centres ===
The OSČ and the Vienna Commission had a complicated and vacillating relationship for several years. In 1902, the OSČ accepted that the Vienna Commission would be the sole representative of the trade union movement in the Austrian Empire to the international strike fund of the International Secretariat of National Trade Union Centres. Aside from this concession, however, the OSČ demanded autonomy for the ethnic Czech trade union movement. Yet over the next three years, several OSČ member unions, including its strongest one, the Union of Metalworkers, joined the Vienna Commission.

In 1904 Roušar was replaced as the secretary by Josef Steiner. Under Steiner's leadership, relations with the Vienna Commission worsened. In advance of the 1905 Amsterdam congress of the International Secretariat of National Trade Union Centres, the OSČ sought recognition as a separate trade union centre. The congress allowed an OSČ representative was allowed to attend as a guest but rejected the OSČ's bid for recognition.

The tensions between OSČ and the Vienna Commission peaked in 1905 and 1906. The Vienna Commission argued that the Czech autonomism was a minority standpoint within the labour movement, while the OSČ became more vocal. The OSČ began a process of regaining some unions that had been lost to the Vienna Commission from 1902 to 1905. In early 1906 the Union of Shoemakers rejoined.

=== Growth of OSČ ===
In 1909 the Union of Metalworkers rejoined OSČ. The following year unions organizing chemical workers, leatherworkers, miners and tailors followed suit. In 1910 Rudolf Tayerlé succeeded Steiner. The Vienna Commission became increasingly frustrated as the OSČ expanded its sphere of influence. By 1911 the OSČ had established a considerable following in Moravia and Silesia. This development marked a definite break with the Vienna Commission. Nevertheless, the Vienna Commission unions continued to encompass the majority of ethnic Czech workers in those regions.

=== War ===
The outbreak of the First World War in 1914 was a heavy blow to the organizational growth of the OSČ. Many union activists were drafted and sent to the battlefields. Prices of essential commodities rose, making the bargaining position of workers weaker. By the end of the year the OSČ had lost almost half of its membership. Several local structures were closed down and several OSČ publications were discontinued. Repressive measures were enacted by the government in order to forestall strikes in the strategically important mining and industrial sectors. Strikers or protesters could be punished with jail or being sent to the front.

By 1917 the tide turned. Inequalities in wage increases between ethnic German and ethnic Czech workers angered the Czech working class. In the scope of a year, the OSČ membership tripled, although membership levels still lagged behind the prewar level. Recruitment was particularly strong in heavy industries. The influx posed some organizational challenges for OSČ and coincided with a shift from craft unionism to mass industrial unionism.

=== Independence and the unity of the labour movement ===
Between April and October 1918, OSČ negotiated a possible merger with the National Socialist Československá obec dělnická (ČOD). The negotiations ended unsuccessfully because the ČOD insisted that unions should subordinate themselves to political parties.

In October 1918 the OSČ changed its name to Odborové sdružení československé ('Czechoslovak Trade Union Association'). Discussions between OSČ and Slovak Social Democratic trade unions began in December 1918. On February 2, 1919, a Regional Trade Union Council of OSČ was formed in Slovakia, with a secretariat in Ružomberok. Later a secretariat was set ut in Bratislava. In March 1919 OSČ started a Slovak-language publication, Priekopnik ('Pioneer'). By this time OSČ had a membership of 30 000 workers in Slovakia.

Also, by February 1919, the Vienna Commission union organization that were now within the boundaries of the independent Czechoslovak Republic merged into OSČ. Likewise OSČ branches in areas that were now parts of Austria had already joined Austrian unions.
