= Reichsgewerkschaftskommission =

Trade union centre

Reichsgewerkschaftskommission ('Imperial Trade Union Commission', often referred to as the Vienna Commission) was a trade union centre in the Austrian part of Austria-Hungary. The Vienna Commission was formed in December 1893. Anton Hueber was the head of the commission.

In 1928, the organisation was refounded as the Federation of Free Trade Unions in Austria, on an industrial union basis.

== See also ==
- Independent Social Democratic Party (Czech Lands)
