= Mezinárodní všeodborový svaz =

Czechoslovak trade union centre

MVS
- International All-Trade Union League
- Mezinárodní všeodborový svaz
- Founded: October 1922
- Dissolved: 1930
- Location: Czechoslovakia
- Members: 179 993 (1927)
- Affiliations: Profintern

Mezinárodní všeodborový svaz '(International All-Trade Union League', abbreviated MVS, German: Internationalen Allgewerkschaftlichen Verband, abbreviated IAV) was a national trade union centre in Czechoslovakia. MVS was founded in October 1922, after communists had been expelled from the Odborové sdružení českoslovanské (Czechoslav Trade Union Association, OSČ). MVS functioned as the trade union wing of the Communist Party of Czechoslovakia (KSČ), but parallel to MVS there were also the 'Red Trade Unions' (communist-dominated autonomous unions).

MVS affiliated itself to the Red International of Labour Unions (Profintern).

The communist trade unions (i.e. MVS and the Red Trade Unions) had a combined membership which fluctuated between 88 000-200 000. The communists were strongest amongst blue-collar workers, especially amongst Hungarians and in the agricultural sector.

By late 1927 MVS had 179 993 members, 10.71% of the unionized labour force in the country. In total MVS had 16 affiliated unions with a combined number of 2406 local trade union cells. At the time, MVS was the third largest trade union centre in Czechoslovakia.

But the relations between the MVS and KSČ were not uncomplicated. The MVS leadership had political goals of their own, somewhat different from the ambitions of the party. The MVS saw the OSČ as its main competitor, and actively encouraged workers to leave OSČ for MVS. This made the work of building communist, red, fractions inside OSČ unions more difficult for KSČ. The KSČ repeatedly demanded that MVS would cease its policy of draining the OSČ of leftwing elements, but the MVS did not yield. Partly, MVS could ignore the party demands due to disunity within the party on trade union matters.

In 1929 the relation between KSČ and MVS was broken, as the Communist International shifted from its united front policy to the class against class policy. The Red Trade Unions became the main labour front of KSČ instead. In 1930, after a brief existence as an independent trade union centre, MVS merged back into OSČ.
