= Guido Schmidt =

Austrian diplomat and politician

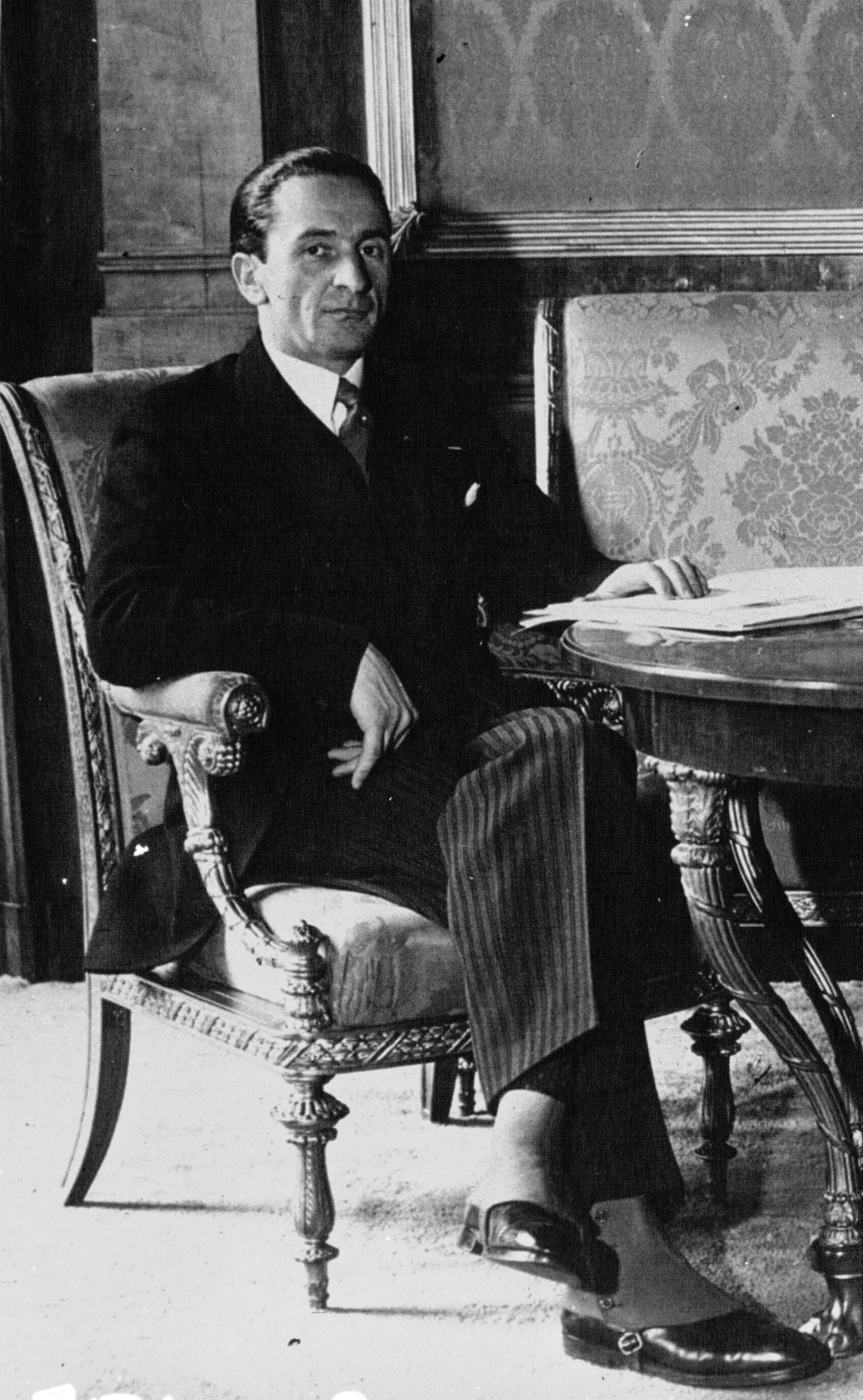

Foreign Minister of Austria
- In office 11 July 1936 – 11 March 1938
- Chancellor: Kurt Schuschnigg
- Preceded by: Kurt Schuschnigg
- Succeeded by: Wilhelm Wolf

Personal details
- Born: 15 January 1901 Bludenz, Vorarlberg, Austria-Hungary
- Died: 5 December 1957 (aged 56) Vienna, Austria
- Party: Christian Social; Fatherland's Front
- Education: University of Vienna
- Occupation: Diplomat, politician

Guido Schmidt (15 January 1901 – 5 December 1957) was an Austrian diplomat and politician, who served as Foreign Minister from 1936 to 1938.

== Life ==
Born in Bludenz, Vorarlberg, Schmidt attended the Stella Matutina Jesuit school in Feldkirch, where he befriended the later Austrian Chancellor Kurt Schuschnigg. He studied law at the University of Vienna, receiving his doctorate in 1924 and the next year he joined the Austrian diplomatic service. From 1927 he served in the office of President Wilhelm Miklas, promoted to the rank of a vice-director in 1928.

Schmidt was a member of the Christian Social Party and in 1933 joined the Fatherland's Front under Chancellor Engelbert Dollfuss. He played an important part in the conclusion of the 1936 "July Agreement" of the government of Dollfuss' successor Kurt Schuschnigg with Nazi Germany and in turn was appointed State Secretary of Foreign Affairs. He and Interior Minister Edmund Glaise-Horstenau served as a bridge to the German Nazi government. On 12 February 1938 Schuschnigg under pressure from Hitler elevated Schmidt to the rank of a Federal Minister, believing this would strengthen Austria's hand in her neogtiations with the Nazis, a post he held until 11 March 1938, when the chancellor was forced to resign only hours before the arrival of Wehrmacht troops and the Austrian Anschluss to Nazi Germany. Schmidt played a significant role in the dismissal of Chief of Staff Alfred Jansa, believing it was a concession to Berlin which could buy Austria time. After the Anschluss, he did not join the Nazi government of Arthur Seyss-Inquart, and was considered by the Austrian Nazis as "never one of us". Thereafter he retired from politics. He never joined the Nazi party nor did he ever give the Nazi salute. Nevertheless, as almost the only member of Schuschnigg's cabinet to escape a concentration camp or even worse fate, his post war reputation was irreparably compromised.

Moreover, thanks to the intercession of Hermann Göring with whom he had in 1937, on the Austrian chancellor's instruction, entered into a lengthy correspondence, to find a solution to the Austrian question, he became an executive director of the Reichswerke industrial conglomerate at Linz on 1 July 1938. In April 1941 he was made redundant in order to make way for a relation of Goering's and spent the rest of the war as a freelance industrial financial adviser.

In 1945, Schmidt was temporarily imprisoned by the Allied occupation forces because of his perceived pro-Nazi attitude but was a witness for the prosecution at the Nuremberg trials. In 1947 on his return to Austria, and with strong support from the occupying Soviet administration, he was accused of high treason, but was acquitted in 1947, successfully arguing that he had pursued policies which were supported by both Chancellor Schuschnigg and the leading figure in the Austrian Foreign Ministry, the highly respected Theodor von Hornbostel. Hornbostel who had spent much of the war in a concentration camp gave Schmidt significant supporting testimony.

From 1956 Schmidt continued his career as CEO of the Semperit company. Schmidt died in Vienna at the age of 56. He was the father of the Austrian businessman Guido Schmidt-Chiari. Schmidt's record was dogged by controversy until the end of his life but even Otto von Habsburg, who had been one of his chief critics, later softened his judgement, writing in a letter to Gordon Brook Shepherd on the 15th September 2000 that "Guido Schmidt genuinely believed he could save Austria by dealing in a friendly way with Hitler".

== Works ==
- Der Hochverratsprozess gegen Dr. Guido Schmidt; Österreichische Staatsdruckerei; Vienna, 1947
- "Playing for Time: Guido Schmidt and the Struggle for Austria" by Richard Bassett (Mount Orleans Press 2022

== See also ==
- Fatherland Front (Austria)

Political offices
| Preceded by Kurt Schuschnigg | Foreign Minister of Austria; 1936 – 1938 | Succeeded by Wilhelm Wolf |
