= Stannern (meteorite) =

Meteorite

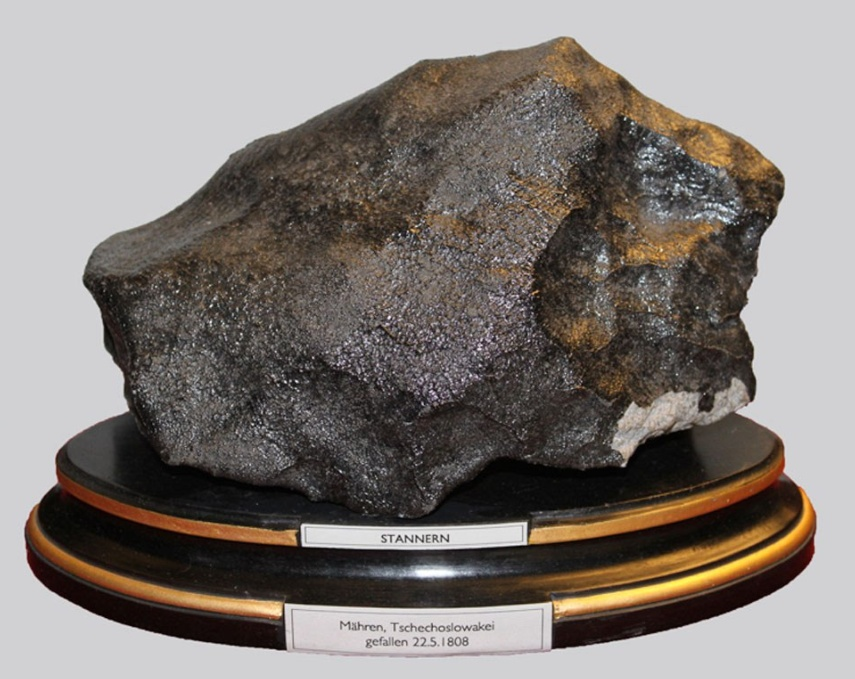
- Meteorite Stannern from the meteorite collection of the Museum of Natural History in Vienna.
- Type: Achondrite
- Class: Asteroidal achondrite
- Clan: HED meteorite
- Group: Eucrite-mmict
- Parent body: Possibly 4 Vesta
- Country: Czech Republic
- Region: Moravia
- Coordinates: 49°17′N 15°34′E
- Observed fall: Yes
- Fall date: 1808-05-22
- TKW: 52 kilograms (115 lb)
- Strewn field: Yes
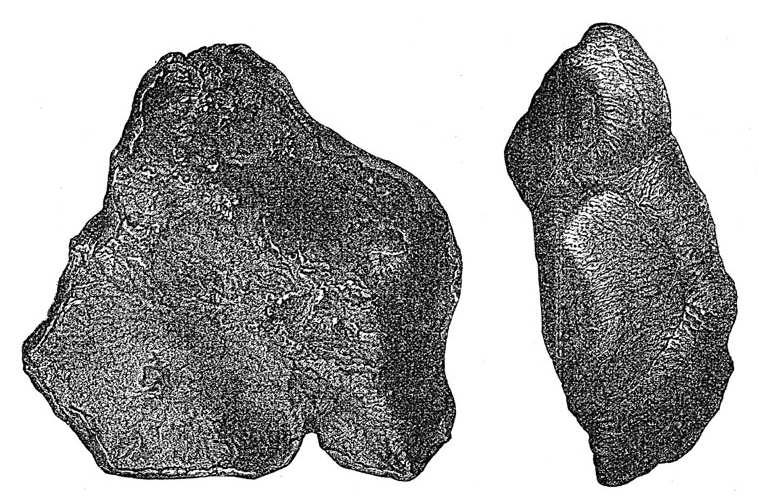
- One of the Stannern meteorites, oriented individual

Stannern meteorite fell on 22 May 1808 into the Moravian village Stonařov (in German Stannern), in today's Czech Republic.

== Classification ==
The meteorites were classified into the HED meteorite clan (possibly from asteroid 4 Vesta) and eucrite sub-group.

== The fall ==
The fall was witnessed by many and dozens of fragments were soon collected by naturalist Karl Schreibers.

The meteorite shower occurred on Sunday 22 May 1808, shortly before 06:00. The meteorites fell into an elliptic area (strewnfield) oriented north–south with height about 12.5 kilometres (7.8 mi) and width 4.8 kilometres (3.0 mi), into Stonařov and neighbouring villages (among them Otín, Cerekvička-Rosice, Dlouhá Brtnice, Hladov, Stará Říše). The event was witnessed by people on their way into the church. According to the local chronicle the fall took about 8 minutes and the number of meteorites was estimated to 200–300. No person was injured and no property was damaged.

Shortly after the fall Dr. Karl Schreibers, director of natural science collections in Vienna, arrived to the place, organized search for the fragments and thoroughly documented the event.

== Sample distribution ==
Most of the 66 found fragments weight between 32–48 grams (1.1–1.7 oz) with the largest one having over 6 kilograms (13 lb). Total recovered weight was about 52 kilograms (115 lb). The stones found their way into museums all over the world. The largest fragment is stored in the Museum of Natural History in Vienna.

== Literature ==
- Journal of Natural Philosophy, Chemistry and the Arts, volume XXV, 1810, published by William Nicholson: Analysis of the aerolite that fell on Stannern, Moravia, article by Louis Nicolas Vauquelin, p. 54-59. Google books scan
- For the 200th anniversary of the event Museum of Vysočina Region in Jihlava published proceedings about the Stonařov meteorite. The document contains, among others, contemporary records and complete list of places keeping the fragments.

== See also ==
- Glossary of meteoritics
