= Iglau language island =

Former Czechoslovak German Language Island

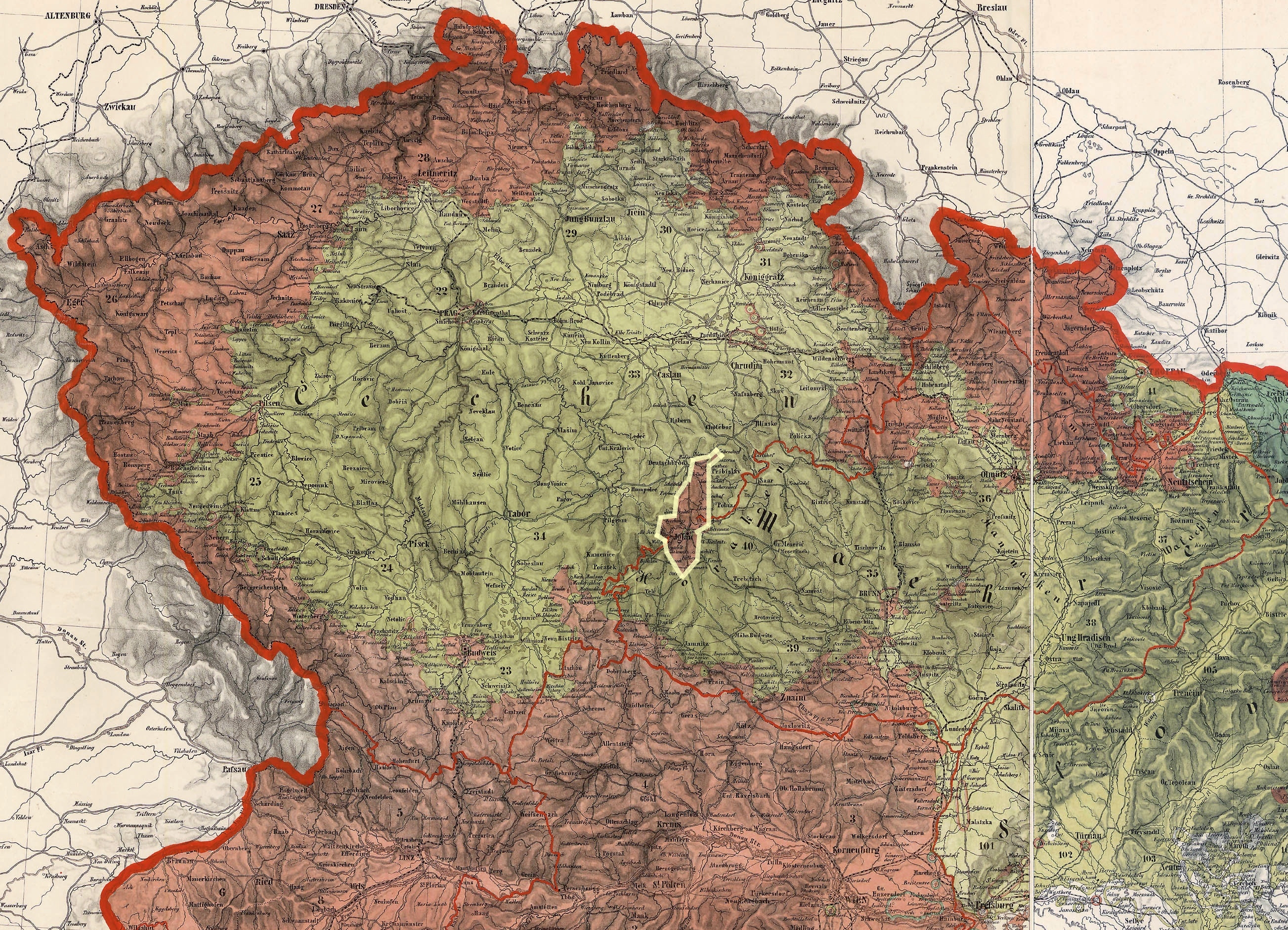
Location of the Iglau language island in the Lands of the Bohemian Crown in 1855

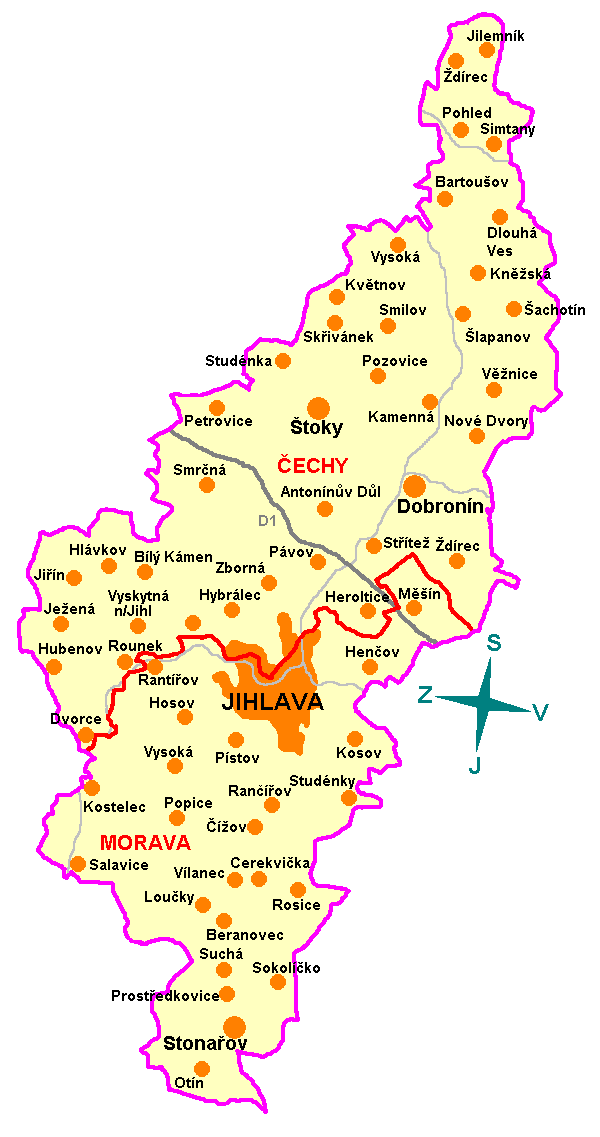
Extent of the language island

The Iglau language island or Jihlava language island (German: Iglauer Sprachinsel, Czech: Jihlavský jazykový ostrov) was a German language island in present-day Czech Republic, located on the border between Bohemia and Moravia. The area included 79 settlements on an area of about 43 × 18 km around the city of Jihlava (German: Iglau). Other centres were the municipalities of Stonařov (German: Stannern) and Štoky (German: Stöcken).

== German settlement ==
The settlement of Germans dates back to silver mining in the Iglau mountains in the Middle Ages. Here, as in other places in Medieval Central and Eastern Europe, mining was based on German-speaking skilled workers. From 1233 a document is preserved in which the Teutonic Order sold the Iglau church estates to the Seeau Monastery. In 1249, Wenceslaus I and Ottokar II, then Margrave of Moravia confirmed the Iglau Mining Law, which became formative for Central European mining and also the South American possessions of Spain. In the dispute for the imperial crown against Rudolf I, Ottokar II lost his life in the Battle on the Marchfeld. To reconcile, the victorious Rudolf married his children to children of Ottokar, whose weddings were celebrated in 1271 in Iglau.

The Reformation quickly established itself in Iglau and its surroundings, especially through the preaching of Paulus Speratus from Ellwangen. The only Meistersinger school in the Czech lands was founded in Iglau. After the Battle of White Mountain, Iglau was also occupied by imperial forces. The Protestant clergy were expelled and the population was given a deadline of six weeks to become Catholic or emigrate. From 1645 to 1647 Swedish troops occupied Iglau. The imperial forces besieged the city and eventually recaptured it.

As a result of forced emigration from the region as a consequence of recatholization, Iglau lost its importance, however, a second wave of German immigration followed. In the 15th century, Jihlava had a vast majority German-speaking population with only about 10 percent Czech-speaking inhabitants.

== 19th and first half of the 20th century ==
At the end of the 19th century population shifts with Germans moving from the villages of the language island to the city of Iglau, while people from Iglau moved to other towns, especially Vienna, changed the population composition of the language island. Czech-speaking immigrants moved into the villages which had been left by German-speakers. According to the results of the 1910 census, there were 21,756 German speakers and 5,974 Czechs living in Iglau alone, and about 18,400 Germans and 6,100 Czechs in other municipalities of the language island.

During World War I, the first significant tensions arose between Czechs and Germans. On 3 November 1918, the German deputies of the Austrian Imperial Council claimed the territory of the language island for German Austria. As a result of the negotiations leading to the Treaty of Saint-Germain, to which German and Austrian representatives were not admitted, Iglau, like all of Bohemia and Moravia, was annexed to the Czechoslovak state.

The Czech state aimed to distribute large estates more fairly, but this usually resulted in the transfer of German property to Czech ownership. The Hohenzollern property in Iglau was transferred to Czech cooperatives, which hired mainly Czechs as workers. In the municipal administration, mainly Germans were dismissed or transferred to the Czech-speaking area. In the school system, smaller German schools were forced to close, while Czech-language schools were established in places without a significant Czech-speaking population. The ratio of the two nationalities therefore shifted to two-thirds German and one-third Czech. As a result of the National Socialist aggression, Iglau became part of the Protectorate of Bohemia and Moravia. Now many inhabitants of Iglau, who had previously called themselves Czechs, declared themselves Germans.

== After World War II ==
On 9 May, the Red Army moved in, together with partly self-declared Czech partisans. Residents were forbidden to lock their houses. Germans were not allowed to use public transportation and had to wear armbands. German merchants had to close their stores. Some of the Iglau Czechs tried to help the Germans. Germans had to line up in squares and were abused.

Between the 23rd and 26th in Iglau, Germans were expelled from their homes in districts, and driven on foot to the Austrian border. In July 1945, Germans from the municipalities of the language island were also expelled from their homes and shipped to internment camps or assigned to forced labor. Internment camps for Germans existed in the Jihlava parts of Helenín (German: Iglau-Helenenthal), Horní Kosov (German: Obergoß), Staré Hory (German: Altenberg) and Bedřichov u Jihlavy (German: Friedrichsdorf), and in Stonařov (German: Stannern) and Bartoušov (German: Pattersdorf).

== Today ==
A museum of local history of Iglau is located in Hellenstein Castle. In the Vysočina Jihlava Museum it is only noted that in 1946 the deportation of the Jihlava Germans was completed. Waldkirchen an der Thaya has a memorial to the victims of Iglau who had died on the march from Iglau to Austria.
