= Juliabkommen =

Agreement between Nazi Germany and Austria

The Juliabkommen ("July Agreement") was an agreement—officially, a gentleman's agreement—between the Federal State of Austria and Nazi Germany signed on 11 July 1936. The agreement was not initially published. It was negotiated by the German ambassador, Franz von Papen, and the Austrian chancellor, Kurt von Schuschnigg.

Austro-German relations had been strained since the German-backed putsch of 25 July 1934. The impetus for a rapprochement came from Fascist Italy, which, by 1936, was pursuing its own rapprochement with Germany over the latter's support for its invasion of Ethiopia. This left Austria diplomatically isolated. The agreement was the result of Italo-German pressure. Schuschnigg personally took over negotiations after a meeting with Benito Mussolini on 5–6 June 1936 at Rocca delle Caminate.

The agreement had ten articles. Germany recognized Austria's "full sovereignty". It promised not to intervene in Austria's internal affairs and to cease support for Austrian National Socialism. In return, Austria promised amnesty to incarcerated National Socialists and to bring two into the government. Germany agreed to lift the thousand-mark ban, while Austria agreed to align its foreign policy to that of Germany—the deutsche Weg (German way). The agreement also covered joint administration of the press and common cultural goals. Austria agreed that it was a "German state".

As a result of the agreement, Schuschnigg appointed the Nazis Edmund Glaise-Horstenau and Guido Schmidt as minister without portfolio and foreign minister, respectively. The Austrian National Socialist party remained illegal and Germany pursued its aims by less confrontational means. On 23 October 1936, the Italo-German rapprochement culminated in a nine-point protocol, which included Italian acceptance of the new Austro-German status quo. From the Austrian perspective, the agreement was a failure. Less than two years later, Germany annexed Austria.
