= Thousand-mark ban =

1933 economic sanction imposed on Austria by the German Reich government

The thousand-mark ban was an economic sanction imposed on Austria by the German Reich government on May 29, 1933, which came into effect on July 1, 1933. Henceforth, German citizens had to pay a fee of 1,000 ℛ︁ℳ︁ (equivalent to €4635 in 2017) to the German Reich before any travel to or through Austria, except for small border traffic. The payment of the fee was noted in the passport and was therefore easy to check. Likewise, because of the widespread visa requirement in Europe upon re-entry, a clandestine entry into Austria via detours could be recognized immediately.

The aim was to weaken the Austrian economy, which was already heavily dependent on tourism at that time. The ban was lifted after the Juliabkommen.

== History ==
=== Causes & consequences ===
The ban was intended to bring about the overthrow of Chancellor Engelbert Dollfuss, who by then was already acting in a dictatorial manner. The pretended trigger was the expulsion of the Bavarian Minister of Justice Hans Frank from Austria. Frank was one of the leading National Socialists in the German Reich and belonged to Hitler's Old Guard. His expulsion took place after he had threatened, in a speech in Graz on May 15, 1933, that the German government would actively interfere in Austrian domestic politics since Austria was a “part of Germany”.

The financial hurdle proved effective. The percentage of German tourists in Austria for tourism in 1932 was around 40%. The total number of overnight stays fell from 19.9 million in 1932 to 16.5 million the following year. The lowest was reached in 1934 with 15.9 million overnight stays. In Tyrol alone, overnight stays fell from 4.4 million (in 1929/1933) to 500,000 (in 1933/38). The lockdown also had a massive impact on the university level and various Austrian establishments like the first cable car in Tyrol (de:Tiroler Zugspitzbahn) which was developed by Dr. Hermann Stern.

In more recent historiography, the effect of the ban is put into perspective. On one hand, the effects of the global economic crisis that began at the end of the 1920s reached their peak at the same time. On the other hand, the ban offered "a crystallization point at which the abstract problem of a fundamental economic crisis, which the average citizen cannot concretely understand, could be discussed."

== See also ==
- Austro-German relations
- Anschluss
- Juliabkommen
- Economic sanctions
