= Border area =

The border between the United Kingdom and the European Union in Ireland

The border area is the area immediately adjacent to the border of a country. In addition to the informal definition, a border area may have a legal definition and delineation, both domestically and due to bilateral agreements. Reasons for legal definition of a border area include enhanced security and special provisions for the residents of border areas to cross the border (local border traffic).

== China ==
In China, during the Chinese Civil War, many of the areas controlled by the Chinese Communist Party were called "Border Areas" (simplified Chinese: 边区; traditional Chinese: 邊區), because they were in remote districts on the borders of two or more provinces. They are also known by the names of "Border Regions" and "Liberated Areas" in English. Examples include the Shaan-Gan-Ning Border Region and the neighbouring Jin-Cha-Ji Border Region in northern China.

== European Union ==
In Germany, within the framework of the European Union Customs Union, the border area (German: grenznahe Raum) extends on the German part of the customs border of the Community to a depth of 30 kilometers, from the seaward border of the customs territory of the Community to a depth of 50 kilometers.

For Schengen States, a regulation for local border traffic at external borders define a border area which may extend to a maximum of 50 kilometres (31 mi) on either side of the border. An exception is made for Kaliningrad Oblast, see "Poland–Russia border" article for details.

== Soviet Union ==
In the Soviet Union, the regime of the use of land, water, forests, entrails, other arable lands, navigation, fishing, rafting and other works is defined by the border area regime. If necessary, a border zone is established within the administrative unit (city, region, settlement, village) within the territory adjacent to the USSR state border or the coast guard by border troops, where a special border regime is introduced. The border troops carry out tasks of guarding the state border in that zone. In addition, along the USSR state border, on its land or border. A boundary layer (not more than 2 km wide) is established along the banks of rivers, lakes and other reservoirs, where additional restrictions are imposed in accordance with the procedure established by the border regime. The entire strip (including rivers, lakes and islands) is under the exclusive control of the USSR Armed Forces. A logging layer 4–5 m wide can be established along the border.

During the Interbellum and post-World War II periods, the border areas were subject to severe ethnic cleansing of nationals of "potentially hostile" ethnicities; see Population transfer in the Soviet Union and Forced settlements in the Soviet Union#Deportations from border territories in 1939–1941 for details.

== United States ==
In the United States, a 100-mile border zone from the border was created, in which Customs and Border Protection’s officials have authority for stop and search (see also: 100-mile zone at the Mexico–United States border).

== See also ==
- March (territory) or "mark", border regions, of importance in the Medieval history of various countries
- Marquis and Marquess, originally titles of nobles whose jurisdiction was a March or mark
