= Edmund Glaise-Horstenau =

Austrian military officer and Nazi politician

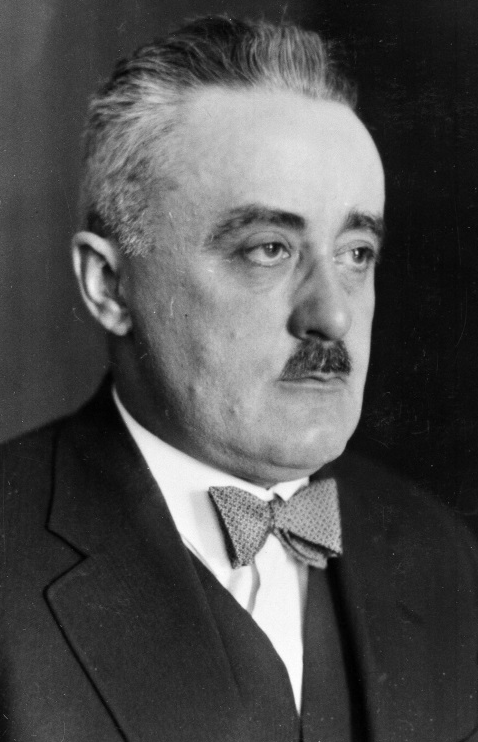
- Glaise-Horstenau portrait by Max Fenichel, c. 1938

Plenipotentiary General to Croatia
- In office April 1941 – 25 September 1944

Vice-Chancellor of Austria
- In office 11 March 1938 – 13 March 1938
- Chancellor: Arthur Seyß-Inquart
- Preceded by: Ludwig Hülgerth
- Succeeded by: Adolf Schärf (1945)

Minister of the Interior
- In office 6 November 1936 – 16 February 1938
- Chancellor: Kurt Schuschnigg
- Preceded by: Eduard Baar-Baarenfels
- Succeeded by: Arthur Seyß-Inquart

Personal details
- Born: Edmund Glaise von Horstenau; 27 February 1882 Braunau am Inn, Austria-Hungary
- Died: 20 July 1946 (aged 64) Nuremberg, Bavaria, Allied-occupied Germany
- Party: Nazi Party
- Education: University of Vienna
- Profession: Military officer

Military service
- Allegiance: Austria-Hungary; Federal State of Austria; Nazi Germany
- Branch/service: Austro-Hungarian Army; Austrian Armed Forces; German Army
- Years of service: 1914-18 1934-1938 1938-1945
- Rank: General der Infanterie
- Battles/wars: First World War; Second World War
- Awards: German Cross in silver; Knight's Cross of the War Merit Cross with swords

Edmund Glaise von Horstenau, also known as Edmund Glaise-Horstenau (27 February 1882 – 20 July 1946) was an Austrian Nazi politician who became the last vice-chancellor of Austria, appointed by Chancellor Kurt Schuschnigg under pressure from Adolf Hitler, shortly before the 1938 Anschluss.

During the Second World War, Glaise-Horstenau became a General der Infanterie in the German Wehrmacht and served as Plenipotentiary General to the Independent State of Croatia. Dismayed by the atrocities committed by the Ustaše, he was involved in the Lorković-Vokić plot, with the purpose of overthrowing Ante Pavelić's regime and replacing it with a pro-Allied government. Removed from his post in September 1944, he was captured at the end of the war and committed suicide while in custody.

== Austrian military and political career ==
Born in Braunau am Inn, the son of a military officer, Glaise-Horstenau attended the Theresian Military Academy from age eleven. After graduating from the military academy, he became a general staff officer in the Salzburg Brigade of the Austro-Hungarian Army and joined the Vienna War Archives as an Hauptmann in 1913. At the outbreak of World War I in 1914, he was initially on the staff of the 11th Infantry Division, then became a general staff officer in the 88th Kaiserschützen Brigade. From June 1915 until the end of the war, he served as press and political advisor in the Army High Command. After the war, Glaise-Horstenau studied history at the University of Vienna, and was employed at the Austrian War Archives (as director from 1925 to 1938). He attained the rank of Oberst in the Austrian Heeres-Nachrichtenamt (military intelligence service) in 1934.

Originally a monarchist, Glaise-Horstenau became the second man in the hierarchy of the banned Austrian Nazi Party in the mid-to-late 1930s under its leader Josef Leopold. To improve relations with Nazi Germany, he was appointed a member of the Staatsrat (state council) of the Federal State of Austria from 1934 as a minister without portfolio, and from 1936 to 1938, he served as minister of the interior in the cabinet of Chancellor Kurt Schuschnigg, after being appointed under pressure from Adolf Hitler following the Juliabkommen. At the meeting at the Berghof in Berchtesgaden on 12 February 1938 between Hitler and Schuschnigg, Germany demanded that Glaise-Horstenau be made minister of war in a new pro-Nazi government and that he would establish close operational relations between the German and Austrian armies, which would ultimately lead to the assimilation of the Austrian to the German system.

== Post-Anschluss career ==
After Schuschnigg was forced to resign on 11 March, Glaise-Horstenau served as vice-chancellor of Austria under Arthur Seyß-Inquart for two days. After the Anschluss of 12 March 1938, he transferred into the German Wehrmacht where he subsequently was promoted to Generalmajor (March 1941), Generalleutnant (August 1942) and General der Infanterie (September 1943). At the 10 April 1938 parliamentary election, he secured a seat as a deputy to the Reichstag from Ostmark and retained this seat until the fall of the Nazi regime. In 1940, he became a professor of army and military history at the University of Vienna. A member of the Nazi paramilitary Sturmabteilung (SA) since 1938, he was promoted to SA-Gruppenführer in 1943.

=== Assignment in Croatia ===
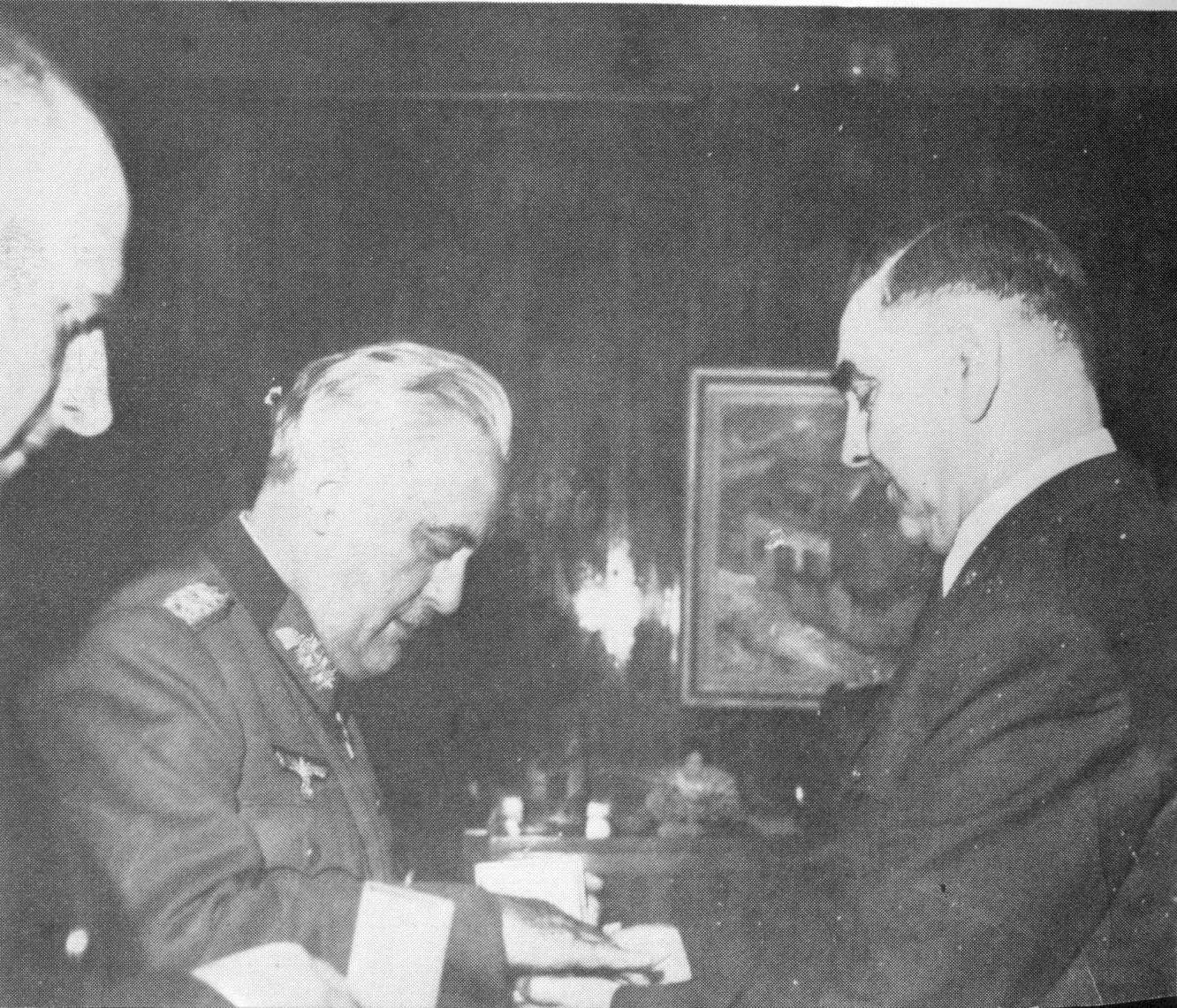
Siegfried Kasche, von Horstenau and Ante Pavelić in Zagreb.

On 14 April 1941, Glaise-Horstenau was appointed as Germany's Plenipotentiary General to the Independent State of Croatia. There, he was shocked by the atrocities of the Ustaše (Croatian fascist paramilitaries), which he repeatedly denounced and opposed. As early as 28 June 1941, he reported the following to the German High Command, the Oberkommando der Wehrmacht (OKW):

...according to reliable reports from countless German military and civil observers during the last few weeks the Ustaše have gone raging mad.

On 10 July, he added:

Our troops have to be mute witnesses of such events; it does not reflect well on their otherwise high reputation.... I am frequently told that German occupation troops would finally have to intervene against Ustaše crimes. This may happen eventually. Right now, with the available forces, I could not ask for such action. Ad hoc intervention in individual cases could make the German Army look responsible for countless crimes which it could not prevent in the past.

The lack of response from the OKW at Glaise-Horstenau's criticism of the Ustaše's methods increasingly frustrated him and caused deep tension with Ante Pavelić, the poglavnik, or head, of the Independent State of Croatia. By 1944, he had grown so dismayed at the atrocities that he had witnessed that he became deeply implicated in the Lorković-Vokić plot to overthrow Pavelić's regime and to replace it with a pro-Allied government.

The subsequent failure of that attempt turned Glaise-Horstenau into persona non grata for both the Croatians and the Nazis. In the first week of September, Pavelić and German ambassador Siegfried Kasche conspired together and effected his removal on 25 September. Glaise-Horstenau's withdrawal from the scene opened the door for the total politicalization of the Croatian armed forces, which occurred over the next several months. Glaise-Horstenau was then assigned to the Führerreserve and entrusted with the obscure task of military historian of the southeast theater until his capture by the US Army on 5 May 1945. During the war years, he was awarded the German Cross in silver and the Knight's Cross of the War Merit Cross with swords.

== Post-war life and suicide ==
Glaise-Horstenau was interned in prisoner of war camps, wrote an autobiography and testified as a defense witness for Seyss-Inquart at the Nuremberg trials. Fearing extradition to Yugoslavia or Austria, he committed suicide at Langwasser military camp near Nuremberg, on 20 July 1946.

== Publications ==
- The collapse of the Austro-Hungarian empire, translated by Ian F.D. Morrow, London, Toronto: J.M. Dent, 1930 (Die Katastrophe, Die Zertrümmerung Österreich-Ungarns und das Werden der Nachfolgestaaten, Amalthea Verlag, Zürich-Leipzig-Wien, 1929)
- Österreich-Ungarns letzter Krieg, 7 volumes, 1931–1935
- Edmund Glaise von Horstenau: Ein General im Zwielicht: die Erinnerungen Edmund Glaises von Horstenau, Volume 76, Böhlau, 1988, ISBN 9783205087496

== Sources ==
- Peter Broucek (Eingel. und hrsg.): Ein General im Zwielicht. Die Erinnerungen Edmund Glaises von Horstenau. Böhlau, Wien u.a. 1980 ff.

- Band 1: K.u.k. Generalstabsoffizier und Historiker (= Veröffentlichungen der Kommission für Neuere Geschichte Österreichs. Bd. 67). 1980, ISBN 3-205-08740-2.
- Band 2: Minister im Ständestaat und General im OKW (= Veröffentlichungen der Kommission für Neuere Geschichte Österreichs. Bd. 70). 1983, ISBN 3-205-08743-7.
- Band 3: Deutscher Bevollmächtigter General in Kroatien und Zeuge des Untergangs des "Tausendjährigen Reiches" (= Veröffentlichungen der Kommission für Neuere Geschichte Österreichs. Bd. 76). 1988, ISBN 3-205-08749-6.

- "Glaise von Horstenau Edmund". In: Österreichisches Biographisches Lexikon 1815–1950 (ÖBL). Vol. 2, Austrian Academy of Sciences, Vienna 1959, p. 1.
- Rudolf Kiszling (1964). "Glaise von Horstenau, Edmund". Neue Deutsche Biographie (in German). Vol. 6. Berlin: Duncker & Humblot. pp. 423–424. (full text online).
- Klee, Ernst (2007). Das Personenlexikon zum Dritten Reich. Wer war was vor und nach 1945. Frankfurt-am-Main: Fischer-Taschenbuch-Verlag. ISBN 978-3-596-16048-8.
- Österreichisches Staatsarchiv, Mitteilungen des österreichischen Staatsarchivs, Band 47, 1999.
- Webb, James Jack (2024). Generals and Admirals of the Third Reich: For Country or Fuehrer. Vol. 1: A–G. Havertown, PA: Casemate Publishers. ISBN 978-1-952-71512-9.
