= Local border traffic =

Cross-border traffic of residents of a border area

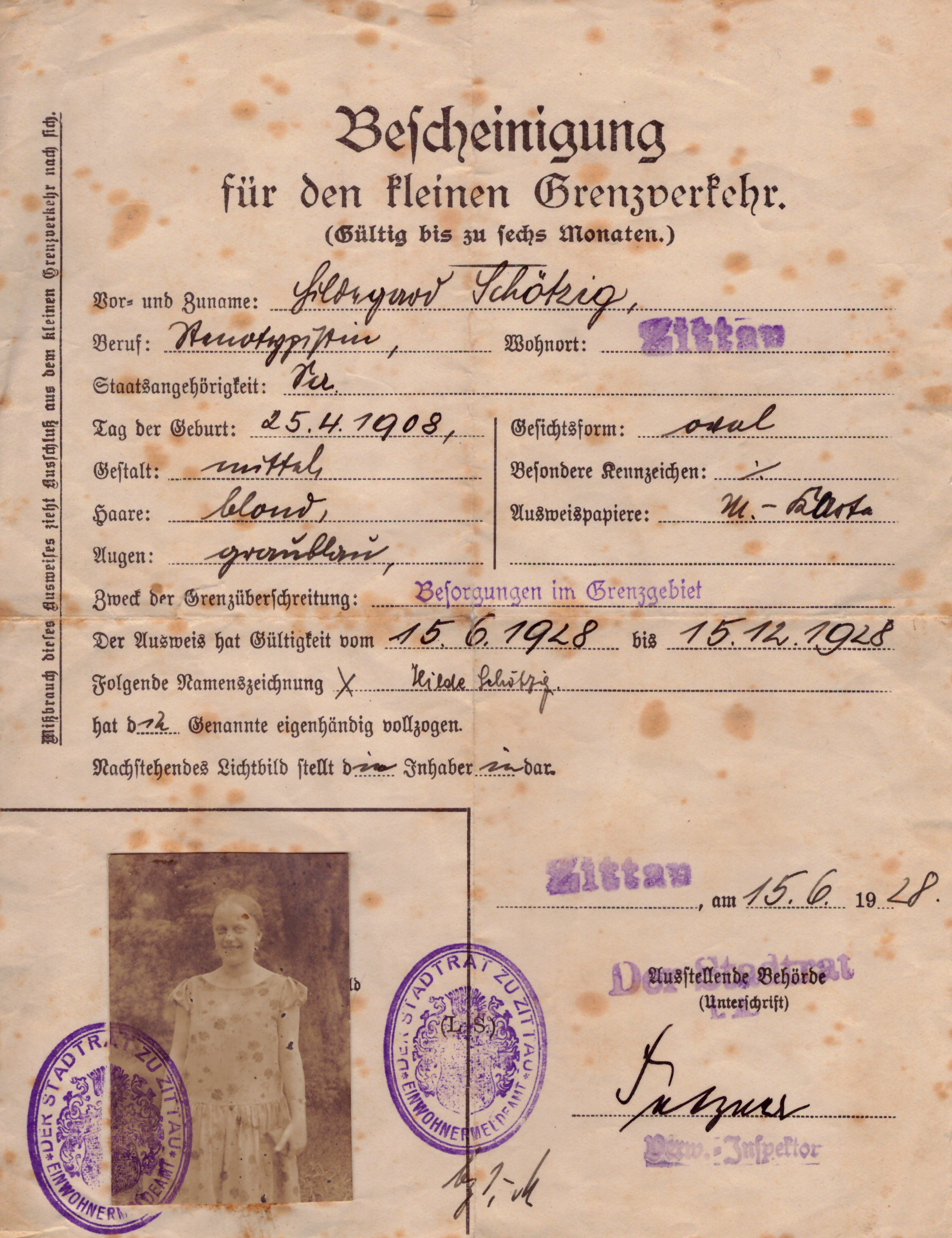
A 1928 small border traffic permit for travel between the Free State of Saxony and Czechoslovakia

The local border traffic or small border traffic is cross-border traffic of residents of a border area. In many cases local border traffic is subject to bilateral regulation aimed at the simplification of border crossing for these residents.

Often, additional border crossing points are created to carry only local border traffic.

== Brexit and Northern Ireland ==
The border between the United Kingdom and the European Union in Ireland

The UK left the EU following Brexit. The open border between Northern Ireland and Ireland created a problem of a porous external EU border. Article 3 of the Northern Ireland Protocol retained the Common Travel Area for citizens of the UK to enter the EU via Ireland freely.

== European Union ==
The European Union rules on local border traffic were established by Regulation (EC) No 1931/2006 of the European Parliament and of the Council of 20 December 2006.

== Former Yugoslavia ==
Of the former Communist states, citizens of Yugoslavia enjoyed a significant freedom of international movement. In 1960, local border traffic on the Yugoslavia — Italy border in Istria registered almost seven million crossings in both directions. In 1977 Yugoslavia had 55 local border traffic agreements with the neighboring countries, including 7 with Italy, 11 with Austria, 8 with Hungary, 10 with Romania, 8 with Bulgaria, 5 with Greece.

== See also ==
- Border control § Expedited border controls
- Thousand-mark ban
