= Ludwig Hülgerth =

Austrian field marshal and politician

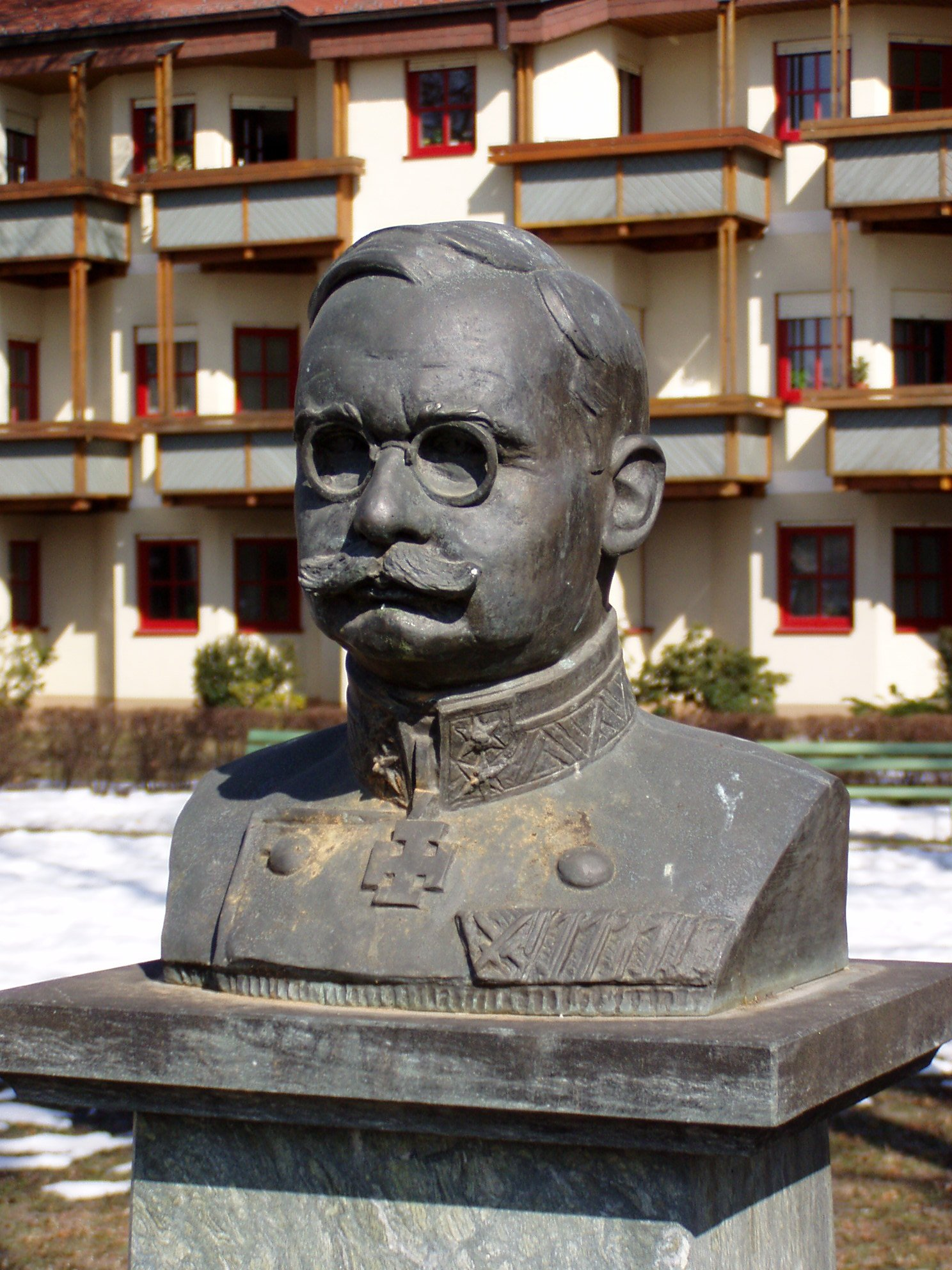
- Bust of Ludwig Hülgerth in Klagenfurt

Vice-Chancellor of Austria
- In office 3 November 1936 – 11 March 1938
- Chancellor: Kurt Schuschnigg
- Preceded by: Eduard Baar-Baarenfels
- Succeeded by: Edmund Glaise-Horstenau

Personal details
- Born: Ludwig Hülgerth; 26 January 1875 Vienna, Austria-Hungary
- Died: 13 August 1939 (aged 64) Sankt Georgen am Längsee, Nazi Germany

Ludwig Hülgerth (26 January 1875 – 13 August 1939) was an Austrian Field Marshal and politician.

The son of a career soldier, Hülgerth joined the military at a young age. He fought in the First World War on three fronts, where he rose to the rank of lieutenant colonel. In 1927, he retired as a Major General, and received the rank of Field Marshal in 1934.

Hülgerth went into politics in 1934, when he became governor of Carinthia. He became the head of the Fatherland Front militia in 1936, and that same year became Vice-Chancellor under Kurt Schuschnigg.

Hülgerth died in 1939 at his father-in-law's estate in Sankt Georgen am Längsee.
