= Hladov =

- Municipality
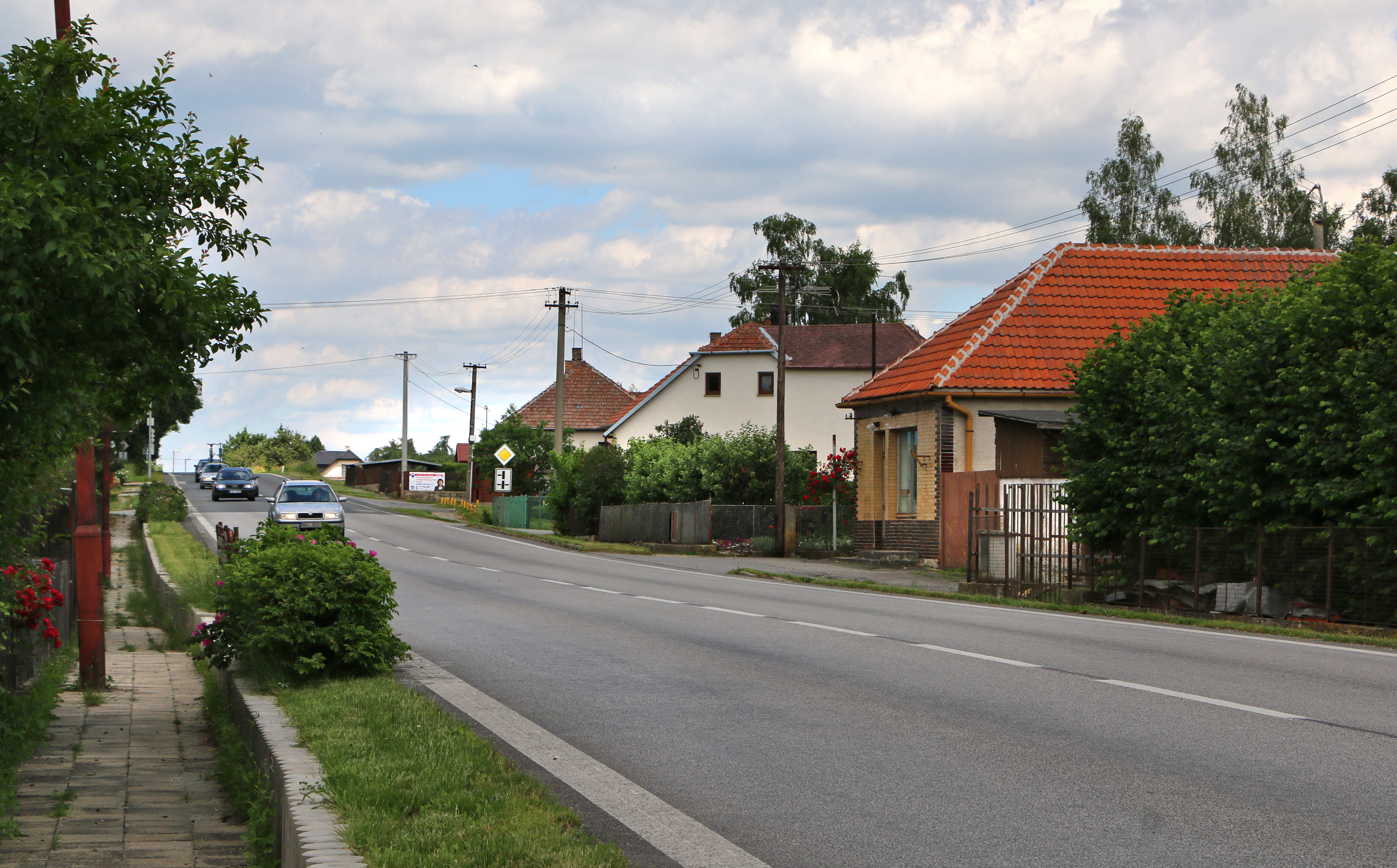
- Main road

- Location in the Czech Republic
- Coordinates: 49°12′53″N 15°36′41″E
- Country: Czech Republic
- Region: Vysočina
- District: Jihlava
- First mentioned: 1257

Area
  - Total: 5.84 km^{2} (2.25 sq mi)
- Elevation: 653 m (2,142 ft)

Population (2026-01-01)
  - Total: 173
  - Density: 29.6/km^{2} (76.7/sq mi)
- Time zone: UTC+1 (CET)
  - Summer (DST): UTC+2 (CEST)
- Postal code: 588 33
- Website: www.hladov.cz

Hladov (Czech pronunciation: [ˈɦladof]; German: Hungerleiden) is a municipality and village in Jihlava District in the Vysočina Region of the Czech Republic. It has about 200 inhabitants.

Hladov lies approximately 21 kilometres (13 mi) south of Jihlava and 131 km (81 mi) south-east of Prague.

== Demographics ==
Historical population
Year	Pop.	±%
1869	268	—
1880	289	+7.8%
1890	276	−4.5%
1900	303	+9.8%
1910	345	+13.9%
1921	311	−9.9%
1930	278	−10.6%
1950	256	−7.9%
1961	261	+2.0%
1970	214	−18.0%
1980	175	−18.2%
1991	125	−28.6%
2001	130	+4.0%
2011	151	+16.2%
2021	170	+12.6%
Source: Censuses
