= Stonařov =

- Market town
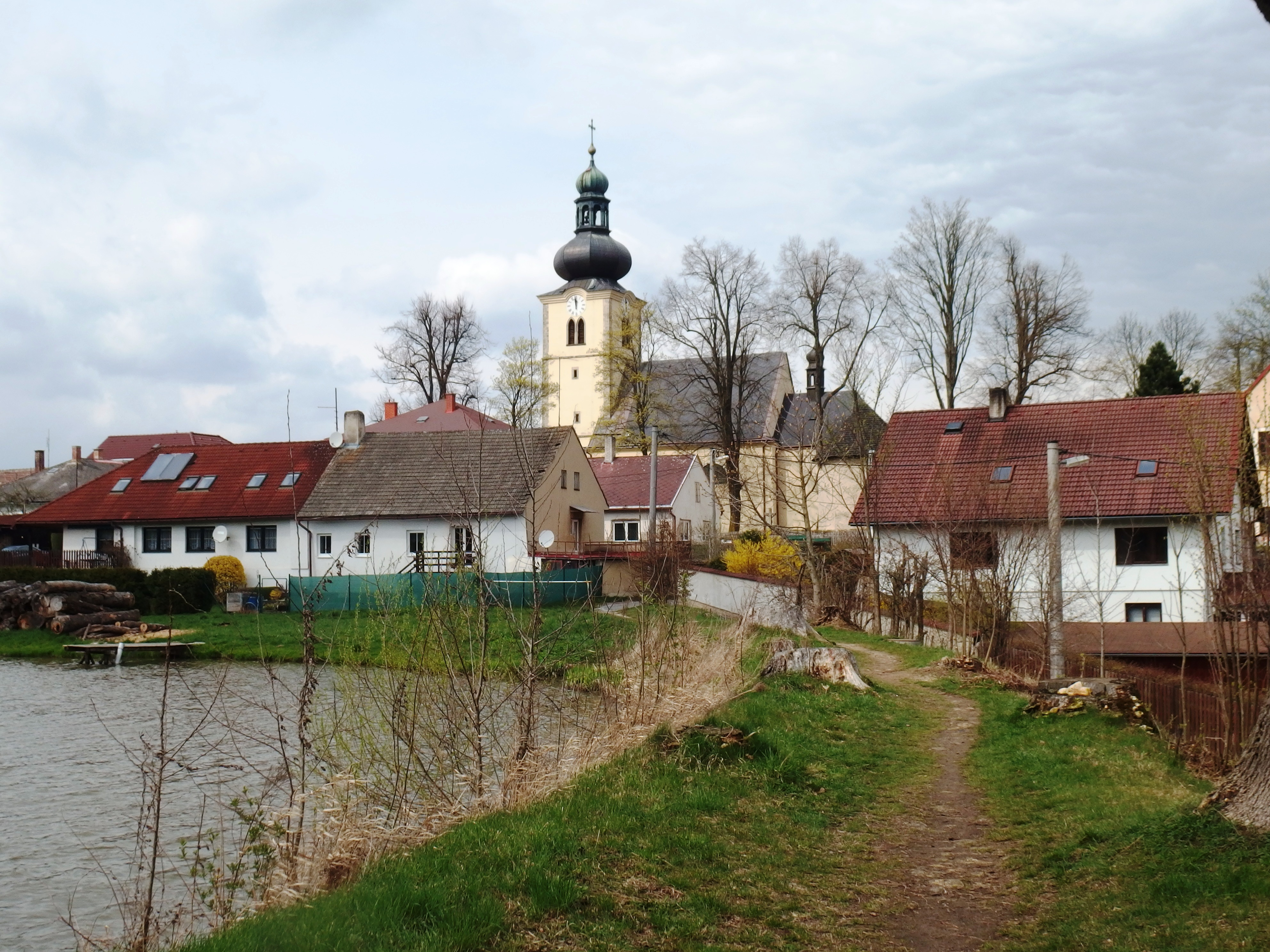
- Church of Saint Wenceslaus

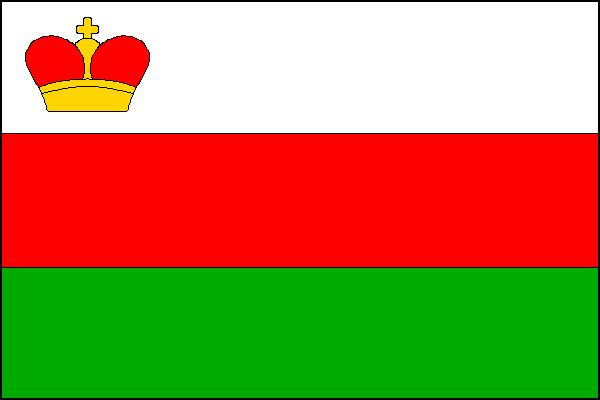
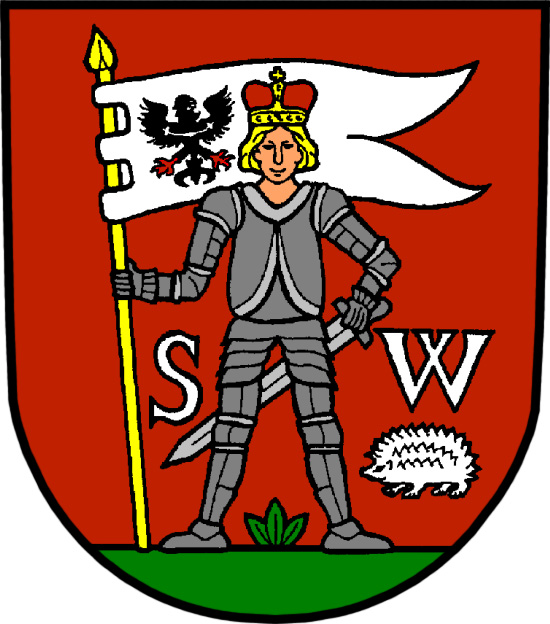
- Flag Coat of arms

- Location in the Czech Republic
- Coordinates: 49°16′56″N 15°35′8″E
- Country: Czech Republic
- Region: Vysočina
- District: Jihlava
- First mentioned: 1347

Area
  - Total: 13.56 km^{2} (5.24 sq mi)
- Elevation: 580 m (1,900 ft)

Population (2026-01-01)
  - Total: 1,075
  - Density: 79.28/km^{2} (205.3/sq mi)
- Time zone: UTC+1 (CET)
  - Summer (DST): UTC+2 (CEST)
- Postal code: 588 33
- Website: www.stonarov.cz

Stonařov (Czech pronunciation: [ˈstonar̝of]; German: Stannern) is a market town in Jihlava District in the Vysočina Region of the Czech Republic. It has about 1,100 inhabitants.

== Administrative division ==
Stonařov consists of two municipal parts (in brackets population according to the 2021 census):

- Stonařov (1,065)
- Sokolíčko (5)

== Geography ==
Stonařov is located about 13 kilometres (8 mi) south of Jihlava. It lies in the Křižanov Highlands. The highest point is at 666 m (2,185 ft) above sea level. The Jihlávka Stream flows through the market town. The municipal territory is rich in small fishponds. The fishpond Dolní Jarošův rybník is located inside the built-up area.

== History ==
The first written mention of Stonařov is from 1347. The settlement was established in the early 13th century. In 1367 it received market town privileges.

Peasant rebellions in 1712–1722 were suppressed. The main trade and post road between Prague and Vienna built in 1750 went through Stonařov. On 22 May 1808 the place was hit by the Stannern meteorite.

Agriculture and small-scale textile production were the main sources of income, though at the end of the 19th century two textile manufacturies were built here. The municipality was damaged by large fires in 1900 and 1901. Before World War I, the place was a target of tourists from Vienna. The German-speaking inhabitants were expelled after the end of World War II.

== Demographics ==
Historical population

Year	Pop.	±%
1869	1,856	—
1880	1,878	+1.2%
1890	1,725	−8.1%
1900	1,505	−12.8%
1910	1,451	−3.6%

Year	Pop.	±%
1921	1,371	−5.5%
1930	1,318	−3.9%
1950	1,014	−23.1%
1961	1,115	+10.0%
1970	1,011	−9.3%

Year	Pop.	±%
1980	993	−1.8%
1991	926	−6.7%
2001	926	+0.0%
2011	1,026	+10.8%
2021	1,070	+4.3%

Source: Censuses

== Transport ==
The I/38 road (part of the European route E59) from Jihlava to Znojmo runs through Stonařov.

== Sights ==
The main landmark of Stonařov is the Church of Saint Wenceslaus. It has a Gothic core from the 13th century. The original church was rebuilt in the Renaissance style in 1591. The nave was later rebuilt in the Baroque style, but the tower remained Renaissance. Part of the church is a unique Romanesque charnel house from the mid-13th century.

== Honours ==
The asteroid 61208 Stonařov was named after the market town on 1 June 2007.

== Notable people ==
- Arthur Seyss-Inquart (1892–1946), Austrian Nazi politician
