= Arthur Seyss-Inquart =

Austrian Nazi politician (1892–1946)

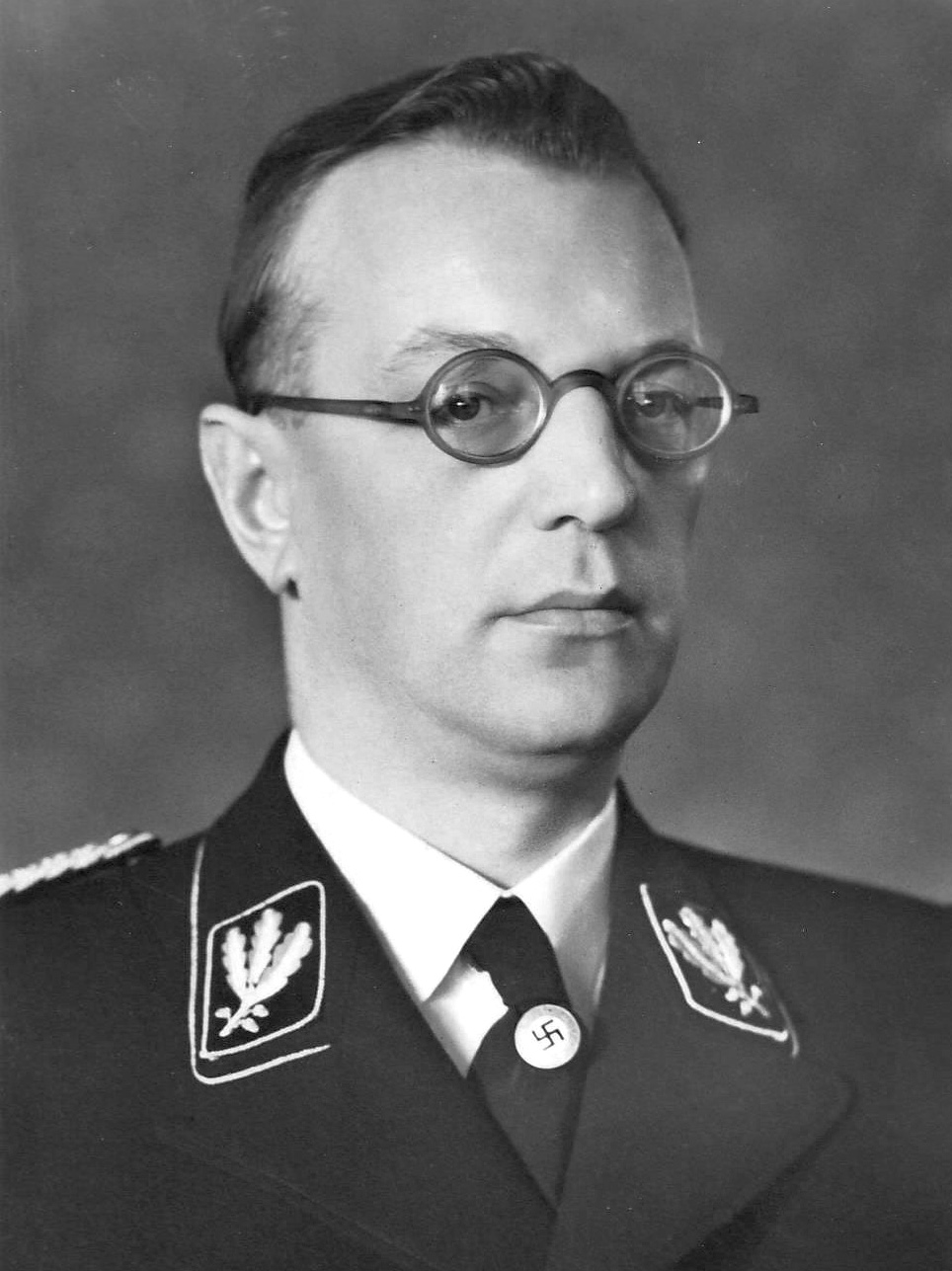
- Seyss-Inquart c. 1940s

Chancellor of Austria
- In office 11–13 March 1938
- President: Wilhelm Miklas
- Vice-Chancellor: Edmund Glaise-Horstenau
- Preceded by: Kurt Schuschnigg
- Succeeded by: Position abolished Karl Renner (from 1945); Himself (As Reichsstatthalter of Austria)

Reichsstatthalter of Austria
- In office 15 March 1938 – 1 May 1939
- Preceded by: Office established
- Succeeded by: Office abolished

Deputy Governor-General of the General Government of Occupied Poland
- In office 26 October 1939 – 18 May 1940
- Governor-General: Hans Frank
- Preceded by: Office established
- Succeeded by: Josef Bühler

Reichskommissar of the Netherlands
- In office 29 May 1940 – 5 May 1945
- Preceded by: Alexander von Falkenhausen (as Military Governor)
- Succeeded by: Office abolished

Additional positions
- 30 April–2 May 1945: Reichsminister of Foreign Affairs
- 1939–1945: Reichsminister without portfolio
- 1938–1945: Member of the Greater German Reichstag
- 11–13 March 1938: Acting Minister of Defence of Austria
- 16 February–13 March 1938: Minister of the Interior of Austria
- 1937–1938: State Councillor of Austria

Personal details
- Born: 22 July 1892 Stannern, Austria-Hungary
- Died: 16 October 1946 (aged 54) Nuremberg, Allied-occupied Germany
- Party: Independent (1933–1938); Nazi Party (1938–1945)
- Spouse: Gertrud Maschka (m. 1916)
- Children: 3
- Cabinet: Seyss-Inquart

Military service
- Allegiance: Austria-Hungary
- Branch/service: Austro-Hungarian Army
- Years of service: 1914–1918
- Battles/wars: World War I
- Criminal information
- Status: Executed by hanging
- Convictions: Crimes of aggression War crimes Crimes against humanity
- Trial: Nuremberg trials
- Penalty: Death

Arthur Seyss-Inquart (German: Seyß-Inquart; Austrian German pronunciation: [ˈartuːɐ̯ saɪs ˈɪŋkvart]; 22 July 1892 – 16 October 1946) was an Austrian Nazi politician and convicted war criminal who served as Chancellor of Austria in 1938 for two days before the Anschluss. His positions in Nazi Germany included deputy governor to Hans Frank in the General Government of Occupied Poland, and Reichskommissar for the German-occupied Netherlands. In the latter role, he shared responsibility for the deportation of Dutch Jews and the shooting of hostages.

During World War I, Seyss-Inquart fought for the Austro-Hungarian Army with distinction. After the war, he became a successful lawyer and went on to join the governments of Chancellors Engelbert Dollfuss and Kurt Schuschnigg. In 1938, Schuschnigg resigned in the face of a German invasion, and Seyss-Inquart was appointed his successor. The newly installed Nazis proceeded to transfer power to Germany, and Austria subsequently became the German province of Ostmark, with Seyss-Inquart as its governor (Reichsstatthalter).

During World War II, Seyss-Inquart served briefly as the Deputy Governor General in occupied Poland and, following the fall of the Low Countries in 1940, he was appointed Reichskommissar of the occupied Netherlands. He was a member of the Schutzstaffel (SS) and held the rank of SS-Obergruppenführer. He instituted a reign of terror, with Dutch civilians subjected to forced labour and the vast majority of Dutch Jews deported and murdered.

At the Nuremberg trials, Seyss-Inquart was found guilty of war crimes and crimes against humanity, sentenced to death, and executed by hanging.

== Early life ==
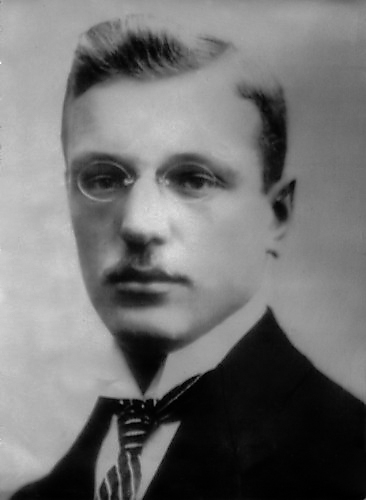
Seyss-Inquart in 1925

Seyss-Inquart was born in 1892 in Stannern (Czech: Stonařov), a German-speaking village in the neighbourhood of the predominantly German-speaking town of Iglau (Czech: Jihlava). This area constituted a German linguistic island in the midst of a Czech-speaking region; this may have contributed to the outspoken national consciousness of the family and the young Arthur in particular. Iglau was an important town in Moravia, one of the Czech provinces of the Austro-Hungarian Empire, in which there was increasing rivalry between Germans and Czechs. His parents were the school principal, Emil Zajtich (who changed his surname to Seyss-Inquart) and Augusta Hirenbach. His father was Czech and his mother was German.

The family moved to Vienna in 1907. Seyss-Inquart later studied law at the University of Vienna. At the beginning of World War I in August 1914 Seyss-Inquart enlisted with the Austrian Army and was given a commission with the Tyrolean Kaiserjäger, subsequently serving in Russia, Romania and Italy. He was decorated for bravery on a number of occasions and he completed his final examinations for his degree while recovering from wounds in 1917. Seyss-Inquart had five older siblings: Hedwig (born 1881), Richard (born 3 April 1883, became a Roman Catholic priest, but left the priesthood, married in a civil ceremony and became Oberregierungsrat [senior government counsel] and prison superior by 1940 in the Ostmark), Irene (born 1885), Henriette (born 1887) and Robert (born 1891).

In 1911, Seyss-Inquart met Gertrud Maschka. The couple married in December 1916 and had three children: Ingeborg Carolina Augusta (born 18 September 1917), Richard (born 22 August 1921) and Dorothea (born 7 May 1928).

== Political career and the Anschluss ==
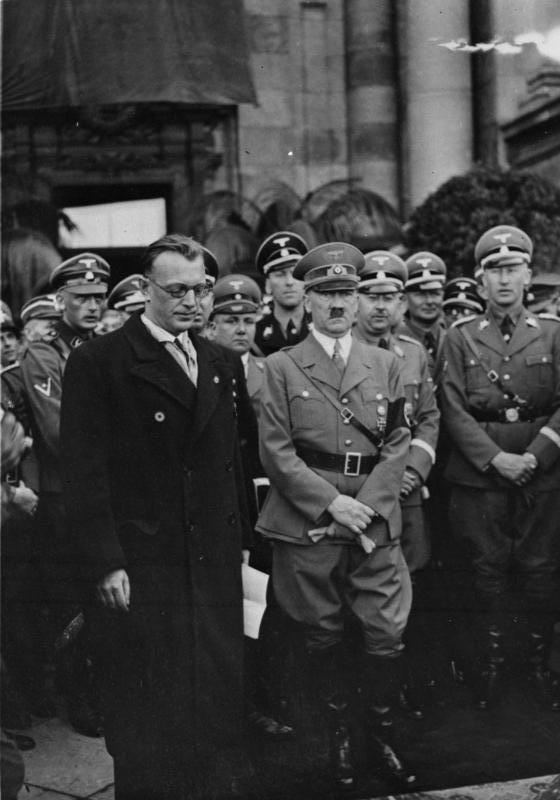
Seyss-Inquart with Hitler, Himmler, Heydrich, Kaltenbrunner and Bormann in Vienna, in 1938

Seyss-Inquart went into law after the war and, in 1921, set up his own practice. During the early years of the Austrian First Republic, he was close to the Fatherland Front. A successful lawyer, Seyss-Inquart was invited to join the cabinet of Chancellor Engelbert Dollfuss in 1933. Following Dollfuss' murder in 1934, he became a State Councillor from 1937 under Kurt Schuschnigg. A keen mountaineer, Seyss-Inquart became the head of the German and Austrian Alpine Club. He later became a devotee of Heinrich Himmler's concepts of racial purity and sponsored various expeditions to Tibet and other parts of Asia in hopes of proving Aryan racial concepts and theories. Seyss-Inquart was not initially a member of the Austrian National Socialist party, though he was sympathetic to many of their views and actions. By 1938, however, Seyss-Inquart knew which way the political wind was blowing and became a respectable frontman for the Austrian National Socialists.

In February 1938, Seyss-Inquart was appointed Austrian Minister of the Interior by Schuschnigg, after Hitler had threatened Schuschnigg with military action against Austria in the event of non-compliance. On 11 March 1938, faced with a German invasion aimed at preventing a plebiscite on independence, Schuschnigg resigned as Austrian Chancellor. Under growing pressure from Berlin, President Wilhelm Miklas reluctantly appointed Seyss-Inquart his successor. On the next day, German troops crossed the border of Austria at the telegraphed invitation of Seyss-Inquart. This telegram had actually been drafted beforehand and was released after the troops had begun to march, so as to justify the action in the eyes of the international community. Before his triumphant entry into Vienna, Hitler had planned to leave Austria as a pro-Nazi puppet state headed by Seyss-Inquart. However, the acclaim for the German army from the majority of the Austrian population led Hitler to change course and opt for a full Anschluss, in which Austria was incorporated into Nazi Germany as the province of Ostmark. Only then, on 13 March 1938, did Seyss-Inquart join the Nazi Party.

== Head of Ostmark and Southern Poland ==
Seyss-Inquart drafted the legislative act reducing Austria to a province of Germany and signed it into law on 13 March. With Hitler's approval, he became Governor (Reichsstatthalter) of the newly named Ostmark, thus becoming Hitler's personal representative in Austria. Ernst Kaltenbrunner served as chief minister and Josef Burckel as Commissioner for the Reunion of Austria (concerned with the "Jewish Question"). On 10 April 1938, Seyss-Inquart was elected as a deputy to the Reichstag from Ostmark and would retain this seat until May 1945. He also received an honorary SS rank of Gruppenführer and in May 1939 he was made a Reichsminister without Portfolio in Hitler's cabinet. Almost as soon as he took office, he ordered the confiscation of Jewish property and sent Jews to concentration camps. Late in his regime, he collaborated in the deportation of Jews from Austria.

Following the invasion of Poland in 1939, Seyss-Inquart was named as the Chief of Civil Administration for Southern Poland, but did not take up that post before the General Government was created, in which he became Deputy to the Governor General Hans Frank, remaining in this position until 18 May 1940. He fully supported the heavy-handed policies put into effect by Frank, including the persecution of Jews. He was also aware of the Abwehr's murder of Polish intellectuals.

== Reichskommissar in the Netherlands ==
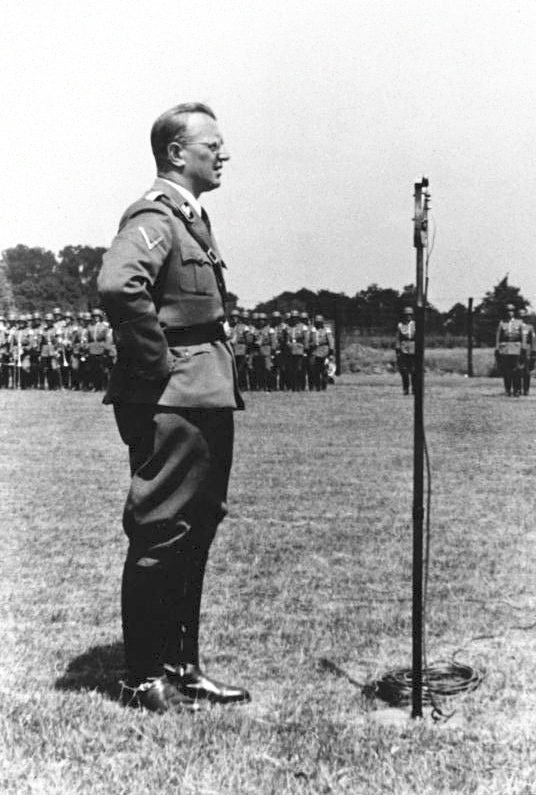
Seyss-Inquart in The Hague (1940)

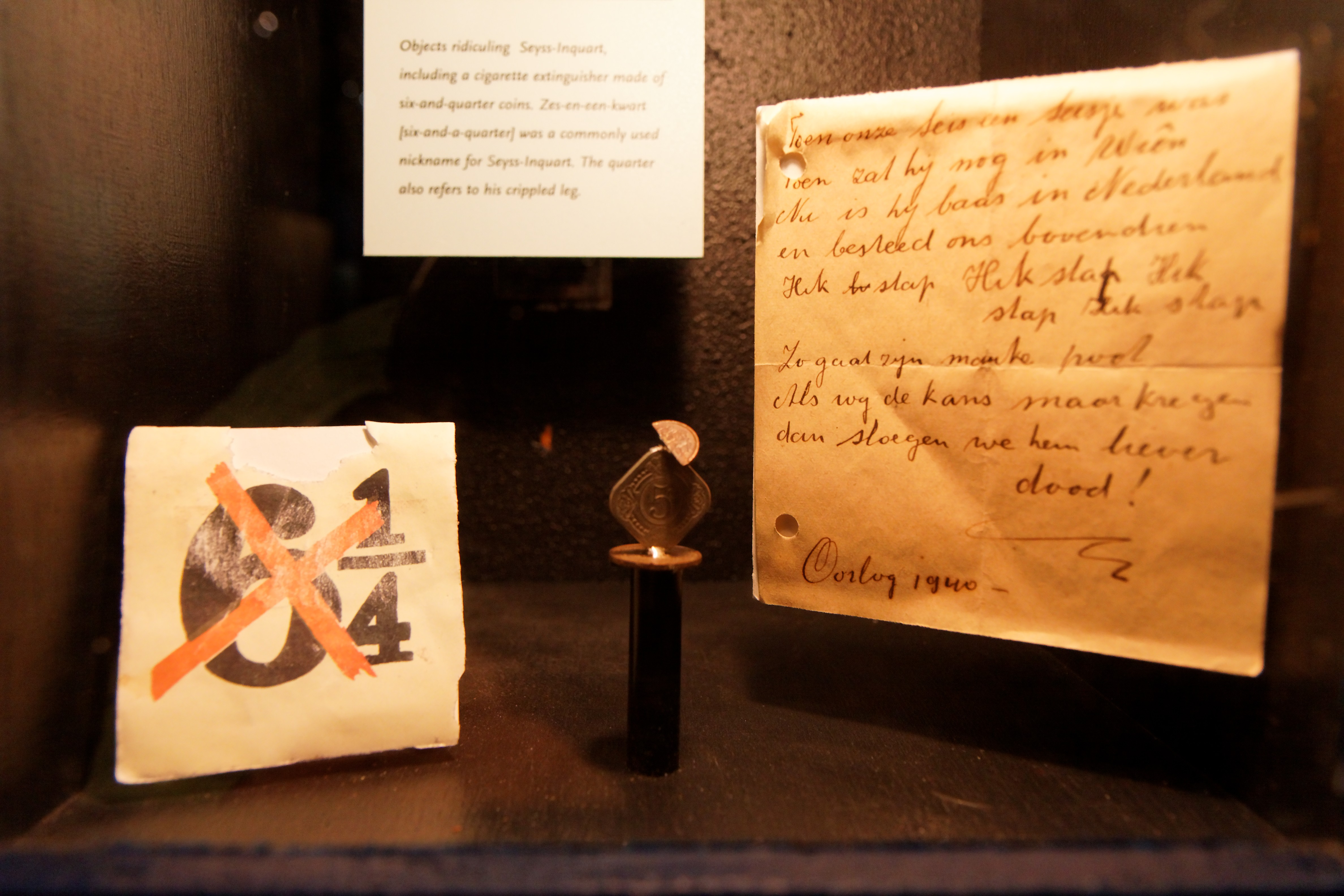
Objects ridiculing Seyss-Inquart, including a cigarette extinguisher made of coins adding up to 6 1/4 cents. Zes-en-een-kwart (six-and-a-quarter) was a commonly used nickname for Seyss-Inquart. The quarter also refers to his crippled leg.

Following the capitulation of the Netherlands on 15 May 1940, Seyss-Inquart was appointed Reichskommissar for the Occupied Netherlands. He directed the civil administration, imposed complete economic subordination to Germany, and carried out Nazi policies. In April 1941, he was promoted to SS-Obergruppenführer. Among the Dutch people he was mockingly referred to as "Zes en een kwart" ("six and a quarter"), a play on his name, and the fact that Seyss-Inquart suffered from a limp. He supported the Dutch National Socialist Movement in the Netherlands (NSB) and allowed them to create the paramilitary Nederlandse Landwacht, which acted as an auxiliary police force. Other political parties were banned in late 1941 and many former government officials were imprisoned at Kamp Sint-Michielsgestel. The administration of the country was controlled by Seyss-Inquart and he answered directly to Hitler. He oversaw the politicisation of cultural groups from the Nederlandsche Kultuurkamer "right down to the chessplayers' club", and set up a number of other politicised associations.

He introduced measures to combat resistance, and when there was a widespread strike in Amsterdam, Arnhem and Hilversum in May 1943, special summary court-martial procedures were brought in, and a collective fine of 18 million guilders was imposed. During the occupation, Seyss-Inquart authorized about 800 executions, although some reports put the total at over 1,500. These included executions under the so-called "Hostage Law", the killing of political prisoners who were close to being liberated, the Putten raid, and the reprisal executions of 117 Dutchmen for the attack on SS and Police Leader Hanns Albin Rauter. Although the majority of Seyss-Inquart's powers were transferred to the military commander in the Netherlands and the Gestapo in July 1944, he remained a force to be reckoned with.

There were three concentration camps in the Netherlands: the smaller KZ Herzogenbusch near Vught, Kamp Amersfoort near Amersfoort, and Westerbork transit camp (a "Jewish assembly camp"); there were a number of other camps variously controlled by the military, the police, the SS, or Seyss-Inquart's administration. These included a "voluntary labour recruitment" camp at Ommen (Camp Erika). In total, around 530,000 Dutch civilians were forced to work for the Germans, of whom 250,000 were sent to factories in Germany. There was an unsuccessful attempt by Seyss-Inquart to send only workers aged 21 to 23 to Germany, and he refused demands in 1944 for a further 250,000 Dutch workers and in that year sent only 12,000 people.

Seyss-Inquart was an unwavering anti-Semite; within a few months of his arrival in the Netherlands, he took measures to remove Jews from the government, the press and leading positions in industry. Anti-Jewish measures intensified after 1941: approximately 140,000 Jews were registered, a "ghetto" was created in Amsterdam and a transit camp was set up at Westerbork. In February 1941, 600 Jews were sent to Buchenwald, a concentration camp located within Germany's borders, and to Mauthausen, located in Upper Austria. Later, the Dutch Jews were sent to Auschwitz, the notorious complex operated by Nazi Germany in occupied Poland. As Allied forces approached in September 1944, the remaining Jews at Westerbork were removed to Theresienstadt, the SS-established concentration camp/ghetto in the Nazi German-occupied region of Czechoslovakia. Of the 140,000 registered, only 30,000 Dutch Jews survived the war.

When the Allies advanced into the Netherlands in late 1944, the Nazi regime had attempted to enact a scorched earth policy, and some docks and harbours were destroyed. Seyss-Inquart, however, was in agreement with Armaments Minister Albert Speer over the futility of such actions, and with the open connivance of many military commanders, they greatly limited the implementation of the scorched-earth orders.

At the very end of the Dutch "hunger winter" in April 1945, Seyss-Inquart was with difficulty persuaded by the Allies to allow airplanes to drop food for the starving Dutch civilians of the occupied north-west of the country. Although he knew the war was lost, Seyss-Inquart did not want to surrender.

Before Hitler committed suicide in April 1945, he named a new government headed by Grand Admiral Karl Dönitz in his last will and testament, in which Seyss-Inquart replaced Joachim von Ribbentrop, who had long since fallen out of favour, as Foreign Minister. It was a token of the high regard Hitler felt for his Austrian comrade, at a time when he was rapidly disowning or being abandoned by so many of his other key lieutenants. Unsurprisingly, at such a late stage in the war, Seyss-Inquart failed to achieve anything in his new office.

He remained in his posts until 5 May 1945, when, after a meeting with Dönitz to confirm his rescission of the scorched earth orders, he was arrested on the Elbe Bridge in Hamburg by two soldiers of the Royal Welch Fusiliers, one of whom was Norman Miller (birth name: Norbert Mueller), a German Jew from Nuremberg who had escaped to Britain at the age of 15 on a Kindertransport. The Anglo-Dutch art dealer Edward Speelman was also involved in Seyss-Inquart's arrest.

== Nuremberg trials ==
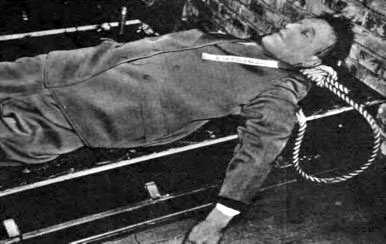
Seyss-Inquart's body after execution

At the Nuremberg trials, Seyss-Inquart was defended by Gustav Steinbauer and faced four charges: conspiracy to commit crimes against peace; planning, initiating and waging wars of aggression; war crimes; and crimes against humanity. During the trial, Gustave Gilbert, an American army psychologist, was allowed to examine the Nazi leaders who were tried at Nuremberg for war crimes. Among other tests, a German version of the Wechsler-Bellevue IQ test was administered. Arthur Seyss-Inquart scored 141, the second highest among the defendants, behind Hjalmar Schacht.

In his final statement, Seyss-Inquart denied knowledge of various war crimes, including the shooting of hostages, and said that while he had moral objections to the deportation of Jews, there must sometimes be justifications for mass evacuations, and pointed to the Allies forcibly resettling millions of Germans after the war. He added that his "conscience was untroubled" as he improved the conditions of the Dutch people while Reichskommissar of the Netherlands.

Seyss-Inquart was acquitted of conspiracy but convicted on all other counts and sentenced to death by hanging. The final judgment against him cited his involvement in the harsh suppression of Nazi opponents and atrocities against the Jews during all his billets, but particularly stressed his reign of terror in the Netherlands. It was these atrocities that sent him to the gallows.

Upon hearing of his death sentence, Seyss-Inquart was fatalistic: "Death by hanging [...] well, in view of the whole situation, I never expected anything different. It's all right."

Before his execution, Seyss-Inquart returned to the Catholic Church, receiving absolution in the sacrament of confession from prison chaplain Father Bruno Spitzl.

Seyss-Inquart was hanged in Nuremberg Prison on 16 October 1946, at the age of 54, together with nine other Nuremberg defendants. He was the last to mount the scaffold, and his last words were the following: "I hope that this execution is the last act of the tragedy of the Second World War and that the lesson taken from this world war will be that peace and understanding should exist between peoples. I believe in Germany."

His body, with those of the other nine executed men and that of Hermann Göring (who had committed suicide the previous day), was cremated at the Ostfriedhof in Munich, and their ashes were scattered into the River Isar.

== Cultural references ==
In Doris Orgel's children's novel, The Devil in Vienna, the narrator refers to Seyss-Inquart’s rise as she observes the changing political atmosphere in her Vienna. In Otto Preminger's movie The Cardinal, Seyss-Inquart is played by Erik Frey.

== See also ==
- List of SS-Obergruppenführer
- Nazi plunder
- The Holocaust in the Netherlands
- Kajetan Mühlmann

Political offices
Preceded by Edmund Glaise-Horstenau	Minister of the Interior of Austria; 16 February 1938–13 March 1938	Succeeded by Franz Honner (1945)
Preceded by Kurt Schuschnigg	Minister of Defense of Austria; 11 March 1938–13 March 1938	Succeeded by Ferdinand Graf (1945)
Preceded by Kurt Schuschnigg	Chancellor of Austria; 11 March 1938–13 March 1938	Vacant Annexation by Nazi Germany Title next held by Karl Renner
Preceded by None	Reichsstatthalter of Austria; 15 March 1938–1 May 1939	Succeeded by Josef Bürckel
Preceded by None	Deputy Governor-General of the General Government of Occupied Poland; 12 October 1939–18 May 1940	Succeeded by Josef Bühler
Preceded by Alexander von Falkenhausen (as Military Governor)	Reichskommissar of the Netherlands; 29 May 1940–7 May 1945	Succeeded by Office abolished
Preceded by Joachim von Ribbentrop	Reichsminister of Foreign Affairs; 30 April 1945–2 May 1945	Succeeded by Lutz Schwerin von Krosigk
