= Dlouhá Brtnice =

- Municipality
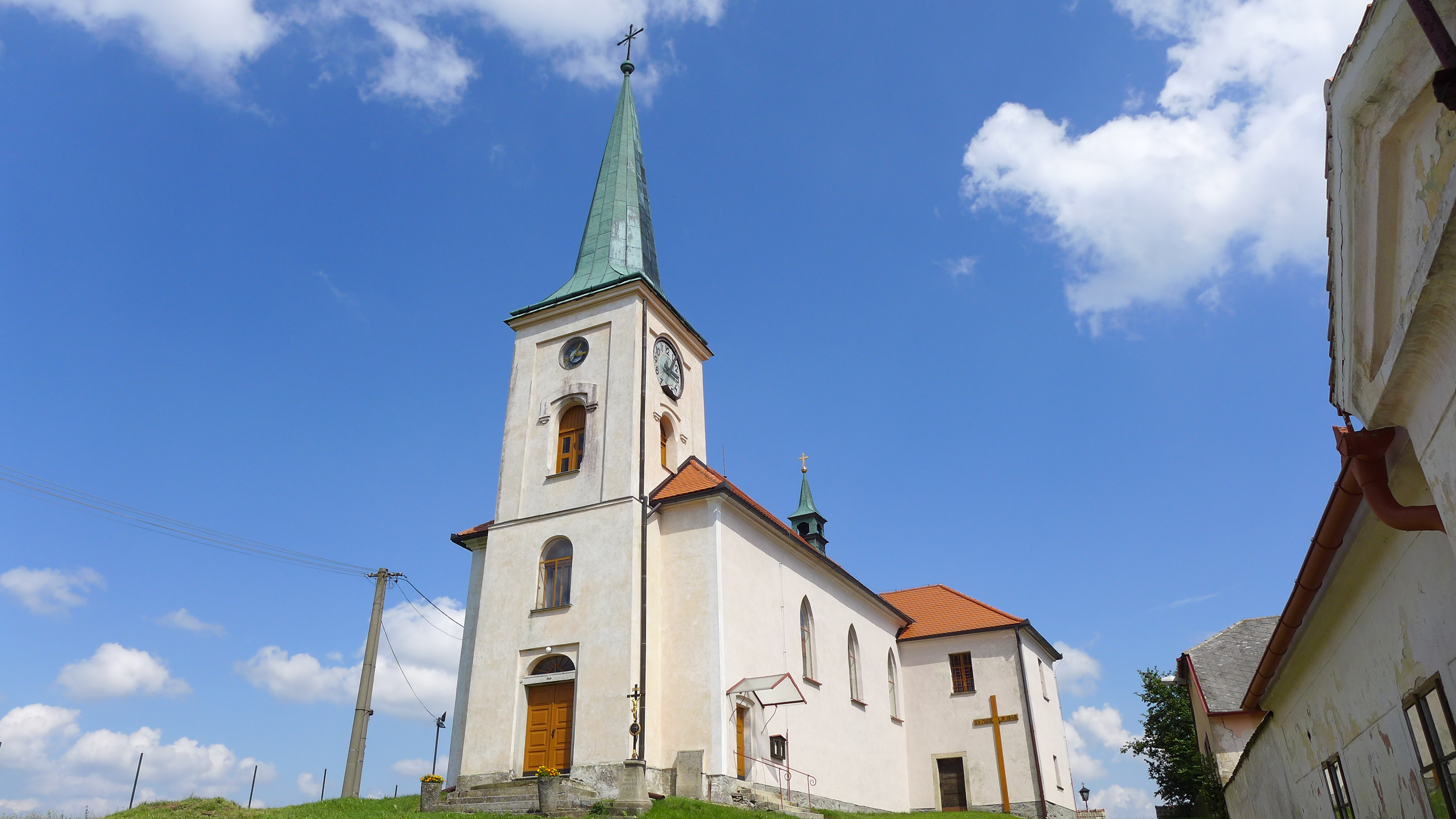
- Church of Saint Wenceslaus

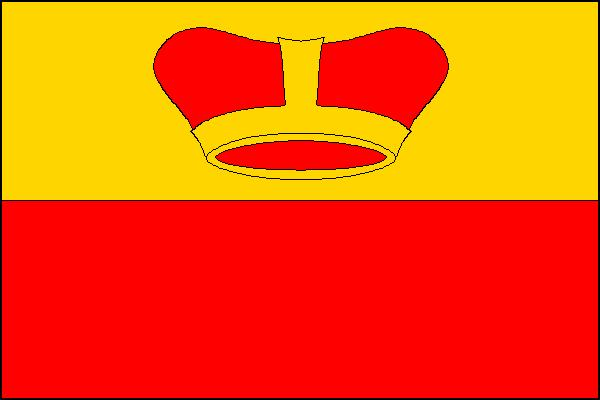
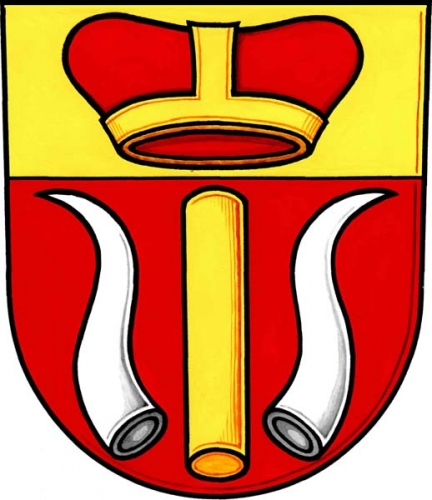
- Flag Coat of arms

- Location in the Czech Republic
- Coordinates: 49°14′10″N 15°36′15″E
- Country: Czech Republic
- Region: Vysočina
- District: Jihlava
- First mentioned: 1349

Area
  - Total: 11.43 km^{2} (4.41 sq mi)
- Elevation: 610 m (2,000 ft)

Population (2026-01-01)
  - Total: 380
  - Density: 33/km^{2} (86/sq mi)
- Time zone: UTC+1 (CET)
  - Summer (DST): UTC+2 (CEST)
- Postal code: 588 34
- Website: www.dlouhabrtnice.cz

Dlouhá Brtnice (Czech pronunciation: [ˈdlouhaː ˈbr̩cɲɪtsɛ]; German: Langpirnitz) is a municipality and village in Jihlava District in the Vysočina Region of the Czech Republic. It has about 400 inhabitants.

Dlouhá Brtnice lies approximately 18 kilometres (11 mi) south of Jihlava and 127 km (79 mi) south-east of Prague.

== Demographics ==
Historical population
Year	Pop.	±%
1869	651	—
1880	688	+5.7%
1890	654	−4.9%
1900	624	−4.6%
1910	624	+0.0%
1921	602	−3.5%
1930	538	−10.6%
1950	476	−11.5%
1961	479	+0.6%
1970	409	−14.6%
1980	379	−7.3%
1991	369	−2.6%
2001	356	−3.5%
2011	388	+9.0%
2021	372	−4.1%
Source: Censuses
