= Kurt Schuschnigg =

Chancellor of Austria from 1934 to 1938

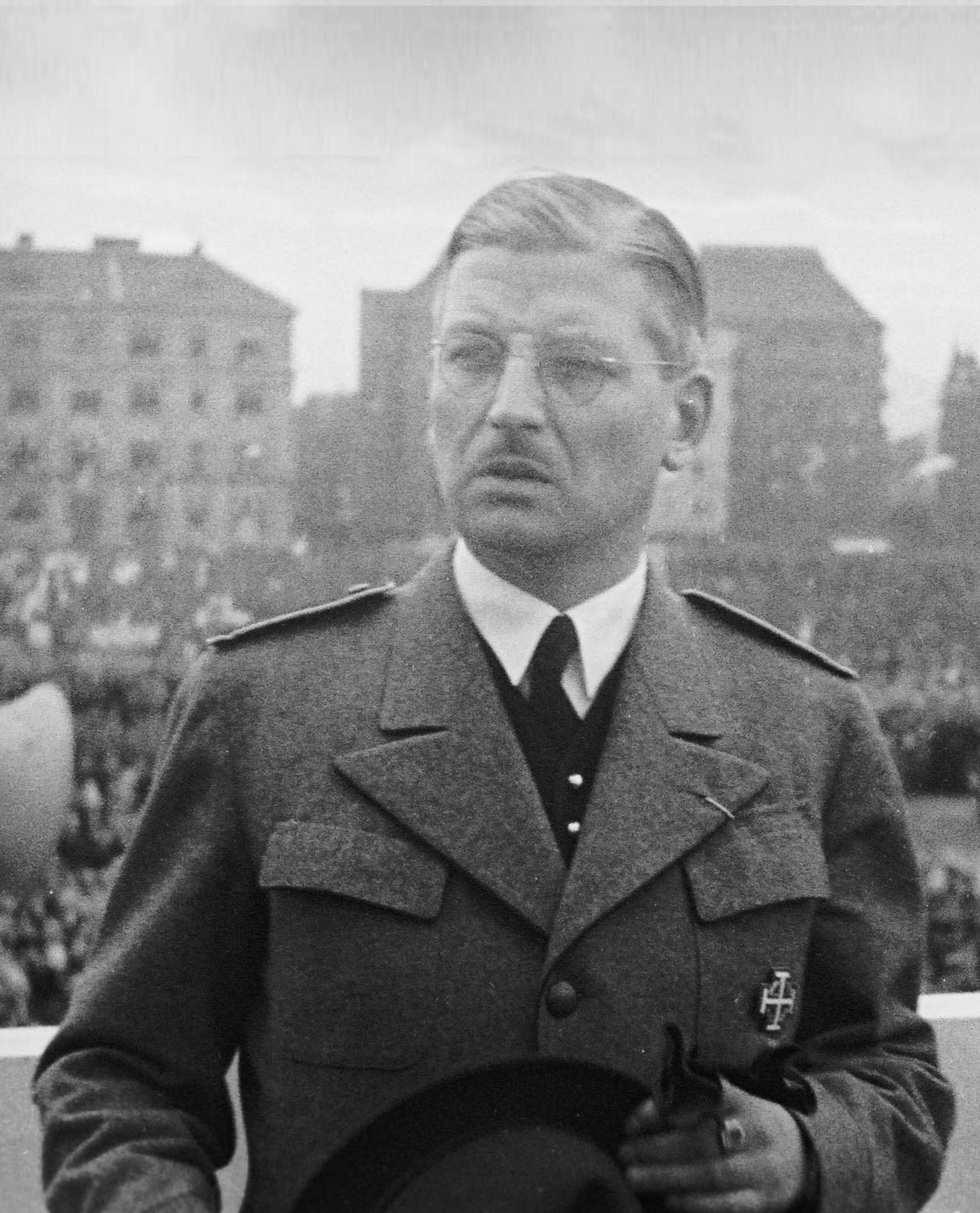
- Schuschnigg in 1936

Chancellor of Austria
- In office 29 July 1934 – 11 March 1938
- President: Wilhelm Miklas
- Vice-Chancellor: Ernst Rüdiger Starhemberg; Eduard Baar-Baarenfels; Ludwig Hülgerth; Edmund Glaise-Horstenau
- Preceded by: Engelbert Dollfuss
- Succeeded by: Arthur Seyss-Inquart

Minister of Defence
- In office 29 July 1934 – 11 March 1938
- Preceded by: Ernst Rüdiger Starhemberg
- Succeeded by: Arthur Seyss-Inquart

Minister of Education
- In office 24 May 1933 – 14 May 1936
- Preceded by: Anton Rintelen
- Succeeded by: Hans Pernter

Minister of Justice
- In office 29 January 1932 – 10 July 1934
- Preceded by: Hans Schürff
- Succeeded by: Egon Berger-Waldenegg

Personal details
- Born: Kurt Alois Josef Johann Edler von Schuschnigg; 14 December 1897 Reiff am Gartsee, County of Tyrol
- Died: 18 November 1977 (aged 79) Mutters, Tyrol, Austria
- Party: Fatherland Front (1933–1938)
- Other political affiliations: Christian Social Party (1927–1933)
- Spouses: Herma Masera (m. 1926; died 1935) Vera Fugger von Babenhausen (m. 1938; died 1959)
- Children: 2
- Education: University of Freiburg; Innsbruck University

Military service
- Allegiance: Austro-Hungarian Empire
- Branch/service: Austro-Hungarian Army
- Years of service: 1915–1919
- Battles/wars: World War I; Italian Front (POW); Battles of the Isonzo
- Kurt Schuschunigg's voice Order of Schuschnigg to the Austrian army during the German invasion Recorded 11 March 1938

Kurt Alois Josef Johann von Schuschnigg (Note: Between his family's ennoblement in 1898 and the 1919 abolition of the Austrian nobility, he bore the title Edler von Schuschnigg.) (German: [ˈkʊʁt ˈʃʊʃnɪk]; 14 December 1897 – 18 November 1977) was an Austrian politician who was the Chancellor of the Federal State of Austria from the 1934 assassination of his predecessor Engelbert Dollfuss until the 1938 Anschluss with Nazi Germany. Although Schuschnigg considered Austria a German state and Austrians to be Germans, he was strongly opposed to Adolf Hitler's goal to absorb Austria into the Third Reich and wished for it to remain independent.

When Schuschnigg's efforts to keep Austria independent had failed, he resigned his office. After the Anschluss he was arrested, kept in solitary confinement, and eventually interned in various concentration camps. He was liberated in 1945 by the advancing US Army and spent most of the rest of his life in academia in the United States. Schuschnigg gained American citizenship in 1956.

== Early life ==
Schuschnigg was born in Reiff am Gartsee (now Riva del Garda) in the Tyrolean crown land of Austria-Hungary (now in Trentino, Italy), the son of Anna Josefa Amalia (née Wopfner) and Austrian General Artur von Schuschnigg, member of a long-established Austrian officers' family of Carinthian Slovene descent. The Slovene spelling of the family name is Šušnik.

He received his education at the Stella Matutina Jesuit College in Feldkirch, Vorarlberg. During World War I, he was taken prisoner at the Italian Front and held captive until September 1919. Subsequently, he studied law at the University of Freiburg and the University of Innsbruck, where he became a member of the Catholic fraternity A.V. Austria. After graduating in 1922, he practiced as a lawyer in Innsbruck.

== Political career ==
Schuschnigg first joined the right-wing Christian Social Party and in 1927 was elected to the Nationalrat, then the youngest parliamentary deputy. Suspicious of the paramilitary Heimwehr organisation, he established the Catholic Ostmärkische Sturmscharen forces in 1930.

On 29 January 1932, the Christian Social chancellor Karl Buresch appointed Schuschnigg Minister of Justice, an office he retained in the cabinet of Buresch's successor Engelbert Dollfuss, and he also served as Minister of Education from 24 May 1933. As justice minister, he openly discussed the abolition of the parliamentary system and restored the death penalty. In March 1933, he and Chancellor Dollfuss took the occasion to dissolve the National Council parliament. After the socialist February Uprising of 1934, he had eight insurgents immediately executed, earning him the reputation of an "assassin of the workers". The executions have since been referred to as a vengeful act of judicial murder. Schuschnigg himself later called his orders a "faux pas".

On 1 May 1934, Dollfuss had erected the authoritarian Federal State of Austria. After Dollfuss was assassinated by the Nazi Otto Planetta during the July Putsch, Schuschnigg on 29 July was appointed Austrian chancellor. Like Dollfuss, Schuschnigg ruled mostly by decree. Although his rule was milder than that of Dollfuss, his policies were not much different from the policies of his predecessor. He had to manage the economy of a near-bankrupt state and to maintain law and order in a country which was forbidden, by the terms of the 1919 Treaty of Saint-Germain, to maintain an army in excess of 30,000 men. At the same time, he had to also cope with armed paramilitary forces in Austria, which owed their allegiance not to the state but to various rival political parties. He also had to be mindful of the growing strength of the Austrian Nazis, who supported Adolf Hitler's ambitions to absorb Austria into Nazi Germany. His overriding political concern was to preserve Austria's independence within the borders imposed on it by the terms of the Treaty of Saint-Germain, which ultimately failed.

John Gunther wrote in 1936 of Schuschnigg: "It would not be too much to say that he is as much a prisoner of the Italians now [as he was during World War I] – if the Germans don't get him next week." His policy of counterbalancing the German threat by aligning himself with Austria's southern and eastern neighbours – the Kingdom of Italy under the fascist rule of Benito Mussolini and the Kingdom of Hungary – was doomed to failure after Mussolini had sought Hitler's support in the Second Italo-Ethiopian War and left Austria under the increasing pressure of a massively rearmed Third Reich. Schuschnigg adopted a policy of appeasement towards Hitler and called Austria the "better German state", but struggled to keep Austria independent. In July 1936, he signed an Austro-German Agreement, which, among other concessions, allowed the release of imprisoned July Putsch insurgents and the inclusion of the Nazi contact men Edmund Glaise-Horstenau and Guido Schmidt in the Austrian cabinet. The Nazi Party remained banned; however, the Austrian Nazis gained ground and relations between the two countries deteriorated further. In reaction to Hitler's threats to exercise a controlling influence over Austrian politics, Schuschnigg publicly declared in January 1938:

There is no question of ever accepting Nazi representatives in the Austrian cabinet. An absolute abyss separates Austria from Nazism ... We reject uniformity and centralization. ... Catholicism is anchored in our very soil, and we know but one God: and that is not the State, or the Nation, or that elusive thing, Race.

Rumours concerning his involvement in the Von Trapp family's rise to fame have also come to light. It is rumoured that upon hearing the Von Trapp family sing over the radio, he invited them to perform in Vienna which greatly helped them in their rise to fame.

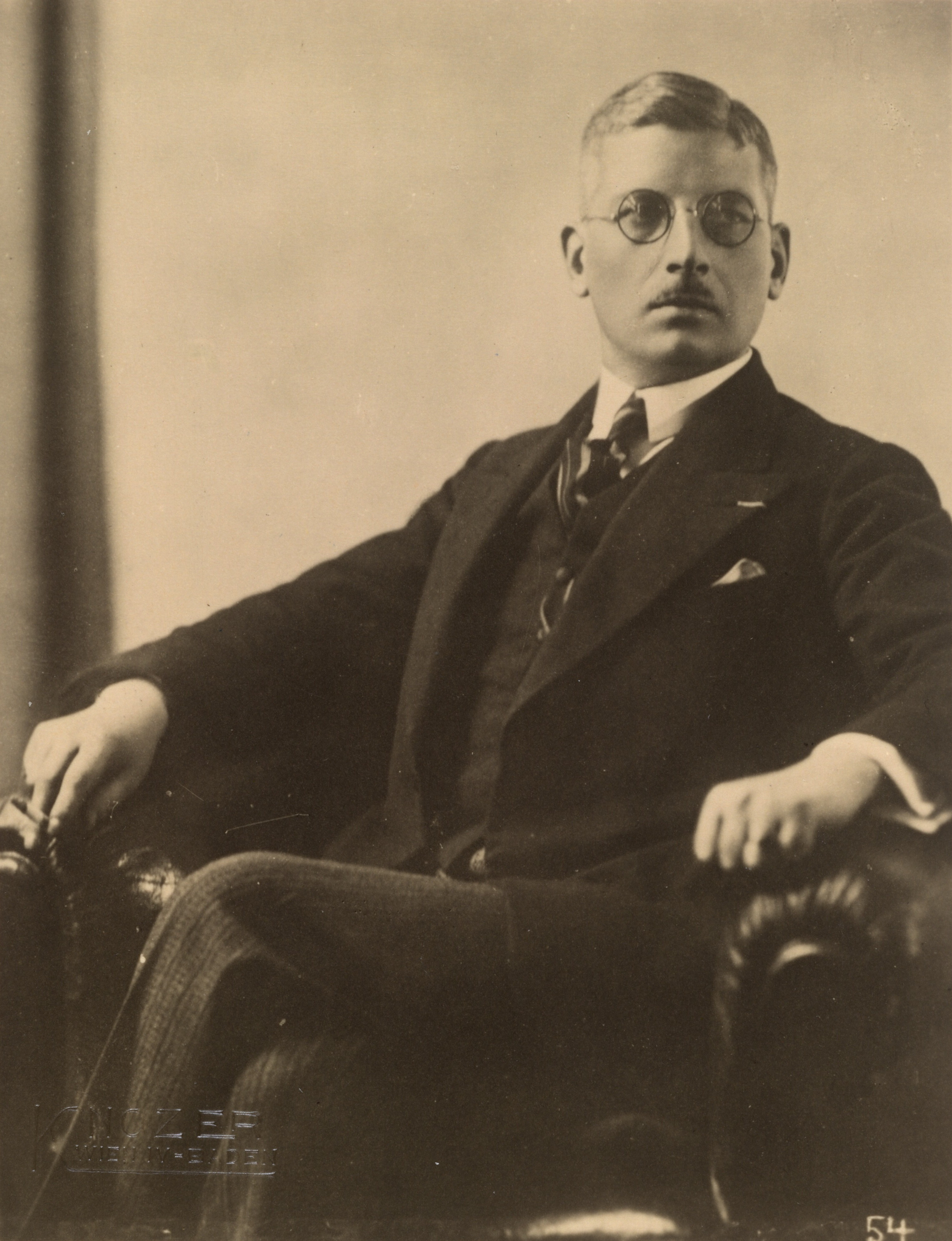
Schuschnigg, 1923

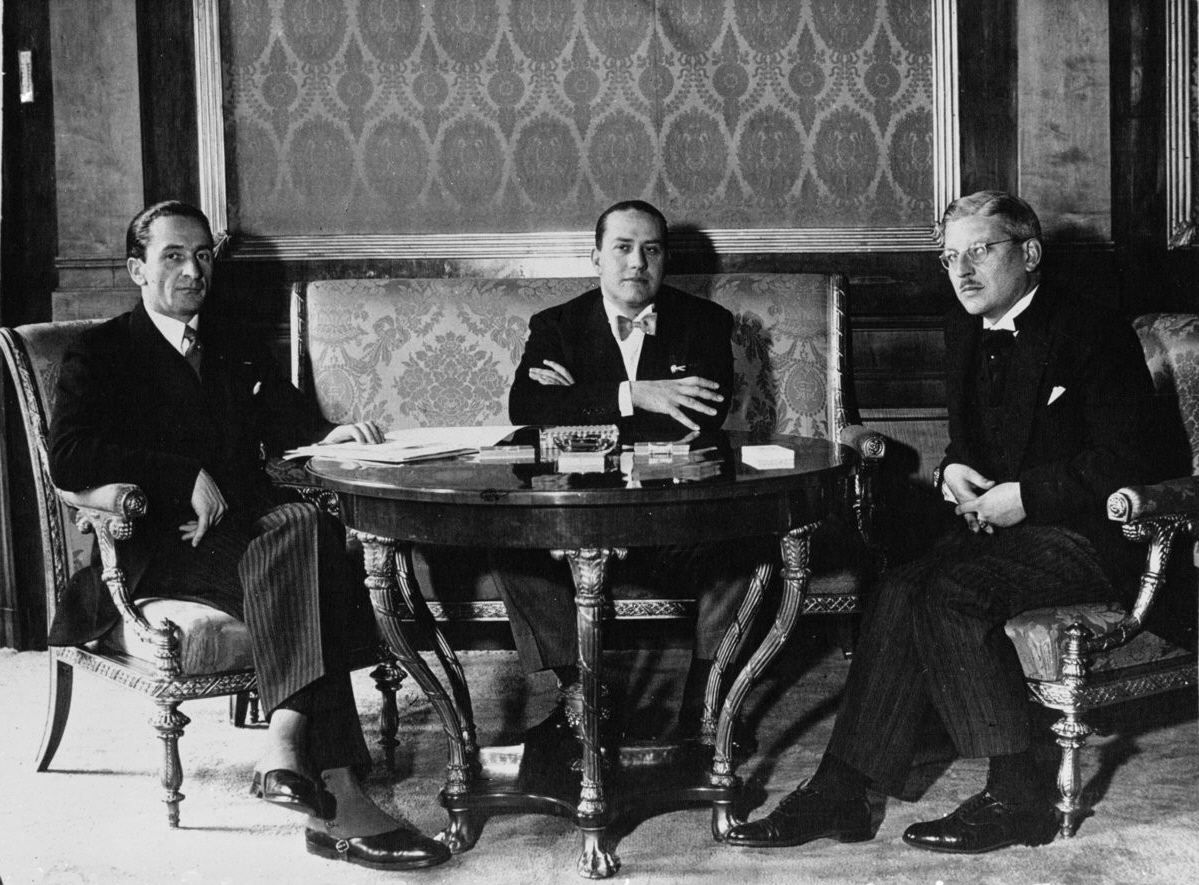
Chancellor Schuschnigg (right) with his state secretary Guido Schmidt and the Italian foreign minister Galeazzo Ciano, 1936

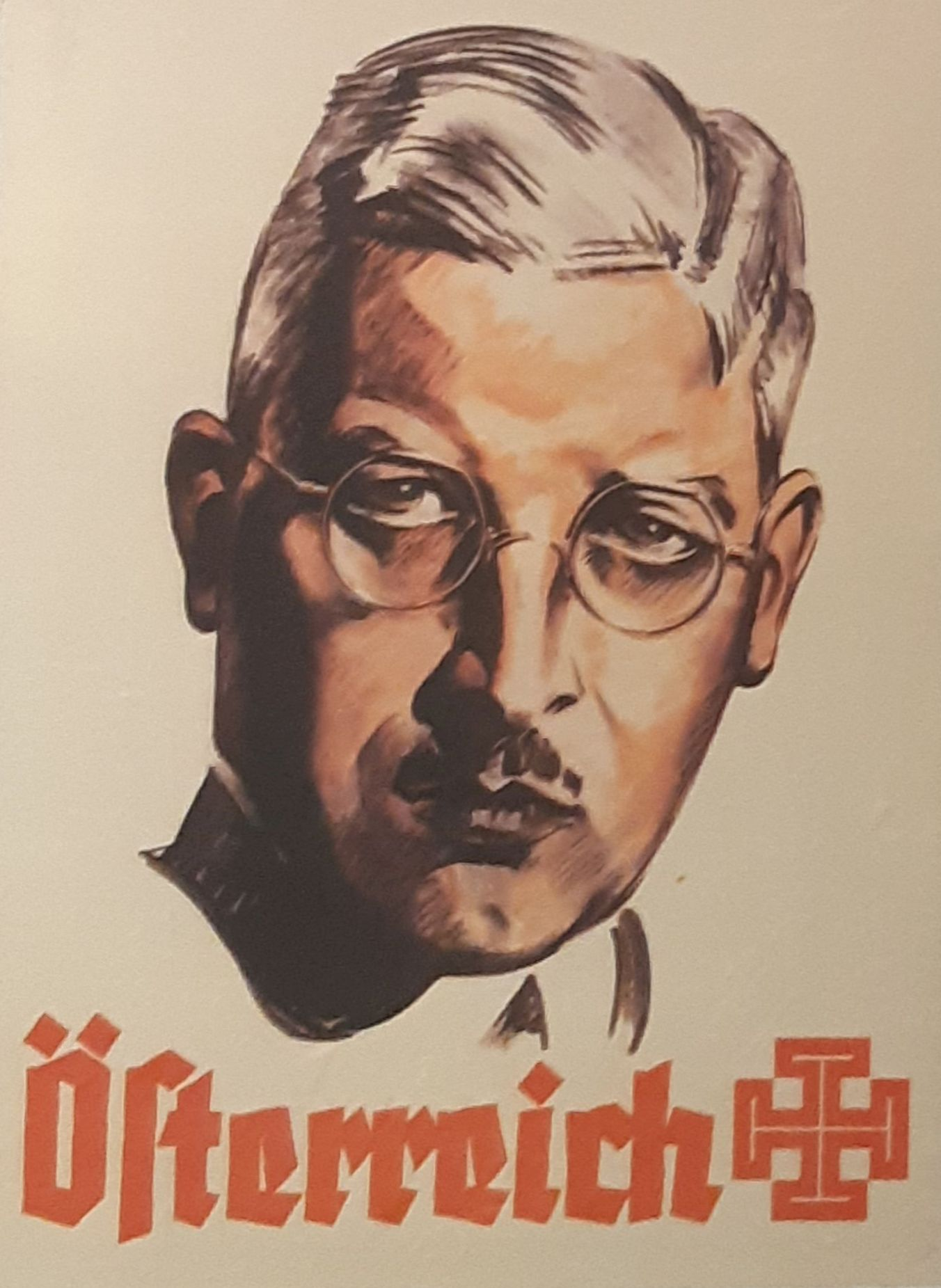
Anti-Anschluss posters often depicted Schuschnigg's face, accompanied by "Österreich".

=== Anschluss ===
On 12 February 1938, Schuschnigg met with Hitler in his Berghof residence in an attempt to smooth the worsening relations between their two countries. To Schuschnigg's surprise, Hitler presented him with a set of demands which, in manner and in terms, amounted to an ultimatum, effectively demanding the handing over of power to the Austrian Nazis. The terms of the agreement, presented to Schuschnigg for immediate endorsement, stipulated the appointment of Nazi sympathiser Arthur Seyss-Inquart as minister of security, which controlled the police. Another pro-Nazi, Hans Fischböck, was to be named as minister of finance to prepare for economic union between Germany and Austria. A hundred officers were to be exchanged between the Austrian and the German armies. All imprisoned Nazis were to be amnestied and reinstated. In return, Hitler would publicly reaffirm the treaty of 11 July 1936 and Austria's national sovereignty. "The Führer was abusive and threatening, and Schuschnigg was presented with far-reaching demands ..." According to Schuschnigg's memoirs, he was coerced into signing the "agreement" before leaving Berchtesgaden.

The president, Wilhelm Miklas, was reluctant to endorse the agreement but eventually did so. Then he, Schuschnigg and a few key Cabinet members considered a number of options:

1. The Chancellor resign and the President call on a new Chancellor to form a Cabinet, which would be under no obligation to the commitments of Berchtesgaden.
2. The Berchtesgaden agreement be carried out under a newly appointed Chancellor.
3. The agreement be carried out and the Chancellor remain at his post.

In the event, they decided to go with the third option.

On the following day, 14 February, Schuschnigg reorganised his cabinet on a broader basis and included representatives of all former and present political parties. Hitler immediately appointed a new Gauleiter for Austria, a Nazi Austrian army officer who had just been released from prison in accordance with the terms of the general amnesty stipulated by the Berchtesgaden agreement.

On 20 February, Hitler made a speech before the Reichstag which was broadcast live and which for the first time was relayed also by the Austrian radio network. A key phrase in the speech was: "The German Reich is no longer willing to tolerate the suppression of ten million Germans across its borders."

In Austria, the speech was met with concern and by demonstrations by both pro and anti-Nazi elements. On the evening of 24 February, the Austrian Federal Diet (the Austrian Bundestag), was called into session. In his speech to the Diet, Schuschnigg referred to the July 1936 agreement with Germany and stated: "Austria will go thus far and no further." He ended his speech with an emotional appeal to Austrian patriotism: "Red-White-Red (the colours of the Austrian flag) until we're dead!" The speech was received with disapproval from the Austrian Nazis and they began mobilising their supporters. The headline in The Times of London was "Schuschnigg's Speech – Nazis Disturbed". The phrase "thus far and no further" was found "disturbing" by the German press.

To resolve the political uncertainty in the country and to convince Hitler and the rest of the world that the people of Austria wished to remain Austrian and independent of the Third Reich, Schuschnigg, with the full agreement of the President and other political leaders, decided to proclaim a plebiscite to be held on 13 March. But the wording of the referendum which had to be responded to with a "Yes" or a "No" turned out to be controversial. It read: "Are you for a free, German, independent and social, Christian and united Austria, for peace and work, for the equality of all those who affirm themselves for the people and Fatherland?"

There was another issue which drew the ire of the National Socialists. Although members of Schuschnigg's party (the Fatherland Front) could vote at any age, all other Austrians below the age of 24 were to be excluded under a clause to that effect in the Austrian Constitution. This would shut out from the polls most of the Nazi sympathisers in Austria, since the movement was strongest among the young.

Knowing he was in a bind, Schuschnigg held talks with the leaders of the Social Democrats, and agreed to legalise their party and their trade unions in return for their support of the referendum.

The German reaction to the announcement was swift. Hitler first insisted the plebiscite be cancelled. When Schuschnigg reluctantly agreed to scrap it, Hitler demanded his resignation, and insisted that Seyss-Inquart be appointed his successor. This demand President Miklas was reluctant to endorse but eventually, under the threat of immediate armed intervention, it was endorsed as well. Schuschnigg resigned on 11 March, and Seyss-Inquart was appointed Chancellor, but it made no difference; German troops flooded into Austria and were received everywhere by enthusiastic and jubilant crowds. On the morning after the invasion, the London Daily Mail's correspondent asked the new chancellor, Seyss-Inquart, how these stirring events came about, he received the following reply: "The Plebiscite that had been fixed for tomorrow was a breach of the agreement which Dr. Schuschnigg made with Hitler at Berchtesgaden, by which he promised political liberty for National Socialists in Austria." On 12 March 1938, Schuschnigg was placed under house arrest. (Note: See Schuschnigg (1947) for a transcript of telephone conversations on 11 March 1938 between Göring and Seyss-Inquart and other Nazis in Vienna concerning various procedural aspects of the Anschluss, found by the Allies in the ruins of the Reichkanzlei in Berlin.)

== Prison and concentration camp ==
After initial house arrest followed by solitary confinement at Gestapo headquarters, he spent the whole of World War II in Sachsenhausen, then Dachau. In late April 1945, Schuschnigg narrowly escaped an execution order by Adolf Hitler, along with other prominent concentration camp inmates, by being transferred from Dachau to South Tyrol where SS-Totenkopfverbände guards abandoned the prisoners into the hands of some Wehrmacht officers, who then freed them. They were then turned over to American troops on 4 May 1945. From there, Schuschnigg and his family were transported, along with many of the ex-prisoners, to the isle of Capri in Italy before being set free.

== Later life and death ==
After World War II, Kurt Schuschnigg was forbidden from joining the Austrian People's Party (ÖVP) because the party wanted to distance itself from the Austrian dictatorship. Moreover, the ÖVP did not expect their social democratic coalition partner to tolerate Schuschnigg's presence in the party, since after the civil war of 1934 he had had many social democrats killed as Minister of Justice. Schuschnigg emigrated to the United States, where he was sheltered at the chateau estate Vouziers of the Desloge family in St. Louis, Missouri; and then he became a professor of political science at Saint Louis University from 1948 to 1967. He became an American citizen in 1956.

His first wife Herma died in a car accident in 1935. He remarried in 1938, but lost his second wife, Vera Fugger von Babenhausen (née Countess Czernin), in 1959.

Kurt Schuschnigg went back to Austria where he downplayed his time exercising dictatorial powers as chancellor and tried to justify the regime.

Schuschnigg died at Mutters, near Innsbruck, in 1977.

== Awards and decorations ==
- Austria-Hungary: Military Merit Cross
- Austria-Hungary: Military Merit Medal
- Austria-Hungary: Karl Troop Cross
- Austria-Hungary: Decoration of Honour for Services to the Republic of Austria, Pre-war version (2 awards)
- Holy See: Order of St. Gregory the Great, Knight Grand Cross
- Kingdom of Italy: Order of Saints Maurice and Lazarus, Knight Grand Cordon
- Czechoslovakia: Order of the White Lion, Knight Grand Cross
- other medals

== Works ==
- My Austria (1937)
- Austrian Requiem (1946)
- International Law (1959)
- The Brutal Takeover (1969)

In German

- Dreimal Österreich. Verlag Thomas Hegner, Wien 1937.
- Ein Requiem in Rot-Weiß-Rot. Aufzeichnungen des Häftlings Dr. Auster. Amstutz, Zürich 1946.
- Österreich. Eine historische Schau. Verlag Thomas Morus, Sarnen 1946.
- Im Kampf gegen Hitler. Die Überwindung der Anschlußidee. Amalthea, Wien 1988, ISBN 3-85002-256-0.
- Dieter A. Binder (Hrsg.): Sofort vernichten. Die vertraulichen Briefe Kurt und Vera von Schuschnigg 1938–1945. Amalthea, Wien 1997, ISBN 3-85002-393-1.

== Sources ==
- Agostini (26 October 2017) [5 August 1934]. "Portrait of Kurt Schuschnigg (1897-1977), Chancellor of Austria from 1934 to 1938". Agefotostock. Veneranda Biblioteca Ambrosiana, Milan. Archived from the original on 3 February 2024.
- Andrews, William X. (27 March 2017). "'the Sound of Music' and the Demagogue's Allure". The Tennessean.
- Brandstaetter Images (25 October 2009). "Celebration Ceremony at the Castle Schönbrunn on the Occasion of the 'Dreierkonferenz'. Countess Edda Ciano Talks to the Chancellor of the Confederation Dr. V. Schuschnigg and State Secretary Dr. Schmidt. Austria, Vienna". Getty Images.
- Bray, Jack (2020). Alone Against Hitler: Kurt von Schuschnigg's Fight to Save Austria from the Nazis. Buffalo, NY: Prometheus Books. ISBN 978-1633886124.
- "Kurt Schuschnigg". Austria-Forum (in German).
- Nicholson, Michael (30 April 2016). "Chancellor Dr. Schuschnigg with Family". Getty Images.
- Gunther, John (1936). Inside Europe. New York: Harper & Brothers. LCCN 36021033. OCLC 3612891. OL 24958540M.
- Hibbert, Christopher (1962). Benito Mussolini. London: The Reprint Society. OL 58591942M.
- Hopmans, Rob (n.d.). "Schuschnigg, Kurt Alois Josef Johann". World War II Graves.
- Gamma-Keystone (11 September 2017). "Journée des anciens combattants autrichiens". Getty Images (in French).
- "Guide to the Archival Collections at the Missouri History Museum" (PDF). Missouri Historical Society. Fully executed bequest documents in the possession of the Missouri Historical Society Archives, St. Louis, MO, Joseph Desloge Collection. 3 September 2011. Archived from the original (PDF) on 28 July 2017.
- Novak, Andreas [in German]; Stuhlpfarrer, Gregor (9 March 2018). "Das zweite Leben des Kurt Schuschnigg". ORF (in German).
- Oron, Aryeh (18 November 2025) [August 2016]. "Trapp Family Choir / Singers (Vocal Ensembles)". Bach Cantatas Website.
- "Československý řád Bílého lva 1923–1990" (PDF). Prazskyhradarchiv (in Czech). 28 January 2015.
- Price, G. Ward (1939). Year of Reckoning (PDF). London: Cassell.
- Rees, Laurence (16 October 2017). The Holocaust. Penguin Viking. ISBN 9780241979969. OL 58871805M.
- Ryschka, Birgit (1 January 2008). Constructing and Deconstructing National Identity: Dramatic Discourse in Tom Murphy's The Patriot Game and Felix Mitterer's In Der Löwengrube. Peter Lang. ISBN 9783631581117 – via Google Books.
- "Schuschnigg, Kurt". Saint Louis University Archives. n.d. Archived from the original on 15 March 2026 – via ArchivesSpace.
- Sheridon, R. K. (1942). Kurt von Schuschnigg: a Tribute. London: English Universities Press.
- Schuschnigg, Kurt von (1947). Austrian Requiem. Translated by Hildebrand, Franz von. London: Victor Gollancz.
- Shirer, William Lawrence (1960). The Rise and Fall of the Third Reich: A History of Nazi Germany (1st ed.). New York City: Simon & Schuster. ASIN B0766DKDLR. LCCN 60006729. OCLC 1286630. OL 5794925M. Wikidata Q138029595.
- Shirer, William Lawrence (1990). The Rise and Fall of the Third Reich (Touchstone ed.). New York: Simon & Schuster.
- Tálos, Emmerich [in German] (2013). Das austrofaschistische Herrschaftssystem. Österreich 1933–1938 (in German) (2nd ed.). Wien: LIT. ISBN 9783643504944. LCCN 2013391177. OCLC 853443242. OL 30411943M.
- Tálos, Emmerich [in German]; Neugebauer, Wolfgang [in German] (2005). "Repressionsapparat – und Maßnahmen". Austrofaschismus. Politik – Ökonomie – Kultur 1933–1938 (in German) (5th ed.). Wien: Lit. pp. 298–321. ISBN 978-3-8258-7712-5. OCLC 60375035.
- "n.t.". The Times. London. 26 February 1938.
- "Obituary of Schuschnigg". The Times. London. 19 November 1977.
- Thompson, Dorothy (1939). Let the Record Speak. Boston: Houghton Mifflin. LCCN 39027695. OCLC 391125. OL 6393516M. Reprint of "n.t.". Morning Telegraph. London. 5 January 1938.

Political offices
Preceded by Engelbert Dollfuß	Federal Chancellor of Austria; 1934–1938	Succeeded by Arthur Seyss-Inquart
