= Eduard Baar-Baarenfels =

Austrian politician and diplomat

Oberstleutnant Eduard Baar-Baarenfels
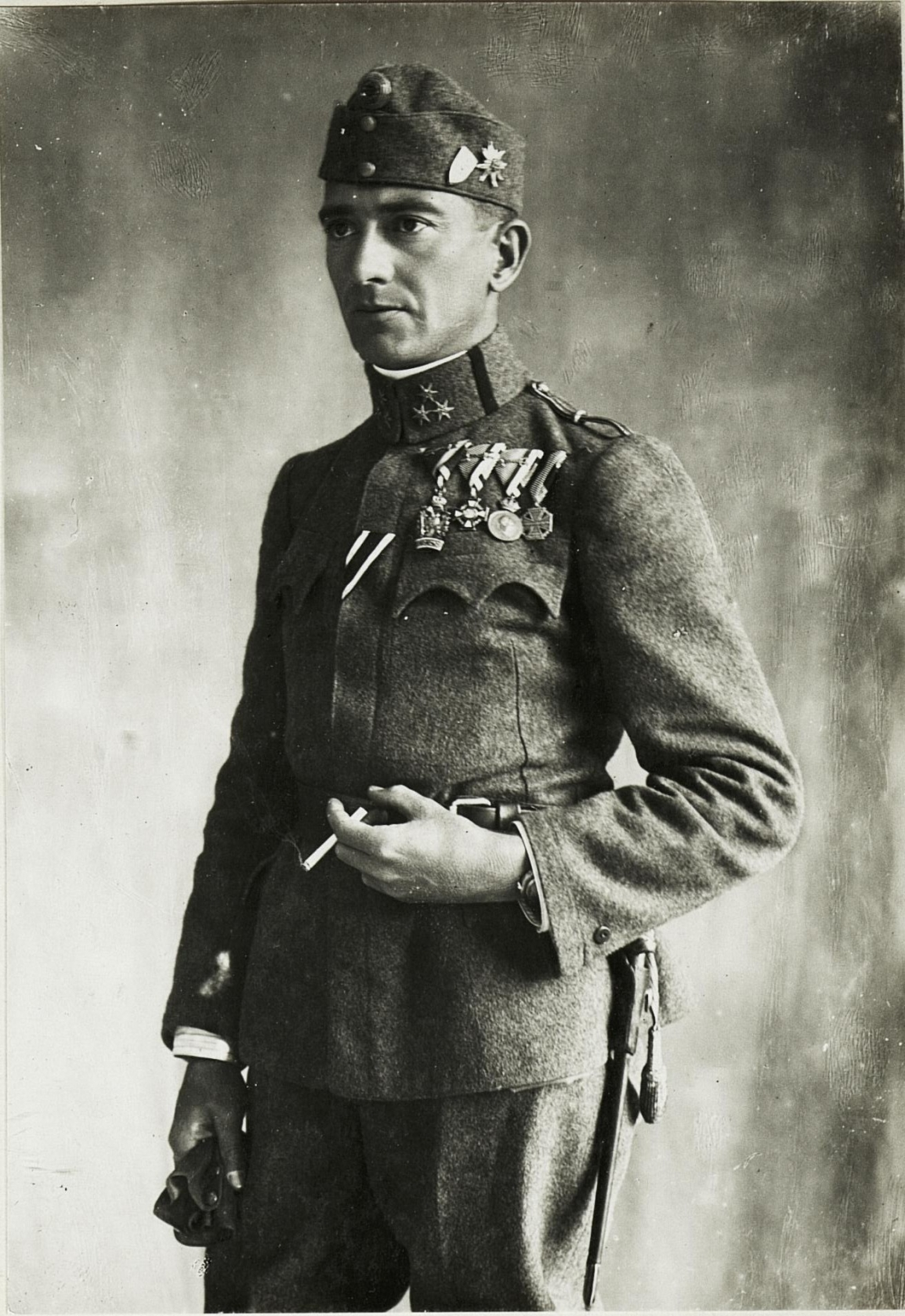
- Baar-Baarenfels in 1917

Vice-Chancellor of Austria
- In office 14 May 1936 – 3 November 1936
- Chancellor: Kurt Schuschnigg
- Preceded by: Ernst Rüdiger Starhemberg
- Succeeded by: Ludwig Hülgerth

Minister of the Interior and Security
- In office 17 October 1935 – 14 May 1936
- Chancellor: Kurt Schuschnigg
- Preceded by: Emil Fey
- Succeeded by: Kurt Schuschnigg

Personal details
- Born: 3 November 1885 Laibach, Austria-Hungary
- Died: 14 March 1967 (aged 81) Saalfelden, Austria
- Party: Heimatblock
- Spouse: Elisabeth Freiin von Risenfels (m. 1919)
- Parent(s): Eduard Baar von Baarenfels (father); Marianne Pelikan (mother)
- Education: Theresian Military Academy
- Occupation: Politician; diplomat; military officer; landowner

Military service
- Allegiance: Austria-Hungary
- Branch/service: Army
- Years of service: 1905 – 1918
- Rank: Oberstleutnant

Eduard Baar-Baarenfels (3 November 1885 – 14 March 1967) was an Austrian politician and diplomat who served as Vice-Chancellor of Austria from May to November 1936 and as Minister of the Interior and Security from 1935 to 1936.

== Early life and education ==
Eduard Baar-Baarenfels was born to Eduard von Baar-Baarenfels and Marianne von Baar-Baarenfels in Laibach on 3 November 1885.

Baar-Baarenfels attended a German elementary school in Laibach, and then a military lower secondary school in Güns, an upper secondary school in Mährisch Weisskirchen, and then the Theresian military academy in Wiener Neustadt.

Baar-Baarenfels married Elisabeth Freiin von Risenfels in 1919.

== Career ==
=== Military ===
Baar-Baarenfels became a Oberstleutnant and was appointed a knight in 1915. During the second World War, he fought on the Russian and Romanian front. He retired in 1918.

=== Political ===
Baar-Baarenfels served as Minister of the Interior and Security from 17 October 1935 to 14 May 1936. He later served as Vice-Chancellor from 14 May 1936 to 3 November 1936, and then as the Ambassador of Austria to Hungary from November 1936 until 1938.

== Later life and death ==
Baar-Baarenfels was firstly retired after Anschluss, but was arrested in April 1938 and taken to the prison Rossauer Lände in Vienna due to the Amstetten district court. In September 1938 he was taken to Dachau concentration camp, and then to Flossenbürg concentration camp the following year, before going back to Dachau in March 1940. He was released in May 1941.

He later moved with his family to Upper Bavaria where he worked in a wood factory in Goldbach. After the end of the war, he moved with his family to Saalfelden where he died in 1967.
