= Sudeten German Party =

Sudeten German Party Sudetendeutsche Partei
- Secretary: Konrad Henlein
- Founded: 1 October 1933
- Dissolved: 5 November 1938
- Merger of: DNSAP, DNP
- Merged into: NSDAP
- Headquarters: Aš, later shifted to Cheb
- Newspaper: Die Zeit
- Paramilitary wings: Volkssport, SFK, FS,
- Membership: 1.35 million (1938 est.)
- Ideology: Nazism: German nationalism; Pan-Germanism; Volksgemeinschaft
- Political position: Far-right
- Colours: Black Red

Party flag

The Sudeten German Party (German: Sudetendeutsche Partei, SdP, Czech: Sudetoněmecká strana) was created by Konrad Henlein under the name Sudetendeutsche Heimatfront ("Front of the Sudeten German Homeland") on 1 October 1933, some months after the First Czechoslovak Republic had outlawed the German National Socialist Workers' Party (Deutsche Nationalsozialistische Arbeiterpartei, DNSAP). In April 1935, the party was renamed Sudetendeutsche Partei following a mandatory demand of the Czechoslovak government. The name was officially changed to Sudeten German and Carpathian German Party (Sudetendeutsche und Karpatendeutsche Partei) in November 1935.

With the rising power of Nazi Party in Germany, the Sudeten German Party became a major pro-Nazi force in Czechoslovakia with the explicit official aim of breaking the country up and joining it to the Third Reich. By June 1938, the party had over 1.3 million members, i.e. 40.6% of ethnic-German citizens of Czechoslovakia. During the last free democratic elections before the German occupation of Czechoslovakia, the May 1938 communal elections, the party gained 88% of ethnic-German votes, taking over control of most municipal authorities in the Czech borderland. The country's mass membership made it one of the largest fascist parties in Europe at the time.

== Background ==
In 1903, a group of Sudeten Germans living in the Bohemian crown lands of the Austro-Hungarian Monarchy created the German Workers' Party (DAP). Influenced by the ideas of pan-Germanism and anti-Slavism, they opposed the Czech National Revival movement advocated by the Young Czech Party. The history of this party is centered on the cities of Eger (German for present-day Cheb) and Aussig (Ústí nad Labem), it originated and gave the impetus for Austrian National Socialism.

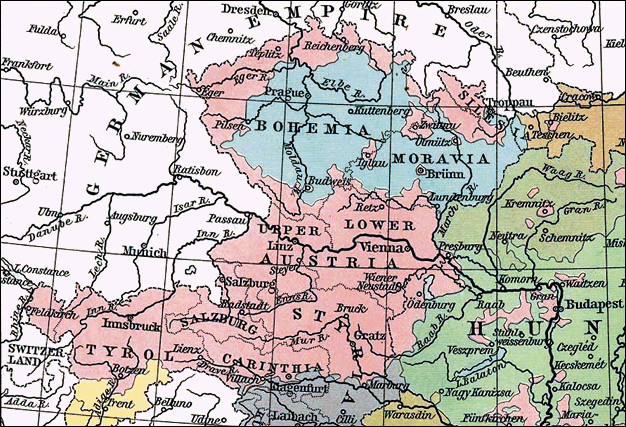
German settlement areas (pink) of Austria–Hungary, 1911

At the end of World War I, the Austro-Hungarian Empire broke up into several nation states. The DAP was renamed German National Socialist Workers' Party on 5 May 1918 and after the proclamation of Czechoslovakia claimed the right of self-determination in the predominantly German-settled Sudetenland and German Bohemian territories, demanding affiliation with the newly established Republic of German-Austria. However, the new Czech-dominated government demanded the unity of the Bohemian (or now called Czech) lands, as confirmed by the 1919 Treaty of Saint-Germain-en-Laye, and considered the Pan-German party offensive and dangerous for the existence of the country. The Czechoslovak DNSAP led by Hans Knirsch together with the conservative German National Party (Deutsche Nationalpartei, DNP) became the main proponent of so-called "negativism", the general tendency among the Sudeten Germans not to accept the legitimacy of the Czechoslovak state. Under Knirsch's successor Rudolf Jung, the party was increasingly influenced by the rise of the Nazi Party in the German Weimar Republic. In 1933, both the DNSAP and DNP decided to dissolve in order to prevent the imminent ban by the Prague government.

== SHF : Sudetendeutsche Heimatfront ("Sudeten German Home Front") ==
The SHF was founded on 1 October 1933. The party entered into an alliance with the Carpatho-German Party (KdP) in the same year.

== Konrad Henlein ==
The newly established SdP did not see itself as a successor of the DNSAP; in fact, SdP leader Konrad Henlein sharply rejected the idea. At first he advocated the Ständestaat concept of the Austrofascist movement according to the ideas of Othmar Spann and would have rather preferred the affiliation with the Federal State of Austria than with Nazi Germany. In his earlier speeches (until 1937), Henlein stressed his distance from German National Socialism, affirming loyalty to the Czechoslovak state and stressing approval of the idea of a cantonal system and individual freedom. He later described his contact to Nazi leaders as merely tactical. In 1935 when Karl Hermann Frank became deputy leader, the SdP gradually adopted the DNSAP tradition and became more radical.

In the parliamentary election of May 1935, the SdP with 1,249,534 (15.2%) of the votes became the strongest of all parties in Czechoslovakia. The party had won about 68% of the German votes, thus surpassing the German Social Democratic Workers Party, the German Christian Social People's Party and the Farmers' League. Meanwhile, the influence exerted by the German Nazi dictatorship became stronger and after 1935 several groups within the party were financed by Germany. In November 1937 Adolf Hitler openly declared – according to the Hossbach Memorandum – his intention to separate the Sudetenland from the Czechoslovak state. The SdP officially coordinated this policy with Nazi leaders in order to integrate the German-speaking parts of Bohemia and Moravia into the German Reich.

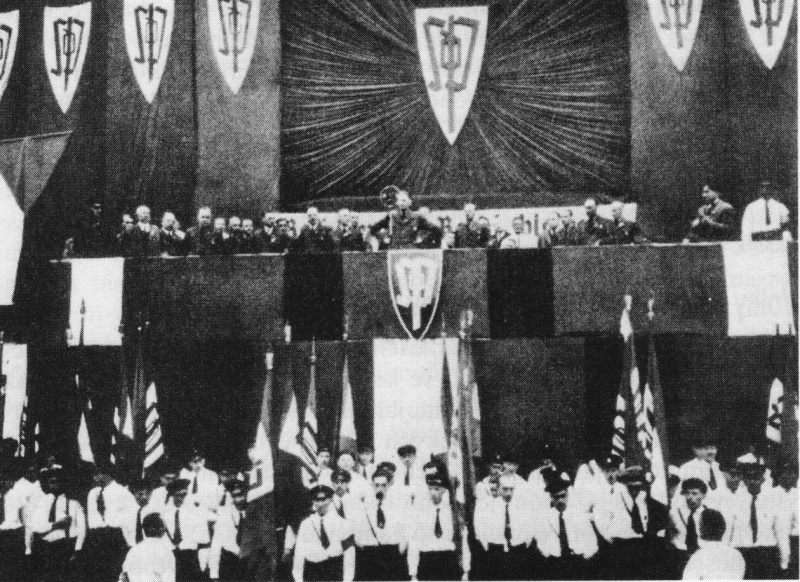
Karl Hermann Frank speaking at the Carlsbad convention of April 1938

After the Austrian Anschluss Henlein first met Hitler on 28 March 1938. His policy was the so-called Grundplanung OA (Basic Planning) of summer 1938 and later in the interior policy of the Protectorate of Bohemia and Moravia. In March 1938 the Farmers League joined the SdP, as well as many Christian Social deputies in the Czechoslovak parliament. At a convention in Carlsbad on 24 April the majority of the party advocated the demand of the Sudeten Germans as an autonomous ethnic group, the separation of a self-governing German settlement area and the freedom to decide for annexation to Nazi Germany. At this time the SdP had about 1.35 million members.

== Annexation ==
In September 1938 the policy of SdP succeeded in the German annexation of Sudetenland according to the Munich Agreement (see: German occupation of Czechoslovakia). On 1 October Henlein was appointed Reichskommissar of the incorporated territories, which became the Reichsgau Sudetenland. After a last convention at Aussig, the organization officially merged into the German Nazi Party at a festive ceremony in Reichenberg (Liberec) on 5 November 1938. However, as many Nazi officials like Reinhard Heydrich were suspicious of the SdP party members, they were not absorbed, but had to apply for admission to the Nazi Party. About 520,000 members were approved, among them Henlein himself who also joined the SS. He was officially appointed Gauleiter in 1939, an office he held until 1945, though largely losing power to Reich Protector Heydrich.

As of October 1938 the SdP/KdP parliamentary club had 52 members from the Chamber of Deputies, and their joint Senate club had 26 members. On 30 October 1938 the parliamentary mandates of 46 deputies and 22 Senators of SdP and KdP were annulled.

The SdP branches in areas that remained in Czechoslovakia after the Sudetenland annexation formed the German People's Group in Czecho-Slovakia (Deutsche Volksgruppe in der Tschecho-Slowakei).

== Electoral results ==
Chamber of Deputies
Election year	# of overall votes	% of overall vote	# of overall seats won	+/–	Leader
1935	1,249,534 (#1)	15.2	44 / 300	▲44	Konrad Henlein

Senate
Election year	# of overall votes	% of overall vote	# of overall seats won	+/–	Leader
1935	1,092,255 (#1)	15.0	22 / 150	▲22	Konrad Henlein

== See also ==
- Germans in Czechoslovakia (1918–1938)
- Sudetendeutsches Freikorps
- Sudetenland
- Nazi Party
- Karl Hermann Frank
- Die Zeit (Prague)
