= Alfred Frauenfeld =

Austrian Nazi politician (1898–1977)

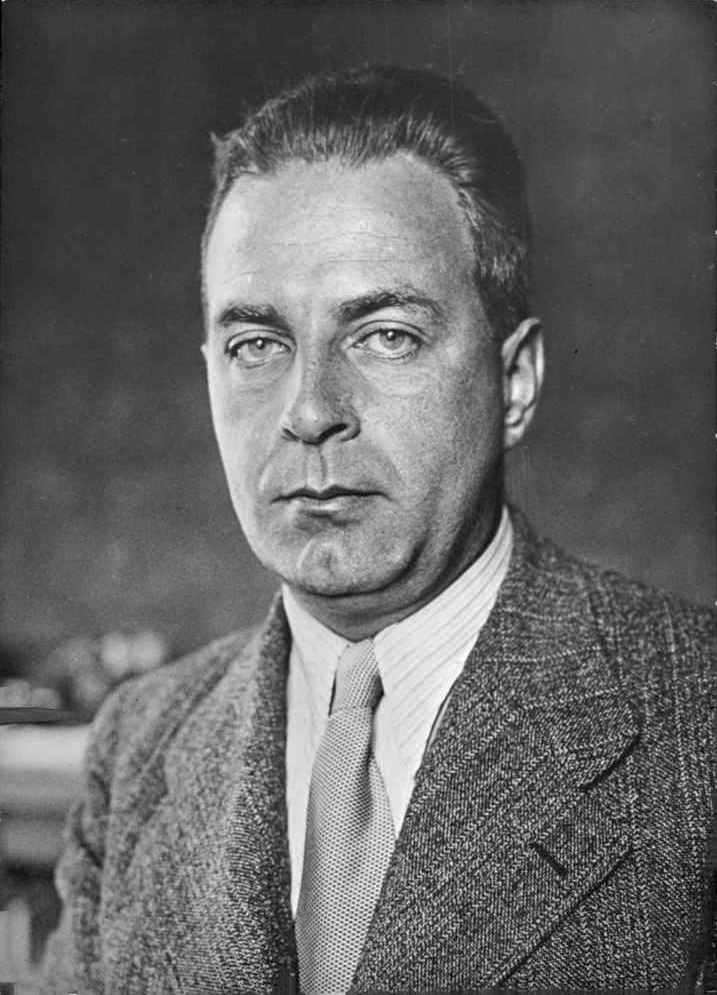
- Frauenfeld, February 1953

Gauleiter of Vienna
- In office 1 January 1930 – 19 June 1933
- Preceded by: Robert Derda
- Succeeded by: Office vacant

Managing Director Reich Theater Chamber
- In office June 1935 – October 1939

Generalkommissar Generalbezirk Krym-Taurien
- In office 1 September 1942 – 5 September 1944
- Preceded by: Position created
- Succeeded by: Position abolished

Personal details
- Born: 18 May 1898 Vienna, Austria-Hungary
- Died: 10 May 1977 (aged 78) Hamburg, West Germany
- Citizenship: Austrian; German (1938-1945)
- Party: Nazi Party
- Other political affiliations: Christian Social Party
- Occupation: Engineer
- Civilian awards: Golden Party Badge

Military service
- Allegiance: Austria-Hungary; Nazi Germany
- Branch/service: Austro-Hungarian Army; Luftwaffe
- Years of service: 1917-1918; 1940-1945
- Rank: Leutnant; Major
- Unit: Feldjägerbattalion 21; Fliegerkompanie 48
- Battles/wars: World War I World War II
- Military awards: Iron Cross, 2nd class War Merit Cross, 1st and 2nd class with Swords

Alfred Eduard Frauenfeld (18 May 1898 – 10 May 1977) was an Austrian Nazi leader. An engineer by occupation, he was associated with the pro-German wing of Austrian Nazism.

== Early life ==
Frauenfeld was born in Vienna, the son of a privy councillor. He attended Volksschule and Realschule there, obtaining his Matura in May 1916. He then entered the Austro-Hungarian Army and fought in the First World War. He saw 15 months of front-line service with Feldjägerbattalion 21 on the Italian front as an officer candidate in the rank of a sergeant with the pay grade of a lance corporal. He then volunteered for the Fliegertruppe (air force), was assigned to Fliegerkompanie 48 and was commissioned as a Leutnant in January 1918. After the war, he resumed his education in civil engineering at the Technische Hochschule in Vienna. Working variously as a mason and a bank clerk, Frauenfeld was initially a member of the Christian Social Party.

== Activism in Austria ==
Frauenfeld first came to prominence in the politics of Vienna, initially in Hermann Hiltl's movement, before becoming a highly influential figure amongst the city's Nazis during the late 1920s. He seems to have joined the Austrian Nazi Party in August 1929 and very quickly took on the role of Bezirksleiter (District Leader) for the Wieden District of Vienna. He was confirmed by Adolf Hitler as Nazi Gauleiter of all Vienna in 1930. In this role he became hugely active, organising over 1,000 propaganda meetings in three years and founding the party newspaper Der Kampfruf (The Battle Cry) with his own money in 1930, before ultimately running four Nazi dailies and four weeklies. Under his command the Nazis became an important force in Vienna, winning almost ten times as many votes in the 1932 municipal elections as they did in 1930. From a few hundred members when he took over, Frauenfeld expanded the Viennese party to 40,000 members by 1934. Frauenfeld's success saw him considered for the post of leader of the Austrian Nazi Party in 1931, although ultimately Theodor Habicht was chosen for the role by Gregor Strasser on Hitler's advice. Despite his success as an organiser, Frauenfeld also had a reputation for a domineering and impolite temperament, something which ensured a frosty relationship with other leading Austrian Nazis Josef Leopold and Alfred Proksch.

In April 1932, Frauenfeld was elected to the Municipal Council and Landtag of Vienna where he led the Nazi faction. Because of his violent rhetoric, he was banned from speaking and writing publicly by the Austrian authorities in May 1933. However, he continued to write under the pseudonym "Johannes Mahr". Frauenfeld became associated with the terrorist activities of the Nazis within Austria, and the Nazi Party was banned on 19 June 1933 following a violent hand grenade attack on an auxiliary police unit in Krems. In December, Frauenfeld was briefly detained and deported to Germany, however, he crossed back into Austria almost immediately. Frauenfeld was again arrested and held at Wöllersdorf internment camp from December 1933 to May 1934. Austrian Chancellor Engelbert Dollfuss actually offered Frauenfeld a cabinet post in May 1934, in an attempt to avoid rebellion but he refused the offer and fled to Germany.

== Career in Nazi Germany ==
Frauenfeld obtained a position in the Nazi Party headquarters in Munich in May 1934, working with the Landesleitung (state leadership) of the now-underground Austrian Nazi Party He was closely involved with Habicht in planning the abortive July Putsch of 1934. After the failure of the putsch, Frauenfeld remained in Germany. He was something of a patron of the arts, and enjoyed a close relationship with the conductor Clemens Krauss and had also been an actor. Therefore, in June 1935, he joined the Reich Theatre Chamber, a component of the Reich Chamber of Culture. He was named to its Präsidialrat (presidential council) and served as its Geschäftsführer (Managing Director) until 1939. In November 1935, he was named to the Reich Cultural Senate and became a Reichsredner (national speaker) for the Party, engaging in propaganda activities. On 29 March 1936, Frauenfeld was elected as a deputy to the Reichstag from electoral constituency 13, Schleswig-Holstein. At the election of 10 April 1938, he switched to constituency 22, Düsseldorf East, a seat he retained until the fall of the Nazi regime.

Following the March 1938 Anschluss, of which Frauenfeld had long been an advocate, the popular local was a leading choice for the role of Gauleiter of Vienna. However, in what proved to be a fraught selection process Frauenfeld lost out to Odilo Globocnik, an old rival from Carinthia. He was instead given the title of Honorary Gauleiter and was also awarded the Golden Party Badge. He was not sidelined completely, however, and found a number of positions within the Nazi administration.

=== Wartime assignments ===
In October 1939, after the onset of the Second World War, Frauenfeld was named as a Generalkonsul (counsel general) in the Reich Ministry of Foreign Affairs and became the ministry's representative to the Army. In April 1940, he was called up for military service with the Luftwaffe with the rank of Leutnant of reserves, eventually advancing to Major. He was sent to Oslo, where he was charged with establishing an information and propaganda department at the German embassy. In June, he moved to Copenhagen where he performed the same task. He was subsequently assigned as the foreign ministry liaison officer to army units in France (July 1940), the Balkans (April 1941) and the Soviet Union (June 1941).

On 1 September 1942, Frauenfeld was appointed as the Generalkommissar for the Generalbezirk Krym-Taurien with headquarters in Melitopol where he served under Reichskommissar Erich Koch, of the Reichskommissariat Ukraine. In fact, Frauenfeld had jurisdiction over only an area north of the Isthmus of Perekop, with the Crimean peninsula remaining under military administration throughout the war. In this role, Professor Dietrich Orlow grouped him along with the Generalkommissar for Belarus, Wilhelm Kube, as being a "rehab" - that is to say a Nazi who had fallen from grace but was able to make a comeback in the eastern administration. Frauenfeld did not share the ruthlessness of Koch, and the Austrian's unwillingness to follow a policy of brutality towards the local population led to a series of public spats between the two men. On 10 February 1944, he even wrote a lengthy memorandum that was highly critical of Koch and his policies, and disputed his accounts of the situation in Ukraine, thereby earning Koch's lasting enmity.

While Frauenfeld's time in charge saw a surprisingly high level of co-operation between the occupation government and the local administration, it has been argued that this was more the work of Erich von Manstein and that Frauenfeld instead spent most of his time in the Crimea trying to prove the Gothic origins of local culture. He had also hoped to transfer the South Tyrolean population to the region in order to unite them with their kin as a common Nazi belief suggested that the German inhabitants of South Tyrol were descendants of Goths. Frauenfeld further wished to settle the Volga Germans and the Russian Germans of North America to the peninsula. Frauenfeld's role had originally been intended for his fellow Austrian Josef Leopold, although his death left the position open.

In August 1943, Frauenfeld petitioned Heinrich Himmler unsuccessfully requesting admission to the SS. When the Red Army was closing in on Melitopol in September 1943, Frauenfeld moved his headquarters to Simferopol. By the following May, all of the Crimea had been retaken by the Soviet forces. In the autumn of 1944, Frauenfeld was back in Vienna where he was employed as the leader of the city's Wehrmacht propaganda department. At this time, he was considered as a possible replacement for Baldur von Schirach as Gauleiter of Vienna but, again, this did not come to pass and Schirach remained in office.

== Post-war activity ==
Frauenfeld, who finished the war in Germany, was tried and sentenced in absentia to 15 years imprisonment by a Vienna court in 1947. According to a British secret service report, he was a member of Bruderschaft (Brotherhood), a secret society of crypto-Nazis founded on 22 July 1949 in Hamburg where he was manager of a construction firm. He also was close to Gustav Adolf Scheel who was active in similar secret societies. From 1951 to January 1953, Frauenfeld was a member of the Naumann Circle, a group of former Nazis that tried to infiltrate the West German political parties. In 1951, Frauenfeld helped found the Freikorps Deutschland, a Neo-Nazi paramilitary. The organization managed to train roughly 2,000 men, but was unable to obtain weapons to overthrow the government. On 10 February 1953, the West German government banned the Freikorps Deutschland and arrested four of its leaders, including Fraunefeld, for plotting against the government. However, Frauenfeld was released from custody several days later, and the charges against him were later dropped. He lived out his remaining days in Hamburg, dying in 1977.

== Sources ==
- Miller, Michael D.; Schulz, Andreas (2012). Gauleiter: The Regional Leaders of the Nazi Party and Their Deputies, 1925–1945. Vol. 1 (Herbert Albrecht - H. Wilhelm Hüttmann). R. James Bender Publishing. ISBN 978-1-932-97021-0.
- Parkinson, F., ed. (1989). Conquering the Past: Austrian Nazism Yesterday & Today. Wayne State University. ISBN 978-0-814-32054-9.
- Rees, Philip (1990). Biographical Dictionary of the Extreme Right Since 1890. Simon & Schuster. ISBN 978-0-130-89301-7.
