= Rudolf Jung =

German Bohemian Nazi and SS-Gruppenführer (1882–1945)

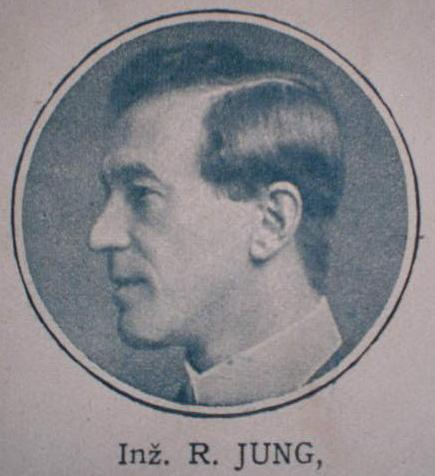
- Jung in 1921

Plenipotentiary for Labor Deployment, Protectorate of Bohemia and Moravia
- In office December 1944 – 8 May 1945
- Succeeded by: Office abolished

Gauleiter
- In office 15 June 1938 – 8 May 1945
- Preceded by: Office established
- Succeeded by: Office abolished

Member of the Reichstag
- In office 29 March 1936 – 8 May 1945

Chairman, German National Socialist Workers' Party of Czechoslovakia
- In office 17 May 1926 – 4 October 1933
- Succeeded by: Office abolished

Member of the Czechoslovak Chamber of Deputies
- In office 18 April 1920 – 11 November 1933

Personal details
- Born: 16 April 1882 Plaß, Bohemia, Austria-Hungary
- Died: 11 December 1945 (aged 63) Pankrác Prison, Prague, Czechoslovakia
- Cause of death: Suicide by hanging
- Party: DAP (1909–1919); DNSAP (1919–1933); Nazi Party (1935–1945)
- Education: Technische Hochschule Wien
- Profession: Engineer
- Civilian awards: Golden Party Badge

Military service
- Allegiance: Austria-Hungary; Nazi Germany
- Branch/service: Austro-Hungarian Navy; Schutzstaffel
- Years of service: 1905–1906; 1936–1945
- Rank: Seekadett; SS-Gruppenführer
- Military awards: War Merit Cross, 1st and 2nd class, without Swords

Rudolf Jung (16 April 1882 – 11 December 1945) was a Nazi theoretician and the head of the German Bohemian Nazi movement from 1926 to 1933 before he immigrated to Germany. He joined the Nazi Party, was made an Honorary Gauleiter and became an SS-Gruppenführer. After the end of World War II, he was arrested and imprisoned by the Czechoslovak government but committed suicide before he could be brought to trial.

== Biography ==
=== Early life and education ===
Jung was born the son of a railway official in Plasy, Bohemia when it was part of Austria-Hungary, and attended the German-language Volksschule and Oberrealschule between 1888 and 1900 in Iglau (today, Jihlava). He studied mechanical engineering at the Technische Hochschule in Vienna, graduating with a degree in engineering in 1905. While a student, he joined the Burschenschaft Markomannia, a student association, and he was the student body chairman in 1903–1904. He passed his state engineering examination in July 1905. Beginning in October of that year, he performed military service as a one-year volunteer with the Austro-Hungarian Navy in the rank of Seekadett, and was assigned to the protected cruiser SMS Kaiserin Elisabeth. Returning to civilian life, Jung entered government service in October 1906 with the Imperial Royal Austrian State Railways as a mechanical engineer, later becoming an inspector and workshop manager in Vienna and Reichenberg (today, Liberec). In 1907, he joined the völkisch Reich League of German Railway Workers and became a member of the leadership from 15 June 1908.

=== Political activities in Austria-Hungary and Czechoslovakia ===
On 1 July 1909, Jung joined the pan-German German Workers' Party (DAP) and became an ardent party agitator. Jung was fired from his railway job in 1910 because of his political activism but the party put him on its payroll and he devoted himself to theoretical work. Along with Dr. Walter Riehl, Jung drafted a revised party program at Iglau in 1913 "which contained a more detailed comparison of international Marxism and national socialism to highlight their ideological differences and a more pointed attack on capitalism, democracy, alien peoples, and Jews. Here, anti-Semitism ranked behind anti-Slavism, anti-clericalism and anti-capitalism". The Iglau program would serve as the basis from which Jung's later political theories, and those of the forthcoming Nazi movement in Germany, would evolve. During this period Jung coined the slogan "Gemeinnutz geht vor Eigennutz" (common good comes before self-interest). This would become a central tenet of Nazi ideology. During the First World War, he advocated that Germans seize Lebensraum in the east.

In June 1913, Jung was elected as a DAP delegate to the Moravian Landtag (state parliament) and at the time was its youngest member. He also served as a city councilor in Iglau. In 1915, city authorities banned him from public speaking for allegedly arousing working class discontent over food shortages. At a meeting in Vienna in early May 1918, the DAP was renamed the Deutsche Nationalsozialistische Arbeiterpartei (DNSAP) and Jung became member number 85. He was also the chief author of the new DNSAP program, which advocated for Austrian union with the German Reich. The program predated the German Nazi Party's 25-point Program by almost two years. Soon however, the DNSAP had split in two as a result of the establishment of the nation of Czechoslovakia, its Bohemian and Austrian branches forced to reconstitute themselves as separate independent parties. On 16 November 1919, Jung left the Austrian branch and became a member of the DNSAP of Czechoslovakia. Jung became Second Chairman of the Party under First Chairman Hans Knirsch, and also served as the Deputy Chairman of the Moravian-Silesian Region. He became the publisher of the German-language Party newspaper Neuen Zeit (New Time) in Troppau (today, Opava), as well as the co-editor of the monthly magazine Volk und Gemeinder (People and Community).

In 1919, Jung completed his theoretical work Der Nationale Sozialismus: Seine Grundlagen, Sein Werdegang, und Seine Ziele (National Socialism: its Foundations, its Development, and its Goals). In his introduction, he expressed the hope that his book would play the same role for National Socialism that Das Kapital had for Marxist international socialism.

The impact of Jung’s work cannot be overstated, despite its obscurity now. Nationale Sozialismus anticipated Gottfried Feder’s Der deutsche Staat auf nationaler und sozialer Grundlage (The German State on a National and Social Basis) by four years, Hitler’s Mein Kampf by six, and Alfred Rosenberg’s Der Mythus des zwanzigsten Jahrhunderts (The Myth of the 20th Century) by over a decade. It was the first major work dealing with National Socialist theory and ideology, and it was to provide all subsequent works with much of their tone, their substance, and their slogans ... Jung’s book is one of the great overlooked works of National Socialist political theory.

From 18 April 1920 until 11 November 1933, Jung sat as a deputy in the Czechoslovak Chamber of Deputies, serving as the faction leader of the DNSAP deputies in that body. He is reported to have helped influence the German Workers' Party, the DNSAP's counterpart in Germany, to include the term "National Socialist" in its name on 24 February 1920, to emphasize its anti-capitalist stance and to align itself with the Austrian and Czechoslovak parties. Adolf Hitler, at that time a 30-year-old rising orator in the German DAP, wanted to rename it the "Social Revolutionary Party". Jung first met Hitler on 7 August 1920 in Salzburg, at an inter-state conference of National Socialists from several central European nations. Though aimed at forging fraternal connections among them, Hitler characteristically avoided tying himself too closely to these other groups. Jung, however, frequently collaborated with the German Nazis throughout the 1920s. He spoke alongside Hitler on the theme of "National Socialism and Germany's Future" at the Sofiensaal in Vienna on 17 June 1922. Jung dedicated the third edition of his book to Hitler in 1923 and, following Hitler's imprisonment in the wake of the failed Beer Hall Putsch of November of that year, Jung frequently visited Hitler in Landsberg Prison. After one of these meetings, Jung described Hitler in a newspaper article as a martyr of the movement and compared him to Jesus. In March 1926, Jung attended a Nazi Party rally in Essen along with Joseph Goebbels, who was a leader of the Party in the Ruhr at that time. Together with his fellow DNSAP leader and parliamentarian Hans Krebs, Jung also attended the Nuremberg Nazi Party rally on 19–21 August 1927.

Jung advanced to First Chairman of the DNSAP on 17 May 1926, a post he would hold until the Party was officially banned by the Czech authorities in October 1933. On 1 May 1931, he also entered the leadership of the DNSAP's paramilitary organization, the Volkssport Verband (People's Sport Association). It was formed under the guise of a sporting and hiking organization but was based on the model of the Nazi Party Sturmabteilung (SA) in Germany. Its members wore brown uniforms like those of the SA and staged large rallies and marches agitating for unification with Germany. They held joint exercises with the SA and in one of these, in January 1931, SA troops crossed the border into Czech territory. The Czechoslovak government first banned the wearing of the brown uniform and, on 1 March 1932, outlawed the organization entirely. Several Volkssport Verband members were indicted and put on trial for high treason in Brno between 8 August and 24 September 1932. During the trial, Jung was implicated but was protected by parliamentary immunity. The DNSAP was banned by the Czechoslovak government on 4 October 1933; Jung was arrested that day and was expelled from his parliamentary seat on 11 November. Released from prison after seven months, his effectiveness was limited as he was deprived of his power base and placed under surveillance by the police.

=== Career in Nazi Germany ===
Jung left Czechoslovakia and emigrated to Germany on 14 September 1935. He joined the Nazi Party, was granted an effective date of 1 April 1925 and was assigned his old DNSAP party membership number of 85. He was granted German citizenship two months later and, on 1 December, was appointed as a lecturer at the Deutsche Hochschule für Politik (German Academy for Politics) in Berlin. The Technische Hochschule zu Berlin granted him an honorary doctorate in engineering on 9 April 1936. Hitler, on 9 June 1938, awarded the title of professor to Jung who then held a professorship at the Academy to 1940, lecturing in political theory and publishing numerous works on ideological issues as well as articles agitating against the Czech people and the Czech state. Jung also became involved in politics and, on 29 March 1936, he was elected as a deputy to the Reichstag for electoral constituency 6, Pomerania. After the 10 April 1938 election, he represented constituency 18, Westphalia South. On 15 June 1938, Hitler appointed him an honorary Gauleiter of the Nazi Party. He was also awarded the Golden Party Badge.

Jung joined the SS (membership number 276,690) on 17 June 1936 with the rank of SS-Sturmbannführer and was attached to the staff of Reichsführer-SS Heinrich Himmler. He was also appointed as a part-time employee of the Sicherheitsdienst (SD). He progressively moved up the SS ranks to SS-Obersturmbannführer (9 November 1936), SS-Standartenführer (30 January 1937) SS-Oberführer (12 September 1937) SS-Brigadeführer (30 January 1941) and, finally, SS-Gruppenführer (16 April 1942).

In 1938, Jung was made a member of the Scientific Council of the German Foreign Institute in Stuttgart. In October of that year, following the Munich Agreement and the cession of the Sudetenland to Germany, he hoped for a high level leadership appointment in the new territory but was only made the department head for economy and agriculture in the administration set up by Reichskommissar and Gauleiter Konrad Henlein. Reports in July 1939 indicated that he was to replace the rector of the Charles University in Prague, however the appointment went to Wilhelm Saure. From 1 February 1940 to 1 September 1943, Jung was appointed by Reichsminister for Labor Franz Seldte as the President of the State Labor Office for central Germany (Thuringia, Saxony & Anhalt) based in Erfurt. Additionally, in March 1942, he was placed on the technical staff of Fritz Sauckel, the General Plenipotentiary for the Allocation of Labor, and acted as his authorized representative. Sauckel proposed Jung for the post of undersecretary in the Labor Ministry, but this did not materialize. In March 1943, Jung's name also was proposed as the Primátor (mayor) of Prague but no appointment was made. On 1 September 1943, Jung was made an honorary Inspector and head of the Reich Inspectorate for Labor Administration in Berlin but was placed in temporary retirement in November. He then was employed as the general director of the Prague Credit Union from 1 May 1944 and also served as honorary chairman of the Reinhard Heydrich Endowment in Prague. In December 1944, he obtained an appointment as the Plenipotentiary for Labor Deployment in the Protectorate of Bohemia and Moravia.

In the SS, Jung was attached to the SS-Oberabschnitt Fulda-Werra in Bad Arolsen from 1 April to 1 December 1944, and then transferred to SS-Oberabschnitt Böhmen-Mähren headquartered in Prague. In March 1945, as the Red Army approached from the east, he sent his family back to Germany for safety but he remained at his post until the end of the war in Europe.

=== Post-war ===
On 5 May 1945, Jung was arrested in Prague during the Prague uprising and imprisoned in Pankrác Prison. On 11 December 1945, he committed suicide by hanging himself in his prison cell before being brought to trial for his role in the German occupation.

== Career dissatisfaction ==
Given Jung's long history as a pioneer of Nazism, his early and close association with Hitler and his strong association with his homeland, his outlook for a successful career should have been assured once Nazi Germany took control of Czechoslovakia. However, it was not to be.

Jung, then, must have been particularly satisfied when the Reich finally annexed the Sudetenland in 1938, followed by the rest of the Czech lands in early 1939. Jung’s hope was that he would have a place in the administration of this new region of the Reich, aspiring to be made Gauleiter, mayor of Prague or, at the very least, Rektor of Prague University. Jung, to his chagrin, was to be passed over ... He and his family did move back to the newly-christened ‘Protectorate of Bohemia and Moravia’ in 1943, but only so Jung could take up the post of Reich Inspector for Labor Management in the Protectorate, a fairly unassuming public service role ... Those who knew Jung in this period, so close to the end of the War and also (unbeknownst to him) to the end of his life, reported that he was an unsatisfied man. At one time Jung had been a key leader in an international political movement, a major thinker who saw himself (and was seen by others) as the ‘Karl Marx’ of a vital new economic worldview. Now, however, that same movement had passed Jung by, had grown beyond his control, and had left him behind as a minor official in a minor part of the Reich.

== Selected writings ==
Jung produced many books on the topic of Nazi theory and on the German-Czech conflict. Below is a sample of his most important works.

- Der nationale Sozialismus, Seine Grundlagen, sein Werdegang und seine Ziele (first edition, 1919; Ernst Boepple's Deutscher Volksverlag; second edition, 1922; third edition, 1923)
- Der Rassengedanke im nationalen Sozialismus (1923)
- Der nationale Sozialismus im Sudetendeutschtum (1933)
- Die Tschechen: Tausend Jahre deutsch-tschechischer Kampf (1937)
- Böhmen und das Reich (1938)
- Die Schicksalsfrage Mitteleuropas (1938)

== See also ==
- List of people who died by suicide by hanging

== Sources ==
- ARPLAN – Profile: Rudolf Jung, The "Karl Marx" of German National Socialism
- Evans, Richard J. (2005). The Coming of the Third Reich. New York: Penguin Press. ISBN 978-0-143-03469-8.
- Fischer, Klaus P. (1995). Nazi Germany: A New History. New York: Continuum Publishing Group. ISBN 978-0-826-40797-9.
- Klee, Ernst (2007). Das Personenlexikon zum Dritten Reich. Wer war was vor und nach 1945. Frankfurt-am-Main: Fischer-Taschenbuch-Verlag. ISBN 978-3-596-16048-8.
- Longerich, Peter (2019). Hitler: A Biography. Oxford University Press. ISBN 978-0-190-05673-5.
- Miller, Michael D.; Schulz, Andreas (2017). Gauleiter: The Regional Leaders of the Nazi Party and Their Deputies, 1925–1945. Vol. 2 (Georg Joel - Dr. Bernhard Rust). R. James Bender Publishing. ISBN 978-1-932-97032-6.
