= DNSAP =

DNSAP may stand for:

- Danmarks Nationalsocialistiske Arbejderparti - the Danish Nazi party
- Deutsche Nationalsozialistische Arbeiterpartei - an Austrian Pan-Germanic party in the early 20th century
- German National Socialist Workers' Party (Czechoslovakia) - a German far-right nationalist party in Czechoslovakia, 1919–1933

== See also ==
- NSDAP
