= German National Socialist Workers' Party =

German National Socialist Workers' Party may refer to:

- German National Socialist Workers' Party (Austria)
- German National Socialist Workers' Party (Czechoslovakia)

Not to be confused with the National Socialist German Workers' Party, which both of these parties eventually folded into.
