= Josef Leopold =

Austrian Nazi Party politician (1889–1941)

Landesleiter of Austria
- In office 29 January 1935 – 21 February 1938
- Succeeded by: Hubert Klausner

Gauleiter of Lower Austria
- In office 29 August 1927 – 21 February 1938
- Preceded by: Leopold Eder
- Succeeded by: Hugo Jury

Deputy Gauleiter of Lower Austria
- In office 5 September 1926 – 29 August 1927
- Preceded by: Position established

Additional positions
- 1938–1941: Honorary Gauleiter
- 1938–1941: Reichstag Deputy

Personal details
- Born: 18 February 1889 Langenlois, Lower Austria, Austria-Hungary
- Died: 24 July 1941 (aged 52) Malyn, Ukrainian SSR, Soviet Union
- Citizenship: Austrian, German (after 1938)
- Party: Nazi Party
- Other political affiliations: Social Democratic Party of Austria; Deutsche Nationalsozialistische Arbeiterpartei
- Spouse: Sidonie Saxeneder
- Occupation: Military officer
- Civilian awards: Golden Party Badge; Blood Order

Military service
- Allegiance: Austria-Hungary; Austria; Nazi Germany
- Branch/service: Austro-Hungarian Army; Volkswehr; German Army
- Years of service: 1910-1918; 1918-1933; 1939-1941
- Rank: Stabsfeldwebel; Hauptmann; Oberstleutnant
- Unit: 49th Infantry Regiment; 6th Infantry Regiment
- Commands: 1st Feldjäger Battalion
- Battles/wars: World War I World War II
- Military awards: Medal for Bravery (Austria-Hungary), 1st and 2nd class Iron Cross, 2nd class

Josef Leopold (18 February 1889 – 24 July 1941) was the Nazi Party Gauleiter of Lower Austria from 1927 to 1938, as well as the Party's Landesleiter (state leader) and the head of the Sturmabteilung (SA) for all of Austria from 1935 to 1938. He belonged to the faction within Austrian Nazism that supported an independent Austrian Nazi state rather than a union with Germany. Adolf Hitler removed him from office just before the Anschluss with Germany. At the outbreak of the Second World War, Leopold joined the German Army and was killed during Operation Barbarossa, the invasion of the Soviet Union.

== Early life and military career ==
Leopold was born in Langenlois, in the rural Waldviertel region of Lower Austria, and attended Volksschule there until 1904. After one year of study at a specialized fruit and viticulture school, he worked on his father's small farm. Leopold then decided on a military career, joining the 49th Infantry Regiment of the Austro-Hungarian Army on 7 October 1910. Following the outbreak of the First World War, he served as a platoon leader with the rank of Stabsfeldwebel, and saw action on the eastern front until 1 August 1915, when he was captured by forces of the Imperial Russian Army. He was sent to Siberia as a prisoner of war where he remained until February 1918 when he escaped, returning to Austria.

Leopold became an instructor of new recruits in Vienna and, after the end of the war, he remained in military service with the Volkswehr. Following the reorganisation of the military after the establishment of the republic, he was retained in the newly renamed Bundesheer and attended the military school at Enns. Commissioned as a Leutnant in March 1919, he was assigned to the 6th Infantry Regiment in July 1920, based in Krems an der Donau. He became its training officer in August 1923, where he remained until 1925. By 1927, he was promoted to Oberleutnant and assigned as an artillery officer in a mountain howitzer battery. Advanced to the rank of Hauptmann in January 1931, he became the commander of the 1st Feldjäger Battalion on 1 July 1931.

== Entry into politics ==
Leopold's initial involvement in politics came in December 1918 when he joined the Social Democratic Party of Austria. However, by March 1919 he had switched sides to join Walter Riehl's Deutsche Nationalsozialistische Arbeiterpartei and he became a convinced activist in the party after hearing Adolf Hitler speak at Krems in 1920. Leopold quickly rose through the Party ranks, from Ortsgruppenleiter in Krems in 1924 to Kreisleiter of the Waldviertel district in 1925 and, by September 1926, he formally joined the Nazi Party (membership number 50,416) and was made leader of the Sturmabteilung in Lower Austria, as well as Deputy Gauleiter of that region. As an early member of the Party, he would later be awarded the Golden Party Badge. On 29 August 1927, he was personally appointed by Hitler to the post of Gauleiter of Lower Austria. From 21 May 1932 to 23 June 1933, he was a member of the Lower Austrian Landtag and leader of the Nazi faction in that body, as well as a member of the Landesrat (state council).

Leopold belonged to the pro-independence faction within Austrian Nazism and insisted that Adolf Hitler was only a spiritual leader rather than the future Austrian leader. Leopold's faction within Austrian Nazism was underground in nature and frequently launched terrorist attacks. His position as an extremist who supported independence meant that he clashed with the pro-Greater Germany wing of Theodor Habicht and the constitutional pro-independence wing under Anton Reinthaller.

On 19 June 1933, 32 auxiliary policemen in Krems were wounded by hand grenades in a terrorist attack by Nazis, and the Austrian government of Chancellor Engelbert Dollfuß responded by outlawing the Nazi Party in Austria. Leopold subsequently was removed from his positions in the Landtag and the Landesrat, and he also was discharged from the Austrian Army on 31 August 1933. The only Gauleiter who refused to flee Austria, he was arrested on 16 September and held for investigation until 1 February 1934 when he was released for lack of evidence. Rearrested on 5 May of the same year, he was interned in Wöllersdorf concentration camp until July.

== Leadership of the Austrian Nazis ==
Leopold was appointed the Landesleiter of the banned Austrian Nazi Party on 29 January 1935 and the leader of all SA troops in Austria in June. However, he was again interned in Wöllersdorf later that month for distribution of propaganda pamphlets. Over a year later, on 11 July 1936, Hitler concluded an agreement with Chancellor Kurt Schuschnigg, recognising Austria's sovereignty and agreeing that Austrian National Socialism was a "domestic matter" over which Germany would exert no direct or indirect influence. In return, Austria agreed to an amnesty of imprisoned Nazis, and Leopold obtained his freedom on 23 July. Although officially still the party leader, Leopold found that during his time in prison much of the power within the party passed to Friedrich Rainer and Odilo Globocnik who, on Hitler's express instructions, were seeking to build alliances with more conservative leaders such as Arthur Seyss-Inquart and even Schuschnigg.

Later in 1936, Leopold began negotiating with Schuschnigg in an attempt to regain legal status for the Nazi Party. Leopold hoped through this to become part of a coalition government and to eventually form an independent Nazi government in Austria. He then sought to work more closely with other nationalist groups in order to come closer to his ideal of a Nazi Austria and, in this endeavour, won the backing of cabinet ministers Edmund Glaise-Horstenau and Odo Neustädter-Stürmer. Despite this, the talks with Schuschnigg came to nothing and Leopold's desires to see the Nazis recognised and to establish a coalition known as the Deutschsozialer Volksbund were left unfulfilled. Indeed, Leopold came out of the negotiations badly, as not only were his plans to reconstitute the Nazi Party as part of the Fatherland's Front made public, but he also failed to secure an offer of a cabinet post as he had hoped.

His failures in the negotiations and his pro-independence stance meant that Hitler did not trust Leopold, who he felt might use the SA to try to seize power on his own, perhaps by force. Therefore, he sent Wilhelm Keppler to keep a watch on him in July 1937. However, Keppler was told by Leopold that he took orders from no one. Heinrich Himmler made him leader of the Austrian Schutzstaffel in 1937, but he soon grew tired of the quarrelsome Leopold, who also had clashes with Hermann Göring, Rudolf Hess, Franz von Papen and his co-leader of the Austrian Nazis Hermann Neubacher. While leading the Nazis in Vienna during 1938, Leopold boasted to British Union of Fascists representative Robert Gordon-Canning that he was about to lead an uprising with Hitler's aid. However, the conversation was picked up by Schuschnigg who had Leopold's office raided, where documents relating to the coup plot were seized. Hitler finally dismissed Leopold as Landesleiter on 21 February 1938, on the pretext that he wanted Austrian Nazis to follow legality. Hitler, who had been due to hold talks with Schuschnigg, was especially annoyed that Leopold had launched a bombing campaign in the run-up to the meeting, and so acted quickly to remove him.

== Career in Nazi Germany ==
Following the Anschluss, Leopold was able to continue his career within the Nazi Party in Germany, despite his earlier support for an independent Austria. However, he never attained the level of leadership that he had wielded in Austria. He was considered for the role of Gauleiter of Reichsgau Lower Danube, although this role went to Hugo Jury instead. On 21 February 1938, Leopold was granted the title of Honorary Gauleiter. At the parliamentary election of 10 April, he was elected as a Nazi deputy to the Reichstag from the newly renamed Ostmark. On 23 May, he was appointed as a Party Reichsinspekteur in Munich on the staff of Deputy Führer Hess and promoted to the rank of SA-Gruppenführer. This was followed on 1 June by his being named an honorary Führer of Vienna's SA-Gruppe Donau. On 30 January 1939, he was awarded the Nazi Party's Blood Order decoration.

== Wartime service and death ==
On the outbreak of the Second World War, Leopold volunteered for service in the German Army. With the rank of Oberstleutnant, he commanded of a reserve battalion of Austrian troops in the Battle of France and in the invasion of the Soviet Union. He died on 24 July 1941 at the eastern front as a result of an accident with a Romanian soldier's grenade. He had been Reich Minister Alfred Rosenberg's choice for the post of Generalkommissar for Crimea, but the job ultimately went to fellow-Austrian Alfred Frauenfeld.

== Post-war legal actions against Leopold's wife ==
In October 1945, Leopold's widow, Sidonie née Saxeneder (16 August 1894 – 19 July 1980) was tried by the Vienna People's Court for her Nazi Party membership. She had been a member since 1927, and had been awarded the Golden Party Badge. On 8 October 1945, Sidonie was sentenced to two-and-a-half years in prison and had her assets confiscated.

== Sources ==
- Bischof, Günter; Pelinka, Anton (1996). Austro-Corporatism: Past, Present, Future. Routledge. ISBN 978-1-560-00833-0.
- Dorril, Stephen (2007). Blackshirt: Sir Oswald Mosley and British Fascism. Penguin. ISBN 978-0-140-25821-9.
- Kay, Alex J. (2005). Exploitation, Resettlement, Mass Murder: Political and Economic Planning for German Occupation Policy in the Soviet Union, 1940-1941. Berghahn Books. ISBN 978-0-857-45165-1.
- May, Ernest R. (2000). Strange Victory: Hitler's Conquest of France. Hill and Wang. ISBN 978-0-809-08854-6.
- Miller, Michael D.; Schulz, Andreas (2017). Gauleiter: The Regional Leaders of the Nazi Party and Their Deputies, 1925–1945. Vol. 2 (Georg Joel - Dr. Bernhard Rust). R. James Bender Publishing. ISBN 978-1-932-97032-6.
- Parkinson, F., ed. (1989). Conquering the Past: Austrian Nazism Yesterday and Today. Detroit: Wayne State University Press. ISBN 978-0-814-32055-6.
- Rees, Philip (1990). Biographical Dictionary of the Extreme Right Since 1890. Simon & Schuster. ISBN 978-0-130-89301-7.
- Wetzel, David, ed. (1996). From the Berlin Museum to the Berlin Wall: Essays on the Cultural and Political History of Modern Germany. Holtzbrinck. ISBN 978-0-275-95445-1.
