= Walter Riehl =

- Born: Walter Riehl; 8 November 1881; Wiener Neustadt
- Died: 6 September 1955 (aged 73); Vienna
- Education: Doctor of Law
- Alma mater: Vienna University
- Occupation: Lawyer
- Known for: Politician
- Title: DNSAP leader
- Term: 1919 - 1923
- Political party: Deutsche Arbeiterpartei, Deutsche Nationalsozialistische Arbeiterpartei

Dr. Walter Riehl (8 November 1881 – 6 September 1955) was an Austrian lawyer and politician who was an early exponent of Austrian National Socialism. Belonging to the wing of that ideology that favoured links between Germany and an independent Austria, he lost influence as the drive for Anschluss grew within both Austrian National Socialism and German Nazism.

== Early years ==
A native of Wiener Neustadt, Riehl joined the army as a one-year volunteer in 1900. Following his military service he enrolled in the Faculty of Law at Vienna University and, after also studying at several institutions in Germany, he graduated in 1908 with his doctorate in law. Whilst studying he was briefly active in the Social Democratic Party of Austria, where his main contribution was an attempt to influence fellow members towards the temperance movement. A devout member of the Catholic Church, he became appalled at the tendency towards Marxism that was gaining importance in the party at the time, and ultimately left before 1907 citing the dominance of Jewish members within the party. From then on anti-Semitism was to be central to Riehl's personal political creed.

== DNSAP ==
Moving to the right, Riehl was initially a disciple of conservative philosopher Othmar Spann. Despite this he joined the Deutsche Arbeiterpartei (DAP) in 1908. As a DAP member representing the middle classes he advocated a name change and a broadening of membership away from simply the working classes. Influenced by the radical racialist theories of Georg Ritter von Schönerer, Riehl took a leading role in organising the party's youth movement. Considered part of the DAP's radical wing, he argued that dictatorship was the only option in overcoming class conflict whilst also becoming noted for his expression of anti-Czech sentiments. His involvement with the party saw him lose the position he had held within the Austrian civil service and he spent time working in a lawyer's office in Germany around 1911.

Following the outbreak of the First World War he enlisted in the Landsturm before in late 1915 being recalled to the regular army, where he saw action on the Italian Front. He became deputy chairman of the DAP in March 1918 and two months later took over as leader. The party was renamed Deutsche Nationalsozialistische Arbeiterpartei (DNSAP) immediately after the break-up of the Austro-Hungarian Empire.

As leader Riehl moved the DNSAP, which had mainly been an anti-Czech party towards anti-Semitism. He sought to blame Austria's problems on the Jews and wanted them expelled from the country. He also supported profit sharing and land reform and also sought to build up the party in universities, setting up a German Academic Association of National Socialists as early as June 1919. Where the DAP had been avowedly a "class" party, Riehl sought to distance the group from any such consideration, instead tying it in to the wider Völkisch movement.

Riehl was aware from early on of the existence of the German Workers' Party in Germany itself and maintained correspondence with its early leader Anton Drexler. He was not a supporter of union with Germany but nonetheless he accepted a subservient role to Adolf Hitler at an early stage, referring to him "unseren reichsdeutschen führer" (our German Reich leader) in 1922. Certainly contact was established between the two very early and Carsten has suggested that Hitler added the epithet 'National Socialist' to his German Workers Party in imitation of Riehl's movement.

Riehl remained as leader of the DNSAP until 1923 when it split between the pro-Hitler and pro-independence factions. Initially placed on a leave of absence, supposedly for health reasons, Riehl was eventually expelled from the party as the Hitlerite wing gained the upper hand. Riehl took charge of the pro-independence Deutschsozialen Verein wing of the party with Karl Schulz leading the Hitlerite group. Riehl's party worked closely with the Greater German People's Party and in the 1927 election they presented a joint list under the name Nationale Einheitsfront. He also played a role in Hermann Hiltl's Frontkämpfervereinigung, a Pan-German militia group that was independent of the Nazis.

== Return to favour ==
Riehl's profile fell somewhat after the split as the pro-Germany wing won the lion's share of support. However Riehl would come back into favour in 1925 when he defended Otto Rothstock at his trial for the murder of Hugo Bettauer. His involvement in the trial helped him to regain prestige in the DNSAP after resigning from the leadership following the schisms of 1923. Riehl gained notoriety for his defences of right-wing leaders in a number of cases and in the aftermath of the Schattendorf Incident it was he who secured the acquittal of the accused rightist leaders.

Riehl returned to the Nazis on 26 September 1930, being admitted as member number 360.702. He returned to a prominent position within the party and used this influence to again promote his anti-Semitic agenda. In 1931 he called for castration for any Jewish man caught having sex with an Aryan girl and when elected to Vienna council the following year he made a further call for expulsion of the Jews from the area. Indeed, for Riehl anti-Semitism was the entire basis of the Nazis' appeal in Austria, along with their anti-communism.

== Later years ==
Despite his extreme views on the Jews, Riehl was more committed to constitutional methods than some of his DNSAP colleagues and he became a critic of some of the group's excesses, such that he was expelled again on 9 August 1933. He was especially critical of the leadership of Theodor Habicht and Alfred Frauenfeld, in particular the botched Coup d'état of 1934 which resulted in the murder of Engelbert Dollfuss. Advocating a more Christianity-based form of nationalism, he established the Wiener Stadtklub as an ideological discussion group in 1937, although this proved to be largely Nazi in character.

Briefly held in detention by the Gestapo after the Anschluss, he then attempted to join the NSDAP but was rejected on account of his shaky record on supporting union with Germany. He was eventually allowed to join the Nazi Party although he was never more than a rank-and-file member.

He disappeared from the public eye after this although after the Second World War he held membership of the Austrian People's Party. Riehl died in Vienna.
