= Jelmoli =

Department store in Zürich, Switzerland

Coordinates: 47.37427°N 8.537304°E

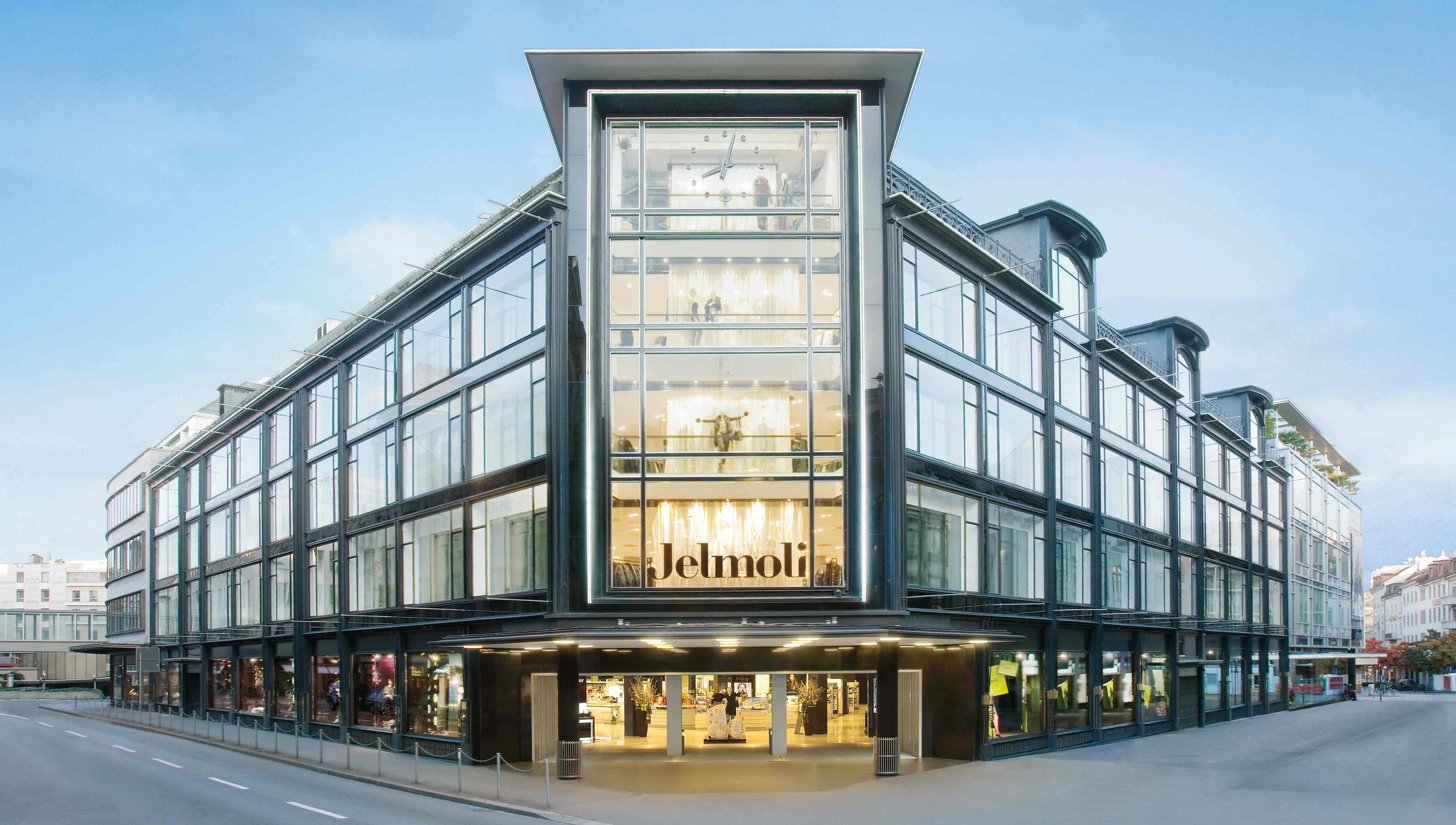
- Type: Public, AG
- Industry: retail
- Founded: (1833) (July 2006) (Jelmoli AG)
- Headquarters: Zürich, Switzerland
- Key people: Nina Müller (CEO)
- Revenue: 257 million CHF (2007)
- Number of employees: 1300 (December 2007)
- Parent: Swiss Prime Site (since 2009)
- Website: www.jelmoli.ch

Jelmoli (officially Jelmoli Ltd.) was a Swiss department store founded in 1833 by Johann Peter Jelmoli in Zürich, Switzerland. It was the oldest and largest of its kind in Switzerland. After its 190th anniversary the store was closed by the end of February 2025.

== History ==
In 1833, Italian-born merchant Johann Peter Jelmoli, settled permanently in Zürich, Switzerland, after being deployed there by his father-in-law to manage Ciolina Brothers which was a well known textile firm in Schipfe directly on the Limmat river. He brought the new concept of fixed prices where prices were posted and no price negotiation was expected. In 1834, Jelmoli added a mail-order business, and found great success.

He soon moved to larger premises near Münsterbrücke in 1837. In 1849, he separated his business from the Ciolina family, and started to operated under the name Jelmoli & Comp. Over the next decades the business steadily grew and his son, Franz Anton Jelmoli, decided to drastically expand the business. In 1896, he turned the family business in a stock corporation, and raised capital for the construction of a new department store. The mail-order business began in 1897 with the first mail order catalog as a retail store with shipping.

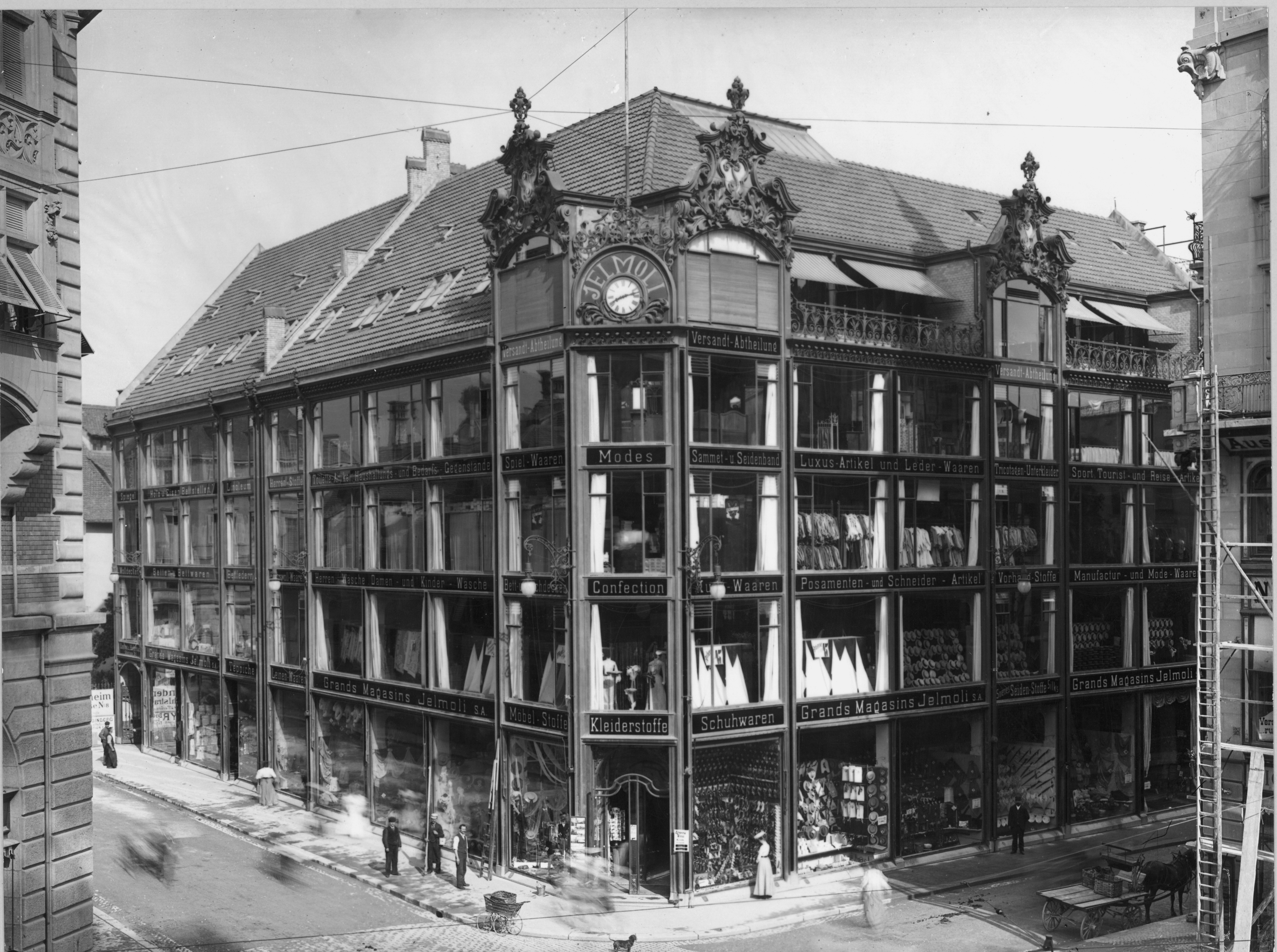
The first incarnation of Jelmoli's 'glass palace' was completed in the art nouveau style in 1903.

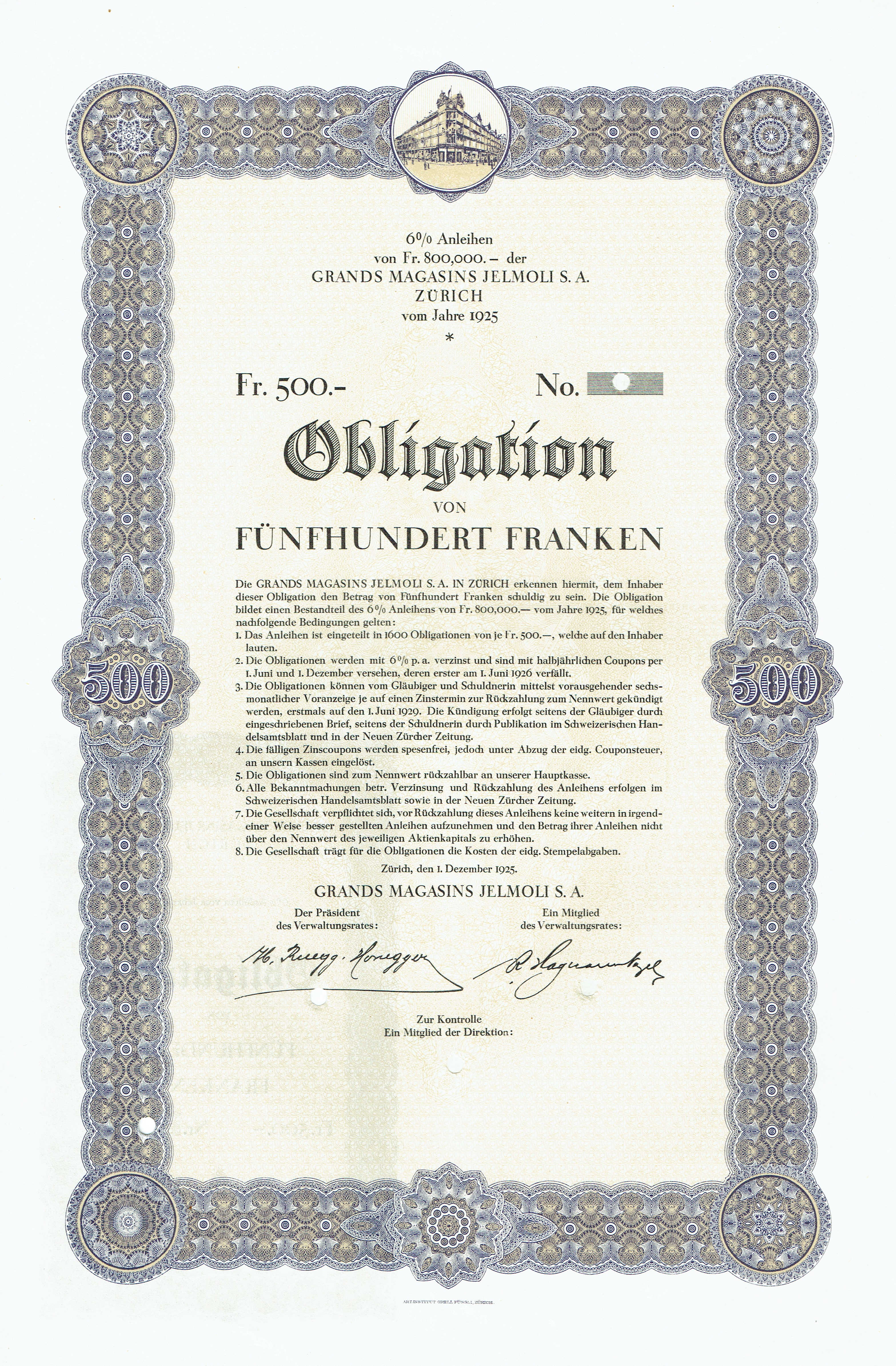
Bond of the Grands Magasins Jelmoli S. A., issued 1 December 1925

The new store was designed as a glass palace after Parisian department stores and became the new headquarters of Jelmoli. The building was completed in 1898 at the site of the former silk farms with 72 employees.

Gradually, and with major expansions in 1931–1938, 1947, and 1958–1961, grew into a glass palace with a closed courtyard. Due to the construction history, the exterior style differs significantly on two faces. Razing of adjacent properties (stone mill, vehicle fuel station) led to construction of the store's car park, and created new commercial space where, among other businesses, the Hiltl, the oldest vegetarian restaurant in Switzerland now exists.

In 1940, under pressure from anti-semitism in Switzerland, the Jewish board members of Jelmoli quit and emigrated to the United States.

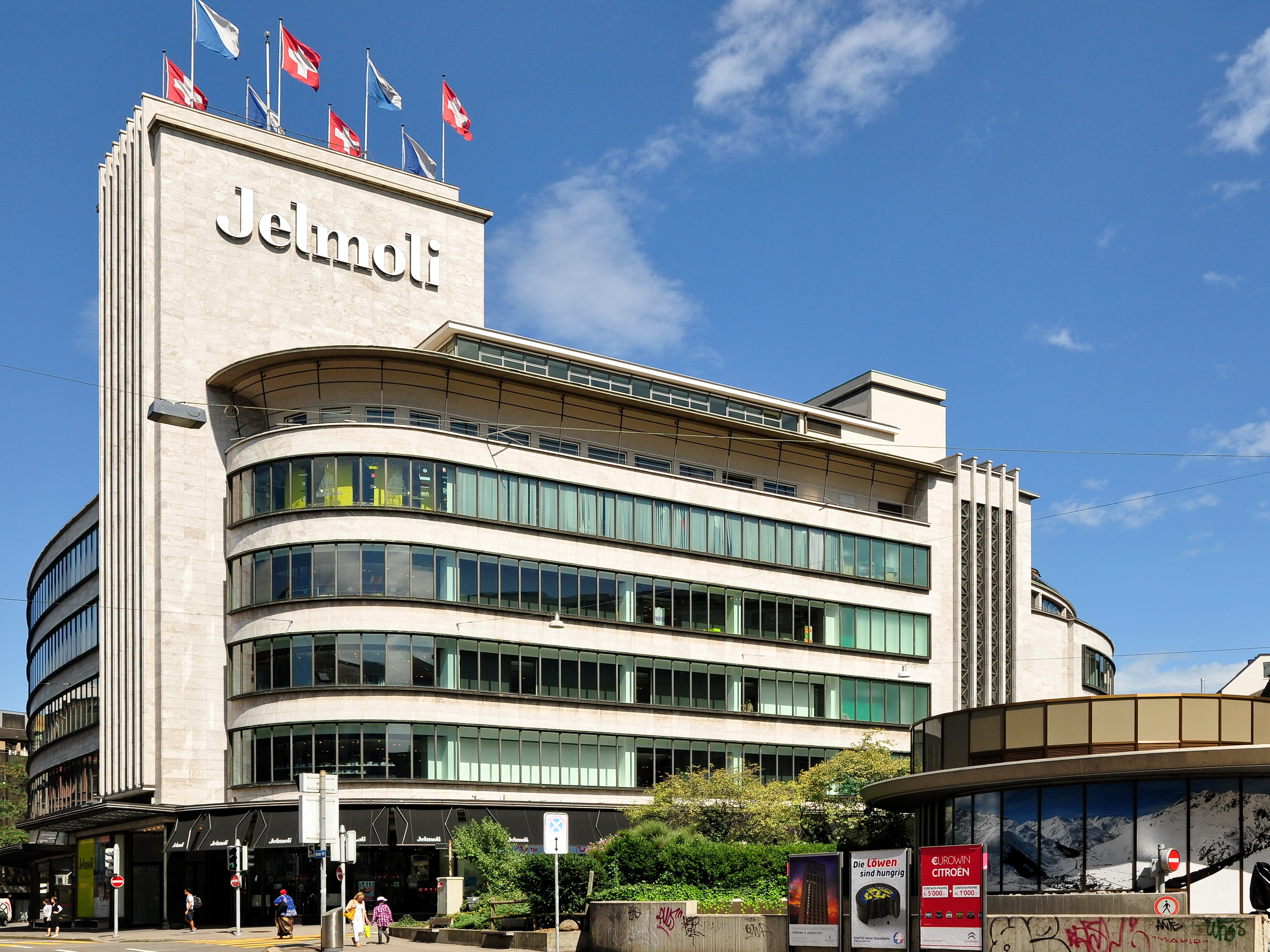
The 1938 late modernist rear extension to Jelmoli on Zürich's Uraniastrasse.

In 1952, management was reorganized to begin building a chain of stores, which opened the first store in 1954 in Oerlikon, followed by at least 50 more Jelmoli department stores throughout Switzerland. In 1963, Romandie Jelmoli expanded through the acquisition of stores in Lausanne and Au Grand Passage Geneva. In 1968, a second store in Lausanne (Sébeillon) was completed.

The diversification of the department store group began in 1972 with the construction of Jelmoli Travel, the Molino restaurant chain, and Terlinden-Jelmoli dry cleaners. Jelmoli Group reached its zenith in 1988 at 231 locations, 5200 employees and a gross revenue of 1471 million Swiss Francs.

In the 1990s, sales and profits were steadily declining in all department stores industry wide, part of a Swiss consumer spending change. As a result, in 1995–1996, Jelmoli pulled back significantly from the department store business, closing all stores except the glass palace in Zürich. Thus, the distribution centers were unnecessary, and the majority of the Jelmoli shipping was sold. Since 1997, Jelmoli brands itself as a shop-within-a-shop gallery under the slogan "The House of Brands".

== Takeover and closure ==
In 2009, Jelmoli was taken over by the Swiss real estate company Swiss Prime Site (SPS), which led to the creation of Switzerland's largest real estate firm with a then portfolio of 8 billion CHF.

In February 2023, SPS announced that it had decided to renovate the Jelmoli building, leading to a closure of the department store for good.

The closure was initially planned for the end of 2024, but was postponed by two months to the end February 2025. The store ceased retail operations on 28th February 2025.

In its place, three floors of the building would be leased to the department-store chain Manor starting in 2027, while 20,000 square meteres of space would be converted into office space.
