= German Workers' Party (Austria-Hungary) =

German Workers' Party Deutsche Arbeiterpartei in Österreich
- Abbreviation: DAP
- Notable members: Rudolf Jung; Hans Knirsch... and others: Hans Krebs; Walter Riehl; Alfred Proksch; Alois Ciller; Wilhelm Prediger; Adam Fahrner; Ferdinand Ertl; Ferdinand Seidl; Otto Kroy; Walter Gattermayer
- Founder: Ferdinand Burschofsky
- Founded: 14 November 1903; Aussig, Bohemia
- Dissolved: 5 May 1918
- Preceded by: German-Political Workers' Association for Austria
- Succeeded by: DNSAP (Austria); DNSAP (Czechoslovakia)
- Newspaper: Freie Volksstimme
- Ideology: Pan-Germanism; Austro–German nationalism Anti-Marxism; Linz Program of 1882
- Political position: Far-right
- Electoral alliance: Deutscher Nationalverband
- Colours: Black Red Gold; Blue (customary)
- Slogan: "Volkstum, Freiheit und soziale Gerechtigkeit" (Volkstum, freedom and social justice)
- Party program: Trautenau Programme (1904); Iglau Programme (1913)
- Seats in the Reichsrat (1911): 3 / 516

Election symbol

The German Workers' Party (Deutsche Arbeiterpartei, DAP) in Austria-Hungary was the predecessor of the Austrian and Czechoslovak Deutsche Nationalsozialistische Arbeiterpartei (DNSAP), founded on 14 November 1903, in Aussig (Ústí nad Labem), Bohemia. Its founder was Ferdinand Burschofsky.

The German Workers' Party sought to defend German interests in the Czech lands. Its party program was founded on Pan-Germanism, and was vehemently anti-Slavic, anti-Catholic, anti-Marxist and anti-capitalist.

In the elections for the Imperial Council in 1905 and 1911, the party obtained 3 seats. Hans Knirsch was chosen as parliamentary chairman in 1912. At the end of the First World War DAP was divided into two separate name-sake parties - the German National Socialist Workers Party in the Republic of Austria (led by Walter Riehl) and the German National Socialist Workers Party in the Czechoslovak Republic (led by Hans Knirsch).

== Election results ==
Imperial Council
Date	Votes			Seats		Position	Size
Date	No.	%	± pp	No.	±	Position	Size
1907	3,486	0.08	New	0 / 259	New	Extra-parliamentary	49th
1911	26,670	0.59	▲0.51	3 / 259	▲3	Opposition	▲35th

== See also ==
- German Workers' Party (Germany)
