= Fridolin Glass =

Austrian Nazi activist and Schutzstaffel (SS) officer (1910–1943)

Fridolin Glass, also Glaß (14 December 1910, in Lemberg – 21 February 1943, in the Soviet Union) was an Austrian Nazi activist and Schutzstaffel (SS) officer. Glass came to prominence in 1934 when he became the effective leader of the July Putsch, a failed coup attempt by the Nazis in Austria.

== Early years ==
Glass served with the Austrian Army and was highly decorated. He became a member of the Nazi Party in 1931, with the membership number 440 452. After joining the party, Glass, who held the rank of sergeant-major, attempted to build up a force of Nazis within the Austrian Army, but was expelled from the army in 1933 as a result.

== Coup d'état attempt ==
In late 1933, under direct orders of Adolf Hitler, the Austrian Nazis had established the SS Standarte 89 as a group of highly organised shock troops designed to create chaos on the streets of the country. Glass was chosen to command this new unit and given the rank of Sturmbannführer in the SS. Glass at this time enjoyed a fairly close relationship with Heinrich Himmler, who was keen to establish a strong SS presence in Austria, where the rival Sturmabteilung was strong, and felt Glass was the ideal man to aid him in this aim.

On 25 June 1934 Glass held a meeting in Zurich with Theodor Habicht, Rudolf Weydenhammer, Otto Wächter and other Austrian Nazi leaders to discuss strategy. Taking the lead, Glass outlined his plan to use SS Standarte 89 to launch an attack that would see Prime Minister Engelbert Dollfuss, President Wilhelm Miklas and the entire cabinet taken hostage, whilst the rest of the group launched assaults on Vienna's radio and telephone operations. With Glass insisting the secret Nazi networks within the army would ensure wide support from soldiers, the plot was agreed and Glass returned to Austria to initiate his ideas. In fact Glass's insistence that he had close links to members of the army general staff sympathetic to Nazism had been exaggerations. They met again on 16 July to finalise what they dubbed Operation Sommerfest and agreed a date of 24 July for the plan to happen.

Delayed until the following day after the cabinet meeting that they planned to attack was postponed, and with Miklas out of town, the plot was carried out but largely failed. Whilst they managed to capture the cabinet and kill Dollfuss, Anton Rintelen did not replace him as planned, the army did not rise up in support and in the end the rebels were forced to surrender.

Glass was arrested in the aftermath of the coup attempt but escaped custody and fled to Czechoslovakia, from where he made his way to Nazi Germany. He was allowed to live in Germany under the assumed name Karl Merkmann and worked full-time for the SS.

== Post-Anschluss ==
Following the Anschluss in 1938 Glass became a councillor in Vienna and was appointed Gaupropagandaredner and Kreisleiter. He also became owner of Unternehmens Vereinigte Chemische Fabriken Kreidl, Heller & Co, a highly profitable chemical company.

== War service and death ==
Upon the outbreak of the Second World War he joined the Luftwaffe and took part in the invasion of Poland. While there, he ordered the killings of three or four Polish civilians, including a local mayor, as a platoon commander. Glass suspected the civilians of being insurgents responsible for a recent attack on the platoon. After it was discovered that the regular Polish military was responsible, Glass was arrested by the Wehrmacht and charged with murder. However, the court-martial was soon disbanded, and Glass was later applauded for his actions by the SS.

He was later transferred to the Waffen-SS, with the rank of Untersturmführer and served on the Eastern Front as a war reporter. It was here that he was killed in action in February 1943 in Dniprodzerzhynsk (now Kamianske) in the Soviet Union. Following his death, Glass was posthumously promoted to the rank of Oberführer.
