= Johann Peter Jelmoli =

Swiss Italian businessman and merchant

Johann Jakob Jelmoli
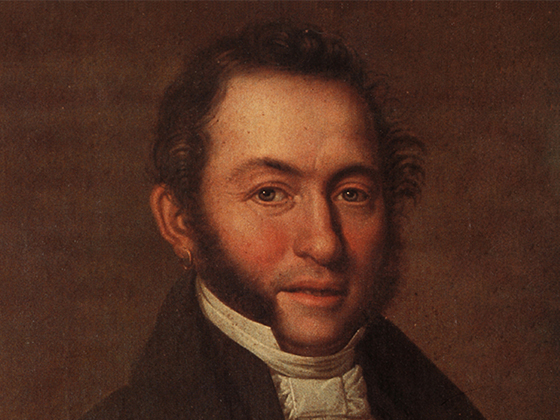
- Jelmoli c. 1840
- Born: Giovanni Pietro Guglielmoli; 1794; Toceno, Piedmont, Kingdom of Sardinia
- Died: 19 November 1860 (aged 65–66); Zurich, Switzerland
- Occupation(s): Businessman, merchant
- Years active: 1833–1860
- Known for: Founding Jelmoli
- Spouse: Anna Maria Ciolina (m. 1813)

Johann Peter Jelmoli (né Giovanni Pietro Guglielmoli; 1794 – 19 November 1860) was an Italian businessman and merchant who founded the department store Jelmoli in Zurich, Switzerland.

== Personal life ==
In 1813, Jelmoli married Anna Maria Ciolina, daughter of Giovanni Pietro Ciolina, who was a wealthy merchant who was partner in a textile firm in Mannheim, Germany. Jelmoli completed his apprenticeship with him and rose up to leading the Swiss subsidiaries of Ciolina Brothers in Switzerland. They had one son;

- Franz Andreas Jelmoli (1814–1892), married Anna Maria Christmann of Mannheim, they had five children; Philippine Ponti (née Jelmoli; 1863–1939), Philipp Jelmoli (1847–1909), Franz Anton Jelmoli (1851–1928) and Angela Jelmoli.

Jelmoli settled in Zurich in 1833, where he changed his name from Guglielmoli to the more germanized Jelmoli. He died there on 19 November 1860 aged 65.
