= Die Zeit (Prague) =

- Publisher: Sudeten German Party, NSDAP
- Founded: 1 October 1935
- Ceased publication: 1945
- Political alignment: National Socialist
- Language: German language
- Headquarters: Hybernská ul. 4, Prague II, later Dresden and Reichenberg
- City: Prague
- Sister newspapers: Rundschau, Die Zeit am Montag, Zeitspiegel

Die Zeit ('The Time') was a German language daily newspaper published in Prague, Czechoslovakia from 1935 to 1938. The newspaper was the central organ of the Sudeten German Party (SdP). The first issue came out on 1 October 1935. Die Zeit took over the role as the central party organ from the weekly Rundschau. Walter Brand was the editor-in-chief of Die Zeit.

The newspaper received funds from Germany. 250,000 Reichsmark were transferred for the launch of Die Zeit, followed by a monthly subsidy of 10,000 Reichsmarks.

Die Zeit had an illustrated supplement, Zeitspiegel ('Mirror of Time').

As of 1937/1938 SdP re-organized its party press. All small publishing companies were merged in two central publishing companies. On 1 January 1938 Die Zeit, Zeitspiegel and Rundschau came under the management of the publishing company "Pressa-Gesellschaft m. b. H., Herausgabe und Verkauf von Zeitungen und Zeitschriften", at Hybernska Street 4, Prague II. On 1 April 1938 the weekly Die Zeit am Montag ('The Time on Monday') was added to the publications issued by the same company.

The SdP shut down its Prague HQ and Die Zeit on 14 September 1938. The suspension of publishing of Die Zeit was supposedly 'temporary'.

On 4 October 1938 Die Zeit re-appeared, being published from Dresden, Germany. Once the Reichsgau Sudetenland had been established, Die Zeit became the official NSDAP daily for Sudetenland. The publishing was shifted to Reichenberg. Die Zeit was issued by R.S. Gauverlag Sudetenland G.m.b.H. between 1939 and 1945. Publication continued at least until February 1945.
