= National Association of German Workers in Bohemia =

The National Association of German Workers in Bohemia (German: Alldeutschen Arbeiterbund in Böhmen) was a union made up exclusively of ethnic Germans and of völkisch nationalist, pan-German, anti-Slavic, anti-Semitic and anti-Catholic tendencies. The union was founded in 1893 by Franko Stein with the aim of serving as the union arm of the Schönerer's movement.

Already in the early 1890s, a young mechanic named Franko Stein tried to convince Georg von Schönerer to create a trade union branch of his movement, made up mainly of corps students, merchants and peasants, to bring their struggle to the popular masses of German workers, who at that time was being hit by the nationality conflict with the Czech workers. The two men discussed this possibility several times during their private meetings at Rosenau Castle. Despite the fact that Stein tried to make Schönerer aware of the situation of the German workers, he, with his aristocratic and elitist thinking, was not very convinced of the role of the proletarian masses in his association. However, in 1893 the Social Democratic unions began to grow significantly in numbers. Alarmed by this, Schönerer became convinced that it was necessary to counterattack, which is why he would give the green light to Stein's project to establish a proletarian wing of his movement to counter the Social Democratic influence on the German masses.

The Alldeutschen Arbeiterbund was intended both to "racially conscientize" the German working class and organize it against the Czech and Jewish worker, and to repel revolutionary, internationalist, and leftist tendencies in the proletarian movement. Stein tried to convince the workers to adopt the Bismarckian social program as an antidote to revolutionary socialism, anarchism and Marxism. Stein constantly investigated against the lack of economic and political democracy in Austria but at the same time condemned the Social Democratic doctrines of proletarian solidarity, class war, and revolution. He traveled through Bohemia, Moravia, Silesia, and the Alpine provinces talking to groups of workers and explaining Schönerer's views and seeking to warn that Slavic immigration was endangering German land, culture, and jobs. In 1904 Stein would go on to establish and publish Der Hammer, a proletarian version of Wolf's Ostdeutsche Rundschau.

A police report in Vienna from 1893 noted that Stein was trying to racially radicalize workers and spread the word of Bismarck and Schönerer, but they dismissed him and noted how small his following was. However, in 1897, with the Badeni crisis and the rise of Schönerer that it provoked, working-class nationalism grew remarkably and with it the number of members of the Alldeutschen Arbeiterbund. On 14 May 1899, some 300 delegates representing at least 4,000 or more workers from all sectors met in Eger. The reason for the conference was to unite all the German unions into a single union strong enough to outperform the Czech competition. Stein will be one of the main participants. At this conference, the participants swore allegiance, recognized Schönerer as "führer" and adopted the Linz program as a basis. An agreement was reached at the conference on a 25-point programme, a direct predecessor of the famous NSDAP programme, which called for improved working conditions, various social rights and that Czechs be barred from taking jobs. Five months after the Eger Congress, in October, the Alldeutschen Arbeiterbund merged with other unions to establish the Bund Deutscher Arbeiter Germania under the leadership of Franko Stein.

== See also ==
- National syndicalism
