= Býkov-Láryšov =

- Municipality
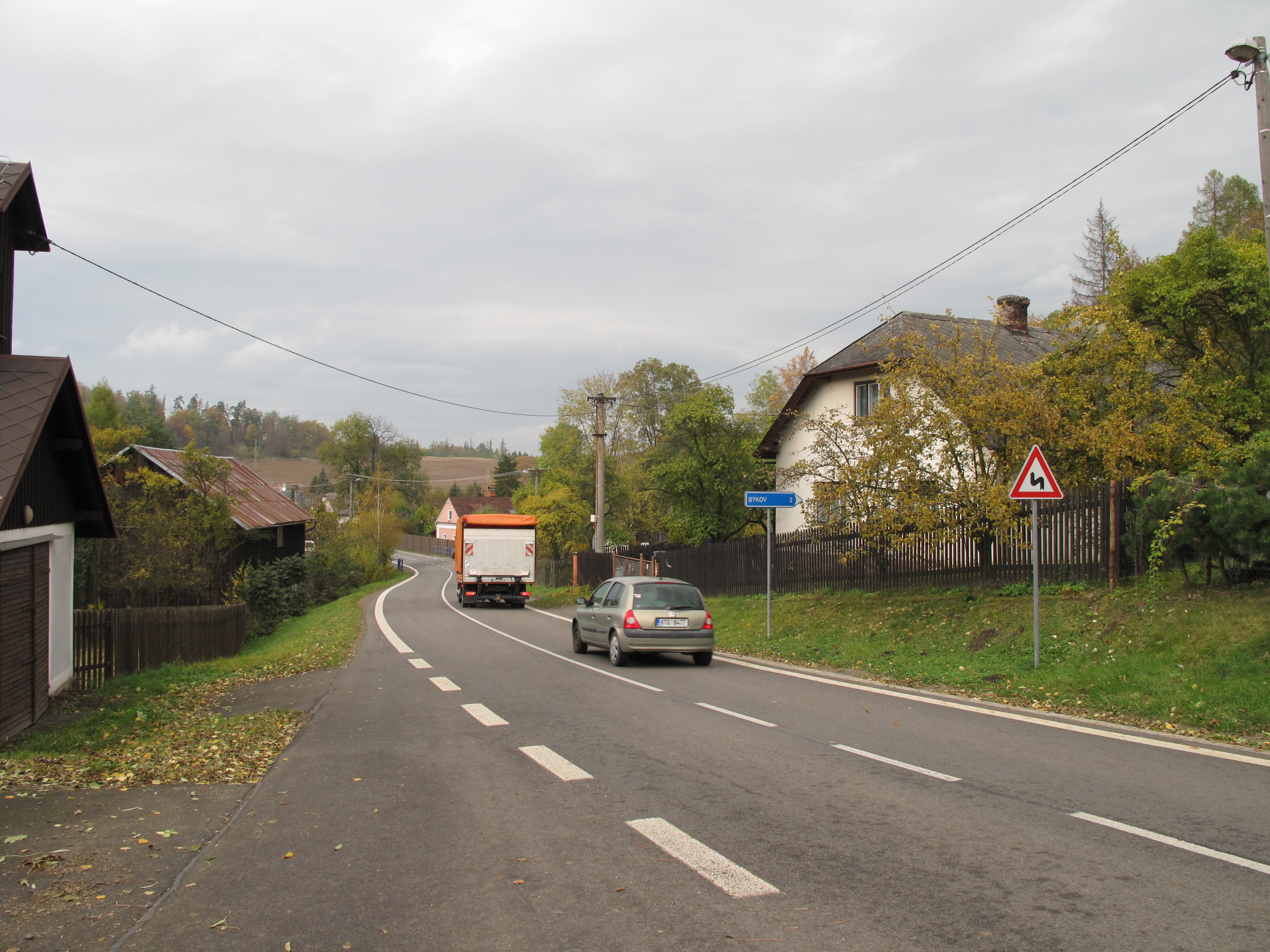
- Main road in Láryšov

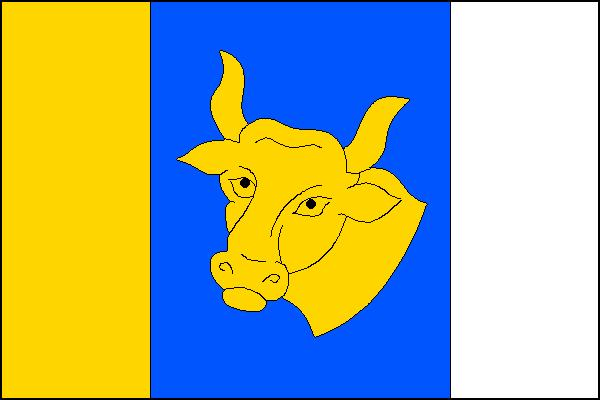
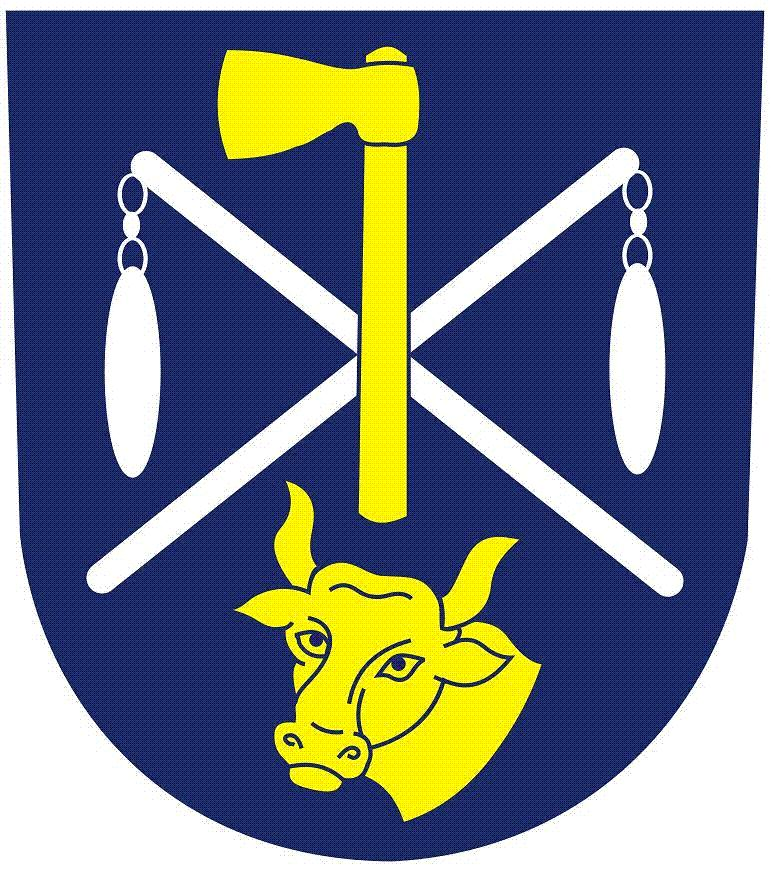
- Flag Coat of arms

- Location in the Czech Republic
- Coordinates: 50°3′9″N 17°41′22″E
- Country: Czech Republic
- Region: Moravian-Silesian
- District: Bruntál
- First mentioned: 1238

Area
  - Total: 9.12 km^{2} (3.52 sq mi)
- Elevation: 415 m (1,362 ft)

Population (2026-01-01)
  - Total: 169
  - Density: 18.5/km^{2} (48.0/sq mi)
- Time zone: UTC+1 (CET)
  - Summer (DST): UTC+2 (CEST)
- Postal code: 794 01
- Website: www.bykov-larysov.cz

Býkov-Láryšov (German: Pickau-Larischau) is a municipality in Bruntál District in the Moravian-Silesian Region of the Czech Republic. It has about 200 inhabitants.

== Administrative division ==
Býkov-Láryšov consists of two municipal parts (in brackets population according to the 2021 census):

- Býkov (130)
- Láryšov (37)

== Demographics ==
Historical population
Year	Pop.	±%
1869	413	—
1880	430	+4.1%
1890	425	−1.2%
1900	406	−4.5%
1910	381	−6.2%
1921	391	+2.6%
1930	366	−6.4%
1950	240	−34.4%
1961	253	+5.4%
1970	283	+11.9%
1980	215	−24.0%
1991	161	−25.1%
2001	158	−1.9%
2011	164	+3.8%
2021	167	+1.8%
Source: Censuses

== Notable people ==
- Alfred Proksch (1891–1981), Austrian Nazi politician
