= Hiltl =

Hiltl is a surname. Notable people with the surname include:

- Eleonora Hiltl (1905–1979), Austrian politician
- Henri Hiltl (1910–1982), Austrian-born French footballer
- Hermann Hiltl (1872–1930), Austrian army officer and fascist
- Hiltl Restaurant, Switzerland
