= Třebařov =

- Municipality
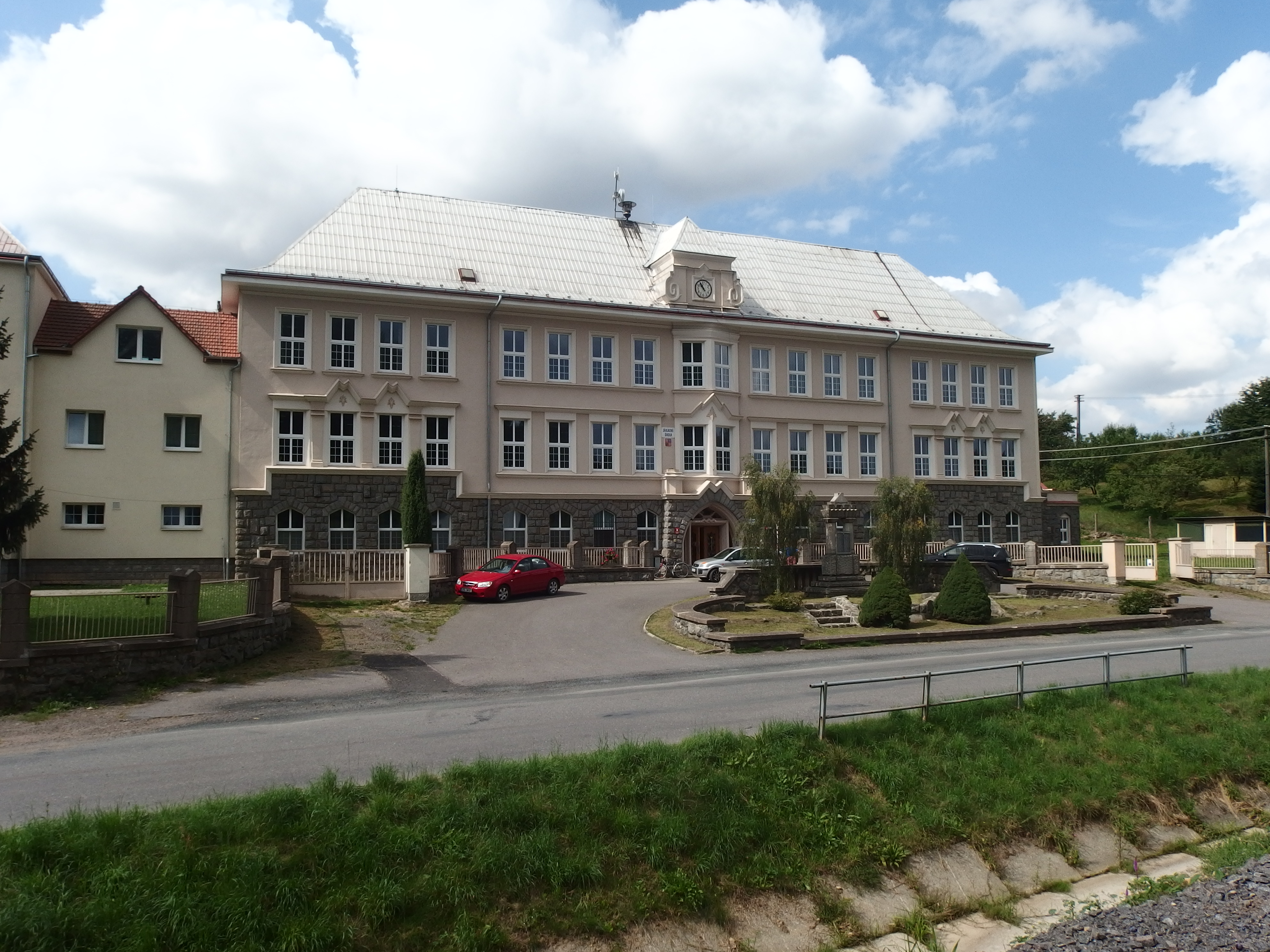
- Primary school

- Flag Coat of arms

- Location in the Czech Republic
- Coordinates: 49°49′47″N 16°42′9″E
- Country: Czech Republic
- Region: Pardubice
- District: Svitavy
- First mentioned: 1267

Area
  - Total: 15.62 km^{2} (6.03 sq mi)
- Elevation: 360 m (1,180 ft)

Population (2026-01-01)
  - Total: 904
  - Density: 57.9/km^{2} (150/sq mi)
- Time zone: UTC+1 (CET)
  - Summer (DST): UTC+2 (CEST)
- Postal code: 569 33
- Website: www.trebarov.cz

Třebařov (Czech pronunciation: [ˈtr̝̊ɛbar̝of]; German: Triebendorf) is a municipality and village in Svitavy District in the Pardubice Region of the Czech Republic. It has about 900 inhabitants.

Třebařov lies approximately 19 kilometres (12 mi) north-east of Svitavy, 70 km (43 mi) east of Pardubice, and 166 km (103 mi) east of Prague.

== Demographics ==
Historical population
Year	Pop.	±%
1869	2,266	—
1880	2,098	−7.4%
1890	2,104	+0.3%
1900	2,020	−4.0%
1910	2,103	+4.1%
1921	1,898	−9.7%
1930	1,823	−4.0%
1950	1,103	−39.5%
1961	1,191	+8.0%
1970	1,142	−4.1%
1980	1,101	−3.6%
1991	957	−13.1%
2001	1,006	+5.1%
2011	874	−13.1%
2021	863	−1.3%
Source: Censuses

== Notable people ==
- Hans Knirsch (1877–1933), Austro-German politician
- Henry Kučera (1925–2010), linguist and pioneer of computer linguistics
