= Alfred Proksch (politician) =

German politician (1891–1981)

Gauleiter of Upper Austria
- In office 26 August 1926 – 9 June 1927

Deputy Landesleiter of Austria
- In office 1928 – 5 June 1931

Landesleiter of Austria
- In office 6 June 1931 – 23 June 1933

Deputy Landesleiter of Austria
- In office 24 June 1933 – July 1934

Trustee of Labour Austria
- In office 15 June 1938 – 21 October 1940

Trustee of Labour Vienna and Lower Austria
- In office 21 October 1940 – May 1945

Personal details
- Born: Alfred Proksch; 8 March 1891 Larischau, Moravia, Austria-Hungary
- Died: 3 January 1981 (aged 89) Vienna, Austria
- Citizenship: Austrian, German (after 1935)
- Party: Deutsche Arbeiterpartei, Deutsche Nationalsozialistische Arbeiterpartei, Nazi Party
- Occupation: Railway engineer
- Known for: Politician and administrator

Alfred Proksch (8 March 1891 – 3 January 1981) was an Austrian Nazi Party official who briefly served as the leader of the Nazi Party in Austria. He emigrated to Nazi Germany in 1934 but after the Anschluss returned to Nazi Austria as a Trustee of Labour from 1938 to 1945.

== Life ==
German Moravian Proksch enrolled in the Kaiser Infantry Regiment No. 1 of the Austro-Hungarian Army in 1910 and then the Railway Academy in Linz in 1912 and took a job with the government railways. He returned to the army in 1914 with the Infantry Regiment No. 91 and saw action during the First World War in Poland and Russia. He first became involved in politics in 1912 when he joined the German Workers' Party and worked on behalf of the party in Silesia and Moravia.

After his war service, Proksch settled in Austria, which was now much smaller, and returned to politics by rejoining the renamed Austrian Nazi Party. Proksch met Adolf Hitler as early as 1919 and became a loyal follower from then on. Proksch launched the Nazis in Linz, Upper Austria, the same year. He also founded both the party newspaper Linzer Volksstimme (1923) and the NSP-Verlag publishing house (1926). In 1922, Proksch began to team up with the Passau National Socialists to fight against leftists in Linz. Later, he was a featured speaker in Passau and other towns in Lower Bavaria. He also served on the Linz City Council as the chairman of the Nazi Party from July 1923 to January 1932.

On 29 August 1926, Hitler appointed Proksch Gauleiter for Upper Austria, and he served in that post until June 1927. In 1928, he was made Deputy Landesleiter (State Leader) for all of Austria. On 6 June 1931, he was promoted to Landesleiter and held that post until 23 June 1933 although most power rested with Hitler's personal representative, the German Theodor Habicht. However, Proksch had a strong influence over finances and was credited with eliminating the 30,000 schillings of debt that the party had.

Proksch fled to Germany on 24 June 1933 after the banning of the Nazi Party in Austria. He settled in Munich, where he was made Deputy to Habicht, who continued to be responsible for Austrian policy. Proksch returned to Austria in time to take part in the coup attempt that resulted in the killing of Chancellor Engelbert Dollfuss in 1934. In July 1934, Proksch was granted the title of honorary Gauleiter. Returning to Germany, he acquired German citizenship in 1935. In March 1936, he was elected to the Reichstag for electoral constituency 34 (Hamburg) and in April 1938, he switched to representing constituency 8 (Liegnitz).

Given Proksch's position as a Hitler loyalist, his profile was raised after the Anschluss. Joining the Sturmabteilung (SA) as an SA-Gruppenführer in June 1938, he was promoted to SA-Obergruppenführer on 20 April 1943. On 15 June 1938, he was appointed as the Trustee of Labour for the economic area of all of Austria. After the area was subdivided, he became the Reich Trustee of Labour for Vienna and Lower Austria on 21 October 1940, also serving as President of the Labour Office in Vienna until May 1945. Arrested in May 1945, he was interned, tried by the People's Court in Vienna and sentenced to four years of hard labour. After his release, he worked as a labourer until 1956.
