= Franko Stein =

Austrian politician (1869-1943)

Franko Stein, also Franz Stein (1 June 1869 – 17 July 1943) was an Austrian journalist, politician, activist, and national syndicalist of German ethnicity who lived and worked in the Austro-Hungarian Empire and later in Czechoslovakia. Very close to Georg von Schönerer, he led the union wing of his movement. He was also a member of the Bohemian Diet between 1899 and 1908 and of the Reichsrat between 1901 and 1907.

== Life ==
Franko Stein was born in Vienna on 11 June 1869, the son of a factory worker. He trained as a mechanic and passed his journeyman exams. From 1888, at the age of 19, he was active in Georg von Schönerer's pan-German movement and tried to establish pan-German workers' organizations, through which he intended to bring Schönerer's cause to the working masses from which he came. In 1893, he founded the National Association of German Workers in Bohemia, which from 1899 was called the German Workers' Association of Germany. Stein further established a press organ for this national syndicalist organization called Der Hammer, which began publishing in 1895. From 1897 he worked as a journalist in Eger, where he published the Hammer yearbook in 1898–1938. In 1899, he convened the first national congress of German workers in Eger and pushed for the adoption of a twenty-five-point program for revolutionary action.

With the turn of the century, he also became involved in regional politics. In the elections of 1899, he was elected to the Bohemian Diet in the city curia (Vrchlabí constituency). He defended the mandate for the same district in the regular elections of 1901. Politically, he belonged to the Alldeutschen Vereinigung. In the 1901 election, he was also elected to the Reichsrat, for the Eger district. In the years 1902–1906, he was also a member of the so-called delegations (parliamentary group for negotiations on common issues of both parts of Austria-Hungary).

When the schism between Schönerer and Wolf occurred in 1903, after which Wolf and his supporters established the All-German Free Party, Stein was one of the few who remained loyal to Schönerer. After the schism, Schönerer's movement collapsed, which is why neither he nor Stein were reelected in 1907.

In 1914–1917 he worked for the German national newspaper Deutsche Presse, published in Vienna. In the interwar period, he promoted the Schönerer legacy and the ideas of Greater Germany. He headed the Society of the Last Schönererians, founded in 1922 after Schönerer's death. After the establishment of the Social Christian regime, he was repeatedly arrested. After the Anschluss Stein joined the NSDAP, he became politically active once more and ran for the Reichstag in the 1938 elections, but failed to obtain a seat. During the Third Reich, he received numerous awards and received a regular state pension. In 1942 he participated in the organization of an exhibition on Georg von Schönerer held in Vienna. Franko Stein died on 17 July 1943. His funeral was held at Hietzing Cemetery, where he was buried.

== See also ==
- National syndicalism
