= Hans Knirsch =

Austro-German activist

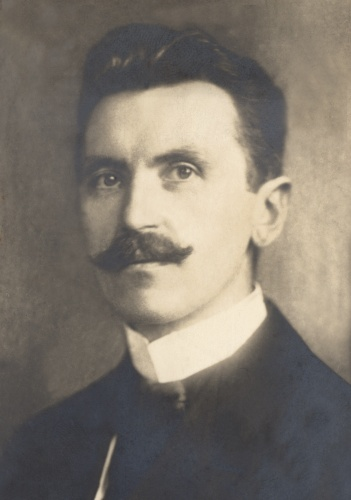
- Born: 14 September 1877; Třebařov
- Died: 6 December 1933 (aged 56); Duchcov
- Occupation: Politician

Hans Knirsch (14 September 1877 in Třebařov – 6 December 1933 in Duchcov) was an Austro-German activist from Moravia for Austrian Nazism. After the breakup of the Austro-Hungarian Empire, he led the original party in Bohemia, called the German National Socialist Workers' Party. Together with Rudolf Jung and Hans Krebs, he was one of the original core that remained in the Nazi Party after 1933.

== Biography ==
Hans Knirsch became a Geschäftsführer, or managing leader, of the Mährisch-Trübauer Verband in 1901. In that capacity he published an appeal which extolled the political unification of all Germans into one state, referring to it as der alte Sehnsuchstraum der deutschen Demokraten ("the old nostalgic dream of the German democrats").

Active in several party congresses, before World War I he attempted to get the DAP to add the words "National Socialist" to their name. The effort failed, as the proposed name was felt to be too reminiscent of the Czech National Social Party Following his arrest for the failed Beer Hall Putsch, Hitler went on a hunger strike. It was Hans Knirsch who talked Hitler out of his depression and convinced him to resume eating.

== Writings of Knirsch ==
- Aus der Geschichte der deutschen nationalsozialistischen Arbeiterbewegung Altösterreichs und der Tschechoslowakei, (Aussig, 1932).
- Die Stellung der Deutschen zum tschechischen Staat. Referat, erstattet am 1. Gesamtparteitag der deutschen nationalsozialistischen Arbeiterpartei Dux, Buchdruckerei "Gutenberg" 1919
