= Hermann Hiltl =

Austro-Hungarian Army officer

- Born: 16 June 1872; Olomouc, Moravia, Austria-Hungary
- Died: 15 August 1930 (aged 58); Bad Hall, Austria
- Citizenship: Austrian
- Education: Wiener Neustadt military academy
- Occupation: Army officer
- Known for: Militia leader
- Title: Colonel
- Political party: None

Hermann Hiltl, also Hermann Ritter von Hiltl (16 June 1872 – 15 August 1930) was an Austrian army officer who became leader of his own right wing militia, the Frontkämpfervereinigung (Front Fighters' Union), after the First World War. He embraced both fascism and Pan-Germanism without fully committing to Nazism.

== Military career ==
A career soldier, Hiltl attended the military academy at Wiener Neustadt before being commissioned to Infantry Regiment No. 33. He also served as a tutor at Vienna Infantry Cadet School. He served for the entirety of the First World War, initially in Serbia, then Italy, before a return to Serbia and finally South Tyrol where he was captured and spent time in an Italian prisoner-of-war camp. By the end of the war Hiltl had risen to the rank of colonel.

== Frontkämpfervereinigung ==
After his release he formed his own 'Battalion Hiltl' as a force against growing radicalism in Austria and he soon reorganised this group as the Bund für Ordnung und Wirtschaftsschutz. This latter group soon gave way to the Frontkämpfervereinigung, an organisation that served a similar purpose to the Der Stahlhelm in Germany i.e. a rallying point for militant nationalist rightists opposed to the growth of socialism and communism. This group however called for a unification of the German volk and blamed the Jews on preventing this unity. Hiltl was personally noted for his anti-Semitism and when speaking to a March 1921 conference of the Antisemitenbund he called for Jews in Austria to be stripped of their citizenship, blaming them for the collapse of the Habsburg Empire.

On 30 January 1927, a small number of armed members of the Frontkämpfervereinigung were involved in a confrontation with a much larger group of unarmed members of the left-wing Republikanischer Schutzbund. The Frontkämpfervereinigung activists opened fire and killed an adult and a six-year-old boy. When they were found not guilty on grounds of self-defence by a jury, the socialists organised a general strike which led to the July Revolt of 1927. Following this, the previously shared leadership was done away with, and Hiltl became the sole leader of the movement in September 1927. By this time, he had become a supporter of Italian fascism and under his leadership the Frontkämpfervereinigung abandoned any pretensions of being pan-nationalist and instead embraced fascism fully. The group operated alongside the Heimwehr, although it had a sometimes troublesome relationship with that movement, due to Hiltl's support for union with Germany. The group also had a youth wing, the Jungfrontkämpfervereinigung, of which a youthful Adolf Eichmann was a member.

== Relationship with Nazism ==
Hiltl's support for union with Germany brought him into contact with the Nazi Party, although he was never a member, as he hated party politics. Nonetheless a number of leading Nazis, including Alfred Frauenfeld, passed through his movement, and he was guest of honour at the Nazi Party conference in 1929. It became a moot point with his death in 1930, although most of the Frontkämpfervereinigung ended up being absorbed by Austria's Nazis.
