= Austrian Nazism =

Far-right political movement in Austria

German National Socialist Workers' Party Deutsche Nationalsozialistische Arbeiterpartei
- Abbreviation: DNSAP
- Landesinspekteur: Theodor Habicht
- Landesleiter: Hermann Neubacher; Josef Leopold
- Founders: Alfred Proksch... and others: Franko Stein; Ludwig Vogel; Hans Knirsch; Rudolf Jung; Hans Krebs; Walter Riehl
- Founded: 5 May 1918; 108 years ago
- Banned: 19 June 1933; 93 years ago
- Preceded by: German Workers' Party
- Paramilitary wings: Austrian Legion
- Membership: approx. 34,000 (1923 est.); approx. 147,000 (1938 est.)
- Ideology: Nazism: Pan-Germanism; Austro–German nationalism; Anti-Marxism; Volksgemeinschaft
- Political position: Far-right
- Electoral alliance: Christian National Congregation (1922)
- Colours: Brown

Party flag

Austrian Nazism or Austrian National Socialism was a pan-German movement that was formed at the beginning of the 20th century. The movement took a concrete form on 15 November 1903 when the German Worker's Party (DAP) was established in Austria with its secretariat stationed in the town of Aussig (now Ústí nad Labem in the Czech Republic). It was suppressed under the rule of Engelbert Dollfuss (1932–34), with its political organization, the DNSAP ("German National Socialist Workers' Party"; German: Deutsche Nationalsozialistische Arbeiterpartei) banned in early 1933, but was revived and made part of the German Nazi Party after the German annexation of Austria in 1938.

== Origins ==
Franko Stein from Eger (now Cheb, Czech Republic) and an apprentice bookbinder Ludwig Vogel from Brüx (now Most, Czech Republic), organised the Deutschnationaler Arbeiterbund (German National Workers' League) in 1893. It was a collection of labourers, apprentices, and trade unionists from the railroads, mines, and textile industries, who upheld nationalism as a result of their conflicts with the non-German-speaking portions of the workforce, especially in the railway systems. In 1899, Stein was able to convene a workers' congress in Eger and promulgated a 25-point program.

Another convention was called in April 1902, under the title of "German-Political Workers' Association for Austria" (German: Deutschpolitischer Arbeiterverein für Österreich), in Saaz. In Aussig, on 15 November 1903, they reorganized under the name of the "German Workers' Party in Austria" (German: Deutsche Arbeiterpartei in Österreich). At further party congresses, Hans Knirsch proposed to call themselves the "Nationalsozialistische" (National-Socialist) or "Deutsch-Soziale" (German-social) Workers' Party. The Bohemian groups blocked the proposal, who did not want to copy the name of the Czech National Social Party. An early member of this group is Ferdinand Burschowsky, a printer from Hohenstadt (Moravia), who was active in writing and publishing.

== DNSAP ==
At a party congress in Vienna in May 1918, the DAP changed its name to the Deutsche Nationalsozialistische Arbeiterpartei (DNSAP). It produced a National Socialist Program, which is thought to have influenced the later German Nazi manifesto. From 1920, the swastika was added as the party symbol. Before 1920, it consisted of a hammer, oak leaves and a quill.

The Austrian DNSAP split into several factions in 1923 and again in 1926, the Deutschsozialer Verein (German-Social Association) led by Dr. Walter Riehl, the Schulz-Gruppe, NSDAP-Hitlerbewegung, and other splinter groups. After 1930, most former DNSAP members became supporters of the German NSDAP led by Austrian-born Adolf Hitler and were one of the chief elements leading the pro-Nazi coup in 1938 that brought about the Anschluss of Austria with Germany.

According to fascism scholar Stanley G. Payne, if elections had been held in 1933, the DNSAP might have mustered about 25% of the votes. Contemporary Time magazine analysts suggested a higher support of 50%, with a 75% approval rate in the Tyrol region bordering Nazi Germany.

Leaders of the party, who were dubbed Landesleiter due to the recognition of Hitler as overall Führer, included Alfred Proksch (1931–33), Hermann Neubacher (1935) and Josef Leopold (1936–38), although real power frequently lay with Theodor Habicht, a German sent by Hitler to oversee Nazi activity in Austria.

== Election results ==
National Council
| Date | Votes | | | Seats | | Position | Size |
| Date | No. | % | ± pp | No. | ± | Position | Size |
|---|---|---|---|---|---|---|---|
| 1919 | 23,334 | 0.78 | n/a | 0 / 170 | n/a | Extra-parliamentary | 16th |
| 1920 | n/a | n/a | n/a | 0 / 183 | ±0 | Extra-parliamentary | n/a |
| 1923 | did not run | | | | | | |
| 1927 | 26,991 | 0.74 | n/a | 0 / 165 | n/a | Extra-parliamentary | 5th (Note: Völkisch-Sozialer Block, joint list of NSDAP–Hitler movement and Hans Kipper's "League of the Free". In one Lower Austrian constituency, the NSDAP ran separately, receiving 779 votes. Riehl and Schulz groups ran on the Unity List with Christian Social Party and Greater German People's Party, but also won no seat.) |
| 1930 | 111,627 | 3.03 | + 2.3 | 0 / 165 | ±0 | Extra-parliamentary | 5th (Note: Only NSDAP–Hitler movement. The Schulz group ran as part of the National Economy Bloc with Greater German People's Party and Landbund, but also won no seat.) |

== See also ==
- Nazi Party
- Austrian SS
- Austrofascism
- Austria within Nazi Germany
- Timeline of the Weimar Republic
- German Workers' Party (Austria-Hungary)
