= German National Socialist Workers' Party (Czechoslovakia) =

German National Socialist Workers' Party Deutsche Nationalsozialistische Arbeiterpartei
- Leader: Hans Knirsch
- Founded: November 1919
- Dissolved: 11 December 1933
- Preceded by: German Workers' Party
- Merged into: Sudeten German Party
- Headquarters: Dux, Czechoslovakia
- Paramilitary wing: Volkssport
- Trade union: German Socialist Miners' Union
- Membership: 61,000 (May 1932 est.)
- Ideology: Nazism: Pan-Germanism; German nationalism; Anti-Marxism; Volksgemeinschaft; Negativism
- Political position: Far-right

The German National Socialist Workers' Party (German: Deutsche Nationalsozialistische Arbeiterpartei, DNSAP, Czech: Německá národně socialistická strana dělnická) was a Nazi party of Germans in Czechoslovakia, successor of the German Workers' Party (DAP) from Austria-Hungary. It was founded in November 1919 in Duchcov (German: Dux). The most crucial party activists were Hans Knirsch, Hans Krebs, Adam Fahrner, Rudolf Jung and Josef Patzel. In May 1932, it had 1,024 local chapters with 61,000 members.

Unlike its sister party in Austria, which only played a marginal role in Austrian politics, the Czechoslovak branch attracted a considerable number of votes because of the large Sudeten German minority in Czechoslovakia. In elections, it worked together with the Deutsche Nationalpartei (DNP). The party advocated cultural and territorial autonomy and anti-clericalism. It also showed antisemitic tendencies. It organized fascist militia Volkssport. In October 1933, the Czechoslovak government banned it for its anti-state activities. It was officially dissolved on 11 November 1933. DNSAP was succeeded by the Sudeten German Party.

== Election results ==
Chamber of Deputies
Date	Votes			Seats		Position	Size
Date	No.	%	± pp	No.	±	Position	Size
1920	328,735	5.30	New	15 / 281	New	Extra-parliamentary	7th
1925	168,354	2.37	▼2.93	7 / 300	▼8	Opposition	▼13th
1929	204,110	2.76	▲0.39	8 / 300	▲1	Opposition	13th

Senate
Date	Votes			Seats		Position	Size
Date	No.	%	± pp	No.	±	Position	Size
1920	300,287	5.75	New	8 / 80	New	Extra-parliamentary	7th
1925	139,945	2.30	▼3.45	3 / 76	▼5	Opposition	▼13th
1929	171,181	2.65	▲0.35	4 / 76	▲1	Opposition	13th
