= Volkssport =

Czechoslovak paramilitary

Volkssport is the German word for "People's Sport", and synonymous with Breitensport, defined as "sporting activities without the goal to compete". Volkssport consists today of Hiking, Swimming, Cycling and Skiing.

In the USA, the American Volkssport Association AVA is the national chapter of the IVV. The British Walking Federation represents IVV in the UK.

Many of the modern Volkssport clubs are organised in the International People's Sports Federation - IVV. The term "Volkssport" does not denote closeness to Nazi ideology. As Volkssport at least since the end of WW1 has a strong international component, Neo-Nazis in fact are using other terms for their "sporting" activities, like Wehrsport (cf. Wehrsportgruppe Hoffmann).

== Nazi usage ==
Emblem of Volkssport, which is an upside-down SA emblem

The Volkssport-Verband (German Verband Volkssport, Nazionalsozialistischer Verband für Wandern, Radfahren, Spiel und Sport aller Art) was the paramilitary wing of the German National Socialist Workers' Party (DNSAP) in Czechoslovakia between 1929 and 1932, later operating illegally.

It was founded on May 15, 1929 on the example of the Sturmabteilung by Hans Krebs and Paul Illing under the guise of a sporting organization.

It was banned on 22 February 1932 by Czechoslovak authorities.
