= Theodor Habicht =

German Nazi politician (1898–1944)

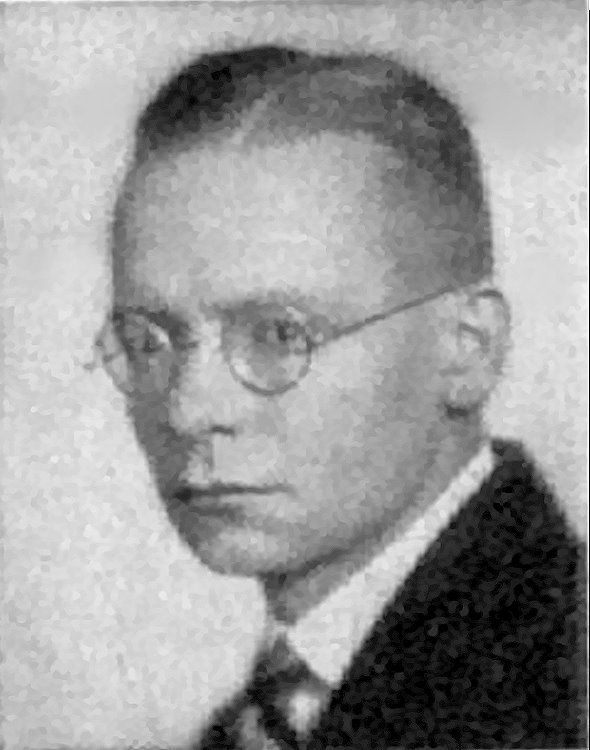
- Habicht in 1933

Landesinspekteur of Austria
- In office 20 August 1932 – 26 June 1934

Oberbürgermeister of Wittenberg
- In office 10 February 1937 – 30 September 1939

Under Secretary of State German Foreign Ministry
- In office 16 November 1939 – September 1940

Personal details
- Born: Theodor Habicht; 4 April 1898 Wiesbaden, German Empire
- Died: 31 January 1944 (aged 45) Nevel, Russian SFSR, Soviet Union
- Cause of death: Killed in action
- Citizenship: German
- Party: Nazi Party
- Known for: Nazi official

Military service
- Allegiance: German Empire (1915-1918); Weimar Republic (1919); Nazi Germany (from 1940)
- Branch/service: Imperial German Army; Army (Wehrmacht)
- Years of service: 1915–1919; 1940–1944
- Rank: Battalion Commander, Major (posthumously)
- Battles/wars: World War I, World War II

Theodor Habicht (4 April 1898 – 31 January 1944) was a leading political figure in Nazi Germany. He played a leading role in the Austrian Nazi Party. During World War II, he was involved in the administration of Nazi-occupied Norway until his dismissal by Adolf Hitler. He later served in the Wehrmacht and was killed in action on the Eastern Front at Nevel in 1944.

== Early years ==
Born in Wiesbaden and educated in his hometown and Berlin, he volunteered for the German Imperial Army in 1915, serving on the Western Front and at Isonzo in Italy. Briefly involved with communism after his 1919 demobilization, he soon took part in skirmishes against the Spartacist League before settling into various low-level white-collar jobs.

== Nazi leader ==
Habicht joined the Nazi Party in July 1926 and established a number of local journals for the group. In April 1927 he became Deputy Ortsgruppenleiter (Local Group Leader) in Wiesbaden. He soon moved up to Ortsgruppenleiter and from 20 May 1928 was the leader of the Nazis on the Wiesbaden City Council. In 1930, Habicht was elected to the Provincial Landtag of Hessen-Nassau. At the July 1932 parliamentary election and the next two elections, he was elected to the Reichstag from the Nazi Party electoral list. From the November 1933 election forward, he represented electoral constituency 19 (Hesse-Nassau) and he was reelected at each subsequent election through 1938.

Under orders from Adolf Hitler, he was sent to Austria in 1931 to oversee the reorganization of the Austrian Nazi Party. Later given the title Landesinspekteur, Habicht was the effective leader of the Austrian Nazis although titualar leadership rested with Landesleiter Alfred Proksch. Under Habicht, the Nazis experienced growth, mostly at the expense of the Heimwehr, many of whose members switched over to Nazism. Initially, Austrian Chancellor Engelbert Dollfuß attempted a conciliation, notably offering Habicht two Nazi cabinet seats, before trying to get Fascist Italy to exert pressure on Hitler to restrain Habicht's anti-government activities.

Habicht was deported in March 1933 after the Austrian government finally decided to ban the Nazi Party outright. In response, Habicht set up a leadership-in-exile in Munich that directed a campaign of terror against the Dollfuß regime and culminated in failed coup attempt and the murder of Dollfuß in July 1934 under the command of Austrian SS leader Fridolin Glass. An unpopular figure with many of the Austrians, he was excluded from the country after the failure, as Hitler placed the blame on Habicht, who had been responsible for determining the details of the coup attempt.

== Later life ==
Severely discredited by the failure, Habicht went into seclusion in the Harz Mountains before he was allowed to take up the post of Oberbürgermeister (Mayor) of Wittenberg in February 1937; he served until September 1939. He was then selected to be the next Oberbürgermeister of Koblenz but was called up for military service and so he never formally took up that position.

His reputation partially restored, Habicht took up a more important role in November 1939, when he was appointed Undersecretary of State in the German Foreign Office. As part of his duties, he was sent to Norway in 1940 to investigate the organisation of government in the newly-occupied territory, and he called for the removal of the Vidkun Quisling government and its replacement with the Administrative Council. Initially, he had hoped to give any regime more legitimacy by placing the popular Paal Berg at its head, rather than the minor figure of Quisling, but Berg rejected any such settlement.

However, when Habicht's plans were rejected by Johan Nygaardsvold and Haakon VII of Norway, Hitler once again lost faith in Habicht and ordered him into the Wehrmacht in September 1940. He spent the remainder of his life on the Eastern Front with the rank of Hauptmann and commanded an infantry company. He had been promoted to battalion commander shortly before he died in action at Nevel.
