= Hans Krebs (SS general) =

Czech-German Nazi politician (1888–1947)

Gauleiter Hans Krebs

Regierungspräsident of the Regierungsbezirk Aussig
- In office 15 November 1938 – 8 May 1945
- Preceded by: Office established
- Succeeded by: Office abolished

Honorary Gauleiter
- In office 26 April 1938 – 8 May 1945
- Preceded by: Office established
- Succeeded by: Office abolished

Press Chief of the Reich Ministry of the Interior
- In office 30 January 1934 – 15 November 1938

Personal details
- Born: 26 April 1888 Iglau, Moravia, Austria-Hungary
- Died: 15 February 1947 (aged 58) Pankrác Prison, Prague, Czechoslovakia
- Cause of death: Execution by hanging
- Party: National Socialist German Workers'
- Other political affiliations: German Workers' Party; German National Socialist Workers' Party
- Occupation: Journalist
- Civilian awards: Golden Party Badge

Military service
- Allegiance: Austria-Hungary; Germany
- Branch/service: Austro-Hungarian Army; Schutzstaffel
- Years of service: 1914–1918; 1938–1945
- Rank: Oberleutnant; SS-Brigadeführer
- Unit: 4th Infantry Regiment
- Battles/wars: World War I
- Military awards: Medal for Bravery, in Bronze and in Silver (1st class); War Merit Cross, 1st and 2nd class without Swords

Hans Krebs (26 April 1888 – 15 February 1947) was an ethnic German born in Moravia who was an ardent German nationalist who emigrated to Nazi Germany. He joined the Nazi Party, was elected to the Reichstag and was appointed a Regierungspräsident (district president) in the Sudetenland. He was also a member of the SS, rising to the rank of SS-Brigadeführer. In 1947, Krebs was executed in Prague for high treason by the Czechoslovak Republic.

== Early life ==
Krebs was born the son of an innkeeper and clothmaker in Iglau (today, Jihlava) in Moravia when it was part of Austria-Hungary. He attended the German-language Volksschule and Oberrealschule in Iglau through 1906. He was involved with German nationalism from his youth, joining the German Workers' Party (Deutsche Arbeiterpartei, DAP) in 1907. The party's program included elements of pan-Germanism and antisemitism. He became the secretary of the Deutschen Volkswehr (German militia) in Iglau the following year. In 1910, he was made editor of the DAP news organ, the Deutsche Arbiterpresse, and publisher of the parliamentary correspondence paper, the Deutsche Arbiterkorrespondenz, both in Vienna. The same year, he rose to become general secretary of the central commission of the German Employees Association of Austria. In 1912 he became the general manager of the DAP in Vienna.

Upon the outbreak of the First World War in August 1914, Krebs volunteered for service in the Austro-Hungarian Army and was assigned to the 4th Infantry Regiment. From July 1915 he served on the front lines in Serbia and in Italy. As a Leutnant, he was a machine-gun platoon commander from August to December 1916, when he was declared unfit for further front-line service. He received several decorations, including the Medal for Bravery in two classes, and was promoted to the rank of Oberleutnant before being discharged in October 1918.

== Political activities in Czechoslovakia ==
Returning to civilian life in the newly-formed nation of Czechoslovakia, Krebs joined the DAP successor organization, the German National Socialist Workers' Party (DNSAP) with the membership number of 86, and became the editor of the Iglauer Volkswehr newspaper. Iglau had become the second largest German-speaking enclave inside Czechoslovakia and there was great political dissatisfaction among the Germans in Czechoslovakia. Also in 1918, Krebs was named the general manager of the DNSAP in the Sudetenland and the editor-in-chief of the Nationalsozialistischen Korrespondenz in Bohemia, positions which he would continue to hold until 1931. From 1918 to 1919, Krebs sat in the Bohemian Landtag and, from 1920 to 1931, he was the leader of the party secretariat for the Sudetenland. He first met Adolf Hitler in 1920. In 1925, he was elected a member of the City Council of Aussig (today, Ústí nad Labem) and a member of the Czechoslovak Chamber of Deputies, positions that he would retain until 1933. In addition, from 1927 to 1933 Krebs was the DNSAP Landesleiter (state leader) in Bohemia. He was also, between 1928 and 1930, the acting Landesleiter in Austria but largely was an absentee leader and left this post to concentrate his energies in Czechoslovakia.

On 15 May 1929, Krebs became a co-founder and Landesleiter of a DNSAP paramilitary organization under the guise of a sporting organization, the Volkssport Verband (People's Sport Association). Based on the model of the Nazi Party Sturmabteilung (SA) in Germany, its members wore brown uniforms like those of the SA and staged large rallies and marches agitating for unification with Germany. They held joint exercises with the SA and in one of these, in January 1931, SA troops crossed the border into Czech territory. The Czechoslovak government first banned the wearing of the brown uniform and, on 1 March 1932, outlawed the organization entirely. Several Volkssport Verband members were indicted and put on trial for high treason in Brno between 8 August and 24 September 1932. During the trial, Krebs was implicated but was protected by parliamentary immunity. In November, prosecutors sought permission from the parliament to proceed against him and, on 28 February 1933, Krebs was indicted, then arrested and imprisoned for several months. Released on parole on the condition that he not engage in further unlawful activities, he broke parole by fleeing to Germany in July.

== Career in Nazi Germany ==
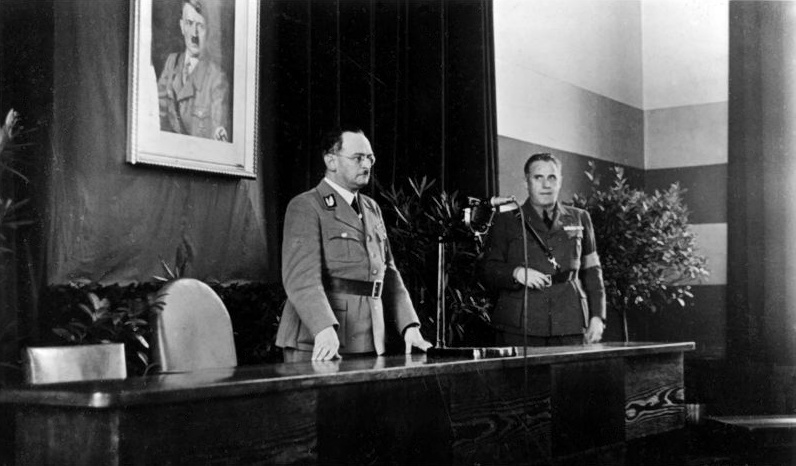
Gauleiter Hans Krebs (on left), in the Reich Ministry of the Interior, 1938

In Germany, Krebs became an advisor to Hitler on Czechoslovak issues. He joined the Nazi Party and was granted an effective date of 1 April 1925 along with his old DNSAP party membership number of 86. He joined the SA as an SA-Obersturmbannführer and, on 30 January 1934, was employed as a press advisor in the Reich Interior Ministry, under Reichsminister Wilhelm Frick. In November 1934, he was made head of the Professional Publications Library in the ministry, and was appointed a Regierungsrat (Government Councilor) in February 1935. On 29 March 1936, he was elected to the Reichstag from electoral constituency 3 (Berlin-East) and would retain this seat until the fall of the Nazi regime. In the mid-1930s he wrote two books arguing the Sudeten German case: Kampf in Böhmen (Berlin, 1936) and Wir Sudetendeutsche (Berlin, 1937). Krebs was advanced to Oberregierungsrat (Senior Government Councilor) on 30 January 1937 and also was promoted to SA-Standartenführer. In October 1937, Franz von Papen was rumored to be leaving his post as German ambassador to Austria and Krebs was the preferred choice as his replacement among Austrian Nazis. In the end, no replacement was named, as Papen stayed on until just before the Austrian Anschluss in March 1938. Krebs left the SA and transferred to the Schutzstaffel (SS) on 1 April 1938 (SS number 292,802) and was assigned to the SS Main Office. He would subsequently be promoted to SS-Oberführer (16 October 1938) and to SS-Brigadeführer (9 November 1940) when he was assigned to the staff of the Reichsführer-SS. On the occasion of Krebs' 50th birthday on 26 April 1938, Hitler awarded him the title of Honorary Gauleiter. He was also later awarded the Golden Party Badge.

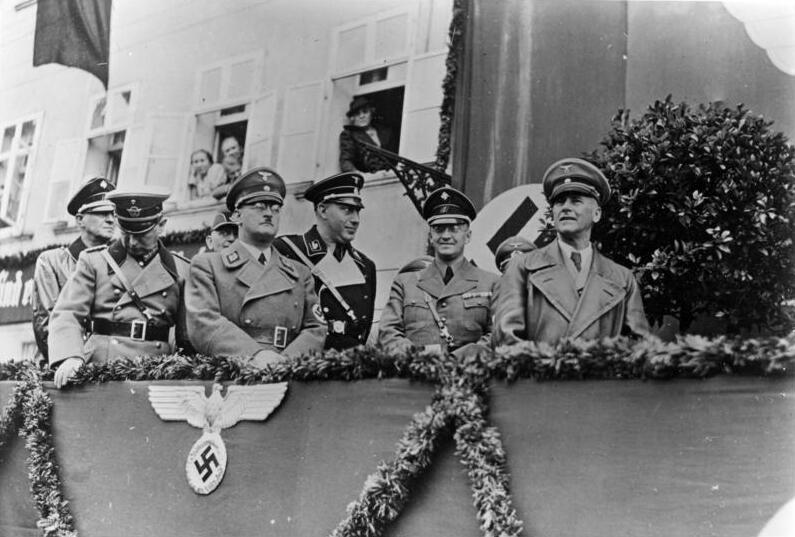
Krebs in the Sudetenland on 23 September 1938 during a visit with other Nazi officials. From right to left: Wilhelm Frick, Reich Interior Minister, Konrad Henlein, Sudetenland Gauleiter, Wilhelm Stuckart, State Secretary, Interior Ministry, Krebs and Adolf von Bomhard, Generalleutnant of the Ordnungspolizei

From August to October 1938, Krebs headed the Sudeten German Refugee Relief Program in Berlin, receiving a promotion to Ministerialrat (Ministerial Councilor) in the Interior Ministry on 27 September. Between the Munich agreement of 29 September 1938 when the Sudetenland was ceded to Germany and the end of the year, over 150,000 inhabitants fled the area, including Czechs and Germans who were defined as Jews under the Nuremberg Laws. Those who remained were subjected to the persecution and violence that followed, including the looting and destruction of the Kristallnacht pogrom of 9–10 November. Krebs was charged on 15 November 1938 with conducting the government affairs of the Regierungsbezirk Aussig, one of the three administrative regions established within the Reichsgau Sudetenland. He was named Acting Regierungspräsident on 15 December and the appointment was made permanent on 31 March 1939. During his tenure, Jews living in Aussig were systematically persecuted and, on New Year's Eve in 1938, the Synagoge (Ústí nad Labem) was attacked and burned down. A butcher shop was later established on the site. At the end of 1941 and early 1942, Jewish residents were rounded up and deported to the Theresienstadt Ghetto and ultimately the extermination camps. Of the approximately 1,250 members of the Jewish community in Aussig, it is estimated that only about 200 people survived the war by emigrating. Just a few of the survivors returned to the city after the war.

In 1942, Krebs was considered for the post of Gauleiter in the planned but never established Reichsgau Flandern. On 20 May 1943, Konrad Henlein the Gauleiter in the Reichsgau Sudetenland, nominated Krebs to be his deputy but this was vetoed by Martin Bormann, the chief of the Party Chancellery, and the post went to Hermann Neuburg in the fall of that year. Krebs then served on the staff of the SS-Oberabschnitt Elbe in Dresden and, on 1 May 1944, was transferred to the staff of the SS-Oberabschnitt Böhmen-Mähren headquartered in Prague.

== Post-war ==
After the end of World War II in Europe, Krebs was arrested by Czechoslovak authorities in May 1945 and incarcerated at Pankrác Prison. He was put on trial by the Czechoslovak Republic, convicted of high treason and executed by hanging in Prague in February 1947.

SA and SS ranks
date	rank
1933	SA-Obersturmbannführer
30 January 1937	SA-Standartenführer
1 April 1938	SS-Standartenführer
16 October 1938	SS-Oberführer
9 November 1940	SS-Brigadeführer

== Writings ==
- Kampf in Böhmen, (Berlin: Volk und Reich Verlag, 1936)
- Wir Sudetendeutsche, (Berlin: Runge, 1937)

== See also ==
- The Holocaust in the Sudetenland

== Sources ==
- Bullock, Alan (1962). Hitler: A Study in Tyranny. New York: Harper Torchbooks. ISBN 978-0-060-92020-3.
- Evans, Richard J. (2005). The Third Reich in Power. New York: Penguin Press. ISBN 978-0-143-03790-3.
- Miller, Michael D.; Schulz, Andreas (2017). Gauleiter: The Regional Leaders of the Nazi Party and Their Deputies, 1925–1945. Vol. 2 (Georg Joel – Dr. Bernhard Rust). R. James Bender Publishing. ISBN 978-1-932-97032-6.
