= Subir Das =

Indian physicist

Subir Das is a Professor of Theoretical Physics at the Jawaharlal Nehru Centre for Advanced Scientific Research in Bangalore, India. His primary area of research is statistical mechanics of systems close to phase transitions.

Das received his PhD from Jawaharlal Nehru University in 2002. Subsequently, he worked as a postdoctoral researcher at the University of Mainz, Germany, with Kurt Binder and Juergen Horbach (2002-2005), and at the University of Maryland, USA, with Michael Fisher (2005-2007). Since 2007 he is a faculty member at Jawaharlal Nehru Centre for Advanced Scientific Research in Bangalore, India.

His research interests are in phase transition and critical phenomena.

== Most cited peer reviewed papers ==
- Block BJ, Das SK, Oettel M, Virnau P, Binder K. Curvature dependence of surface free energy of liquid drops and bubbles: A simulation study. The Journal of Chemical Physics. 2010 Oct 21;133(15):154702. According to Google Scholar, this article has been cited 143 times
- Horbach J, Das SK, Griesche A, Macht MP, Frohberg G, Meyer A. Self-diffusion and interdiffusion in Al 80 Ni 20 melts: Simulation and experiment. Physical Review B. 2007 May 22;75(17):174304. According to Google Scholar, this article has been cited 137 times
