= Ostmark (Austria) =

Nazi name for Austria (1938–1942)

- Reichsgau of Nazi Germany
- 1938–1939
- Flag Coat of arms
- Capital: Vienna
- Government
- Reichsstatthalter
  - 1938–1939: Arthur Seyss-Inquart
- History
  - Established: 1938
  - Disestablished: 1939
Preceded by	Succeeded by
Federal State of Austria	Nazi Germany

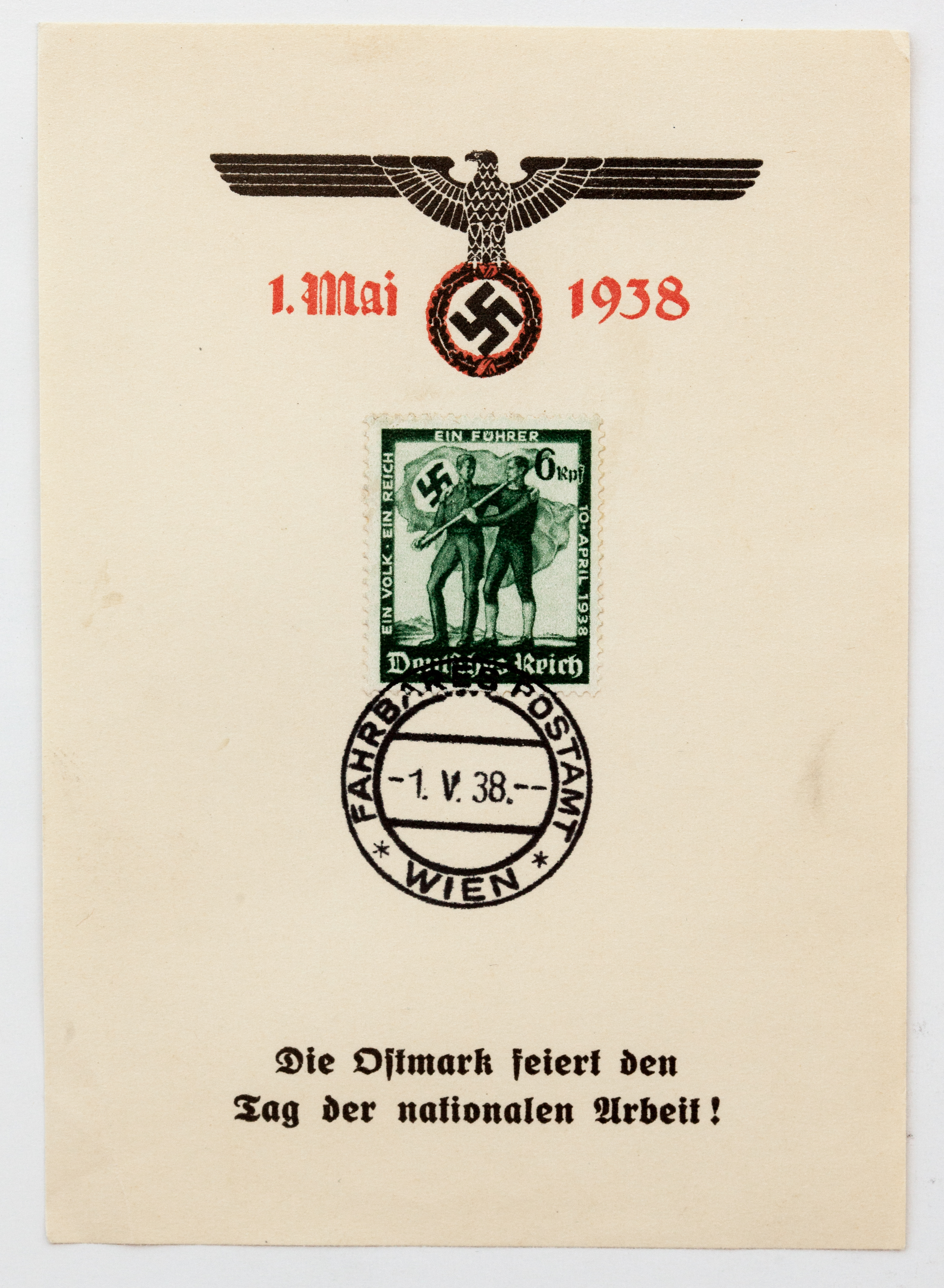
1938 postage stamp showing a German and Austrian embracing with the date "10 April 1938," marking the sham referendum that legalised the Anschluss. The text translates as, "1 May 1938: The Eastern March celebrates the Day of National Labour!"

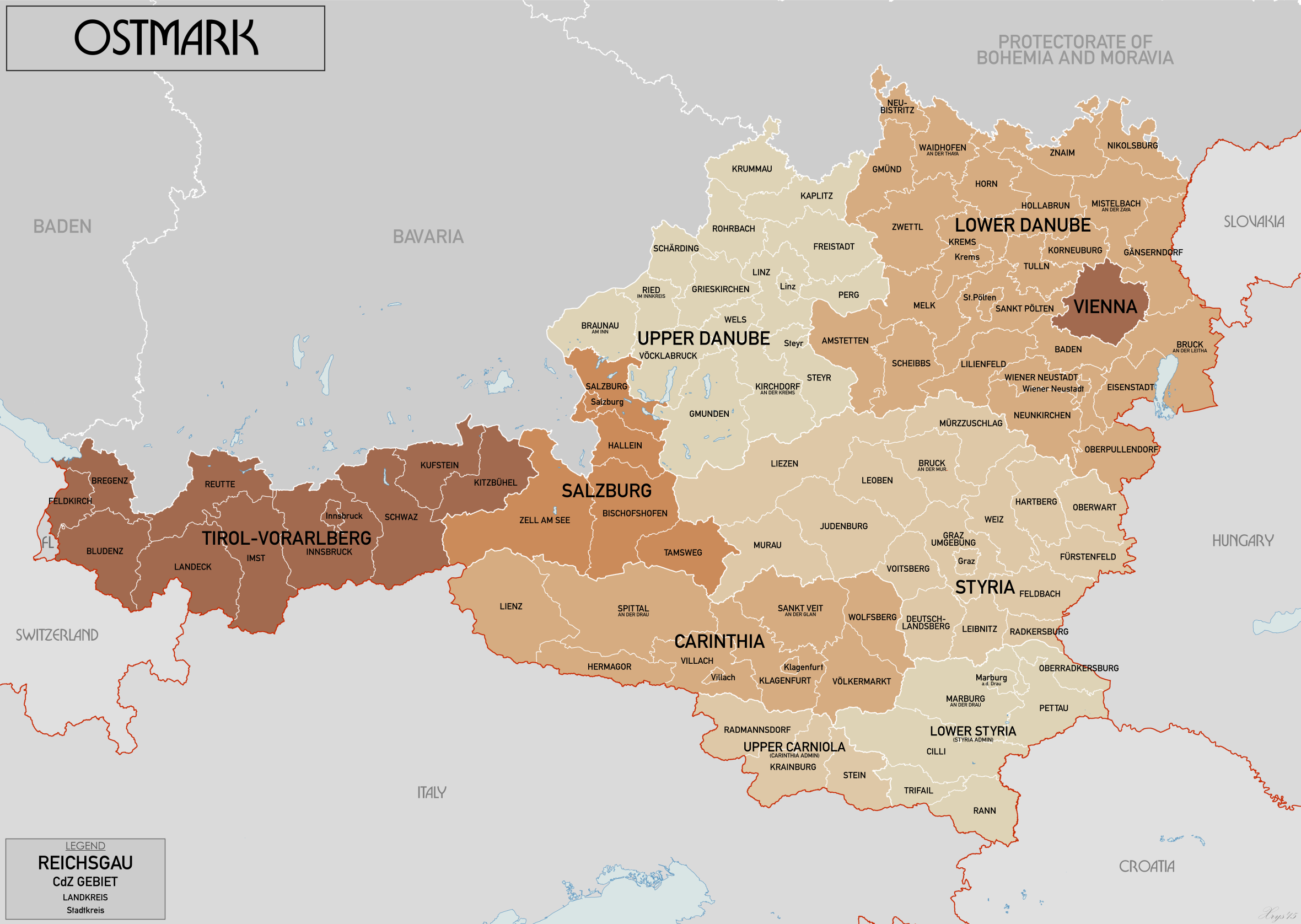
Administrative map of Ostmark in 1941. Showing Reichsgaue and CdZ Gebiete subdivided into Landkreise and Stadtkreise.

Ostmark (German pronunciation: [ˈɔstmaʁk], "Eastern March") was a name that referred historically to the Margraviate of Austria, a medieval frontier march. It was also used in Nazi propaganda from 1938 to 1942 to refer to the formerly independent Federal State of Austria after the Anschluss with Nazi Germany. From the Anschluss until 1939, the official name used was Land Österreich ("State of Austria").

== History ==
Once Adolf Hitler completed the union between Austria and Germany (Anschluss), the Nazi government renamed the incorporated territory. The name Austria (Österreich in German, meaning "Eastern Realm") was at first replaced by "Ostmark", referring to the 10th century Marcha orientalis. The change was meant to refer to Austria as the new "eastern march" of the Reich. The Nazi authorities sought to erase all traces of an independent and distinct Austrian state. From 8 April 1942, even the term "Ostmark" was considered too closely associated with the former Austrian state, and the official designation for the seven administrative entities was changed to Alpen- und Donau-Reichsgaue ("Alpine and Danubian Reichsgaue").

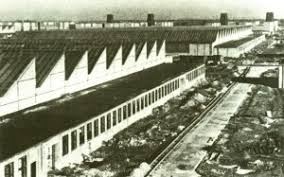
The Flugmotorenwerke Ostmark ('Eastern March Aircraft Engine Factories') in Wiener Neudorf, 1944.

== Subdivisions ==
According to the Ostmarkgesetz with effect from 1 May 1939, the former States of Austria were further divided and reorganized into seven Reichsgaue of the German Reich, each under the rule of a government official holding the dual offices of Reichsstatthalter (governor) and Gauleiter (Nazi Party leader):

- Carinthia, including East Tyrol; increased by Slovenian Carinthia and Upper Carniola as occupied territories after the 1941 Balkans Campaign
- Lower Danube (Niederdonau), name for Lower Austria, with its capital at Krems an der Donau, including the northern districts of Burgenland with Eisenstadt, the South Moravian territories around Znojmo (Deutsch-Südmähren) annexed with the Sudetenland according to the 1938 Munich Agreement and also the Bratislava boroughs of Petržalka (Engerau) and Devín (Theben)
- Salzburg
- Styria, including the southern districts of Burgenland; increased by Lower Styria as occupied territory after the 1941 Balkans Campaign
- Upper Danube (Oberdonau), name for Upper Austria, including the Styrian Aussee region (Ausseerland) and the South Bohemian territories around Český Krumlov annexed with the "Sudetenland" according to the 1938 Munich Agreement
- Tirol-Vorarlberg, i.e. North Tyrol, with the administrative district of Vorarlberg
- Vienna, i.e. "Greater Vienna", including several surrounding Lower Austrian municipalities incorporated in 1938.

A Reichsgau was a new, simple administrative sub-division institution which replaced the federal states in the otherwise completely centralized Third Reich. In the course of the Allied occupation after World War II, the Austrian state was restored in its pre-1938 borders according to the 1943 Moscow Declaration.

== See also ==
- Austria within Nazi Germany
- Areas annexed by Nazi Germany
