= July Putsch =

Coup d'état attempt in Austria in 1934

- Part of the interwar period
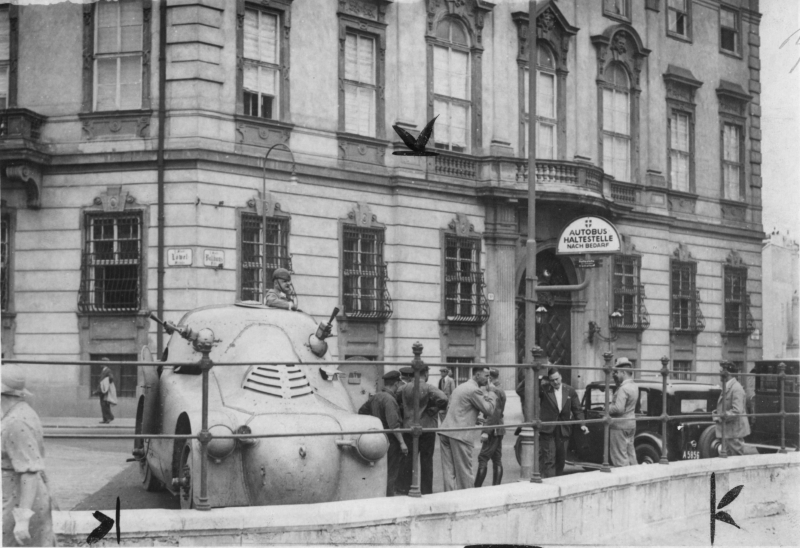
- Police car at Ballhausplatz outside the Chancellery building in Vienna, 25 July 1934
Date	25–30 July 1934 (6 days)
Location	Austria
Result	Austrian government victory: Austrian Nazi Party coup d'etat failed; Fatherland Front remains in power; Chancellor Engelbert Dollfuss is assassinated; Potential German invasion averted

Belligerents
Schutzstaffel (SS): SS Standarte 89; Austrian Nazi Party supporters Austrian Legion; Supported by: Germany	Federal State of Austria; Fatherland Front; Federal Army; Federal Gendarmerie; Heimwehr; Supported by: Italy

Commanders and leaders
Fridolin Glass; Otto Wächter; Anton Rintelen (surrendered)	Engelbert Dollfuss †; Wilhelm Miklas; Kurt Schuschnigg; Ernst Rüdiger Starhemberg; Emil Fey

Strength
154 SS (Vienna) thousands (elsewhere)	Entire Federal Army, police, gendarmeries, and paramilitary Heimwehr forces

Casualties and losses
98–140 killed 13 executed 4,000 imprisoned	101–104 killed
- 11–13 civilians killed

The July Putsch (German: Juliputsch) was a failed coup d'état in Austria against the Fatherland Front government of Engelbert Dollfuss by Austrian Nazis from 25 to 30 July 1934.

The Austrian Legion and Austrian Schutzstaffel soldiers with support from Nazi Germany attempted to depose Dollfuss's Austrofascist regime in favor of a pro-Nazi government under Anton Rintelen of the Christian Social Party. The Nazis attacked the Federal Chancellery and assassinated Dollfuss, but the majority of the Austrian population and the Austrian Army remained loyal to the government. The July Putsch ultimately failed when Adolf Hitler withdrew his support for the coup after Fascist Italy guaranteed to diplomatically support Austria against a German invasion.

The Austrian government eventually suppressed the coup, with over 200 people being killed in six days of fighting. A number of Austrian Nazis and collaborators were charged with treason and executed or imprisoned. Kurt Schuschnigg succeeded Dollfuss as Chancellor of Austria and the Fatherland Front remained in power under the Federal State of Austria until the Anschluss in 1938.

== Background ==
Since the 1920s, the First Austrian Republic had been plagued by political violence between various right-wing and left-wing factions. The Austrian right-wing was divided between Pan-Germans who sought Austria's unification with Germany, and Austrian nationalists who opposed it. On 30 January 1933, Adolf Hitler was appointed Chancellor of Germany by President Paul von Hindenburg, giving an enormous boost to Austrian Nazis, who strongly supported unification with Germany.

On 4 March 1933, the Austrian chancellor Engelbert Dollfuss was able to exploit a situation in the National Council to obstruct further sessions, effectively causing the self-elimination of the Austrian Parliament and establishing himself as a dictator. Dollfuss was a conservative Catholic Austrian nationalist who opposed to Hitler and Nazism, portraying himself as the defender of an independent Catholic Austria from Nazi infiltration. The Austrian Nazis responded with demands for a new election, massive propaganda, and a bombing campaign, to which Dollfuss responded with authoritarian measures such as house searches and arrests.

On 8 March, the situation was exacerbated by Hans Frank, the Nazi Minister of Justice of Bavaria, who in a public speech threatened the Austrian government with an armed intervention by Nazi forces. Nevertheless, the Austrian government initially concentrated on the ban of the Communist Party of Austria and the paramilitary Republikanischer Schutzbund of the Social Democratic Workers' Party of Austria. On 15 May, Frank traveled to Vienna, where he spoke out against the Dollfuss regime and Jews, and addressed Austrian Germans to encourage civil disobedience. In response, Dollfuss ordered the deportation of Frank and another 100 German Nazis from the country. He had nearly 2,400 Austrian Nazis arrested for pelting the paramilitary Heimwehr with eggs, rocks, and vegetables. On 19 June, in response to a bombing campaign by Austrian Nazis that had left several people dead and dozens wounded, the Austrian Nazi Party was banned. Hitler's government reacted with harsh economic sanctions aimed at Austrian tourism, known as the Thousand-mark ban.

After the Nazi Party was banned in Austria, many Austrian Nazis fled to Germany and joined the paramilitary Austrian Legion under the command of Hermann Reschny, while others remained in Austria and continued their actions illegally.

In February 1934, Dollfuss and his Fatherland Front emerged victorious in the four-day Austrian Civil War against the Social Democrats. He established Austria as a one-party state that was staunchly opposed to the Nazis and unification with Germany.

== Events ==
On 25 July 1934, in the midst of difficult social and political tensions in Austria, and with the knowledge of official German positions, 154 Schutzstaffel (SS) men disguised as Bundesheer soldiers and policemen pushed into the Austrian chancellery. Dollfuss was killed by two bullets fired by Nazis Rudolf Prochaska and Otto Planetta, though the rest of the Austrian government was able to escape. Another group occupied the RAVAG radio building and broadcast a false report about the putative transfer of power from Dollfuss to Anton Rintelen, which was to have been the call for Nazis all over Austria to begin the uprising against the state. There were several days of fighting in parts of Carinthia, Styria and Upper Austria as well as smaller uprisings in Salzburg. There was fighting in Upper Styria, both the industrial area between Judenburg and Leoben and in Enns, the Deutschlandsberg District in southwestern Styria, and in southeastern Styria by Bad Radkersburg. Bloody clashes took place in and around Schladming and Leoben.

In Carinthia, the centres of the coup were in Lower Carinthia and Sankt Paul im Lavanttal. In Upper Austria, in addition to individual actions in the Salzkammergut, the fighting was concentrated in the Pyhrn Pass and in the Mühlviertel, where on the night of 26 July, in the Kollerschlag area on the German-Austrian border, a division of the Austrian Legion invaded Austrian territory from Bavaria and attacked the customs guard and a police station. Many of the Austrian Nazis were not armed since they had believed that the Austrian military and police would join them once the coup began, but most forces stayed loyal to the Fatherland Front government. On 26 July, a German courier was arrested at the border crossing in Kollerschlag who was carrying precise instructions for the putsch known as the "Kollerschlag Document", which testified to a clear connection between Bavaria and the July Putsch.

The death of Dollfuss enraged Benito Mussolini, the Fascist leader of Italy, whose wife Rachele was entertaining the rest of Dollfuss's family. Mussolini moved troops to the Italian-Austrian border and told Hitler that he was not to invade Austria. This made Hitler proclaim that he did not support the coup, which ultimately led to its failure.

== Aftermath ==
The July Putsch was finally crushed by the Austrian police, military and paramilitary units loyal to the government. There is varying information regarding the number of fatalities. Gerhard Jagschitz took over the work of military historian Erwin Steinböck. In 1965 his figures claimed that the July coup and its immediate consequences lead to the deaths of 270 people: 153 Nazi supporters died (including 13 executed and seven people who committed suicide), 104 died on the Government side, along with 13 civilians. In contrast, Austrian historian Kurt Bauer's extensive studies concluded that there were 223 deaths: 111 Nazi supporters, including the 13 who were executed, 101 on the Government side, and 11 civilians. The number of injured is estimated at 500–600 people.

On 26 July 1934, military tribunals and courts-martial were convened to prosecute the rebels. Dozens of death sentences were imposed, of which 13 were carried out. Of those executed, four of them were on-duty police officers who had collaborated with the rebels during the seizure of the Federal Chancellery. Vienna police officers Josef Hackl, Erich Wohlrab, Franz Leeb, and Ludwig Maitzen were defendants in a mass trial of nine police officers for collaboration. Hackl, Wohlrab, Leeb, and Maitzen were found guilty of high treason, sentenced to death, and executed by hanging on 13 August 1934. The other officers received sentences ranging from 10 years to life in prison. One other collaborator, on-duty soldier Ernst Feike, was executed on 7 August 1934. Another 4,000 rebels received prison sentences or were detained. In Vienna alone, at least 260 police officers were arrested after officials found a list of Nazi Party members while searching a police officer's home.

Many rebels fled to Yugoslavia or to Germany. Kurt von Schuschnigg became the new Chancellor of Austria and Ernst Rüdiger Starhemberg remained as Vice-Chancellor. After the failed putsch, Hitler closed down the Munich office of the Austrian Nazi Party.

In September 1934, Mussolini announced a "Pax Romana" alliance with France against Germany in response to the July Putsch, and Italy's opposition to Anschluss. Mussolini said that Italy would no longer support Germany's intentions to revise the Versailles Treaty and German rearmament.

== See also ==
- Austria in the time of National Socialism
- Austrian Civil War
- Night of the Long Knives
