= Reschny =

Reschny is a surname. Notable people with the surname include:

- Cole Reschny (born 2007), Canadian ice hockey player
- Hermann Reschny (1898–1971), Austrian Nazi politician and head of the Austrian Sturmabteilung (SA)
- Walter Reschny (1931–2011), German entrepreneur
