= Hermann Reschny =

Austrian Nazi and SA general

Führer, Austrian Legion
- In office June 1933 – April 1938
- Preceded by: Position established
- Succeeded by: Position abolished

Führer, SA-Obergruppe VIII (SA-Obergruppe XI from 27 March 1934)
- In office 7 July 1933 – August 1934
- Preceded by: Position established
- Succeeded by: Position abolished

Führer, Austrian SA
- In office June 1926 – 19 June 1933
- Preceded by: Position established
- Succeeded by: Position outlawed

Additional positions
- 1936–1938: Reichstag Deputy
- 1932–1933: Austrian Federal Council Deputy
- 1932: Landtag of Lower Austria Deputy

Personal details
- Born: 15 June 1898 Stammersdorf, Vienna, Austria-Hungary
- Died: 7 January 1971 (aged 72) Graz, Lower Austria, Austria
- Party: Nazi Party
- Occupation: Schoolteacher

Military service
- Allegiance: Austria-Hungary; Nazi Germany
- Branch/service: Austro-Hungarian Army; German Army
- Years of service: 1916–1919; 1939–1945
- Rank: Hauptmann
- Battles/wars: World War I World War II

Hermann Reschny (15 June 1898 – 7 January 1971) was an Austrian Nazi politician and head of the Austrian Sturmabteilung (SA) who rose to the rank of SA-Obergruppenführer. A member of the state and federal parliaments in Austria, he fled to Nazi Germany after Austria outlawed the Nazis. There, he commanded the expatriate Austrian Legion and served as a member of the German Reichstag from 1936 to 1938. He fought in the German Army during the Second World War and, after Germany's defeat, he was tried for treason in Austria and sentenced to sixteen years' imprisonment.

== Early life ==
Reschny was born in Stammersdorf (today, part of the Floridsdorf district of Vienna) and was educated in the local Volksschule, a Bürgerschule and the seminary in Feldkirch. From 1916 to 1919, he served as an officer in the Austro-Hungarian Army and took part in the First World War, serving on both the eastern and the Italian fronts. From 1919 to 1933, Reschny worked in Vienna as a schoolteacher.

== Austrian Nazi career ==
In post-war Austria, Reschny was a member of the Nazi Party of Austria and its paramilitary group, the Vaterländischer Schutzbund (VS). When the Party split in 1926, he was one of the individuals that engineered the schism and led the VS into the faction that aligned with Adolf Hitler and his German Nazi movement. Reschny was rewarded by Hitler in June 1926 by being made the head of the Sturmabteilung (SA) in Austria. Reschny formally joined the Nazi Party on 3 September 1926 (membership number 52,036). He served as the leader of a local Party chapter. As the SA troops under his command expanded, Reschny was appointed leader of the SA-Gruppe Österreich on 1 July 1932. That year, he also was elected as a Nazi member of the Landtag of Lower Austria and, from June 1932 to June 1933, of the Austrian Federal Council, the upper house of the Austrian parliament.

On 19 June 1933, 32 auxiliary policemen in Krems were wounded by hand grenades in a terrorist attack by Nazis, and the Austrian government of Chancellor Engelbert Dollfuß responded by outlawing the Nazi Party. Reschny, who had been promoted to SA-Obergruppenführer on 20 April 1933, was the leader of the now-illegal Austrian SA, which was reorganized as SA-Obergruppe VIII on 7 July 1933 (redesignated SA-Obergruppe XI from 27 March 1934). Reschny and thousands of other Austrian SA personnel fled Austria for Nazi Germany. Organized under the name the Austrian Legion, they were placed under Reschny's command as part of his Obergruppe and were settled in camps along the Bavarian border. They received paramilitary training from the German army, the SA and the Bavarian police. They organized the smuggling of arms, explosives and propaganda materials into Austria to continue their campaign of destabilizing the Austrian regime.

== Life in Germany ==
The Austrian government feared an SA-led invasion from the estimated 14,000 members of the Austrian Legion. They constituted a serious threat to Austrian sovereignty, as Reschny almost immediately became involved in developing plans to march on Vienna in an attempt to overthrow the Dollfuß government. He held discussions in October 1933 with Ernst Röhm, the German SA-Stabschef, and other Austrian Nazis. Plans for a strike on 9 November, the tenth anniversary of the Munich Beer Hall Putsch, were shelved due to a lack of sufficient weaponry. Planning continued through the winter into spring, and another assault planned for 15 March 1934 also failed to materialize. When an internal coup finally took place on 25 July 1934, the chancellery was briefly seized by SS troops and Dollfuß was killed, however the revolt was suppressed within days by Austrian army and security forces. Reschny's Austrian Legion made only limited, ineffectual border raids. Internal rivalries between the SA, the political leadership under Landesleiter Theodor Habicht and participating SS forces, as well as poor communications, all contributed to the ultimate failure of the coup.

After the collapse of the putsch, Hitler disavowed any German interference in Austria's internal affairs. Reschny remained in Munich and continued to oversee the actions of the Austrian Legion expatriates. However, by the fall of 1935, in order to de-escalate tensions, the Legion was transferred to the Rhineland area. Reschny now also headed a front organization named SA-Hilfswerk Nordwest (Northwest Relief Organization) rendering assistance to Austrian refugees. However, he continued to meet with SA leaders from Austria in violation of Hitler's orders forbidding interference by refugees in Austrian affairs.

Reschny was elected in March 1936 as a deputy to the Reichstag for constituency 20 (Cologne-Aachen) in the Rhineland and served until April 1938 when he was not reelected. Following the Anschluss of March 1938 that united Austria with the German Reich, the Austrian Legion was not allowed to participate in Hitler's triumphal entry into Vienna. Reschny and his Legion were permitted a ceremonial march into the now renamed Ostmark on 2 April, but the Legion was demobilized two weeks later. Many returned to Germany and those that remained faced unemployment or low-wage jobs and many subsisted on public assistance. Reschny never regained the prominence he had enjoyed prior to the failed July Putsch, and he was not given any major political role in Austria or Germany. From 1939, he took part in the Second World War as an officer in the German Army with the rank of Hauptmann. After the end of the war, he was sentenced to sixteen years in prison by an Austrian court in 1948 and was released in an amnesty in 1957. He died in Graz in 1971.

== Sources ==
- The Austrian Legion in the Bavarian Historical Lexicon
- Bukey, Evan Burr (2002). Hitler's Austria: Popular Sentiment in the Nazi Era, 1938–1945. University of North Carolina Press. ISBN 9780807853634.
- Campbell, Bruce (1998). The SA Generals and the Rise of Nazism. Lexington: University Press of Kentucky. ISBN 978-0-813-12047-8.
- Information about Hermann Reschny in the Reichstag database
- Pauley, Bruce F. (1981). Hitler and the Forgotten Nazis: A History of Austrian National Socialism. The University of North Carolina Press. ISBN 978-0-807-84182-2.
- Reschny, Hermann entry in the Austria Forum
- Reschny, Hermann entry in the Austrian parliament website
- Siemens, Daniel (2017). Stormtroopers: A New History of Hitler's Brownshirts. New Haven: Yale University Press. ISBN 978-0-300-19681-8.
- Stockhorst, Erich (1985). 5000 Köpfe: Wer War Was im 3. Reich. Arndt. p. 343 ISBN 978-3-887-41116-9.
