= Kurt Binder =

Austrian physicist (1944–2022)

- Born: 10 February 1944; Korneuburg, Austria
- Died: 27 September 2022 (aged 78)
- Known for: Binder parameter, Monte Carlo simulations, phase transitions, polymer physics
- Awards: Max Planck Medal (1993); Boltzmann Medal (2007)
- Scientific career
- Fields: Theoretical Physics
- Workplaces: University of Mainz, Germany
- Doctoral students: Kurt Kremer

Kurt Binder (10 February 1944 – 27 September 2022) was an Austrian theoretical physicist.

== Biography ==
He received his Ph.D. in 1969 at the Technical University of Vienna, and his habilitation degree 1973 at the Technical University of Munich. He decided to accept a professorship post for Theoretical Physics at the Saarland University, having an offer from the Freie University in Berlin as well at the same time. From 1977 to 1983, he headed a group for Theoretical Physics in the Institute for Solid State Research at the Forschungszentrum Jülich, prior to taking his present post as a University Professor for Theoretical Physics at the University of Mainz, Germany. Since 1989 he was also an external member of the Max-Planck-Institute for Polymer Physics in Mainz.

Since 1977, Binder was married to Marlies Ecker, with whom he had two sons.

His research was in several areas of condensed matter physics and statistical physics. He was best known for pioneering the development of Monte Carlo simulations as a quantitative tool in statistical and condensed matter physics, establishing simulations as a third branch in addition to theory and experiment, and for catalyzing its application in many areas of physical research. He made very important contributions to numerous fields, ranging from phase transitions and spin glasses to polymer physics. He is one of the most cited physicists worldwide. The eponymous Binder cumulant is a very important and frequently used quantity in analyzing phase diagrams.

Binder was a member of the editorial board of several leading scientific journals as well as a member of academies of science in Austria, Bulgaria, and Germany.

== Awards (selection) ==
- Max Planck Medal of the German Physical Society in 1993
- Berni J. Alder CECAM Prize in 2001
- Staudinger-Durrer Prize at the ETH Zurich in 2003
- Honorary doctoral degree of the Marie Curie-Sklodowska University in Lublin in 2007
- Boltzmann Medal of the International Union of Pure and Applied Physics in 2007
- First fellow of the 'Gutenberg Kolleg' in Mainz, 2007
- Honorary doctoral degree of the University of Düsseldorf in 2013
- Polymer Physics Prize of the American Physical Society in 2020

== Books ==
- (as editor:) Monte Carlo methods in statistical physics. Springer, Berlin [etc.] 1979, ISBN 3-540-09018-5; 2nd edition, 1986, ISBN 3-540-16514-2
- (as editor:) Applications of the Monte Carlo method in statistical physics. Berlin, Springer [etc.] 1984, ISBN 3-540-12764-X; 2nd edition, 1987, ISBN 3-540-17650-0
- with Dieter W. Heermann: Monte Carlo simulation in statistical physics. An introduction. Springer, Berlin [etc.] 1988, ISBN 3-540-19107-0; 5th edition, 2010, ISBN 978-3-642-03162-5
- (as editor:) The Monte Carlo Method in Condensed Matter Physics. Springer, Berlin [etc.] 1992, ISBN 3-540-54369-4; 2nd edition, 1995, ISBN 3-540-60174-0
- Theories and mechanism of phase transitions, heterophase polymerizations, homopolymerization, addition polymerization. Springer, Berlin [etc.] 1994, ISBN 3-540-57236-8
- (as editor:) Monte Carlo and Molecular Dynamics Simulations in Polymer Science. Oxford University Press, New York 1995, ISBN 0-19-509438-7
- with David P. Landau: A Guide to Monte Carlo Simulations in Statistical Physics. Cambridge University Press, Cambridge [etc.] 2000, ISBN 0-521-65366-5; 3rd edition, 2009, ISBN 978-0-521-76848-1
- Computer-Simulation von Flüssigkeiten und Festkörpern. Steiner, Stuttgart 2005, ISBN 3-515-08753-2
- with Walter Kob: Glassy materials and disordered solids. An introduction to their statistical mechanics. World Scientific, New Jersey, NJ [etc.] 2005, ISBN 981-256-510-8; 2nd edition, 2011, ISBN 978-981-4273-44-2
- (as editor:) Statistical mechanics of polymers. New developments. Selected contributions from the conference in Moscow (Russia), 6–11 June 2006 (= Macromolecular symposia, vol. 252). Wiley-VCH, Weinheim 2007
