= Binder parameter =

Kurtosis of the order parameter in statistical physics

The Binder parameter or Binder cumulant in statistical physics, also known as the fourth-order cumulant $U_L=1-\frac{{\langle s^4\rangle}_L}{3{\langle s^2\rangle}^2_L}$ is defined as the kurtosis (more precisely, minus one third times the excess kurtosis) of the order parameter, s, introduced by Austrian theoretical physicist Kurt Binder. It is frequently used to determine accurately phase transition points in numerical simulations of various models.

The phase transition point is usually identified comparing the behavior of $U$ as a function of the temperature for different values of the system size $L$. The transition temperature is the unique point where the different curves cross in the thermodynamic limit. This behavior is based on the fact that in the critical region, $T\approx T_c$, the Binder parameter behaves as $U(T,L)=b(\epsilon L^{1/\nu})$, where $\epsilon=\frac{T-T_c}{T}$.

Accordingly, the cumulant may also be used to identify the universality class of the transition by determining the value of the critical exponent $\nu$ of the correlation length.

In the thermodynamic limit, at the critical point, the value of the Binder parameter depends on boundary conditions, the shape of the system, and anisotropy of correlations.

A generalization called the geometric Binder cumulant (GBC) also exists. Unlike the conventional Binder cumulant, which is based on expectation values of operators representing physical quantities, the GBC implements the Binder cumulant scheme in cases in which the relevant physical quantity is a geometric phase, which happens in many systems which are inherently quantum mechanical. For example, bulk dielectric polarization in crystalline insulators can only be described as a geometric phase, the associated Binder cumulant is a GBC. In this case the GBC can be used as a gauge of the metal-insulator transition, which is an example of a quantum phase transition.

== Binder parameter values ==
The value of the Binder parameter depends upon the shape of the system and the boundary conditions used, but not upon the type of percolation considered, as long as the system is at a critical point. Measurements have been made for several systems:

Ising model, square boundary with periodic b.c.: U = 0.6106901(5). (Note authors calculate M_{2}^{2}/M_{4} = 0.8562157(5).)

Square boundary and periodic boundary conditions:

Percolation on 2d Chimera lattices: U = 0.8
