= Greater Vienna =

Nazi era concept of enlarged Vienna

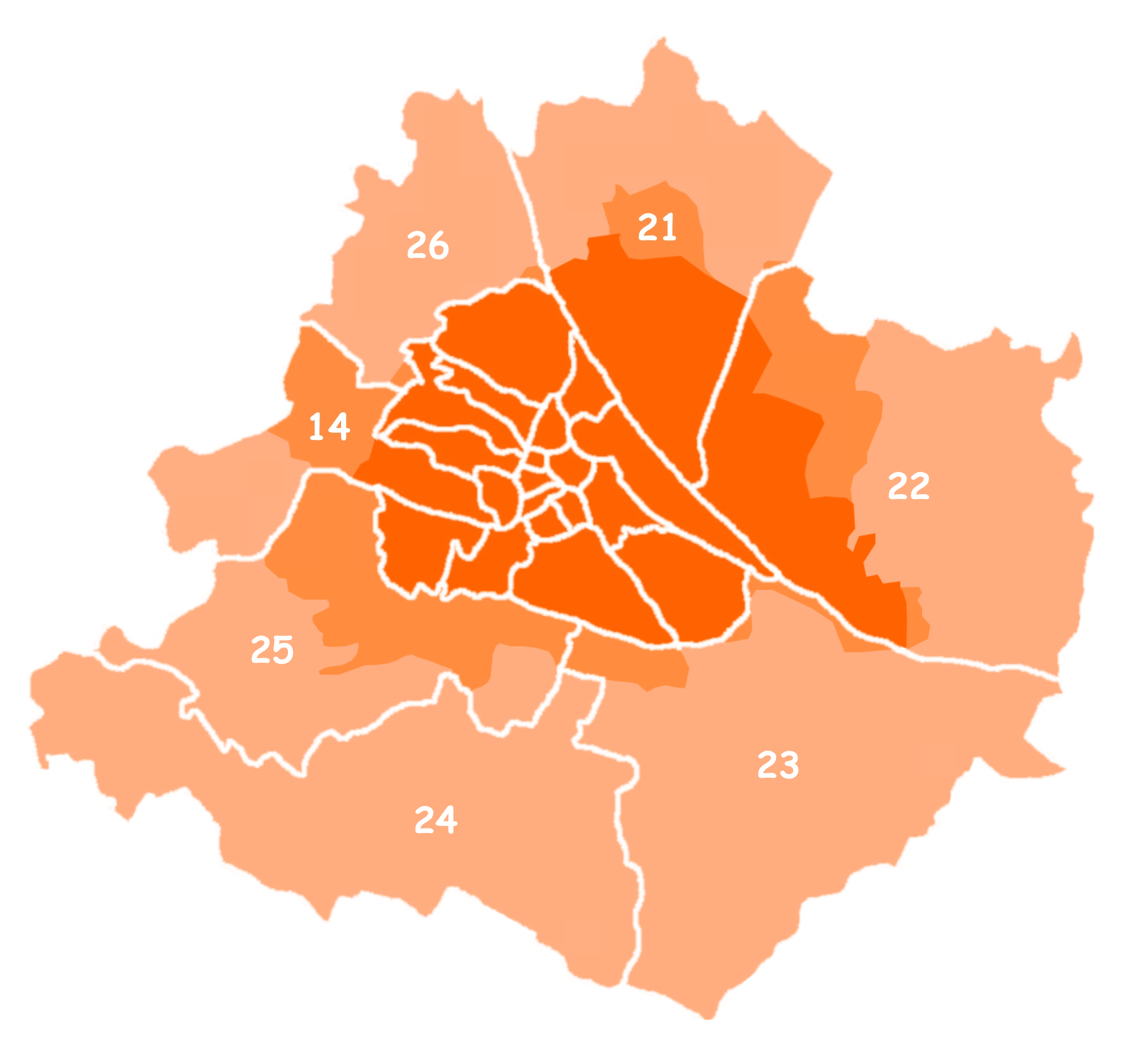
Map of Greater Vienna during the Nazi era.

Greater Vienna (German: Groß-Wien) is the name given to a greatly enlarged Vienna that incorporates surrounding communities. The first attempts to create a Greater Vienna were made during the Habsburg monarchy. After the Anschluss of Austria into the German Reich in 1938, Vienna was expanded to become the "largest city in the Reich in terms of area".

Today, the term "Greater Vienna" mainly denotes the expanded Vienna that existed during the Nazi era, which was much larger than today's city, as most of these expansions were reversed in 1954 during the Allied occupation. The annexations of the National Socialist era still have an impact on the region's infrastructure today. Within the modern city, some of the district reorganization measures are still in force.

== Greater Vienna in the imperial era ==
The idea of Greater Vienna first emerged in the second half of the 19th century. Vienna's first major urban expansion took place in 1850. The Viennese suburbs, which lay within the Linienwall, were incorporated by Lower Austrian provincial law and divided into districts. In this way, the former city became the first district, and all the former suburbs became districts II to VIII (after the division of the IVth district: II to IX). Discussions then arose as to whether Vienna should be united with its suburbs to form a metropolis. The lawyer Leopold Florian Meißner submitted a petition to the Lower Austrian provincial committee on behalf of the suburb of Währing, in which he suggested the formation of Greater Vienna, which would incorporate the suburbs into the city. However, these proposals were rejected by the Vienna City Council. There were fears of high costs in the event of a further expansion of the city, as this would have meant an expansion of Vienna's water supply, for example. Furthermore, the city was reluctant to see the restless industrial proletariat of the suburbs as part of the Viennese population. Some suburbs also fought for their independence. On 30 September 1888, Emperor Franz Joseph I gave a speech on the occasion of the opening of the Türkenschanzpark in the then still independent city municipality of Währing. The speech was probably inspired by the Imperial and Royal Government of Count Eduard Taaffe and caused a stir, as the Emperor commented positively on the incorporation of the suburbs. As a result, the Lower Austrian provincial parliament decided to unite Vienna with the suburbs in 1890, despite objections. The law came into force on 1 January 1892. At this time, Vienna was experiencing brisk building activity and strong immigration. The vacant areas between the still unurbanized suburbs were soon filled in and the city center was given a new lease of life with prestigious public buildings. In 1898, the Austrian Illustrated Newspaper (German: Österreichische Illustrierte Zeitung) wrote:

"Greater Vienna has changed enormously in just a few decades. Narrow and winding alleys have been replaced by wide streets with magnificent palaces, and areas that were undeveloped just a few years ago now boast huge house complexes. The building activity is enormous and you will hardly find a street where the demolishers are not tearing down a piece of old Vienna to make way for a modern, magnificent building. In the so-called old districts, this disappearance of houses that have become dear to us is particularly noticeable ..."

At the beginning of the 20th century, Vienna reached the 2 million population mark for the first time. With the incorporation of the large municipality of Floridsdorf in 1904 – which the Stadtholder (German: Statthalter) of Lower Austria Count Erich Kielmansegg actually wanted to expand to become the future capital of Lower Austria – Vienna also expanded to the left (northern) bank of the Danube. During this time, the Vienna City Council drew up plans to expand the city into a Greater Vienna with a population of four million. In this context, the Municipal Regulatory Office was founded. It was estimated that the urban expansion would take around half a century, and the final boundaries were only vaguely defined. The first projects began to be implemented, but work had to be interrupted during the First World War and finally ended after the fall of the Habsburg monarchy in 1918. Vienna lost hundreds of thousands of inhabitants and any idea of a Greater Vienna had to be abandoned.

== "Greater Vienna" in the Nazi era ==
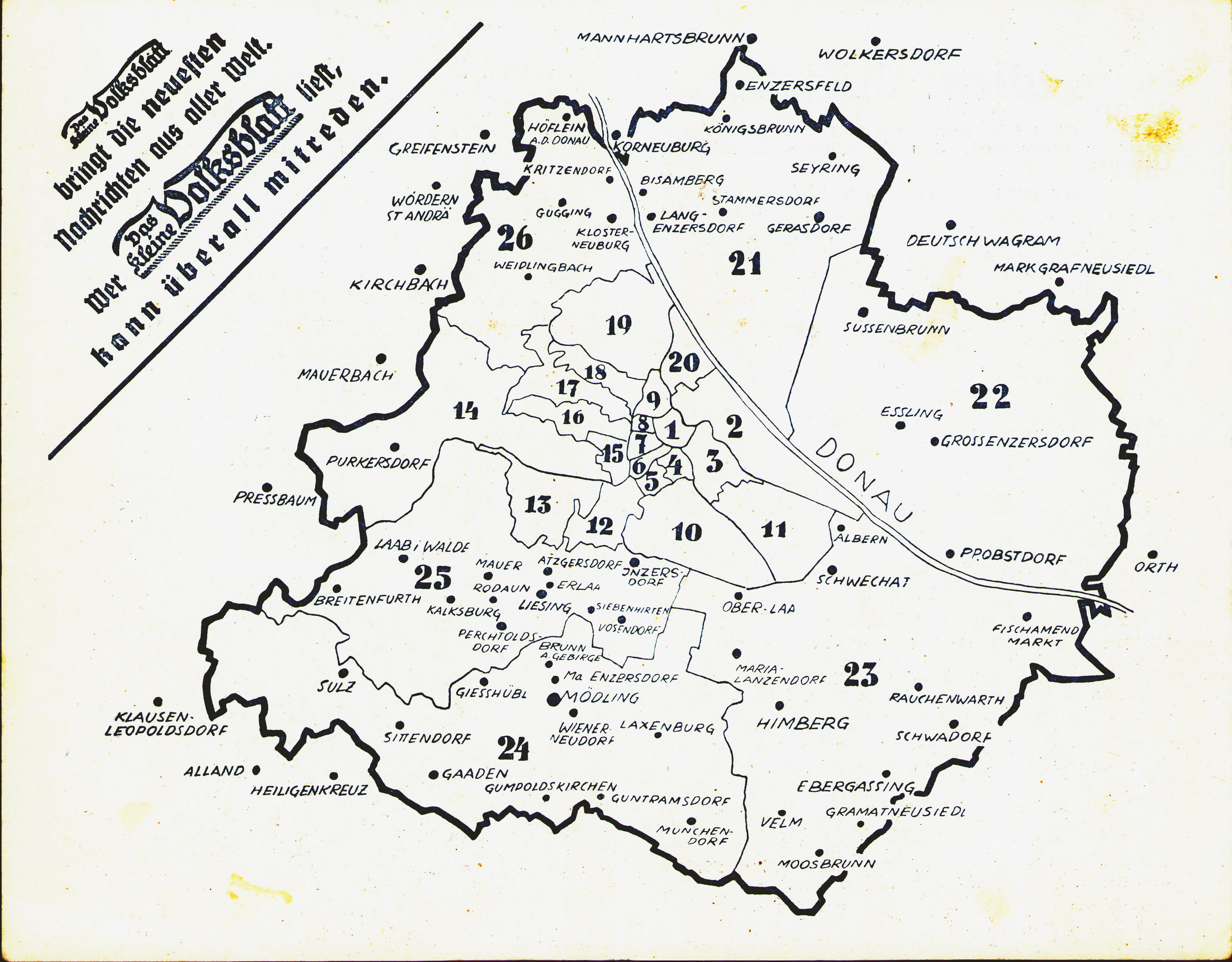
Places in Greater Vienna

After Austria's annexation to the German Reich on 13 March 1938, the new city administration was particularly interested in large-scale expansion plans. The National Socialist leadership therefore decided to announce the expansion of Vienna from the "second largest German city" to the "largest in terms of area" of the Reich, to Greater Vienna, in the extensive propaganda campaign for the referendum on the already completed annexation on 10 April 1938. In contrast to the "Führer city of Linz", Vienna was not a priority in the urban development program of the "Third Reich". At best, the city was to retain its claim to being the capital in the cultural sector. Nevertheless, Vienna's expansion was also planned from 1938 onwards. Among others, the Berlin architect Franz Pöcher was consulted. He envisaged extensive demolitions for the second District of Leopoldstadt, a district with a traditionally high Jewish population. In place of this densely built-up district, a huge party forum was planned between two parallel axes. This was also intended to fulfill Hitler's wish to bring the city closer to the Danube. The Ring Road was to be extended on both sides. Individual aspects of the National Socialist urban planning for Vienna were pursued until well after the Second World War, such as the idea of the Danube Island. In addition, there was a "reconstruction program" that provided for extensive structural alterations in Vienna. The driving force behind the Greater Vienna project was the then Mayor of Vienna, Hermann Neubacher, who had headed the "Non-profit settlement and building materials institute (German: Gemeinnützige Siedlungs- und Baustoffanstalt (Gesiba))" as Director General in "Red Vienna" from 1919 to 1934. After Adolf Hitler's speech at Vienna's Heroes' Square on 15 March 1938, the National Socialist city administration began working on plans to implement Vienna's large-scale territorial expansion, which was to be modeled on Greater Hamburg. On 23 April 1938, the Magistrate's Office drew up an act on the expansion of the territory and from May onwards, the individual administrative groups held discussions on the subject. In some cases, extremely far-reaching expansions were considered (up to 8500 km2), as far as the sources of the Viennese high spring water pipelines in the south and the Reich border in the east. In particular, the civil servants who had been taken over from earlier times spoke out against this, as Vienna would then have had to take over the sometimes high debts of the Lower Austrian municipalities, with particular reference being made to the completely different situation compared to Hamburg. Neubacher also encountered resistance from the Lower Austrian NSDAP offices.

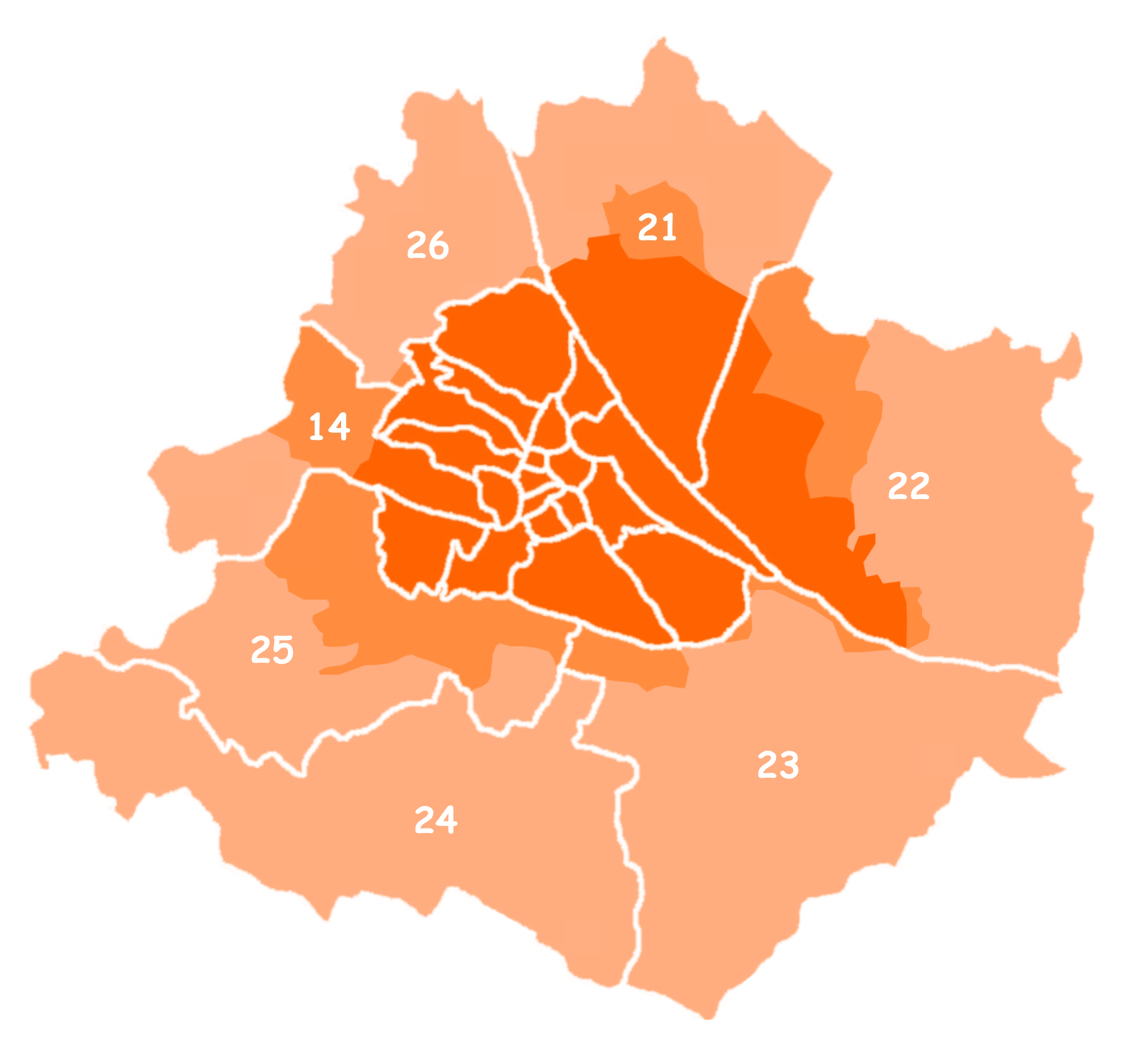
Map of Greater Vienna: City area within the old boundaries (dark orange) City area 1938–1954 (light orange) City area in today's boundaries (medium orange)

On 24 May, the incorporation of Fischamend, Klosterneuburg, Schwechat, Mödling and Hadersdorf-Weidlingau (today part of the 14th Viennese City District Penzing) was announced. The incorporation of Korneuburg and Deutsch Wagram was also planned, but this was abandoned. On 21 July 1938, the incorporation of 97 municipalities was determined and the corresponding law was presented on 2 September.

== See also ==
- Greater Berlin Act
- Greater Hamburg Act
