= Ernst Girzick =

SS Officer and Holocaust perpetrator

Ernst Adolf Girzick
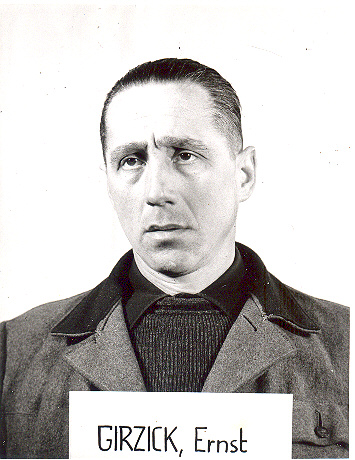
- Girzick in custody
- Born: 17 October 1911; Vienna, Austria-Hungary
- Died: 4 March 1977 (aged 65); Neumarkt am Wallersee, Salzburg, Austria
- Political party: Nazi Party
- Status: Deceased
- Conviction: Crimes against humanity
- Penalty: 15 years imprisonment
- SS career
- Allegiance: Nazi Germany
- Branch: Schutzstaffel
- Service years: 1942–1945
- Rank: SS-Obersturmführer
- Unit: RSHA IV B4
- Awards: War Merit Cross, 2nd class Blood Order

Ernst Adolf Girzick (17 October 1911 – 4 March 1977) was an Austrian SS-Obersturmführer and an employee in Referat IV B4 of the Reich Security Main Office (RSHA). Girzick was responsible for the deportation of Jews to concentration and extermination camps. After the war, he was convicted of crimes against humanity in Vienna and sentenced to 15 years in prison.

== Biography ==
Girzick, an electrical engineer, was unemployed after the completion of his professional training. He joined the Austrian Bundesheer in 1931, and also became a member of the German Soldiers Bund and the Nazi Party. After his discharge from the army in 1933, he was again unemployed. Girzick became involved in Nazi terrorist attacks involving the use of explosives in Austria. In January 1934, he was arrested after being caught in possession of explosives. Girzick was sentenced to 5.5 years in prison and imprisoned in Krems an der Donau. He was released due to an amnesty in July 1936, under the Juliabkommen. Following his release, Girzick moved to Germany and joined the Austrian Legion in the SS camp at Ranis. As of November 1937, he worked as a streetcar conductor in Dresden. After the Anschluss, Girzick received the Blood Order. After 1938, he worked first in the "Property Registration Office" of the Ministry of Economics in Vienna, but he soon moved to the Central Agency for Jewish Emigration in Vienna and remained there from 1939 as deputy to Alois Brunner, until March 1943. He was then in Prague as head of the main offices of the Central Office for the Settlement of the Jewish Question in Bohemia and Moravia. From March to December 1944, Girzick belonged to the Eichmann-Kommando in Budapest. The purpose of this group was to send Jews to their deaths in Auschwitz. He received the War Merit Cross Second Class. Then Girzick was reinstated in Prague until the war in Europe ended. On 5 May 1945, he fled Prague in a motorcade with Brunner and other RSHA staff.

== Post-war ==
In November 1946, Girzick was arrested by Austrian gendarmeries in Köstendorf for failing to register himself as a former member of the Nazi Party. Later that year, the Viennese People's Court initiated criminal proceedings against him for his wartime activities. Girzick was tried for his involvement in the deportation of Viennese Jews to Theresienstadt concentration camp and extermination camps. On 3 September 1948, Girzick was found guilty of crimes against human dignity and sentenced to 15 years in prison.

In the 1950s, the Austrian government started granting mass clemency to Nazi war criminals as a way to attract ex-Nazi voters. Minister of the Interior Oskar Helmer wrote a letter to Minister of Justice Josef Gerö, requesting clemency for numerous Nazi war criminals, including Girzick.

Dear friend!

In view of the approaching Christmas season, I would like to enclose a list of former National Socialists imprisoned in the Stein Prison for political offenses. The persons named appear to be suitable for inclusion in a Christmas amnesty due to their personal and family circumstances.

Best regards,

Oskar Helmer

To justify Girzick's release, Helmer claimed, "There is almost no personal guilt. The only offense he is charged with is that he was employed in the Jewish resettlement office. wife and 2 children. They live in the poorest conditions and therefore a pardon is urgently needed." On 18 December 1953, President Theodor Körner granted Girzick clemency, allowing him to serve the remainder of his sentence on probation. Girzick then lived in Seewalchen am Attersee. Nothing further is known about his life, other than that he died in 1977.

== Bibliography ==
- Hans Safrian: Eichmann und seine Gehilfen. Fischer, Frankfurt am Main 1995, ISBN 3-596-12076-4.
- Ernst Klee: Das Personenlexikon zum Dritten Reich: Wer war was vor und nach 1945. Fischer, Frankfurt am Main 2007. ISBN 978-3-596-16048-8. (Second revised edition)
- Jan Björn Potthast: Das jüdische Zentralmuseum der SS in Prag – Gegnerforschung und Völkermord im Nationalsozialismus. Campus, Munich 2002 ISBN 3-593-37060-3.
