= Austrian Legion =

Paramilitary organization

The Austrian Legion (Österreichische Legion) was a Nazi paramilitary group founded in 1933 from expatriate Austrian Nazis. Its members, mostly Sturmabteilung (SA), were trained in military camps in Bavaria, then armed in preparation for a potential invasion of Austria. Operating from 1933 to 1938, the Legion proved mostly ineffective and in some cases detrimental to Germany's interests in Austria.

== Formation ==
Following the deportation of Theodor Habicht from Austria in 1932, Habicht moved his headquarters into Bavaria, to continue organized Nazi activities in Austria.

On 19 June 1933, the government of Engelbert Dollfuss banned the Nazi Party in Austria. About 10,000 Nazis fled from arrest to Bavaria, where Habicht organized them into the Austrian Legion, based at Dachau. Joined by more emigres following the failed 1934 July Putsch, they soon numbered over 15,000. In Bavaria, the expatriates received military training from the Sturmabteilung (SA), Schutzstaffel (SS), and German Army and police. They were also given arms – 10,300 rifles and 360 machine guns.

The Austrian Legion was officially part of SA-Obergruppe VIII, designated "Austria". This Obergruppe was under the command of SA-Obergruppenführer Hermann Reschny.

The Legion was used in practice to cause concern in the Vienna government of military action from Bavaria and to smuggle Nazi propaganda into Austria. At this time, the Legion numbered over 14,000 and possessed over 1,500 motorcars and could reach the Austrian border in 24 hours. The threat the Legion posed was minimized, however, when the Legion was ordered to surrender its arms to the Wehrmacht following the Night of the Long Knives, Hitler's purge of the SA.

== Anschluss and disbanding ==
When the Anschluss came in March 1938, the Legion was blocked from participating by Josef Bürckel, Arthur Seyss-Inquart, and Heinrich Himmler.

The Legion paraded through Vienna on 2 April, and was totally disbanded two weeks later. Most of its members returned to Germany, while those who remained in Austria faced poor job prospects.

== Impact ==
In spite of the massive amount of support given them by Berlin, in 1935 receiving 24 million Reichsmark, the Austrian Legion had mixed success. Its members were often an object of ire for German and Austrian Germans for their lack of discipline in their violent and ill-advised agitation, especially against the Catholic Church. The Legion's activities, which amounted to state-sponsored terrorism in another sovereign state, also angered Benito Mussolini. The Vienna government began to worry less about the Legion following its disarmament, and from intercepted communiques that revealed that their fighting power had been overstated.

Mussolini assured the Dollfuss government in August 1933 that, in the event of any attack from Germany by the German government or the Austrian Legion, Italy would come to Austria's aid. Dollfuss, in response, agreed to a military convention with Italy.

== Notable members ==
- Alois Brunner
- Anton Burger
- Erwin Busta
- Karl Adolf Eichmann
- Ernst Girzick
- Franz Novak
- Walter Reder
- Otto Wächter
