= 1938 Austrian Anschluss referendum =

Vote regarding the 1938 German annexation of Austria

- 10 April 1938
- Do you agree with the reunification of Austria with the German Reich that was enacted on 13 March 1938 and do you vote for the party of our leader Adolf Hitler?
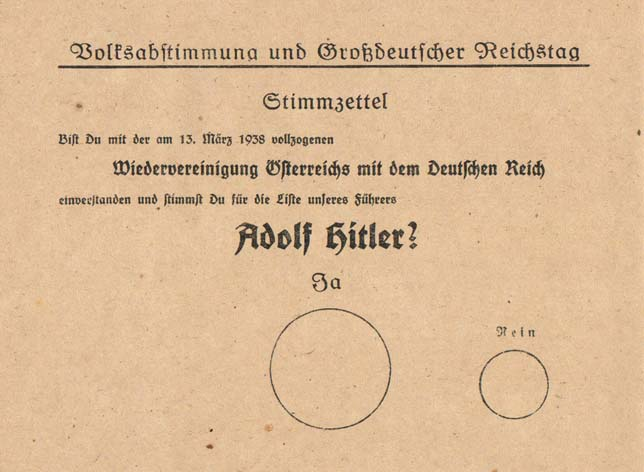
- Official ballot paper for the referendum

Results
Choice	Votes	%
Yes	4,453,912	99.73%
No	11,929	0.27%
Valid votes	4,465,841	99.87%
Invalid or blank votes	5,777	0.13%
Total votes	4,471,618	100.00%
Registered voters/turnout	4,484,617	99.71%

A sham referendum on the Anschluss with Germany was held in German-occupied Austria on 10 April 1938, alongside one in Germany. German troops had already occupied Austria one month earlier, on 12 March 1938. The official result was reported as 99.73% in favour, with a 99.71% turnout. The referendum was held post factum, after the Nazi government of Austria signed a law which proclaimed Austria "a land of the German Reich" and Adolf Hitler issued the "Law on the Reunification of Austria with the German Reich" on 13 March 1938, which de jure abolished Austria as a state.

The Austrian government had planned a referendum to assert its sovereignty for 13 March 1938, but Germany invaded Austria the day before in order to prevent the vote taking place.

Political enemies (communists, socialists, etc.) and Austrian citizens of Roma or Jewish origin—roughly 360,000 people or 8% of the Austrian population—were not allowed to vote in the plebiscite.

== Background ==
After the end of World War I, the newly founded Republic of German-Austria claimed sovereignty over the majority German-speaking territory of the former Habsburg empire. According to its provisional constitution it declared to be part of the also newly founded German Republic. Later plebiscites in Tyrol and Salzburg in 1921, where majorities of 98.77% and 99.11% voted for a unification with Germany, showed that it was also backed by the population.

In September 1919 German-Austria had to sign the Treaty of Saint Germain, which not only meant significant losses of territory, but also a forced change of name from "German-Austria" to "Austria". Furthermore, Article 88 of the treaty stated that "the independence of Austria is inalienable otherwise than with the consent of the Council of the League of Nations", to prevent any attempt to unite with Germany.

== Campaign ==
The referendum was supported by the Social Democratic Party of Austria, whose leader Karl Renner endorsed Adolf Hitler on 3 April 1938, and by Cardinal Theodor Innitzer, the highest representative of the Catholic Church in Austria, which meant that about two-thirds of Austrians could be counted on to vote for the Anschluss. Innitzer's role has been subject to debate. Whereas Catholic church historian Maximilian Liebmann has argued that the infamous declaration by the Austrian bishops of 18 March 1938 ("Feierliche Erklärung der österreichischen Bischöfe") was imposed upon them by Gauleiter Josef Bürckel, Catholic theologian Stefan Moritz emphasized that the Catholic clergy had unjustly portrayed themselves as victims after 1945. Indeed, Innitzer had agreed to meet Hitler on 15 March 1938 and hoped for concessions if the Austrian Catholic church would support the Nazis. Although Innitzer was summoned to Rome in early April 1938 and dressed down by pope Pius XI for this, he continued to negotiate with the new regime. Only when civil marriage was introduced in Austria on 1 August 1938 did Innitzer decide against further negotiations. He was the subject of assaults by Nazi supporters in October 1938.

== Conduct ==
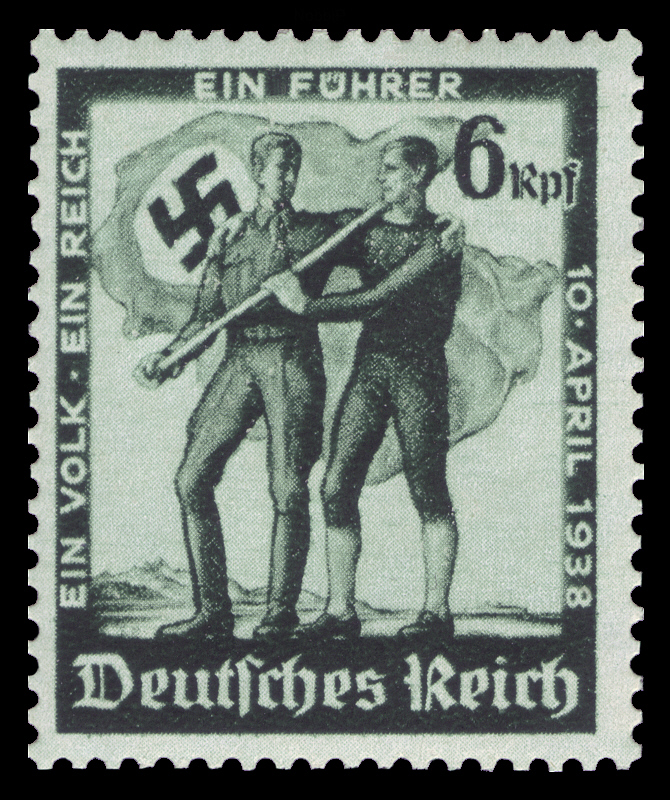
Postage stamp celebrating the referendum: an NSDAP member embraces an Austrian in national costume, and both fly the Nazi flag. The text reads: "One People, One Reich, One Leader — 10th April 1938."

Hitler's forces suppressed all opposition. Before the first German soldier crossed the border, Heinrich Himmler and a few Schutzstaffel (SS) officers landed in Vienna to arrest prominent representatives of the First Republic, such as Richard Schmitz, Leopold Figl, Friedrich Hillegeist, and Franz Olah. During the few weeks between the Anschluss and the plebiscite, authorities rounded up Social Democrats, Communists, other potential political dissenters, and Austrian Jews; within a few days of 12 March, they arrested 70,000 people. They were imprisoned or sent to concentration camps. The disused northwest railway station in Vienna was converted into a makeshift concentration camp.

Seeing this attack on opposition figures, American historian Evan Burr Bukey warned that the plebiscite result needed to be taken with "great caution".

The plebiscite was targeted with large-scale Nazi propaganda. The pro-Hitler forces achieved the abrogation of the voting rights of around 360,000 people (8% of the eligible voting population), mainly political enemies such as former members of now-prohibited left-wing parties and Austrian citizens of Jewish or Romani origin.

The ballots featured a large circle for "yes" votes and a small one for "no" votes, as a nudge to direct the vote. Several other claims were made that the vote was rigged. According to some Gestapo reports, only a quarter to a third of Austrian voters in Vienna were in favour of the Anschluss.

But the result in favour of Anschluss was "... the outcome of opportunism, ideological conviction, massive pressure, occasional vote rigging, and a propaganda machine that Austria's political culture had never before experienced." Voters were under heavy pressure to make a yes vote, including the fact that many marked the ballot paper in front of the campaign workers in order not to be suspected of voting against the Anschluss. The secrecy of the ballot was in practice non-existent. However, Life in 1938 claimed that the results of the referendum and its German counterpart were "largely honest".

== Results ==
The referendum question was:

Do you agree with the reunification of Austria with the German Reich that was enacted on 13 March 1938 and do you vote for the party of our leader Adolf Hitler? (Note: Bist Du mit der am 13. März vollzogenen Wiedervereinigung Österreichs mit dem Deutschen Reich einverstanden und stimmst Du für die Liste unseres Führers Adolf Hitler?)

The officially published results showed 99.73% of voters in favour.

Choice	Votes	%
For	4,453,912	99.73
Against	11,929	0.27
Total	4,465,841	100.00
Valid votes	4,465,841	99.87
Invalid/blank votes	5,777	0.13
Total votes	4,471,618	100.00
Registered voters/turnout	4,484,617	99.71
Source: Direct Democracy

== Aftermath ==
After the referendum's "approval", Austria was integrated into Nazi Germany, and was made into several administrative divisions in Germany.

== See also ==
- 1935 Saar status referendum

== Sources ==
- Bukey, Evan Burr (2000). Hitler's Austria : popular sentiment in the Nazi era, 1938-1945. Chapel Hill, N.C.: University of North Carolina Press. ISBN 0807853631.
- Gellately, Robert; Stoltzfus, Nathan (2001). Social Outsiders in Nazi Germany. Princeton University Press. ISBN 0-691-08684-2.
- Evans, Richard J. (2006). The Third Reich in Power, 1933-1939. Penguin Books. ISBN 978-0-14-100976-6. OL 28433980M.
- Knaur, Peter (1951). The International Relations of Austria and the Anschluss 1931–1938. University of Wyoming.
