= Kollerschlag =

- Municipality
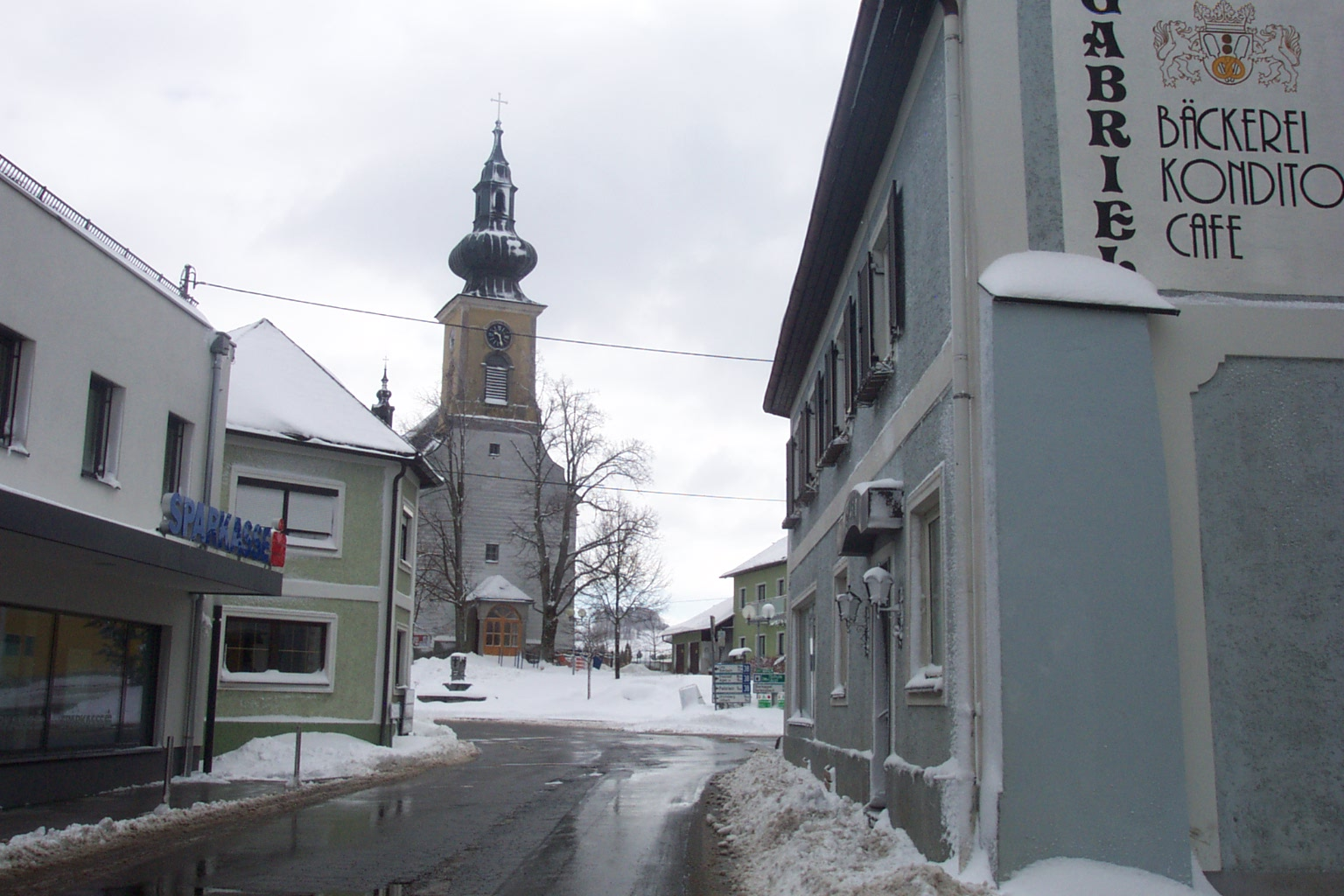

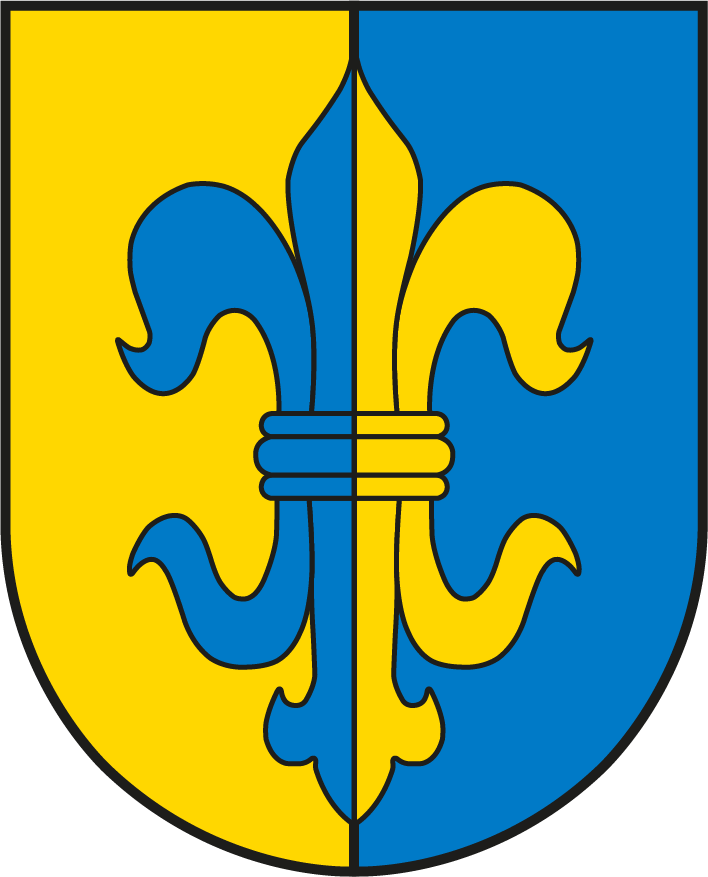
- Coat of arms

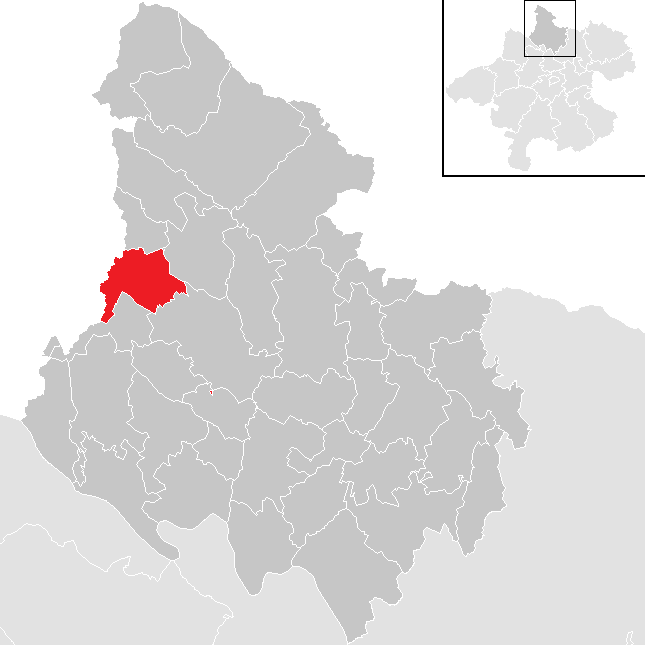
- Location in the district

- Location within Austria
- Coordinates: 48°36′21″N 13°50′34″E
- Country: Austria
- State: Upper Austria
- District: Rohrbach

Government
  - Mayor: Johannes Resch (SPÖ)

Area
  - Total: 17.46 km^{2} (6.74 sq mi)
- Elevation: 726 m (2,382 ft)

Population (2025-01-01)
  - Total: 1,542
  - Density: 88.32/km^{2} (228.7/sq mi)
- Time zone: UTC+1 (CET)
  - Summer (DST): UTC+2 (CEST)
- Postal code: 4154
- Area code: 07287
- Vehicle registration: RO
- Website: www.kollerschlag.at

Kollerschlag is a municipality in the district of Rohrbach in the Austrian state of Upper Austria.

In July 1934, Kollerschlag made headlines with a failed Putsch. After 30 to 40 men from the Austrian Legion approached the border to free the way for 500 fellow fighters who were operating in Bavaria, thirty went to Kollerschlag, where they hoisted a Swastika flag and killed a police officer. After two rebels were killed as well, and at least five others were wounded, the SA troopers hurried back to Bavaria. One of them was Robert Haider, who had fled there after an anti-Jewish action in 1933.

== Population ==
Historical population
| Year | Pop. | ±% |
|---|---|---|
| 1869 | 1,340 | — |
| 1880 | 1,301 | −2.9% |
| 1890 | 1,274 | −2.1% |
| 1900 | 1,230 | −3.5% |
| 1910 | 1,222 | −0.7% |
| 1923 | 1,162 | −4.9% |
| 1934 | 1,165 | +0.3% |
| 1939 | 839 | −28.0% |
| 1951 | 1,188 | +41.6% |
| 1961 | 1,250 | +5.2% |
| 1971 | 1,343 | +7.4% |
| 1981 | 1,434 | +6.8% |
| 1991 | 1,415 | −1.3% |
| 2001 | 1,533 | +8.3% |
| 2011 | 1,505 | −1.8% |
| 2017 | 1,511 | +0.4% |
| 2025 | 1,542 | +2.1% |
