= 2008 Austrian government formation =

This article covers the formation of the Faymann cabinet following the 2008 parliamentary election in Austria.

== Background ==
President Heinz Fischer gave Werner Faymann the mandate to form a government on 8 October 2008. At the same time, Pröll stated he was still seeking talks with all other parties.

Potential governments

- A ÖVP–SPÖ coalition (108 seats).
  - Similar governments already existed at National level in the First Republic in 1920–21 (CS–SPÖ) and in the second Republic the classical coalition.
- A right-wing ÖVP–FPÖ–BZÖ coalition (106 seats).
  - Similar governments already existed at National level in the First Republic in 1921–26 (CS–GDVP), in 1926–31 (CS–GDVP–LB), in 1931–32 (CS–LB) and in 1932–34 (CS–LB–HB) and in the second Republic in 2000–2005 (ÖVP–FPÖ) and 2005–06 (ÖVP–BZÖ).
  - Proposed by Strache and Haider, if the ÖVP wants it.
- A SPÖ–BZÖ–Greens coalition (98 seats).
  - Proposed by Haider, but Glawischnig ruled out a coalition with the BZÖ or the FPÖ and Faymann ruled out a coalition with the BZÖ and the FPÖ.
- A ÖVP–BZÖ–Greens coalition (92 seats).
  - Pröll and Haider expressed their interest for this coalition, but Glawischnig stated the Greens would under no circumstances be part of a coalition which included the FPÖ or the BZÖ.

Due to the 2008 financial crisis, Pröll on 13 October 2008 called for an ÖVP leadership meeting on 14 October 2008 to decide to start coalition negotiations with the SPÖ. Before the leadership meeting, all five parliamentary parties met for a so-called Österreich-Gespräch ("Austria talk") proposed by the ÖVP, in which they tried to find common ground on possible legislative issues which would require a two-thirds majority; the parties' leaders talked mostly about the 2008 financial crisis and agreed to continue the Österreich-Gespräch at a later date. The ÖVP leadership meeting voted 22 to 4 in favour of opening coalition negotiations, and the first main meeting was held on 20 October 2008. Immediately afterwards, discussion in the negotiation teams started. The composition of the negotiation teams was announced on 16 October 2008:

Party	EU and foreign policy	finance and taxes	women and families	security	education and schools	social issues and health	administrative and constitutional issues	economy
SPÖ	Andreas Schieder	Christoph Matznetter	Barbara Prammer	Norbert Darabos	Claudia Schmied	Wilhelm Haberzettl	Hans Niessl	Doris Bures
ÖVP	Ursula Plassnik	Wilhelm Molterer	Christine Marek	Maria Fekter	Johannes Hahn	Fritz Neugebauer	Herbert Sausgruber	Karlheinz Kopf

Reportedly, the SPÖ was seeking to trade the justice ministry for the health ministry, with justice minister Berger returning to the European Parliament and Upper Austrian SPÖ leader Erich Haider becoming health minister. Other rumours included Bures becoming infrastructure minister and trade unionist Wolfgang Katzian becoming social minister. Darabos and Schmied were seen as retaining their offices, with Darabos reportedly waiting for the right time to take over as governor of Burgenland from Niessl. Pröll was seen as certain to take over a more high-profile ministry (finance, interior or foreign affairs) with foreign affairs seen as the most likely. Fekter would most certainly remain interior minister or become justice minister; Hahn was also seen as staying in office, and general-secretary of the Österreichischer Wirtschaftsbund (Austrian SME Union or Austrian Business Federation, one of the constituent federations of the ÖVP) Karlheinz Kopf was considered likely to take over as economics minister. State secretary Marek was rumoured to be promoted to minister in a "generations ministry" (encompassing youth, family and pensioners' issues), and Josef Stockinger, the Upper Austrian agriculture state councillor, was seen as the most likely candidate to become agriculture minister. The second main meeting was held on 30 October 2008; both parties reiterated that they were trying to finish the coalition negotiations as quickly as possible. On 4 November 2008, Pröll agreed to compromise on the SPÖ's demands to have a tax reform as early as 2009 instead of in 2010. On 6 November 2008, the SPÖ and the ÖVP agreed on the time (by March 2009) and volume (€2.7 billions) of the tax reform, clearing the way for another grand coalition.

Erich Haider later rejected the possibility of becoming health minister, but the SPÖ was reportedly still interested in swapping the justice ministry to gain the health ministry in the new government.

After a meeting between Faymann and Pröll on 16 November 2008, the ÖVP claimed there were still a number of open questions left to be resolved before it would decide on whether to enter into another grand coalition; the SPÖ then answered the ten open questions in writing on 17 November 2008. Pröll's demands were generally seen as a publicity stunt and were assumed to be likely to hurt his standing.

According to a report from 19 November 2008, it was seen as certain that Bures would become infrastructure minister, Schmied and Darabos would stay on in their current ministries, ÖGB president Rudolf Hundstorfer would become social and labour minister (taking over the labour agenda from the economics ministry), Schieder would remain state secretary and that either the chairman of the Upper Austrian Regional Health Insurance (Oberösterreichischen Gebietskrankenkasse) Alois Stöger or the finance city councillor of Linz Johann Mayr would become health minister. Lower Austrian state councillor Gabriele Heinisch-Hosek was seen as the most likely women's minister, with Styrian MP Elisabeth Grossmann also a possibility. Depending on which ministry Pröll would choose (foreign and European affairs, economy or finance, with the latter seen as the most likely), the ÖVP's ministers could change, but it was assumed that Fekter would continue as interior minister or become justice minister, in which case Lower Austrian state councillor Johanna Mikl-Leitner would likely become interior minister. Hahn would stay on as science minister, either president of the farmer's alliance (Bauernbund) Fritz Grillitsch or Upper Austrian agriculture state councillor Josef Stockinger would become agriculture minister and Plassnik would stay on as foreign and European affairs minister. One of the most important negotiators on Pröll's side, Karl-Heinz Kopf, would likely become chief of the parliamentary party, and Reinhold Mitterlehner would most likely become economics minister. The SPÖ's proposal to have two state secretaries (one each from the SPÖ and the ÖVP) for governmental coordination was seen as unresolved, but unlikely to be accepted by the ÖVP.

== Approval ==
The coalition negotiations were reported to end on 23 November 2008, with the leadership committees of the SPÖ and the ÖVP expected to approve the deal in the following week. In the final days of the negotiations, the SPÖ was strongly criticised for giving the ÖVP control of both the interior and the justice ministry, and for making the same mistakes it made two years earlier in leaving multiple important ministries in the hands of the ÖVP while having far fewer competences itself. As expected, the coalition was agreed upon on 23 November 2008, with the following ministry changes from the Gusenbauer cabinet:

- sports were moved from the chancellor's office to the defence ministry;
- social issues were moved from the economics ministry to the labour ministry;
- family issues were moved from the health ministry to the economics ministry;
- the number of state secretaries was reduced by two, instead of six secretaries (SPÖ: chancellor's office, finance, infrastructure; ÖVP: chancellor's office (sports), foreign affairs, economics) there are now four (SPÖ: chancellor's office, finance; ÖVP: finance, economics)
- the justice ministry was moved to the ÖVP, the health ministry to the SPÖ.

Ministers were expected to be announced on 24 November 2008, and the government was expected to be sworn in on 2 December 2008. In the EU referendums question, a compromise was achieved which stated that none of the two parties was allowed to call for a referendum on EU questions without the other party's approval; reportedly, this weakly worded compromise was one of the reasons why foreign minister Ursula Plassnik left the government. Ministry changes for the SPÖ were Doris Bures as infrastructure minister, Rudolf Hundstorfer as social minister, chairman of the Upper Austrian Regional Health Insurance Alois Stöger as health minister, Lower Austrian state councillor Gabriele Heinisch-Hosek as women's minister, Andreas Schieder as state secretary in the finance ministry and Josef Ostermayer (Faymann's former cabinet chief) as state secretary in the chancellor's office. Bures was replaced as Bundesgeschäftsführerin by Laura Rudas and Günther Kräuter. As for the ÖVP, rumours spoke of judge Claudia Bandion-Ortner as justice minister, second president of the National Council Michael Spindelegger as foreign minister, secretary-general of the Österreichischer Sparkassenverband (association of savings banks) Michael Ikrath as finance minister or former Styrian economics state councillor Herbert Paierl as economics minister, depending on which office Pröll took; senior executive president of Investkredit Wilfried Stadler was the most likely name for the state secretary in the finance ministry, if Pröll became finance minister. As expected, Fekter remained interior minister, Hahn stayed on as science minister and Spindelegger became foreign minister, as Pröll took over the finance ministry. Judge Claudia Bandion-Ortner (well-known to the public from the Konsum and BAWAG cases) became non-party justice minister, deputy president of the Austrian Federal Economic Chamber Reinhold Mitterlehner became economics minister and Burgenland state councillor Niki Berlakovich became agriculture minister. The state secretary positions were filled by incumbent state secretaries: Reinhold Lopatka switched from state secretary for sports in the chancellor's office to state secretary in the finance ministry, while Christine Marek stayed on as state secretary in the economics ministry with her field of duties changing from labour to families and youth.

The steering committees of both the SPÖ (unanimously) and the ÖVP (three votes against from Styrian party leader Hermann Schützenhöfer, Carinthian party leader Josef Martinz and the outgoing economics minister Martin Bartenstein) approved the coalition deal on 24 November 2008. Erich Foglar, chief of the union Metals–Textiles–Food, was announced as Hundstorfer's successor as ÖGB president on 24 November 2008, and the ÖVP announced Karlheinz Kopf as their new chief of the parliamentary party and unionist Fritz Neugebauer as their nominee for the post of second president of the National Council on 25 November 2008. Director of the Farmers' Alliance (Bauernbund) Fritz Kaltenegger replaced Hannes Missethon as ÖVP secretary-general.

On 27 November 2008, it was announced that Bandion-Ortner would not be sworn in on 2 December 2008, as she had yet to finalise the verdict in the BAWAG case before becoming justice minister and a bout of flu kept her from doing in the few remaining days; science minister Hahn would instead be sworn in as interim justice minister for at most four weeks before she would take over. The chancellor, the vice-chancellor, the other ministers and the state secretaries were sworn in as planned on 2 December 2008. Bandion-Ortner was to be sworn in on 15 January 2009 after finalising the verdict on 31 December 2008.
