= Barbara Prammer =

Austrian politician (1954–2014)

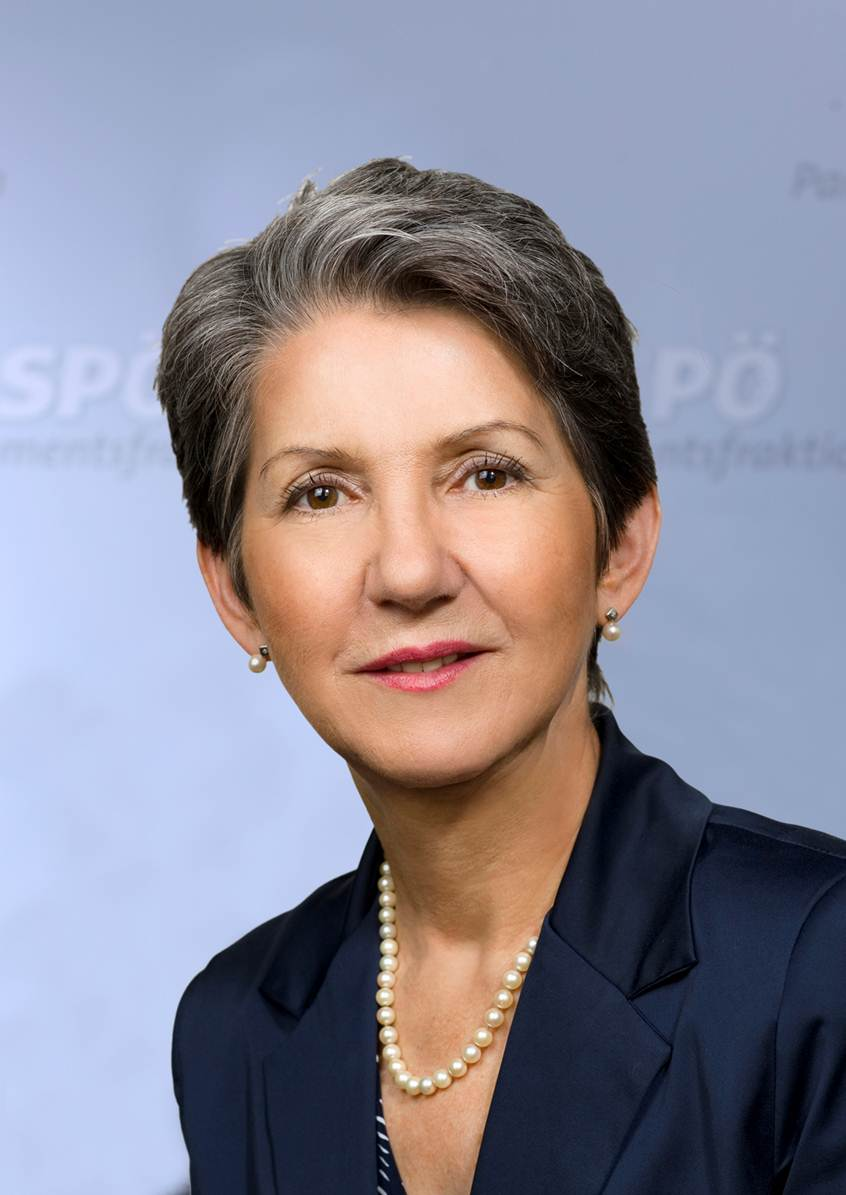
- Prammer in 2014

President of the National Council
- In office 30 October 2006 – 2 August 2014
- Preceded by: Andreas Khol
- Succeeded by: Doris Bures

Federal Minister for Women Affairs and Consumer Protection
- In office 28 January 1997 – 4 February 2000
- Chancellor: Viktor Klima
- Preceded by: Helga Konrad
- Succeeded by: Elisabeth Sickl

Personal details
- Born: 11 January 1954 Ottnang am Hausruck, Upper Austria
- Died: 2 August 2014 (aged 60) Vienna, Austria
- Party: Social Democratic Party of Austria
- Education: Johannes Kepler University Linz

Barbara Prammer (née Thaller; 11 January 1954 – 2 August 2014) was an Austrian politician and member of the Social Democratic Party of Austria (SPÖ). In 2006 she was the first woman to become President of the National Council of Austria, an office she held until her death.

== Biography ==
Prammer was born in the Upper Austrian market town of Ottnang am Hausruck, where she began her career as a local government official. From 1978 she studied sociology at the Johannes Kepler University Linz, obtaining a Magister's degree in 1986. She worked as a qualified vocational and social education worker and head of the department of women's affairs at the employment agency in Linz.

In 1990 she was elected president of the SPÖ women's organisation in Upper Austria and became deputy and vice-president of the Upper Austrian state legislature (Landtag) one year later. From 1995 until 1997 she served as a member of the Upper Austrian state government in the office of a minister (Landesrat) for housing and nature conservation.

In 1995 Prammer joined the SPÖ party executive on federal level as a vice-chair. Two years later Chancellor Viktor Klima appointed her Federal Minister for Women Affairs and Consumer Protection. A strong proponent of affirmative action in gender equality politics, she held the office until after the 1999 Austrian legislative election the Klima cabinet was succeeded by the right-wing ÖVP-FPÖ coalition government of Wolfgang Schüssel, she became vice chairwoman of the SPÖ parliamentary group (Klub) in the National Council parliament.

On 16 June 2004 Prammer was elected vice president of the National Council and upon the 2006 legislative election succeeded Andreas Khol as president, re-elected twice in 2008 and 2013. During her term, she took a stand for parliamentary minority rights and towards the culture of remembrance concerning the Austrian Nazi past.

Though she had publicly unveiled her cancerous condition in September 2013, she announced to carry on official duties, temporarily represented by her deputy Fritz Neugebauer. Barbara Prammer died of pancreatic cancer on 2 August 2014 at the age of 60. A state funeral in her honour was held on 9 August, attended by Austrian President Heinz Fischer, Chancellor Werner Faymann, and Minister Gabriele Heinisch-Hosek, as well as by editors like Barbara Coudenhove-Kalergi and numerous European speakers of parliament like Norbert Lammert, Guido Westerwelle, Josip Leko, Ranko Krivokapić, Ulrike Lunacek, Katalin Szili, and Pia Locatelli. Prammer was cremated at Feuerhalle Simmering and her ashes buried in Vienna Central Cemetery.

Prammer was married (1980–2001) and had two children.

== Honours ==
- Grand Decoration of Honour in Gold with Sash for Services to the Republic of Austria (2000)
- In 2014, she received a membership of the legion of honor as a Commandeur de la Légion d'Honneur (C. LH) for her merits as a women's rights advocate and her role in implementing democratic values
- 1st Class / Knights Grand Cross Order of the Order of Merit of the Italian Republic (2007)

== See also ==
- List of members of the Austrian Parliament who died in office
