= First Faymann government =

First cabinet under Werner Faymann

- 27th government of Austria

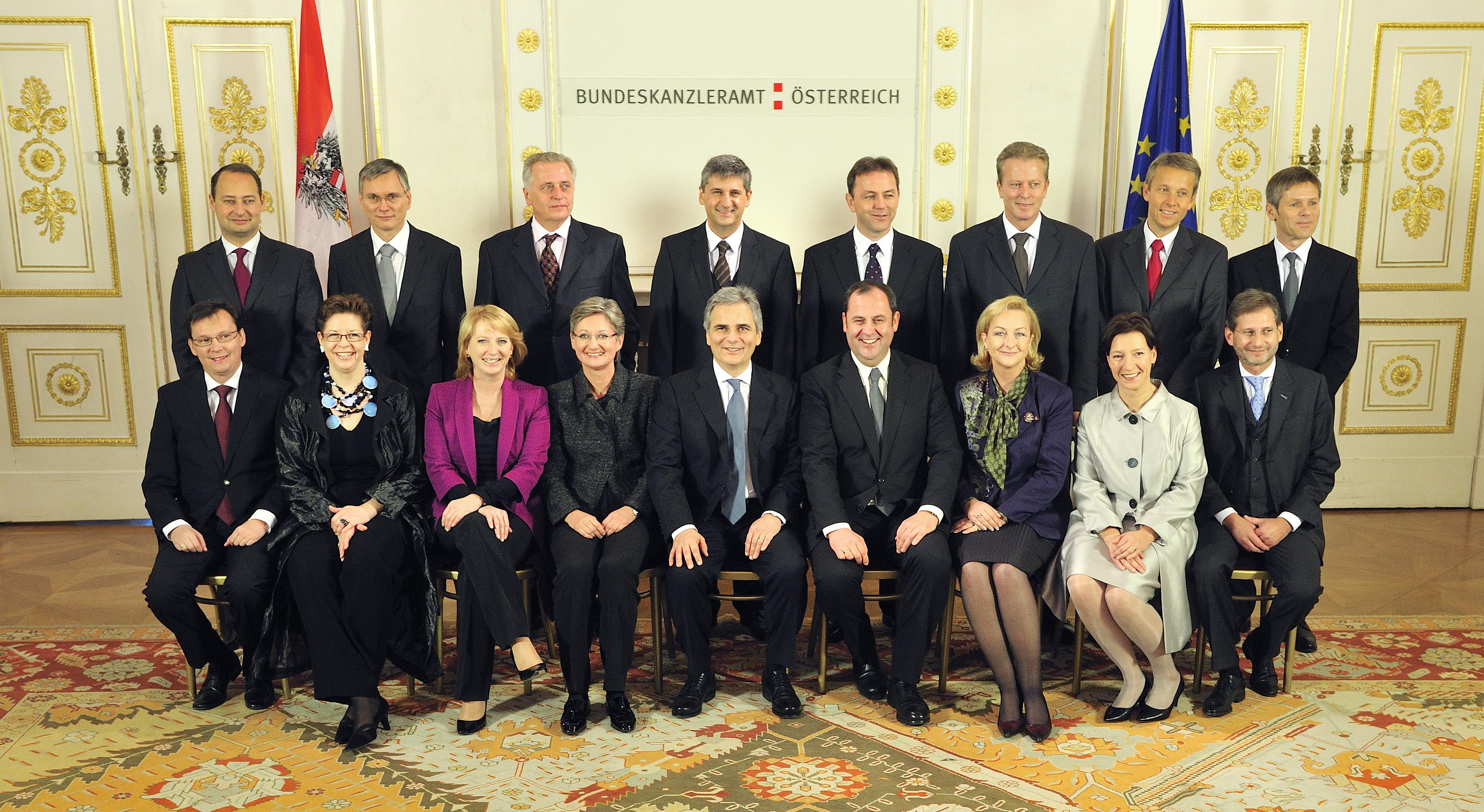
- Swearing-in of the First Faymann government
- Date formed: 2 December 2008
- Date dissolved: 16 December 2013

People and organisations
- Appointed by: Heinz Fischer
- Chancellor: Werner Faymann
- Vice-Chancellor: Michael Spindelegger
- Member parties: Social Democratic Party of Austria (SPÖ); Austrian People's Party (ÖVP)
- Status in legislature: Grand coalition
- No. of ministers: 17
- Opposition parties: Freedom Party of Austria (FPÖ); Alliance for the Future of Austria (BZÖ); The Greens (GRÜNE)
- Opposition leader: Heinz-Christian Strache

History
- Election(s): 2008 election
- Predecessor: Gusenbauer government
- Successor: Second Faymann government

The first government of Werner Faymann was sworn in on December 2, 2008. Following the resignation of Vice Chancellor and ÖVP party chairman Josef Pröll from all political functions, a cabinet reshuffle took place. The new government members were sworn in by the President of Austria on 21 April 2011. The first Faymann government was succeeded by the Second Faymann government on December 16, 2013.

== Composition ==
Portfolio	Minister	Took office	Left office	Party
Federal Chancellery
Federal Chancellor	Werner Faymann	2 December 2008	16 December 2013	SPÖ
Vice-Chancellor	Josef Pröll	2 December 2008	21 April 2011	ÖVP
Vice-Chancellor	Michael Spindelegger	21 April 2011	16 December 2013	ÖVP
Minister for Women and Civil Service	Gabriele Heinisch-Hosek	2 December 2008	16 December 2013	SPÖ
Secretary of State for Media and Government Coordination	Josef Ostermayer	2 December 2008	16 December 2013	SPÖ
Federal Ministry for European and International Affairs
Minister for European and International Affairs	Michael Spindelegger	2 December 2008	16 December 2013	ÖVP
Secretary of State	Wolfgang Waldner	21 April 2011	22 August 2012	ÖVP
Secretary of State	Reinhold Lopatka	11 September 2012	16 December 2013	ÖVP
Ministry of Finance
Minister of Finance	Josef Pröll	2 December 2008	21 April 2011	ÖVP
Minister of Finance	Maria Fekter	21 April 2011	16 December 2013	ÖVP
Secretary of State	Andreas Schieder	2 December 2008	16 December 2013	SPÖ
Secretary of State	Reinhold Lopatka	2 December 2008	21 April 2011	ÖVP
Federal Ministry for Agriculture, Forestry, Environment and Water Management
Minister for Agriculture, Forestry, Environment and Water Management	Nikolaus Berlakovich	2 December 2008	16 December 2013	ÖVP
Federal Ministry of Defence and Sports
Minister for Defence and Sports	Norbert Darabos	2 December 2008	11 March 2013	SPÖ
Minister for Defence and Sports	Gerald Klug	11 March 2013	16 December 2013	SPÖ
Federal Ministry of Economy, Family and Youth
Minister for Economy, Family and Youth	Reinhold Mitterlehner	2 December 2008	16 December 2013	ÖVP
Secretary of State for Family and Youth	Christine Marek	2 December 2008	26 November 2010	ÖVP
Secretary of State for Family and Youth	Verena Remler	26 November 2010	21 April 2011	ÖVP
Federal Ministry of Education, Arts and Culture
Minister for Education, Arts and Culture	Claudia Schmied	2 December 2008	16 December 2013	SPÖ
Federal Ministry for Health
Minister for Health	Alois Stöger	2 December 2008	16 December 2013	SPÖ
Federal Ministry of the Interior
Minister for the Interior	Maria Fekter	2 December 2008	21 April 2011	ÖVP
Minister for the Interior	Johanna Mikl-Leitner	21 April 2011	16 December 2013	ÖVP
Secretary of State for Integration	Sebastian Kurz	21 April 2011	16 December 2013	ÖVP
Federal Ministry of Justice
Minister of Justice	Johannes Hahn	2 December 2008	15 January 2009	ÖVP
Minister of Justice	Claudia Bandion-Ortner (Note: Although formally independent, Karlheinz Töchterle and Claudia Bandion-Ortner have been part of the ÖVP's government team)	15 January 2009	21 April 2011	Independent
Minister of Justice	Beatrix Karl	21 April 2011	16 December 2013	ÖVP
Ministry of Labour, Social Affairs and Consumer Protection
Minister for Labour, Social Affairs and Consumer Protection	Rudolf Hundstorfer	2 December 2008	16 December 2013	SPÖ
Ministry for Transport, Innovation and Technology
Minister for Transport, Innovation and Technology	Doris Bures	2 December 2008	16 December 2013	SPÖ
Federal Ministry of Science and Research
Minister for Science and Research	Johannes Hahn	2 December 2008	26 January 2010	ÖVP
Minister for Science and Research	Beatrix Karl	26 January 2010	21 April 2011	ÖVP
Minister for Science and Research	Karlheinz Töchterle	21 April 2011	16 December 2013	Independent
