= Vorarlberg South (National Council electoral district) =

Parliamentary electoral district in Austria

- Vorarlberg Süd
- Electoral District for the National Council
- Location of Vorarlberg South within Austria
- District: List: Bludenz; Feldkirch
- State: Vorarlberg
- Population: 178,682 (2024)
- Electorate: 121,470 (2019)
- Area: 1,566 km^{2} (2023)

Current Electoral District
- Created: 1994
- Seats: List: 4 (2002–present); 3 (1994–2002)
- Members: Karlheinz Kopf (ÖVP)

Vorarlberg South (German: Vorarlberg Süd), also known as Electoral District 8B (German: Wahlkreis 8B), is one of the 39 multi-member regional electoral districts of the National Council, the lower house of the Austrian Parliament, the national legislature of Austria. The electoral district was created in 1992 when electoral regulations were amended to add regional electoral districts to the existing state-wide electoral districts and came into being at the following legislative election in 1994. It consists of the districts of Bludenz and Feldkirch in the state of Vorarlberg. The electoral district currently elects four of the 183 members of the National Council using the open party-list proportional representation electoral system. At the 2019 legislative election the constituency had 121,470 registered electors.

== History ==
Vorarlberg South was one 43 regional electoral districts (regionalwahlkreise) established by the "National Council Electoral Regulations 1992" (Nationalrats-Wahlordnung 1992) passed by the National Council in 1992. It consisted of the districts of Bludenz and Feldkirch in the state of Vorarlberg. The district was initially allocated three seats in May 1993. Electoral regulations require the allocation of seats amongst the electoral districts to be recalculated following each national census and in September 2002 the number of seats allocated to Vorarlberg South was increased to four based on the population as at the 2001 national census.

== Electoral system ==
Vorarlberg South currently elects four of the 183 members of the National Council using the open party-list proportional representation electoral system. The allocation of seats is carried out in three stages. In the first stage, seats are allocated to parties (lists) at the regional level using a state-wide Hare quota (wahlzahl) (valid votes in the state divided by the number of seats in the state). In the second stage, seats are allocated to parties at the state/provincial level using the state-wide Hare quota (any seats won by the party at the regional stage are subtracted from the party's state seats). In the third and final stage, seats are allocated to parties at the federal/national level using the D'Hondt method (any seats won by the party at the regional and state stages are subtracted from the party's federal seats). Only parties that reach the 4% national threshold, or have won a seat at the regional stage, compete for seats at the state and federal stages.

Electors may cast one preferential vote for individual candidates at the regional, state and federal levels. Split-ticket voting (panachage), or voting for more than one candidate at each level, is not permitted and will result in the ballot paper being invalidated. At the regional level, candidates must receive preferential votes amounting to at least 14% of the valid votes cast for their party to over-ride the order of the party list (10% and 7% respectively for the state and federal levels). Prior to April 2013 electors could not cast preferential votes at the federal level and the thresholds candidates needed to over-ride the party list order were higher at the regional level (half the Hare quota or 1/6 of the party votes) and state level (Hare quota).

== Election results ==
=== Summary ===
Election	Communists KPÖ+ / KPÖ			Social Democrats SPÖ			Greens GRÜNE			NEOS NEOS / LiF			People's ÖVP			Freedom FPÖ		
Election	Votes	%	Seats	Votes	%	Seats	Votes	%	Seats	Votes	%	Seats	Votes	%	Seats	Votes	%	Seats
2019	416	0.50%	0	11,167	13.53%	0	14,920	18.07%	0	11,478	13.90%	0	29,256	35.43%	1	12,379	14.99%	0
2017	619	0.71%	0	16,250	18.57%	0	6,430	7.35%	0	8,110	9.27%	0	29,048	33.20%	1	21,929	25.06%	0
2013	410	0.52%	0	10,926	13.97%	0	13,542	17.32%	0	10,677	13.65%	0	19,219	24.57%	0	15,534	19.86%	0
2008	499	0.60%	0	12,536	15.19%	0	14,521	17.60%	0	2,084	2.53%	0	24,238	29.37%	1	13,357	16.19%	0
2006	468	0.60%	0	15,637	20.14%	0	12,697	16.35%	0				31,164	40.14%	1	7,818	10.07%	0
2002	390	0.44%	0	18,988	21.64%	0	12,794	14.58%	0	1,424	1.62%	0	41,495	47.28%	1	11,390	12.98%	0
1999	167	0.22%	0	14,972	19.84%	0	7,648	10.13%	0	3,456	4.58%	0	25,523	33.82%	1	22,573	29.91%	0
1995	179	0.22%	0	19,729	24.40%	0	5,963	7.37%	0	5,584	6.91%	0	26,556	32.84%	1	21,862	27.04%	0
1994				15,971	22.62%	0	6,230	8.82%	0	4,443	6.29%	0	25,703	36.40%	1	16,389	23.21%	0

=== Detailed ===
==== 2010s ====
===== 2019 =====
Results of the 2019 legislative election held on 29 September 2019:

Party		Votes per district			Total votes	%	Seats
Party		Blu- denz	Feld- kirch	Voting card	Total votes	%	Seats
Austrian People's Party	ÖVP	11,789	17,413	54	29,256	35.43%	1
The Greens – The Green Alternative	GRÜNE	4,470	10,313	137	14,920	18.07%	0
Freedom Party of Austria	FPÖ	4,981	7,378	20	12,379	14.99%	0
NEOS – The New Austria and Liberal Forum	NEOS	3,958	7,481	39	11,478	13.90%	0
Social Democratic Party of Austria	SPÖ	4,884	6,260	23	11,167	13.53%	0
JETZT	JETZT	590	1,160	9	1,759	2.13%	0
Der Wandel	WANDL	261	482	6	749	0.91%	0
My Vote Counts!	GILT	126	315	0	441	0.53%	0
KPÖ Plus	KPÖ+	188	225	3	416	0.50%	0
Valid Votes		31,247	51,027	291	82,565	100.00%	1
Rejected Votes		271	395	3	669	0.80%	
Total Polled		31,518	51,422	294	83,234	68.52%	
Registered Electors		45,458	76,012		121,470		
Turnout		69.33%	67.65%		68.52%		

The following candidates were elected:

- Personal mandates - Karlheinz Kopf (ÖVP), 4,509 votes.

===== 2017 =====
Results of the 2017 legislative election held on 15 October 2017:

Party		Votes per district			Total votes	%	Seats
Party		Blu- denz	Feld- kirch	Voting card	Total votes	%	Seats
Austrian People's Party	ÖVP	11,347	17,613	88	29,048	33.20%	1
Freedom Party of Austria	FPÖ	8,740	13,144	45	21,929	25.06%	0
Social Democratic Party of Austria	SPÖ	6,719	9,432	99	16,250	18.57%	0
NEOS – The New Austria and Liberal Forum	NEOS	2,860	5,167	83	8,110	9.27%	0
The Greens – The Green Alternative	GRÜNE	1,614	4,749	67	6,430	7.35%	0
Peter Pilz List	PILZ	861	1,676	36	2,573	2.94%	0
My Vote Counts!	GILT	311	732	6	1,049	1.20%	0
New Movement for the Future	NBZ	213	523	0	736	0.84%	0
Communist Party of Austria	KPÖ	197	408	14	619	0.71%	0
Christian Party of Austria	CPÖ	105	134	0	239	0.27%	0
Free List Austria	FLÖ	95	113	0	208	0.24%	0
The Whites	WEIßE	89	117	1	207	0.24%	0
Men's Party	M	37	71	0	108	0.12%	0
Valid Votes		33,188	53,879	439	87,506	100.00%	1
Rejected Votes		238	354	3	595	0.68%	
Total Polled		33,426	54,233	442	88,101	73.04%	
Registered Electors		45,446	75,175		120,621		
Turnout		73.55%	72.14%		73.04%		

The following candidates were elected:

- Personal mandates - Karlheinz Kopf (ÖVP), 4,819 votes.

===== 2013 =====
Results of the 2013 legislative election held on 29 September 2013:

Party		Votes per district			Total votes	%	Seats
Party		Blu- denz	Feld- kirch	Voting card	Total votes	%	Seats
Austrian People's Party	ÖVP	7,820	11,357	42	19,219	24.57%	0
Freedom Party of Austria	FPÖ	6,424	9,093	17	15,534	19.86%	0
The Greens – The Green Alternative	GRÜNE	3,931	9,495	116	13,542	17.32%	0
Social Democratic Party of Austria	SPÖ	4,988	5,924	14	10,926	13.97%	0
NEOS – The New Austria	NEOS	4,341	6,269	67	10,677	13.65%	0
Team Stronach	FRANK	1,441	2,754	11	4,206	5.38%	0
Alliance for the Future of Austria	BZÖ	853	1,159	3	2,015	2.58%	0
Pirate Party of Austria	PIRAT	254	408	6	668	0.85%	0
Christian Party of Austria	CPÖ	240	279	1	520	0.66%	0
Communist Party of Austria	KPÖ	145	264	1	410	0.52%	0
EU Exit Party	EUAUS	92	183	2	277	0.35%	0
Men's Party	M	67	145	0	212	0.27%	0
Valid Votes		30,596	47,330	280	78,206	100.00%	0
Rejected Votes		376	560	5	941	1.19%	
Total Polled		30,972	47,890	285	79,147	66.64%	
Registered Electors		45,443	73,320		118,763		
Turnout		68.16%	65.32%		66.64%		

==== 2000s ====
===== 2008 =====
Results of the 2008 legislative election held on 28 September 2008:

Party		Votes per district			Total votes	%	Seats
Party		Blu- denz	Feld- kirch	Voting card	Total votes	%	Seats
Austrian People's Party	ÖVP	9,712	14,332	194	24,238	29.37%	1
The Greens – The Green Alternative	GRÜNE	4,391	9,841	289	14,521	17.60%	0
Freedom Party of Austria	FPÖ	5,293	8,012	52	13,357	16.19%	0
Social Democratic Party of Austria	SPÖ	5,755	6,724	57	12,536	15.19%	0
Alliance for the Future of Austria	BZÖ	4,406	6,298	54	10,758	13.04%	0
Fritz Dinkhauser List – Citizens' Forum Tyrol	FRITZ	1,166	1,677	21	2,864	3.47%	0
Liberal Forum	LiF	675	1,363	46	2,084	2.53%	0
The Christians	DC	508	752	7	1,267	1.54%	0
Communist Party of Austria	KPÖ	173	323	3	499	0.60%	0
Independent Citizens' Initiative Save Austria	RETTÖ	146	242	4	392	0.48%	0
Valid Votes		32,225	49,564	727	82,516	100.00%	1
Rejected Votes		495	695	9	1,199	1.43%	
Total Polled		32,720	50,259	736	83,715	71.83%	
Registered Electors		45,395	71,158		116,553		
Turnout		72.08%	70.63%		71.83%		

The following candidates were elected:

- Personal mandates - Karlheinz Kopf (ÖVP), 4,703 votes.

===== 2006 =====
Results of the 2006 legislative election held on 1 October 2006:

Party		Votes per district			Total votes	%	Seats
Party		Blu- denz	Feld- kirch	Voting card	Total votes	%	Seats
Austrian People's Party	ÖVP	12,105	17,497	1,562	31,164	40.14%	1
Social Democratic Party of Austria	SPÖ	6,961	8,133	543	15,637	20.14%	0
The Greens – The Green Alternative	GRÜNE	3,551	7,958	1,188	12,697	16.35%	0
Freedom Party of Austria	FPÖ	3,126	4,502	190	7,818	10.07%	0
Hans-Peter Martin's List	MATIN	2,394	3,888	220	6,502	8.37%	0
Alliance for the Future of Austria	BZÖ	1,045	1,621	76	2,742	3.53%	0
EU Withdrawal – Neutral Free Austria	NFÖ	206	388	23	617	0.79%	0
Communist Party of Austria	KPÖ	170	271	27	468	0.60%	0
Valid Votes		29,558	44,258	3,829	77,645	100.00%	1
Rejected Votes		260	411	23	694	0.89%	
Total Polled		29,818	44,669	3,852	78,339	70.55%	
Registered Electors		43,602	67,443		111,045		
Turnout		68.39%	66.23%		70.55%		

The following candidates were elected:

- Party mandates - Karlheinz Kopf (ÖVP), 4,835 votes.

===== 2002 =====
Results of the 2002 legislative election held on 24 November 2002:

Party		Votes per district			Total votes	%	Seats
Party		Blu- denz	Feld- kirch	Voting card	Total votes	%	Seats
Austrian People's Party	ÖVP	15,975	23,915	1,605	41,495	47.28%	1
Social Democratic Party of Austria	SPÖ	8,409	10,047	532	18,988	21.64%	0
The Greens – The Green Alternative	GRÜNE	3,760	7,758	1,276	12,794	14.58%	0
Freedom Party of Austria	FPÖ	4,432	6,724	234	11,390	12.98%	0
Liberal Forum	LiF	500	866	58	1,424	1.62%	0
Christian Voters Community	CWG	461	615	20	1,096	1.25%	0
Communist Party of Austria	KPÖ	121	258	11	390	0.44%	0
The Democrats		70	103	7	180	0.21%	0
Valid Votes		33,728	50,286	3,743	87,757	100.00%	1
Rejected Votes		407	703	28	1,138	1.28%	
Total Polled		34,135	50,989	3,771	88,895	84.72%	
Registered Electors		41,721	63,213		104,934		
Turnout		81.82%	80.66%		84.72%		

The following candidates were elected:

- Party mandates - Karlheinz Kopf (ÖVP), 6,708 votes.

==== 1990s ====
===== 1999 =====
Results of the 1999 legislative election held on 3 October 1999:

Party		Votes per district			Total votes	%	Seats
Party		Blu- denz	Feld- kirch	Voting card	Total votes	%	Seats
Austrian People's Party	ÖVP	9,874	14,329	1,320	25,523	33.82%	1
Freedom Party of Austria	FPÖ	8,864	13,042	667	22,573	29.91%	0
Social Democratic Party of Austria	SPÖ	6,899	7,536	537	14,972	19.84%	0
The Greens – The Green Alternative	GRÜNE	2,295	4,674	679	7,648	10.13%	0
Liberal Forum	LiF	1,006	1,991	459	3,456	4.58%	0
The Independents	DU	155	282	17	454	0.60%	0
No to NATO and EU – Neutral Austria Citizens' Initiative	NEIN	172	252	7	431	0.57%	0
Christian Voters Community	CWG	122	115	6	243	0.32%	0
Communist Party of Austria	KPÖ	54	95	18	167	0.22%	0
Valid Votes		29,441	42,316	3,710	75,467	100.00%	1
Rejected Votes		283	352	16	651	0.86%	
Total Polled		29,724	42,668	3,726	76,118	74.69%	
Registered Electors		40,908	60,998		101,906		
Turnout		72.66%	69.95%		74.69%		

The following candidates were elected:

- Personal mandates - Karlheinz Kopf (ÖVP), 4,594 votes.

===== 1995 =====
Results of the 1995 legislative election held on 17 December 1995:

Party		Votes per district			Total votes	%	Seats
Party		Blu- denz	Feld- kirch	Voting card	Total votes	%	Seats
Austrian People's Party	ÖVP	10,443	15,358	755	26,556	32.84%	1
Freedom Party of Austria	FPÖ	8,812	12,744	306	21,862	27.04%	0
Social Democratic Party of Austria	SPÖ	8,855	10,416	458	19,729	24.40%	0
The Greens – The Green Alternative	GRÜNE	1,837	3,633	493	5,963	7.37%	0
Liberal Forum	LiF	1,817	3,318	449	5,584	6.91%	0
No – Civic Action Group; Against the Sale of Austria	NEIN	409	556	18	983	1.22%	0
Communist Party of Austria	KPÖ	77	96	6	179	0.22%	0
Valid Votes		32,250	46,121	2,485	80,856	100.00%	1
Rejected Votes		497	808	7	1,312	1.60%	
Total Polled		32,747	46,929	2,492	82,168	83.31%	
Registered Electors		39,958	58,669		98,627		
Turnout		81.95%	79.99%		83.31%		

The following candidates were elected:

- Party mandates - Karlheinz Kopf (ÖVP), 1,621 votes.

===== 1994 =====
Results of the 1994 legislative election held on 9 October 1994:

Party		Votes per district			Total votes	%	Seats
Party		Blu- denz	Feld- kirch	Voting card	Total votes	%	Seats
Austrian People's Party	ÖVP	10,019	14,528	1,156	25,703	36.40%	1
Freedom Party of Austria	FPÖ	6,783	9,151	455	16,389	23.21%	0
Social Democratic Party of Austria	SPÖ	7,258	8,193	520	15,971	22.62%	0
The Greens – The Green Alternative	GRÜNE	1,922	3,633	675	6,230	8.82%	0
Liberal Forum	LiF	1,417	2,574	452	4,443	6.29%	0
Christian Voters Community	CWG	354	348	21	723	1.02%	0
No – Civic Action Group; Against the Sale of Austria	NEIN	213	230	11	454	0.64%	0
Natural Law Party	ÖNP	98	122	6	226	0.32%	0
Citizen Greens Austria – Free Democrats	BGÖ	71	141	9	221	0.31%	0
United Greens Austria – List Adi Pinter	VGÖ	63	82	4	149	0.21%	0
Fritz Georg		45	55	2	102	0.14%	0
Valid Votes		28,243	39,057	3,311	70,611	100.00%	1
Rejected Votes		337	473	18	828	1.16%	
Total Polled		28,580	39,530	3,329	71,439	72.90%	
Registered Electors		39,975	58,015		97,990		
Turnout		71.49%	68.14%		72.90%		

The following candidates were elected:

- Party mandates - Karlheinz Kopf (ÖVP), 3,019 votes.
