= Ottnang am Hausruck =

- Municipality
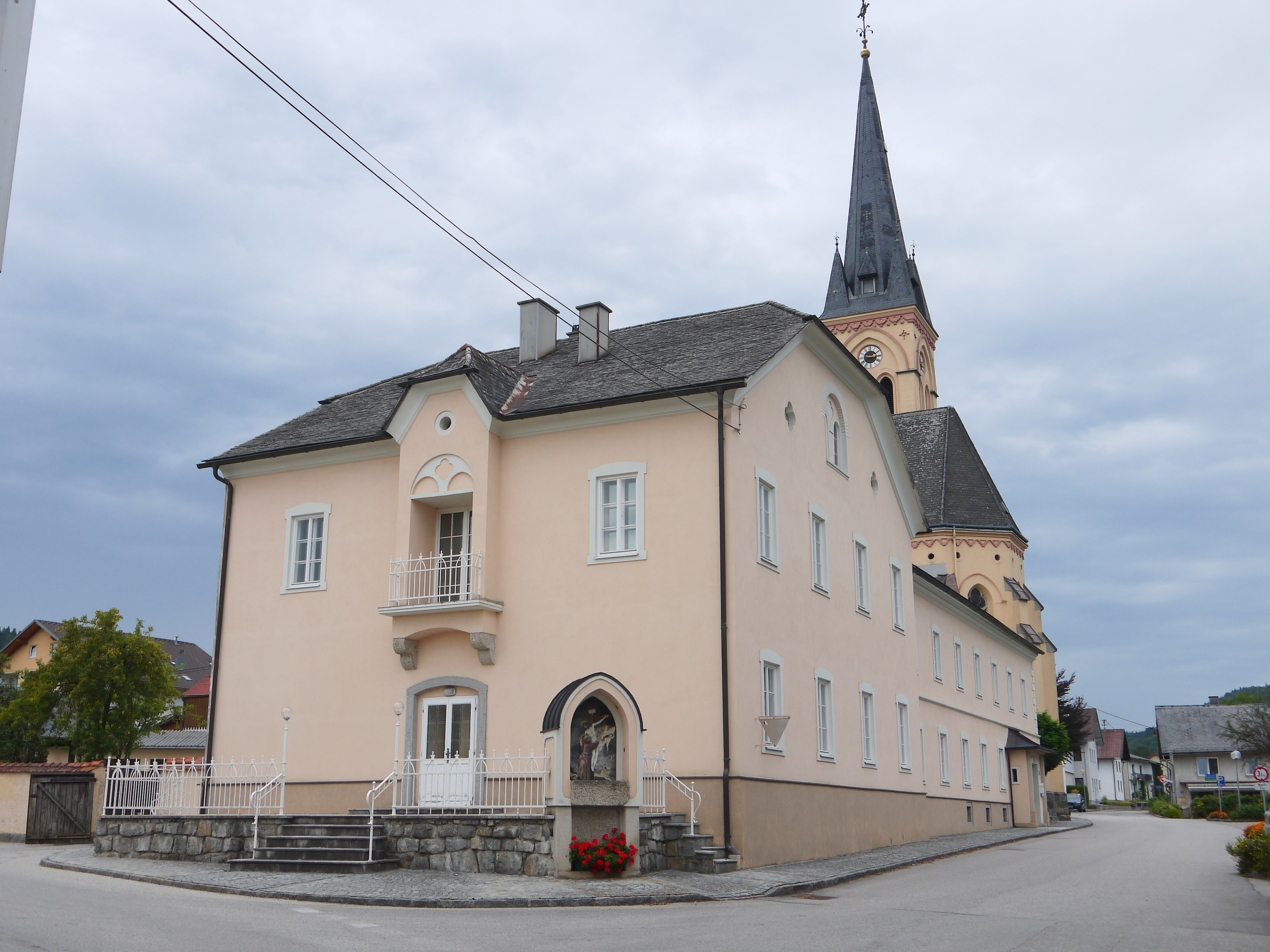

- Coat of arms

- Location within Austria
- Coordinates: 48°05′44″N 13°39′41″E
- Country: Austria
- State: Upper Austria
- District: Vöcklabruck

Government
  - Mayor: Peter Helml (SPÖ)

Area
  - Total: 30.32 km^{2} (11.71 sq mi)
- Elevation: 554 m (1,818 ft)

Population (2018-01-01)
  - Total: 3,990
  - Density: 132/km^{2} (341/sq mi)
- Time zone: UTC+1 (CET)
  - Summer (DST): UTC+2 (CEST)
- Postal code: 4901
- Area code: 07676
- Vehicle registration: VB
- Website: www.ottnang.ooe.gv.at

Ottnang am Hausruck is a municipality in the district of Vöcklabruck in the Austrian state of Upper Austria.

== Population ==
Historical population
Year	Pop.	±%
1991	3,743	—
2001	3,745	+0.1%
2016	3,855	+2.9%

== Notable people ==
- Barbara Prammer, President of the National Council of Austria since 2006, is a native of the municipality.
