= President of the National Council (Austria) =

Speaker of the lower house of the Austrian Parliament

President of the National Council Präsident des Nationalrates
- Coat of arms

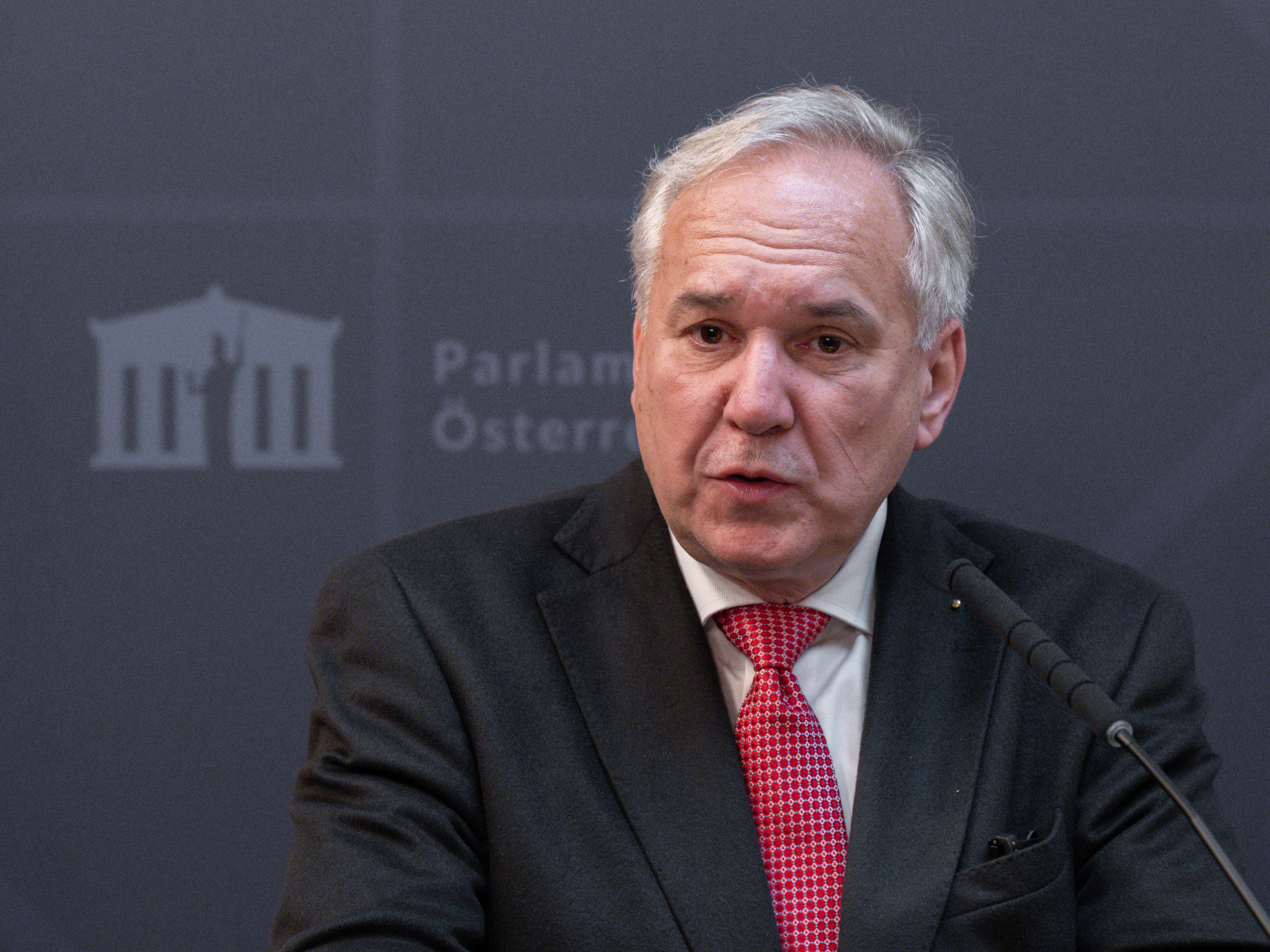
- Incumbent; Walter Rosenkranz since 24 October 2024
- National Council of Austria
- Style: Mr. President (when addressed in parliament)
- Status: Primary presiding officer
- Member of: National Council
- Seat: Austrian Parliament Building, Innere Stadt, Vienna
- Nominator: Political parties
- Appointer: National Council
- Constituting instrument: Constitution of Austria
- First holder: Karl Seitz
- Deputy: Peter Haubner; Second President; Doris Bures; Third President
- Website: parlament.gv.at

The president of the National Council is the presiding officer of the National Council, the lower house of the Austrian Parliament.

Since October 2024, Walter Rosenkranz (FPÖ) has served as President of the National Council, Peter Haubner (ÖVP) as Second President, and Doris Bures (SPÖ) as Third President. The three presidents together form the Presidium of the National Council.

In the Austrian order of precedence, the president of the National Council places after the president of Austria and before the chancellor.

== Election ==
The president, the second and the third president are elected by the majority of the National Council at the beginning of each legislative session.

The Presidium even remains active after the dissolution of the National Council, until the Council obtains its new elected leadership. This also applies if the president of the former legislative session has no mandate in the new session.

In the second republic it became a political practice that the most powerful party receives the president and the second and third most powerful party the second and third president.

== Tasks and duties ==
The exact tasks of the president and his deputies are determined in the Nationalratsgeschäftsordnung. He is in charge of the administrative affairs of the National Council and creates a budget concept for the Council with the second and third president. The president is the representative of national council for the public and has to ensure moderation and balanced rights. He handles the Geschäftsordnung and has to guarantee for its observance (especially for the maintenance silence and order and the meeting hall), he exercises the Hausrecht in the Austrian Parliament Building and heads the parliamentary directorate.

The three presidents and the parliamentary leaders together form the Präsidialkonferenz, a communicative organisation responsible for amiable cooperation under the parties within the Council.

The Presidium assumes the tasks of the Federal President in case of a longer during prevention or permanent suspension, for example because of death, a resignation or a deposition. This should ensure that overseeing tasks towards the Government and other duties are not lost.

== List of officeholders ==
=== List of presidents ===
National Assembly

Name	Entered office	Left office	Party
Karl Seitz, President of the Provisional National Assembly	21 October 1918	4 March 1919	SDAP
Jodok Fink/Johann Nepomuk Hauser, President	21 October 1918	4 March 1919	CS
Franz Dinghofer, President	21 October 1918	4 March 1919	GDVP
Karl Seitz, President of the Constituent National Assembly	4 March 1919	10 November 1920	SDAP

First Austrian Republic

Name	Entered office	Left office	Party
Richard Weiskirchner	10 November 1920	19 November 1923	CS
Wilhelm Miklas	20 November 1923	6 December 1928	CS
Alfred Gürtler	13 December 1928	1 October 1930	CS
Matthias Eldersch	4 December 1930	20 April 1931	SDAP
Karl Renner	29 April 1931	4 March 1933	SDAP

Second Republic

Name	Entered office	Left office	Party
Leopold Kunschak	19 December 1945	13 March 1953	ÖVP
Felix Hurdes	18 March 1953	8 June 1959	ÖVP
Leopold Figl	9 June 1959	5 February 1962	ÖVP
Alfred Maleta	14 February 1962	30 March 1970	ÖVP
Karl Waldbrunner	31 March 1970	3 November 1971	SPÖ
Anton Benya	4 November 1971	16 December 1986	SPÖ
Leopold Gratz	17 December 1986	23 February 1989	SPÖ
Rudolf Pöder	28 February 1989	4 November 1990	SPÖ
Heinz Fischer	5 November 1990	19 December 2002	SPÖ
Andreas Khol	20 December 2002	29 October 2006	ÖVP
Barbara Prammer	30 October 2006	2 August 2014	SPÖ
Doris Bures	2 September 2014	8 November 2017	SPÖ
Elisabeth Köstinger	9 November 2017	17 December 2017	ÖVP
Wolfgang Sobotka	20 December 2017	24 October 2024	ÖVP
Walter Rosenkranz	24 October 2024	present	FPÖ

=== List of second presidents ===
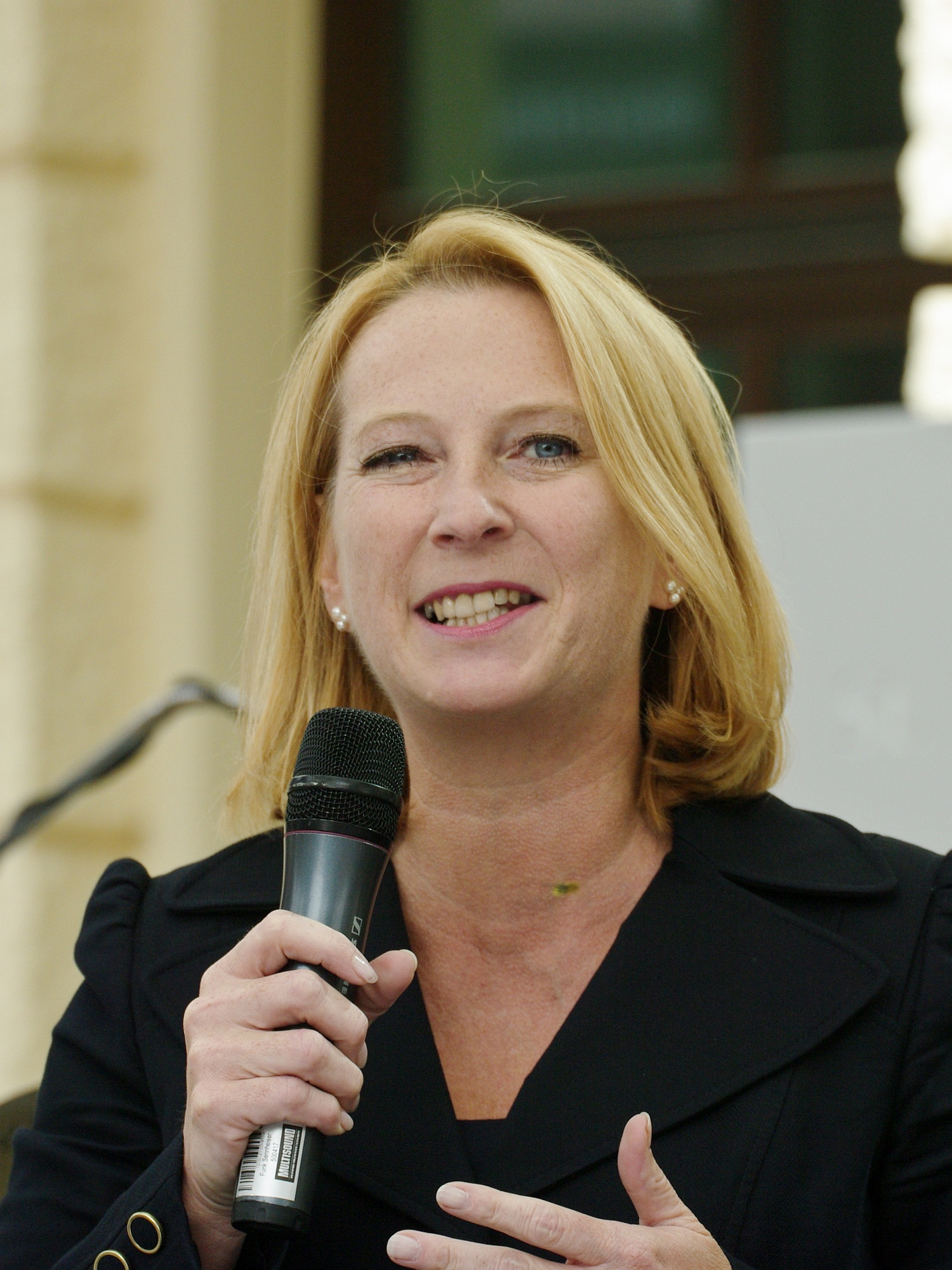
Doris Bures, Second President of the National Council

First Austrian Republic

Name	Entered office	Left office	Party
Matthias Eldersch	10. November 1920	14. Dezember 1920	SDAP
Karl Seitz	1920	1923	SDAP
Matthias Eldersch	1923	1930	SDAP
Rudolf Ramek	1930	1933	CS

Second Republic

Name	Entered office	Left office	Party
Johann Böhm	1945	1959	SPÖ
Franz Olah	1959	1961	SPÖ
Friedrich Hillegeist	1961	1962	SPÖ
Karl Waldbrunner	1962	1970	SPÖ
Alfred Maleta	1970	1975	ÖVP
Roland Minkowitsch	1975	1986	ÖVP
Marga Hubinek	1986	1990	ÖVP
Robert Lichal	1990	1994	ÖVP
Heinrich Neisser	1994	1999	ÖVP
Thomas Prinzhorn	1999	2002	FPÖ
Heinz Fischer	2002	2004	SPÖ
Barbara Prammer	2004	2006	SPÖ
Michael Spindelegger	2006	2008	ÖVP
Fritz Neugebauer	2008	2013	ÖVP
Karlheinz Kopf	2013	2017	ÖVP
Doris Bures	2017	2024	SPÖ
Peter Haubner	2024	present	ÖVP

=== List of third presidents ===
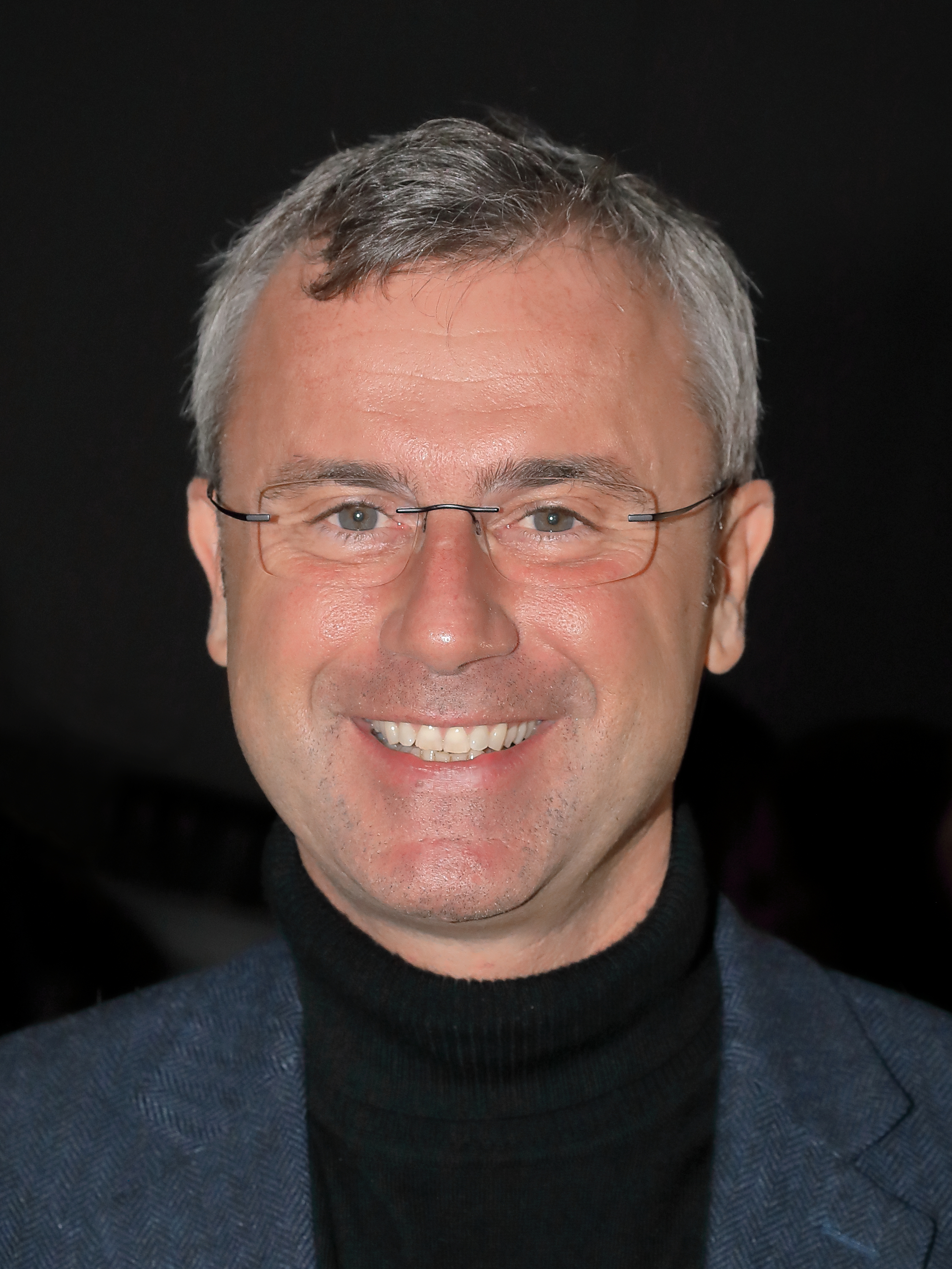
Norbert Hofer, Third President of the National Council

First Austrian Republic

Name	Entered office	Left office	Party
Franz Dinghofer	1920	1926	GDVP
Leopold Waber	1926	1930	GDVP
Sepp Straffner	1930	1931	GDVP
Stephan Tauschitz	1931	1932	LBd
Sepp Straffner	1932	1933	GDVP

Second Republic

Name	Entered office	Left office	Party
Alfons Gorbach	1945	1953	ÖVP
Karl Hartleb	1953	1956	WdU
Alfons Gorbach	1956	1961	ÖVP
Alfred Maleta	1961	1962	ÖVP
Josef Wallner	1962	1970	ÖVP
Otto Probst	1970	1978	SPÖ
Herbert Pansi	1978	1979	SPÖ
Rudolf Thalhammer	1979	1983	SPÖ
Gerulf Stix	1983	1990	FPÖ
Siegfried Dillersberger	15 March 1990	4 November 1990	FPÖ
Heide Schmidt	1990	1994	FPÖ
Herbert Haupt	1994	1996	FPÖ
Willi Brauneder	1996	1999	FPÖ
Andreas Khol	1999	2000	ÖVP
Werner Fasslabend	2000	2002	ÖVP
Thomas Prinzhorn	2002	2006	FPÖ
Eva Glawischnig-Piesczek	2006	2008	Grüne
Martin Graf	2008	2013	FPÖ
Norbert Hofer	2013	2017	FPÖ
Anneliese Kitzmüller	2017	2019	FPÖ
Norbert Hofer	2019	2024	FPÖ
Doris Bures	2024	present	SPÖ

== See also ==
- Politics of Austria
