= Peter Haubner =

Austrian politician (born 1960)

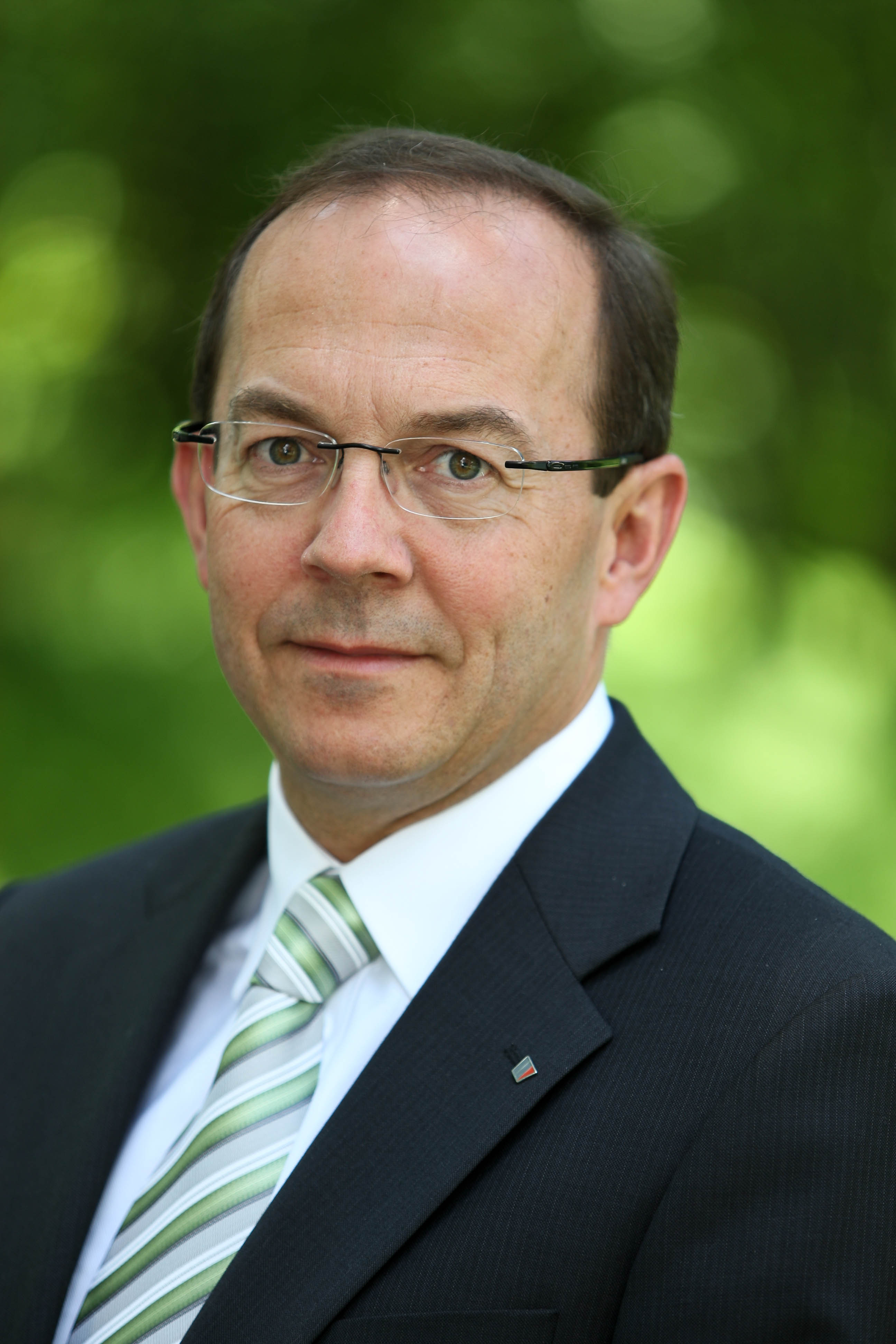

Second President of the National Council
- Incumbent
- Assumed office 24 October 2024
- President: Walter Rosenkranz
- Preceded by: Doris Bures

Member of the National Council
- Incumbent
- Assumed office 3 December 2001
- Constituency: Flachgau-Tennengau

Personal details
- Born: 2 January 1960 (age 66) Salzburg, Salzburg, Austria
- Party: People's Party

Peter Haubner (born 2 January 1960) is an Austrian politician and member of the National Council for the Austrian People's Party (ÖVP). Since 24 October 2024, Haubner has held the office of Second President of the National Council.

== Politics ==
Between 2000 and 2004, Haubner was deputy chairman of the Salzburg Chamber of Commerce (Salzburg Leisure Industry Group). He has represented the ÖVP in the Austrian National Council since 2001. From 2004 to 2005, Haubner took over the management of the Salzburg People's Party. From 2006 to 2008, he was district chairman of the Salzburg City Chamber of Commerce. Peter Haubner was also chairman of the Salzburg City Economic Association from 2006 to 2018. From 2011 to 2013, Haubner was the energy spokesman for the Austrian People's Party, and has been the spokesman for the economy since 2011. He has also been the deputy leader of the ÖVP parliamentary group since 2008. From 2008 to the end of 2017, he was Secretary General of the Austrian Economic Association.

In July 2019, he succeeded Angelika Winzig as his party's budget spokesperson. At the beginning of the 28th session, he was nominated by the ÖVP for and elected to the office of Second President of the National Council.
