= Gusenbauer government =

Government of Austria under Alfred Gusenbauer

- Cabinet of Austria
- 2007–2008
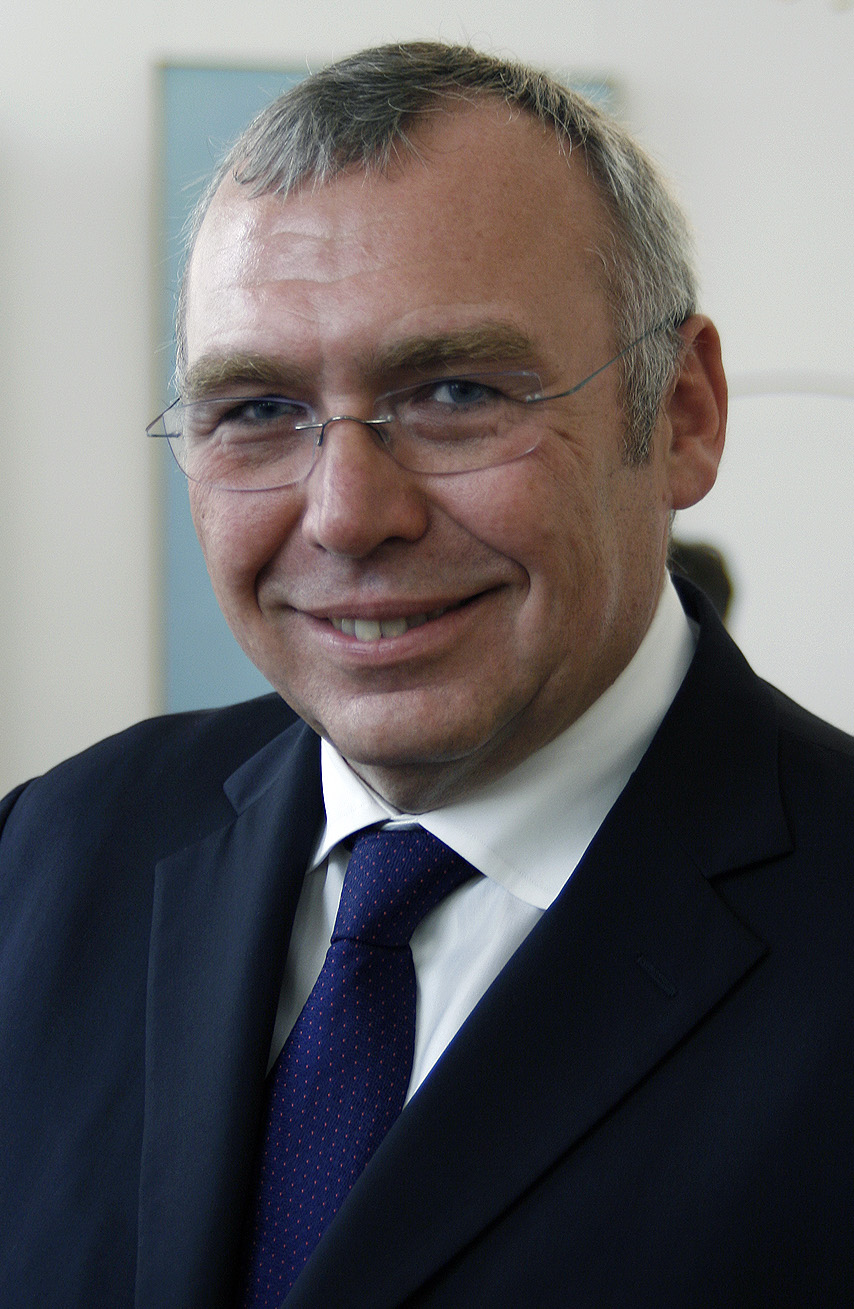
- Gusenbauer in 2008
- Date formed: 11 January 2007
- Date dissolved: 8 December 2008

People and organisations
- Appointed by: Heinz Fischer
- Chancellor: Alfred Gusenbauer
- Vice-Chancellor: Wilhelm Molterer
- Member parties: Social Democratic Party of Austria (SPÖ); Austrian People's Party (ÖVP)
- Status in legislature: Grand coalition
- No. of ministers: 14
- Opposition parties: The Greens (GRÜNE); Freedom Party of Austria (FPÖ); Alliance for the Future of Austria (BZÖ)
- Opposition leader: Alexander Van der Bellen

History
- Election(s): 2006 legislative election
- Predecessor: Schüssel II
- Successor: Faymann I

The Gusenbauer government (German: Bundesregierung Gusenbauer) was sworn in on 11 January 2007 and left office on 2 December 2008.

== Composition ==
The cabinet was a coalition between the Social Democratic Party and the People's Party. Each party had seven members in the cabinet.

Portfolio	Minister	Took office	Left office	Party
Federal Chancellery
Federal Chancellor and Minister for Sports	Alfred Gusenbauer	11 January 2007	8 December 2008	SPÖ
Secretary of State at the Chancellery	Heidrun Silhavy	11 January 2007	30 June 2008	SPÖ
Secretary of State at the Chancellery	Andreas Schieder	1 July 2008	8 December 2008	SPÖ
Secretary of State for Sport	Reinhard Lopatka	11 January 2007	8 December 2008	ÖVP
Vice-Chancellor and Minister for Finance	Wilhelm Molterer	11 January 2007	8 December 2008	ÖVP
Secretary of State for Finance	Christoph Matznetter	11 January 2007	8 December 2008	SPÖ
Federal Ministry of Economics and Labour
Federal Minister of Economics and Labour	Martin Bartenstein	11 January 2007	8 December 2008	ÖVP
Secretary of State for Labour	Christine Marek	11 January 2007	8 December 2008	ÖVP
Federal Ministry for European and International Affairs
Federal Minister for European and International Affairs	Ursula Plassnik	11 January 2007	8 December 2008	ÖVP
Secretary of State for Europe	Hans Winkler	11 January 2007	8 December 2008	Independent
Federal Ministry for Agriculture, Forestry, Environment and Water Management
Federal Minister for Agriculture, Forestry, Environment and Water Management	Josef Pröll	11 January 2007	8 December 2008	ÖVP
Federal Ministry for National Defense
Federal Minister for National Defense	Norbert Darabos	11 January 2007	8 December 2008	SPÖ
Federal Ministry for Women, Media and Public Service
Federal Minister for Women, Media and Public Service	Doris Bures	11 January 2007	30 June 2008	SPÖ
Federal Minister for Women, Media and Public Service	Heidrun Silhavy	1 July 2008	2 December 2008	SPÖ
Federal Ministry for Health, Family and Youth
Federal Minister for Health, Family and Youth	Andrea Kdolsky	11 January 2007	8 December 2008	ÖVP
Federal Ministry for Education, Art and Culture
Federal Minister for Education, Art and Culture	Claudia Schmied	11 January 2007	8 December 2008	SPÖ
Federal Ministry for Interior Affairs
Federal Minister for Interior Affairs	Günther Platter	11 January 2007	30 June 2008	ÖVP
Federal Minister for Interior Affairs	Maria Fekter	1 July 2008	8 December 2008	ÖVP
Federal Ministry for Justice
Federal Minister for Justice	Maria Berger	11 January 2007	8 December 2008	SPÖ
Federal Ministry for Social Affairs and Consumer Protection
Federal Minister for Social Affairs and Consumer Protection	Erwin Buchinger	11 January 2007	8 December 2008	SPÖ
Ministry for Transport, Innovation and Technology
Minister of Transport, Innovation and Technology	Werner Faymann	11 January 2007	8 December 2008	SPÖ
Secretary of State for Infrastructure	Christa Kranzl	11 January 2007	8 December 2008	SPÖ
Federal Ministry for Science and Research
Federal Minister for Science and Research	Johannes Hahn	11 January 2007	8 December 2008	ÖVP
