= Beatrix Karl =

Austrian politician (born 1967)

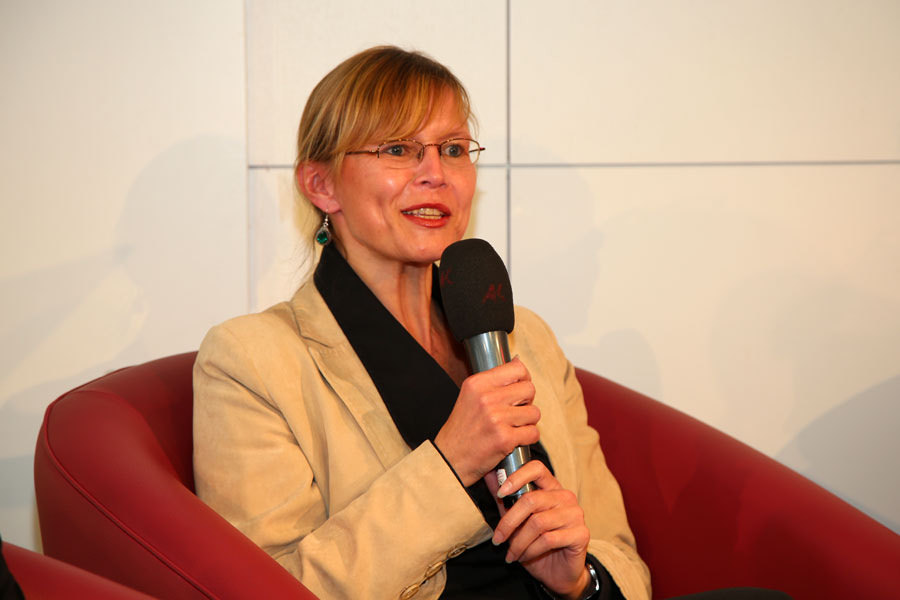

Member of the National Council
- In office 30 October 2006 – 26 January 2010
- In office 29 October 2013 – 8 November 2017

Federal Minister for Science and Research
- In office 26 January 2010 – 20 April 2011
- President: Heinz Fischer
- Chancellor: Werner Faymann
- Preceded by: Johannes Hahn
- Succeeded by: Karlheinz Töchterle

Justice Minister of Austria
- In office 21 April 2011 – 16 December 2013
- Preceded by: Claudia Bandion-Ortner
- Succeeded by: Wolfgang Brandstetter

Personal details
- Political party: Austrian People's Party

Beatrix Karl (born 10 December 1967) is an Austrian academic and politician. A former member of the National Council, she served as Minister for Science and Research (2010–2011) and as Minister of Justice (2011–2013) in the first Faymann government.

== Early life and career ==
Karl was born in 1967 in Graz, Styria, and grew up in Bad Gleichenberg. She studied law at the University of Graz, completing a Magister degree in 1991 and a doctorate in 1995. She then worked at the Max Planck Institute for Social Law and Social Policy in Munich. Starting in 2001 she was an assistant professor, and full professor from 2003, at her alma mater.

In October 2017, Karl was named vice-rector of the Pädagogische Hochschule Steiermark (University College of Teacher Education Styria) with responsibility for research and development.

== Politics ==
Karl unsuccessfully ran in the 2005 Styrian state election for the Austrian People's Party (ÖVP). In the 2006 Austrian legislative election she won a seat on the National Council and was re-elected in 2008. From 2009 – 2010 she was general secretary of the ÖVP's labour organisation (ÖAAB).

On 26 January 2010, Karl was appointed to the cabinet of Werner Faymann, succeeding Johannes Hahn as Federal Minister for Science and Research. She made plans to re-introduce nationwide tuition fees for all university students, among other cost-saving measures.

She moved to lead the Ministry of Justice in an April 2011 cabinet reshuffle. Karl was widely criticised after a 14-year old, who had been incorrectly detained, was sexually assaulted in jail. Critics accused her of ignoring the presumption of innocence, experts stated that lengthy pre-trial detention for minors was unacceptable. She later admitted that her ministry had mishandled the situation.

Karl was not reappointed in the second Faymann government, and resumed her membership of parliament until the 2017 election. She was also a candidate in the 2014 European Parliament election, but the ÖVP did not win enough seats for her to join the European Parliament.

In 2018, she was selected as Austria's government commissioner for Expo 2020 in Dubai.

She is Dame of Honor of the Order of St. George.
