= Thomas Prinzhorn =

Austrian entrepreneur and politician (born 1943)

Second President of the National Council
- In office 29 October 1999 – 20 December 2002
- Preceded by: Heinrich Neisser
- Succeeded by: Heinz Fischer

Third President of the National Council
- In office 20 December 2002 – 30 October 2006
- Preceded by: Werner Fasslabend
- Succeeded by: Eva Glawischnig-Piesczek

Personal details
- Born: 5 March 1943 Vienna, Austria
- Party: FPÖ, then BZÖ
- Education: Technical University of Vienna
- Profession: manager

Thomas Prinzhorn (born 5 March 1943 in Vienna) is an Austrian industrialist and politician of the national liberal party Alliance for the Future of Austria (BZÖ).

== Education ==
Prinzhorn was educated in engineering at the Technical University of Vienna, where he graduated in 1967 as Diplomingenieur (Master of Engineering), and subsequently studied business administration at Harvard University, graduating in 1973.

== Business and political careers ==
Prinzhorn inherited his father Harald's business empire (Prinzhorn Group) and became one of Austria's leading industrialists in the 1970s. He served on the board of the Federation of Austrian Industry from 1978. With a personal fortune of around 1.3 billion euro, he is considered Austria's second richest politician and the 9th richest Austrian (as of 2017). After his graduations, he established himself with the paper companies of his father, W. Hamburger Inc. and Mosburger Inc..

As a longtime CEO in various companies in the paper industry, he came to politics through the Federation of Austrian Industries. In 1978, he became member of its board of directors. From 1975 to 1988, he was chairman of its Committee on Education and Social Policy. From 1988 to 1993, he was chairman of its Economic Policy Committee, and from 1991 to 1993, he was president of the Viennese chapter of the Federation of Austrian Industries.

In 1996, as a candidate of the Freedom Party, he was elected to the National Council for the first time, and was Member of Parliament until 2006.

For the National Council election in 1999, he was originally expecting a nomination as a minister, provided he was appointed in the course of forming a government in 2000 by the President of Austria, Thomas Klestil, who noticed particularly tasteless xenophobic statements during the election campaign and rejected him. Instead, he was nominated by the Freedom Party, which was the second largest party at that time, as the Second President of the National Council, a position that provided less opportunity for political campaigning. In autumn 2002, it looked as if he should again play a greater role in the party, because in September 2002 in Linz, he was elected as the deputy party leader. After the early parliamentary elections in 2002, however, the Freedom Party fell back to third place, which meant that Prinzhorn became the Third President of the National Council. In this function, the entrepreneur and economic spokesman of the Freedom Party mainly served as a support of the government team led by the former Vice-Chancellor and Freedom Party chief Susanne Riess. The relationship with Carinthia's Governor Jörg Haider was noticeably cooled in the meantime. As a result of the intra-party turmoil in 2005, he quit serving for the Freedom Party on April 27, 2006. The reason for his withdrawal from the party was massive differences of opinion with respect to Haider's political orientation, although Prinzhorn had contributed vitally in creating a restructuring plan for the Lower Austrian Freedom Party, which had run into serious financial difficulties (Rosenstingl scandal). After his withdrawal, Prinzhorn became member of the new Party Alliance for the Future of Austria, which had split off from the Freedom Party, and was Member of Parliament until October 29, 2006. He served as the Third Speaker of Parliament until October 30, 2006.

== Personal life ==
Prinzhorn adopted Karl Philipp Ernst Ferdinand Alwig Kilian Schwarzenberg (b. 1979), until then legally the son of Karel Schwarzenberg (the former Czech Foreign Minister). On 20 March 1990, Karl Philipp began using the surname "Prinzhorn".
