= Doris Bures =

Austrian politician (born 1962)

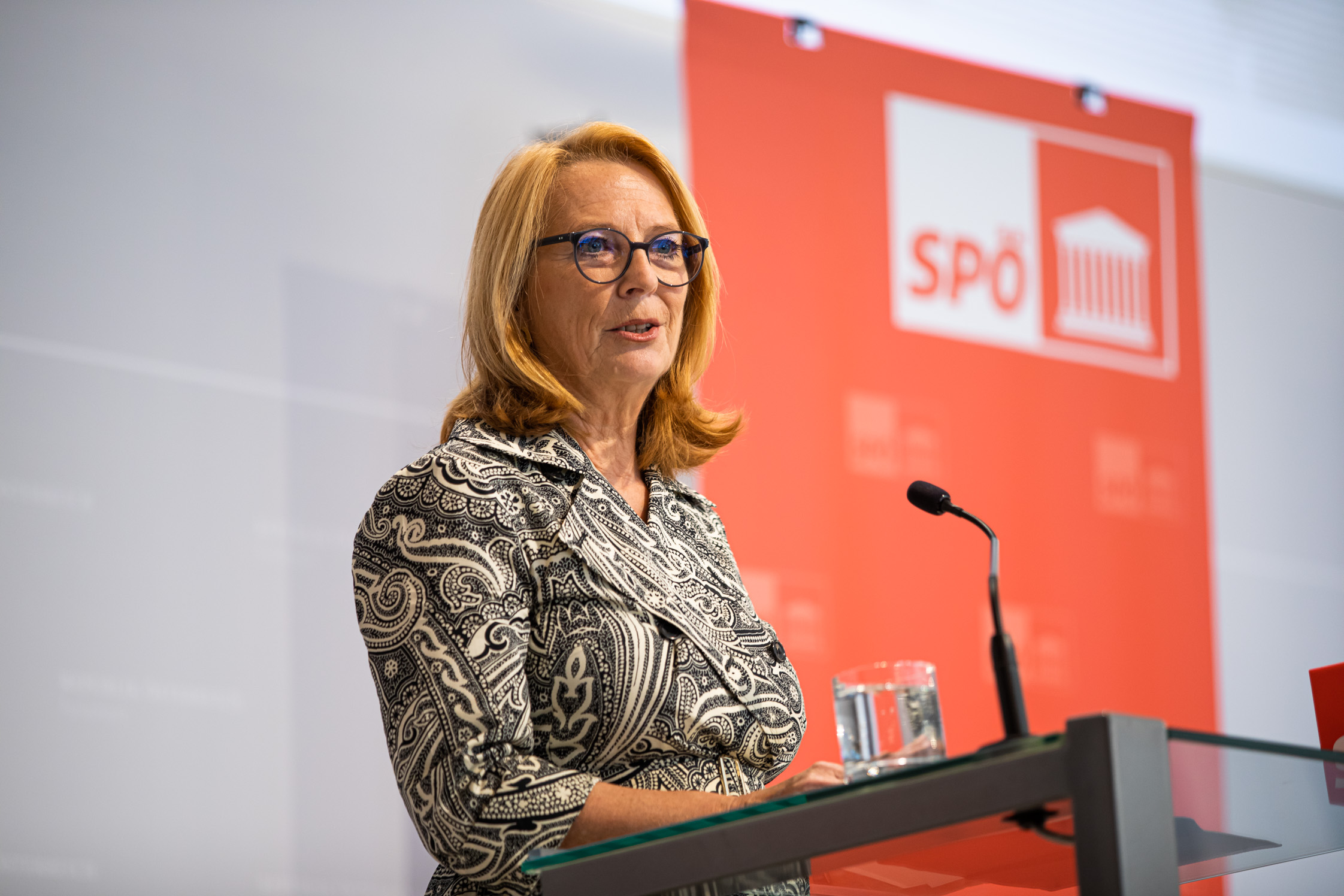
- Bures in 2021

Third President of the National Council
- Incumbent
- Assumed office 24 October 2024
- President: Walter Rosenkranz
- Preceded by: Norbert Hofer

Second President of the National Council
- In office 9 November 2017 – 23 October 2024
- President: Elisabeth Köstinger; Wolfgang Sobotka
- Preceded by: Karlheinz Kopf
- Succeeded by: Peter Haubner

President of the National Council
- In office 2 September 2014 – 8 November 2017
- Preceded by: Barbara Prammer
- Succeeded by: Elisabeth Köstinger

Minister of Transport, Innovation and Technology
- In office 2 December 2008 – 1 September 2014
- Chancellor: Werner Faymann
- Preceded by: Werner Faymann
- Succeeded by: Alois Stöger

Personal details
- Born: 3 August 1962 (age 62); Vienna, Austria
- Political party: Social Democratic Party
- Children: 1 daughter

Doris Bures (born 3 August 1962) is an Austrian politician of the Social Democratic Party of Austria (SPÖ) who serves as Third President of the Austrian National Council. From 2014 to 2017, she was its President and from 2017 to 2024 its Second President. She served as Minister of Transport, Innovation and Technology from 2008 to 2014.

== Education and early career ==
Bures attended elementary school and a commercial school. She became a federal secretary of the International Union of Socialist Youth in 1980 and worked in a project with unemployed young people between 1985 and 1986. Between 1988 and 1994 Bures was employed as secretary in a local social democratic organisation in Vienna and became general secretary of the Austrian tenant association in 1995. Afterwards Bures was Bundesgeschäftsführerin (executive director) of the SPÖ between 2000 and 2007 and also 2008.

== Political career ==
=== Early beginnings ===
Bures started her political career as a district councillor in Wien-Liesing between 1987 and 1990. She has been deputy to the party leader in the district of Liesing since 1995 and was chairwoman of the SPÖ-women in Liesing between 2000 and 2006.

=== Career in national politics ===
Bures was a member of the National Council of Austria between 5 November 1990 and 15 January 2007, and between 3 July 2008 and 2 December 2008. She served as a minister without portfolio in the Gusenbauer cabinet between 11 January 2007 and 28 February 2007, and was Minister for Women, Media and Public Service. Since 2 December 2008 Bures has served as Minister of Transport, Innovation and Technology. In September 2014 she was elected President of the National Council.

On 8 July 2016, when Austrian President Heinz Fischer left office, the position of Acting President fell jointly to the three presidents of the National Council – Bures, Norbert Hofer, and Karlheinz Kopf. Alexander Van der Bellen was elected President on 4 December 2016, receiving support from 53.3% of voters and defeating Hofer. Hofer, Bures, and Kopf remained as joint acting President until Van der Bellen was sworn into office in January 2017.

In addition to her committee assignments, Bures has been a member of the Austrian delegation to the Parliamentary Assembly of the Council of Europe (PACE) since 2018, where she serves on the Committee on Political Affairs and Democracy.

== Other activities ==
- Austrian Academy of Sciences, Chairwoman of the Senate (since 2014)
- Margaretha Lupac Foundation, Chairwoman of the Board of Trustees (since 2014)
- National Fund of the Republic of Austria for Victims of National Socialism, Chairwoman of the Board of Trustees (2014-2017)

== Controversy ==
In March 2018 an Austrian court found a hiring decision by her, as the Minister of Transport, to have been gender discrimination. She had selected a less-qualified female candidate for the ministry department manager job instead of the man who later filed the discrimination case. The man was awarded $390,000 as a compensation from the state.
