= Christoph Matznetter =

Austrian politician (born 1959)

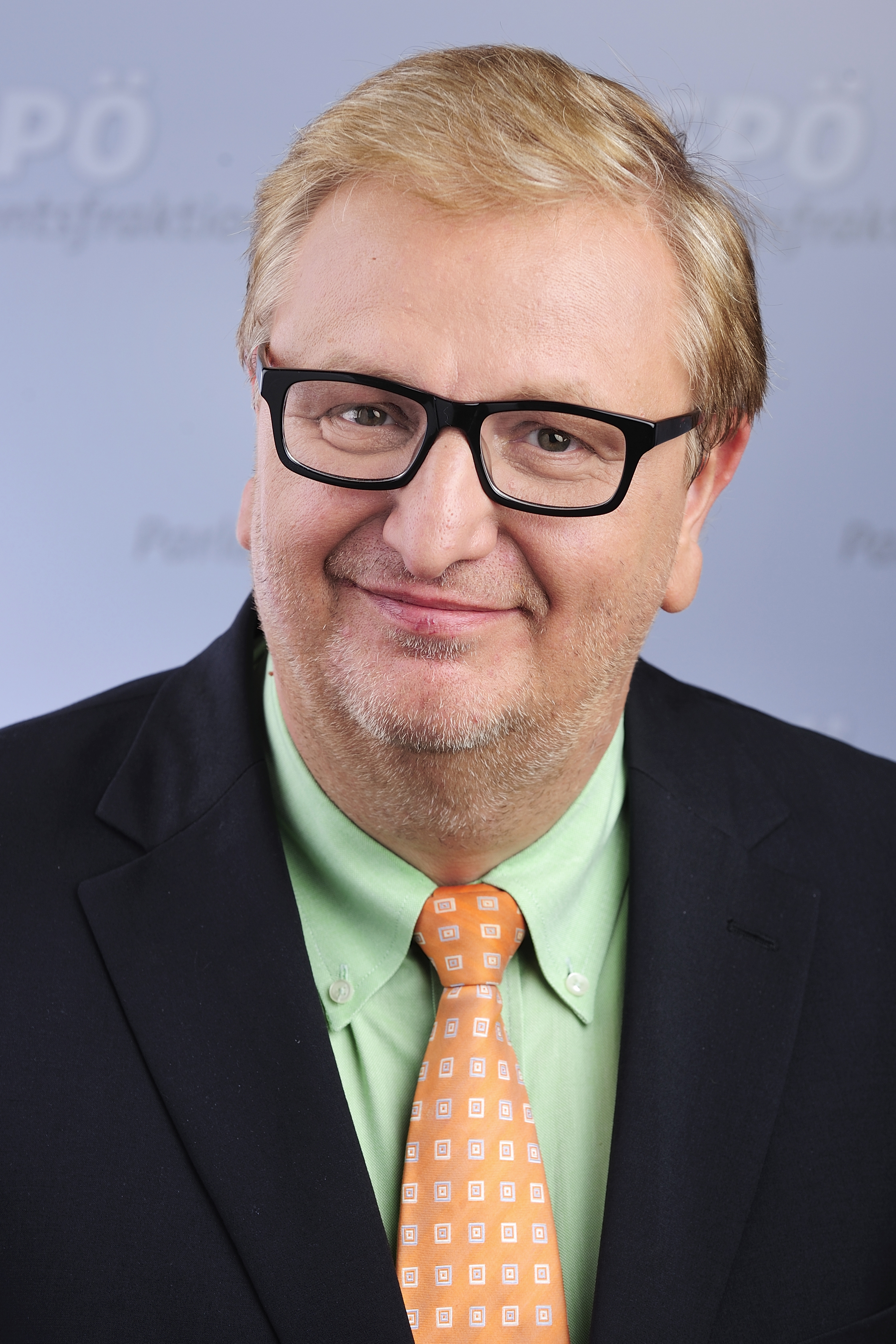
Christoph Matznetter

Christoph Matznetter (born 8 June 1959 in Vienna) is an Austrian politician. He has been a member of the Austrian Parliament since 2002. His service in parliament was interrupted by a brief tenure from 2007 to 2008 as State Secretary in the Federal Ministry of Finance. He is a member of the Social Democratic Party.

== Education and Professional Career ==
From 1978 to 1982, Matznetter studied political science at the University of Vienna, where he graduated with a master's degree. During his studies he apprenticed as an accountant, and in 1985 took the examinations to become a certified public accountant. From 1985 to 2004 he was managing director of Merkur-Treuhand Wirtschaftstreuhand- und Steuerberatungsges.m.b.H. In 2001, Matznetter resumed his academic studies at the University of Vienna, where he earned a Ph.D. in 2002. His dissertation focuses on EU tax policy and EU tax law.

== Political career ==
From November 2002 until January 2007 he was a Member of Parliament and speaker for Financial and Budget Affairs of the Social Democratic Parliamentary Fraction. Since June 2005 he is president of the Social Democratic Association for Enterprises and Entrepreneurs.

In January 2007 he was appointed as State Secretary in the Federal Ministry of Finance in the first government of Alfred Gusenbauer as Chancellor of Austria. Minister of Finance was Wilhelm Molterer, head of the conservative Austrian People's Party the coalition partner of the Social Democrats in this government.

With the inauguration of the new government of Werner Faymann as Chancellor of Austria in December 2008, 2nd Christoph Matznetter returned as Member and speaker for Economic Affairs of the Social Democratic Parliamentary Fraction in the Austrian Parliament. Since January 2009 he is also vice-president of the Austrian Federal Economic Chamber.

Since September 20, 2023, Matznetter has been chairman of the parliament's foreign policy committee.
