= Gabriele Heinisch-Hosek =

Austrian politician (born 1961)

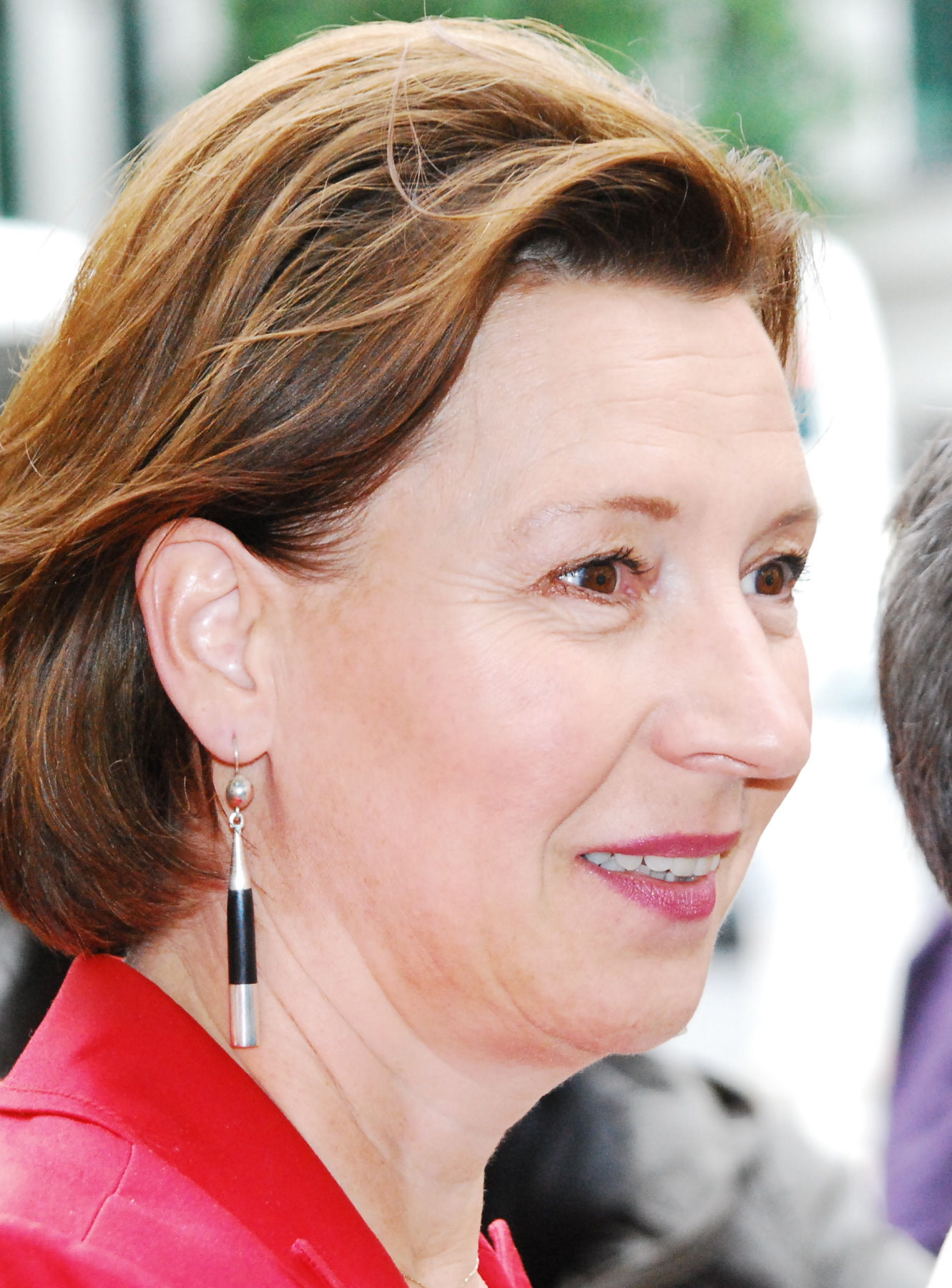
- Heinisch-Hosek in 2012

Federal Minister for Education, Arts and Culture
- In office 16 December 2013 – 18 May 2016
- Prime Minister: Werner Faymann
- Preceded by: Claudia Schmied
- Succeeded by: Sonja Hammerschmid

Federal Minister for Women and Civil Service
- In office 18 December 2008 – 16 December 2013
- Prime Minister: Werner Faymann
- Preceded by: Heidrun Silhavy

Personal details
- Born: 16 December 1961 (age 64) Guntramsdorf, Lower Austria
- Party: Social Democratic Party (SPÖ)
- Spouse: Walter Heinisch
- Education: Lower Austrian school of education, Baden bei Wien
- Profession: Teacher

Gabriele Heinisch-Hosek (born 16 December 1961) is an Austrian politician. She served as minister without portfolio between 2 December 2008 and 16 December 2013. In addition, she was the federal minister for women and civil service within the Federal Chancellery between 18 December 2008 and 18 May 2016.

== Early life and education ==
Heinisch-Hosek was born in Guntramsdorf, District of Mödling, Lower Austria, on 16 December 1961. She is a graduate of the Grammar School in Vienna (1976-1980). She graduated from the Teachers College in Baden in 1983.

== Career ==
Heinisch-Hosek, a teacher by training, worked in a Viennese toyshop and in the adult education center in Mödling from 1983 to 1984. Then she worked as a teacher in a secondary modern school in Vienna from 1984 to 1985. Next, she served as a teacher in a school for children with hearing impairments and deaf children again in Vienna from 1985 to 2002.

== Political career ==
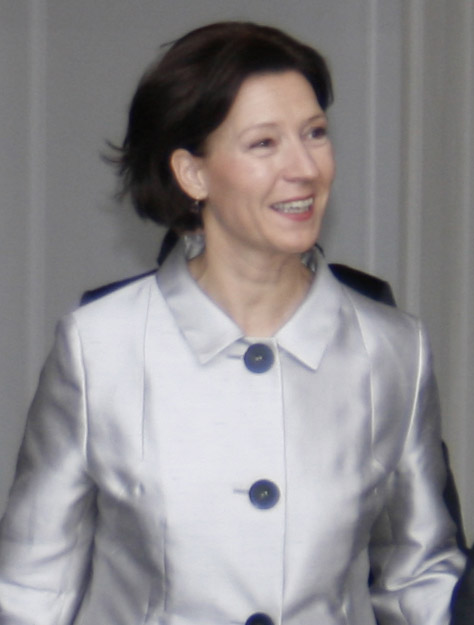
Minister Heinisch-Hosek, 2008

Heinisch-Hosek began her political career in 1990 as a member of the Guntramsdorf municipal council. In 1995, she became executive municipal councillor in Guntramsdorf. Her tenure lasted until 2008. She was a member of Parliament for the Social Democratic Party for the districts of Mödling and Greater Vienna from 1999 to 2008. She served as spokesperson for women’s affairs in parliament and chair of the parliamentary commission for the equal treatment of women from 2004 to April 2008.

She was appointed federal minister for women and civil service to the cabinet led by Werner Faymann on 2 December 2008, replacing Heidrun Silhavy in the post. She represents the Social Democrat Party in the coalition government formed by the Social Democrat Party and the People's Party. She has been dealing with gender equality problems in Austria. She has been also the chair of the women’s organisation of the Social Democratic Party since December 2009.

=== Views ===
In December 2009 Austria’s parliament approved a legislation that enables same-sex couples to enter into civil unions. Heinisch-Hosek regarded the vote as "the first step in the right direction." In 2010, she declared her support for a ban on the full Islamic veil in public spaces if the number of women veiled from head to toe increases dramatically.
