= Claudia Bandion-Ortner =

Austrian judge and politician (born 1966)

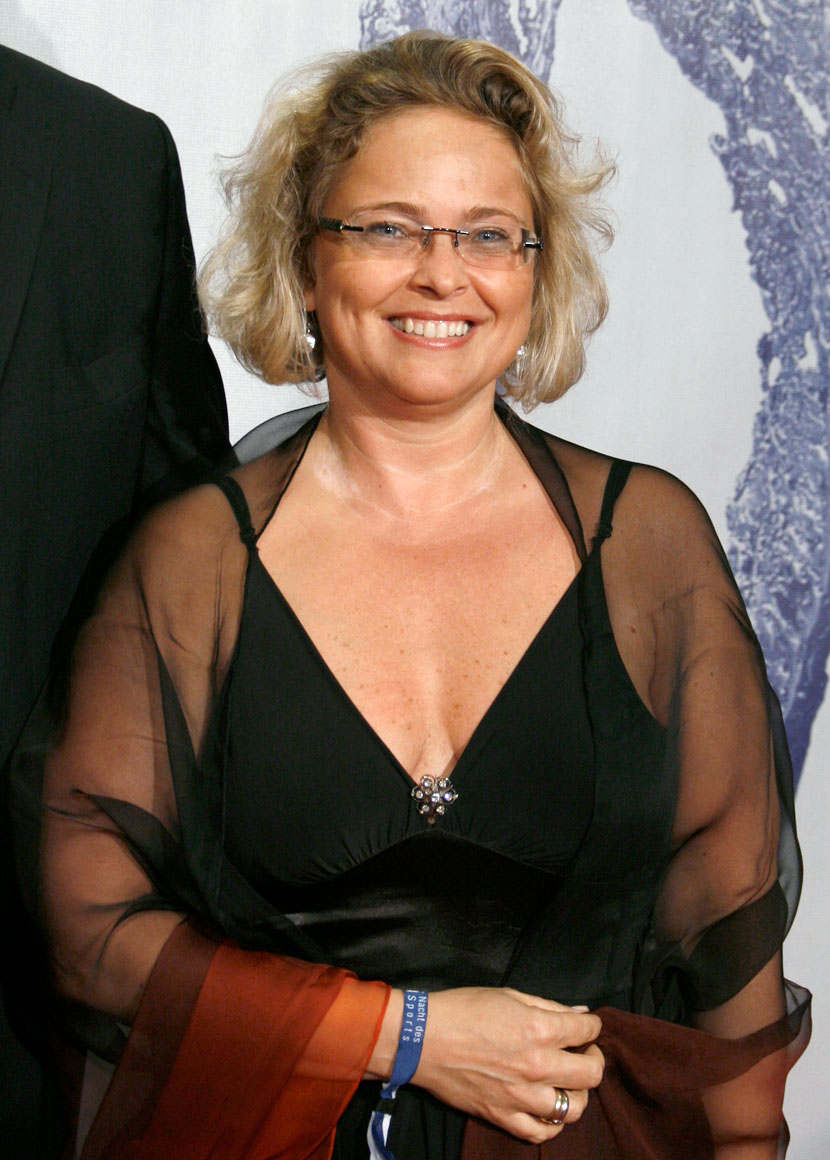
- Claudia Bandion-Ortner in 2009

Minister of Justice
- In office 15 January 2009 – 20 April 2011
- Prime Minister: Werner Faymann
- Preceded by: Johannes Hahn
- Succeeded by: Beatrix Karl

Personal details
- Born: 30 November 1966 (age 59) Graz
- Party: Independent
- Education: Karl-Franzens University
- Profession: Judge

Claudia Bandion-Ortner (born 30 November 1966) is an Austrian judge and politician, who served as the minister of justice.

== Early life and education ==
Bandion-Ortner was born in Graz on 30 November 1966. She graduated from Karl-Franzens University in Graz in 1989 with a master's degree in law.

== Career ==
Bandion-Ortner began her career as a judge at the regional court for criminal matters in Vienna. Then she became a chief judge. She was appointed minister of justice to the coalition cabinet led by Werner Faymann on 15 January 2009, replacing Johannes Hahn. Although she was an independent figure, the People's Party, partner of the Social Democratic Party in the coalition, nominated her for the post. Her tenure lasted until 20 April 2011 when she was resigned from office and she was succeeded by Beatrix Karl in the post.

After leaving office, Bandion-Ortner served as the senior advisor at the international anticorruption academy in Laxenburg, outside Vienna, from August 2011 to August 2012. In November 2012, Bandion-Ortner was appointed deputy secretary-general of the King Abdullah bin Abdulaziz international centre for interreligious and intercultural dialogue (KAICIID) that is based in Vienna.

== Personal life ==
Bandion-Ortner is married and has a child.
