= Wolfgang Sobotka =

Austrian politician

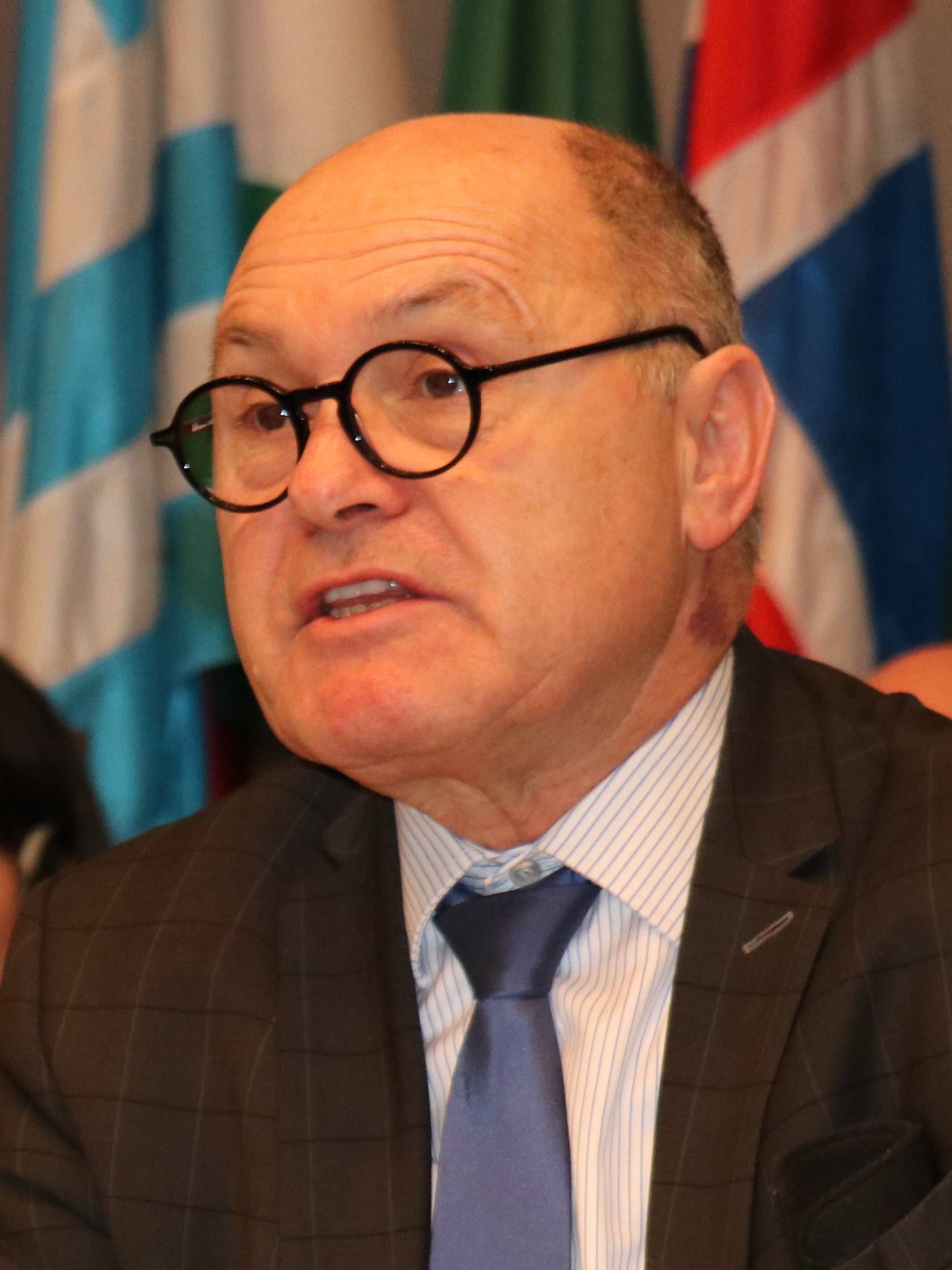
- Sobotka in 2024

President of the National Council
- In office 20 December 2017 – 23 October 2024
- Preceded by: Elisabeth Köstinger
- Succeeded by: Walter Rosenkranz

Minister of the Interior
- In office 21 April 2016 – 18 December 2017
- Chancellor: Werner Faymann; Christian Kern
- Preceded by: Johanna Mikl-Leitner
- Succeeded by: Herbert Kickl

Personal details
- Born: 5 January 1956 (age 69); Waidhofen an der Ybbs, Lower Austria, Austria
- Political party: People's Party

Wolfgang Sobotka (born 5 January 1956) is an Austrian politician of the Austrian People's Party (ÖVP) who served as the president of the Austrian National Council from 2017 until 2024.

== Early life and education ==
The son of a teacher, Sobotka studied history at the University of Vienna, cello and music education at the University of Music and Performing Arts Vienna, and conducting at the Bruckner Conservatory, Linz.

== Career ==
From 1972 to 1998, he first was a teacher at the local music school in his hometown Waidhofen an der Ybbs and then head of the school. From 1980 to 1987 he was a grammar school teacher. From 1980 to 1987, he held the office of city archivist in that town and from 1989 to 1998 was a lecturer at the University of Music and Performing Arts, Vienna.

=== Political career ===
His political career began in 1982 when he became a member of the Waidhofen town council. From 1988 to 1999 he was director of the town's music school; in 1989 he became the local party chairman; in 1992 he joined the city council; from 1992 to 1996, he was head of politics and education in the People's Party of Lower Austria; from 1996 to 1998 he was mayor of Waidhofen an der Ybbs; in 1998 he joined the provincial government of Lower Austria as treasurer; in February 2009 he was appointed Deputy Governor; in 2010 he became state chairman of the ÖAAB. Since 2011 he has been the regional head of the ÖVP sub-organization NÖAAB (Lower Austrian Workers' and Employees' Federation). Since 2013, he has been leading the educational work group of the ÖAAB.

When the cost of the State Garden Show in Tulln increased from the planned five million to 21 million euros, the state audit office and the opposition criticized Sobotka; the FPÖ and the Greens called for his resignation. In April 2009, Josef Leitner, who was then serving as deputy chairman of Lower Austria, criticized him because one billion of the 4.4 billion euros invested by that time had already been lost; in early June, Leitner stated that the loss amounted to 312 million euros. He initiated the successful action “Nature in the Garden” action and campaigned for the introduction of a commuter subsidy, called the commuter euro. Since 2012 he has been chairman of the advisory board of the Alois Mock Institute.

On 9 April 2016 it was announced that Sobotka would succeed Johanna Mikl-Leitner as Austrian Interior Minister. He assumed the post on 21 April, at which time Mikl-Leitner took Sobotka's position in the Lower Austrian state government. As Minister of the Interior, Sobotka was encouraged to pursue a tougher asylum policy and to enhance police powers. After the riots at the G20 summit in Hamburg, he demanded further tightening of the right to demonstrate. Citing the rising crime rate, he demanded a reduction of the number of asylum seekers permitted into Austria. In 2017, Sobotka presented a proposal for a security policy that would grant police access to surveillance cameras on the railways, highways, and Vienna metro and that would permit them to monitor modern online communication if necessary. The proposal failed, however, because of opposition by the Social Democrats (SPÖ).

A performance of Eine Kleine Nachtmusik played by the Cappella Istropolitana and conducted by Sobotka was used in Josef Hader’s 2017 film Wild Mouse.

In the 2017 National Council elections, he was ÖVP's top candidate for Lower Austria. On 20 December 2017, Sobotka was elected by the Austrian National Council as its First President.

From 1998 to 2016 Sobotka was a provincial councilor in Lower Austria and from 2009 to 2016 also held the office of deputy governor of Lower Austria.

From 2016 to 2017 Sobotka served as Austrian Federal Minister of the Interior in the governments of successive Chancellors Werner Faymann and Christian Kern.

=== Other activities ===
- National Fund of the Republic of Austria for Victims of National Socialism, Chair of the Board of Trustees (since 2017)

== Personal life ==
Sobotka had four children with his first wife, who died in 1999. He has two children and two stepchildren with his second wife.

== Honors ==
- 2004: Cross of Merit of the Austrian Red Cross
- 2016: Golden Commander's Cross with star for services to the province of Lower Austria
- Italy: Knight Grand Cross of the Order of Merit of the Italian Republic (10 February 2020)
