= Helga Konrad =

Austrian politician (1948–2024)

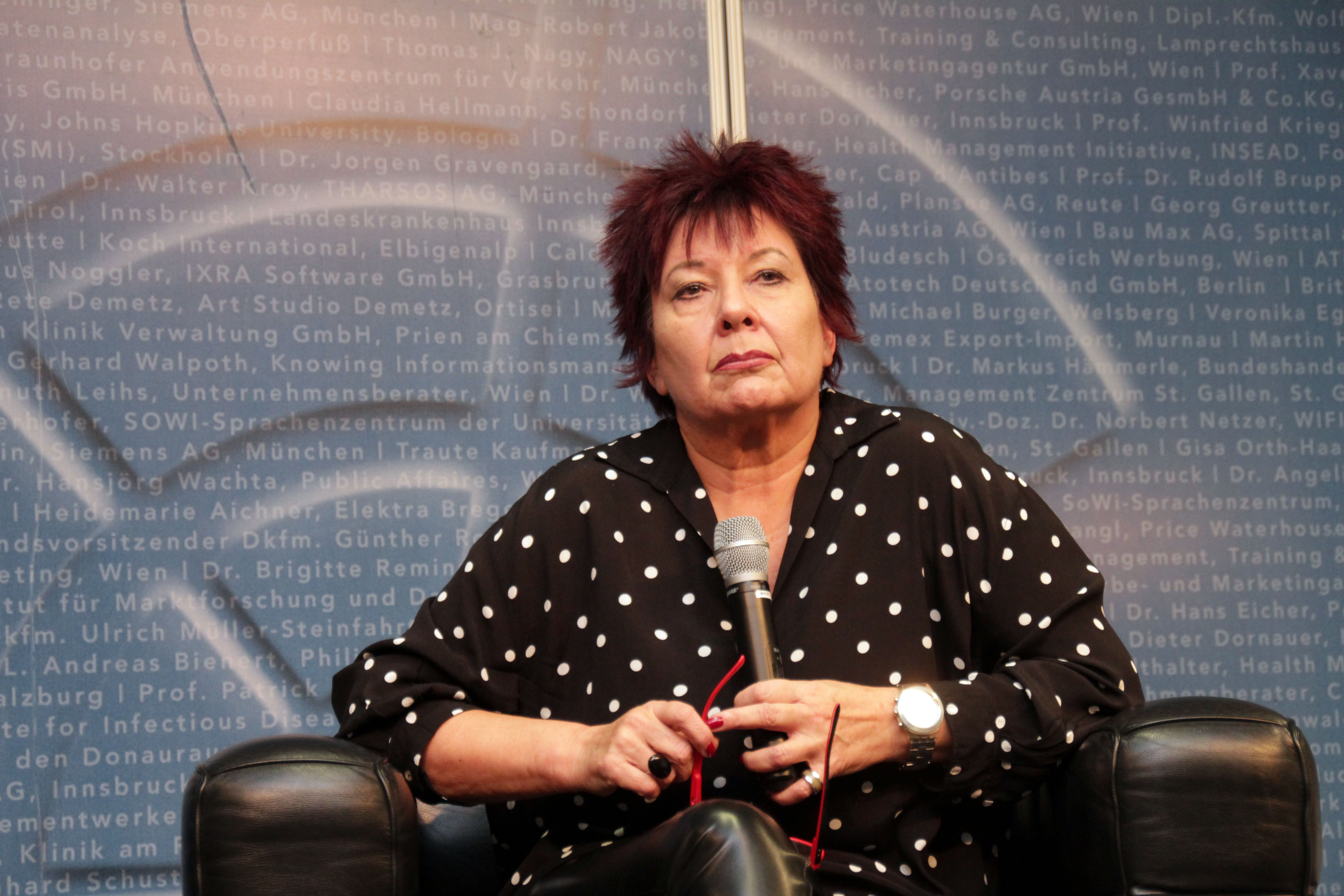
Konrad in 2016

Helga Konrad (10 January 1948 – 8 October 2024) was an Austrian politician.

== Life and career ==
Konrad was born and grew up in Graz. She studied English and Romance philology at the University of Graz and in Paris, completing a doctorate in 1975. She worked for the Chamber for Workers and Employees and later the Steirische Kulturinitiative.

She was a member of the Social Democratic Party of Austria (SPÖ), and in 1987 became a city councillor in Graz. She was elected to the National Council in the 1990 Austrian legislative election. Konrad briefly returned to local politics in Graz in 1993 until she succeeded Johanna Dohnal as Federal Minister for Women's Affairs in April 1995 on the government of Franz Vranitzky, remaining in office until the chancellor's resignation in 1997.

Konrad's most impactful project was a campaign to promote equal participation in household chores between genders. In 1999 Konrad received the Grand Decoration of Honour in Silver with Star for Services to the Republic of Austria.

Konrad was considered an expert on combating human trafficking. From 2000 until 2004 she led a Stability Pact for South Eastern Europe task force against human trafficking, and in 2004 was appointed the Organization for Security and Co-operation in Europe's special representative for the issue.

Konrad died on 8 October 2024, at the age of 76.
