= Claudia Schmied =

Austrian politician (born 1959)

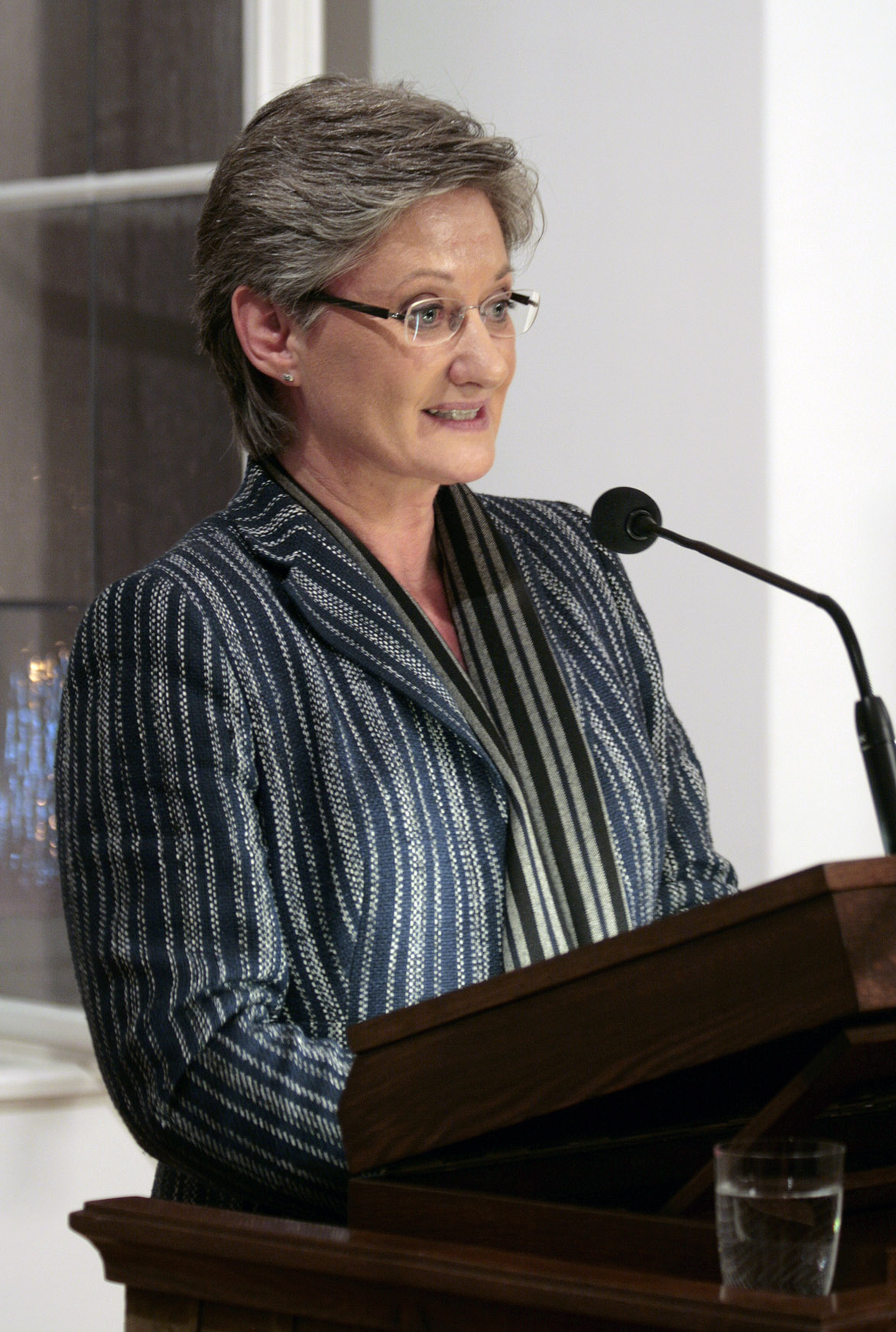

Personal details
- Born: May 10, 1959 (age 66) Vienna, Austria

Claudia Schmied (May 10, 1959) is an Austrian politician, a member of the Social Democratic Party of Austria.

She was born in Vienna and attended elementary school and secondary school there. Schmied went on to study business administration at the Vienna University of Economics and Business. She worked at the Investkredit Bank AG from 1983 to 1997. From 1997 to 1999, she was a policy advisor to the German Minister of Finance Rudolf Edlinger. From 2000 to 2004, she was head of the finance department at Investkredit Bank AG. She served on the board of Kommunalkredit Austria from 2004 to 2007 and on the board of Dexia Kommunalkredit Bank AG from 2005 to 2007. She also was a lecturer at the Vienna University of Economics and Business.

Schmied was Minister of Education, the Arts and Cultural Affairs from 2007 to 2013, serving in the Gusenbauer government and then the first Faymann government. At the end of September 2013, she announced her decision to leave politics.
