= Reinhold Lopatka =

Austrian politician (born 1960)

Reinhold Lopatka MEP
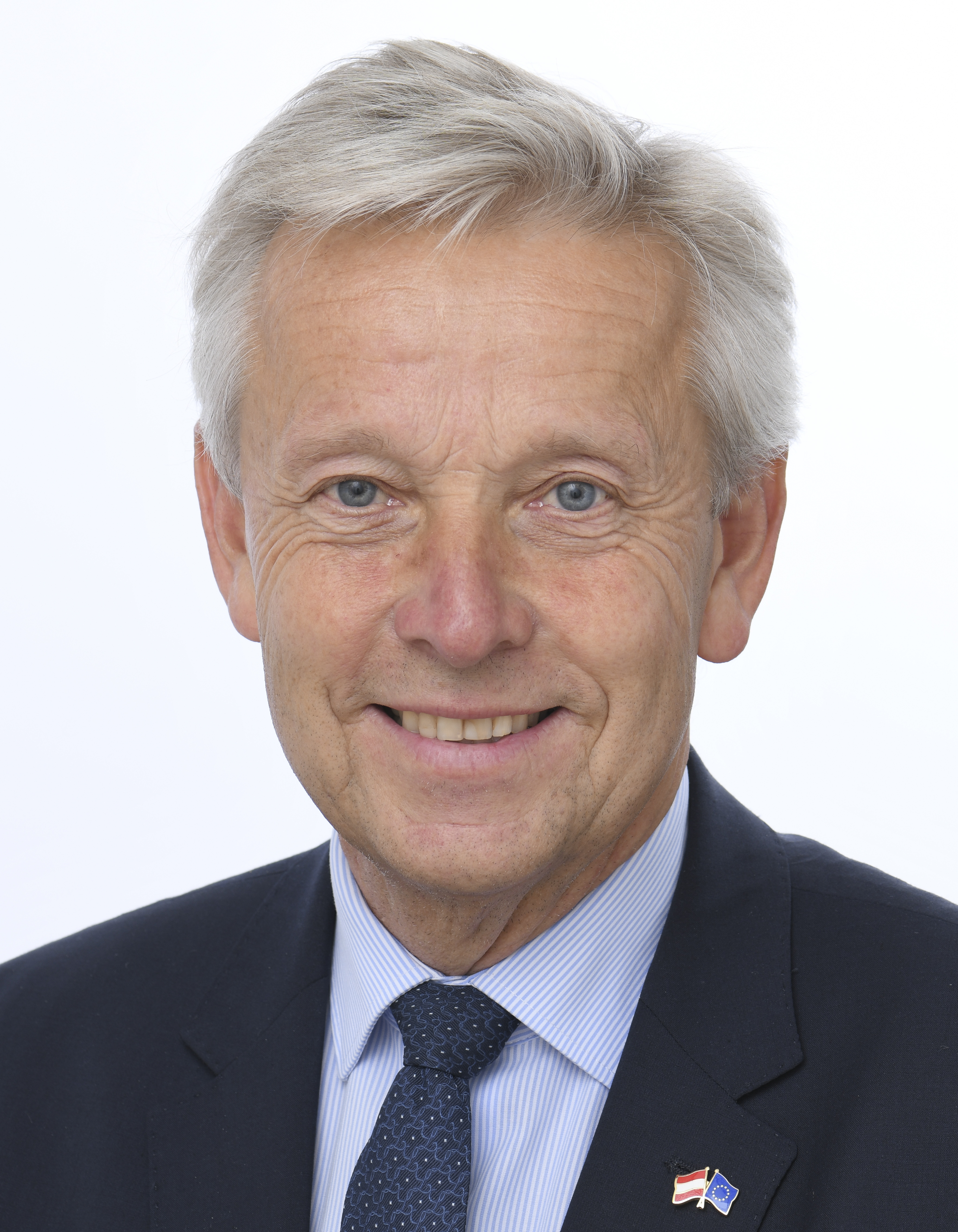
- Official portrait, 2024

Member of the European Parliament for Austria
- Incumbent
- Assumed office 16 July 2024

Member of the National Council
- In office 29 October 2013 – 2 July 2024
- Constituency: Styria

Personal details
- Born: 27 January 1960 (age 66) Vorau, Styria
- Party: ÖVP

Reinhold Lopatka (born 27 January 1960) is an Austrian politician of the Austrian People's Party (ÖVP) who has been serving as a member of the European Parliament since the 2024 European Parliament election in Austria. He led the ÖVP list in the elections.

== Early life ==
Reinhold Lopatka was born in Vorau.

After elementary school in Dechantskirchen, Reinhold Lopatka attended the modern language high school in Oberschützen, where he graduated in 1978. In 1982, after studying law and theology at the University of Graz, Lopatka received his doctorate in law. Already active as a school and student representative during his youth and university years, he was finally elected to the Styrian state parliament in 1986.

== Political career ==
=== Member of the Austrian Parliament, 2003–2024 ===
From 1993 to 2001, Lopatka was the Styrian ÖVP regional manager, and from 2000 to 2003 he was the parliamentary group leader of the Styrian ÖVP in the state parliament. For the 2002 legislative election he managed the election campaign for the federal ÖVP; the party made significant gains (15.2 percent more votes than in 1999) and once again became the party with the most seats in the National Council. Wolfgang Schüssel, then federal party leader of the ÖVP, brought Lopatka into the federal party and appointed him General Secretary in 2003. In the same year he was elected as a member of the National Council.

Lopatka would be re-elected in 2006, 2008, 2013, 2017 and 2019.

In addition to his role in parliament, Lopatka served as a member of the Austrian delegation to the Parliamentary Assembly of the Council of Europe from 2020 to 2024. In the Assembly, he was a member of the Committee on Political Affairs and Democracy, the Sub-Committee on External Relations and the Sub-Committee on the Middle East and the Arab World.

Lopatka also led the Organization for Security and Co-operation in Europe (OSCE) observer mission for the 2023 Serbian parliamentary election.

=== Member of the European Parliament, 2024–present ===
Within the European People’s Party group, Lopatka has been heading the Austrian delegation. Lopatka was part of the European Parliament’s observer mission in the 2024 Georgian parliamentary election.

In February 2025, Lopatka would state that "Austrian MEPs should not be the voice of Putin in the European Parliament", referring to the FPÖ.

=== Committees and Delegations ===
==== 10th European Parliament ====
- Delegation for relations with the Arab Peninsula
- Conference of Delegation Chairs
- Committee on Foreign Affairs
- Committee on Development
- Subcommittee on Human Rights
- Delegation for relations with the countries of Central America, including the EU-Central America Association Parliamentary Committee
- Delegation to the Euro-Latin American Parliamentary Assembly

== Controversy ==
In 2013, Lopatka and Wilhelm Molterer were suspects in a corruption investigation into allegations the ÖVP may have used Telekom Austria funds for illegal party financing in the 2008 elections.

== Personal life ==
Lopatka has been married since 1983 and has three sons. His brother Eduard Lopatka is a doctor and also supervised the team of the Austrian Ski Association (ÖSV).
