= Walter Rosenkranz =

Austrian politician (born 1962)

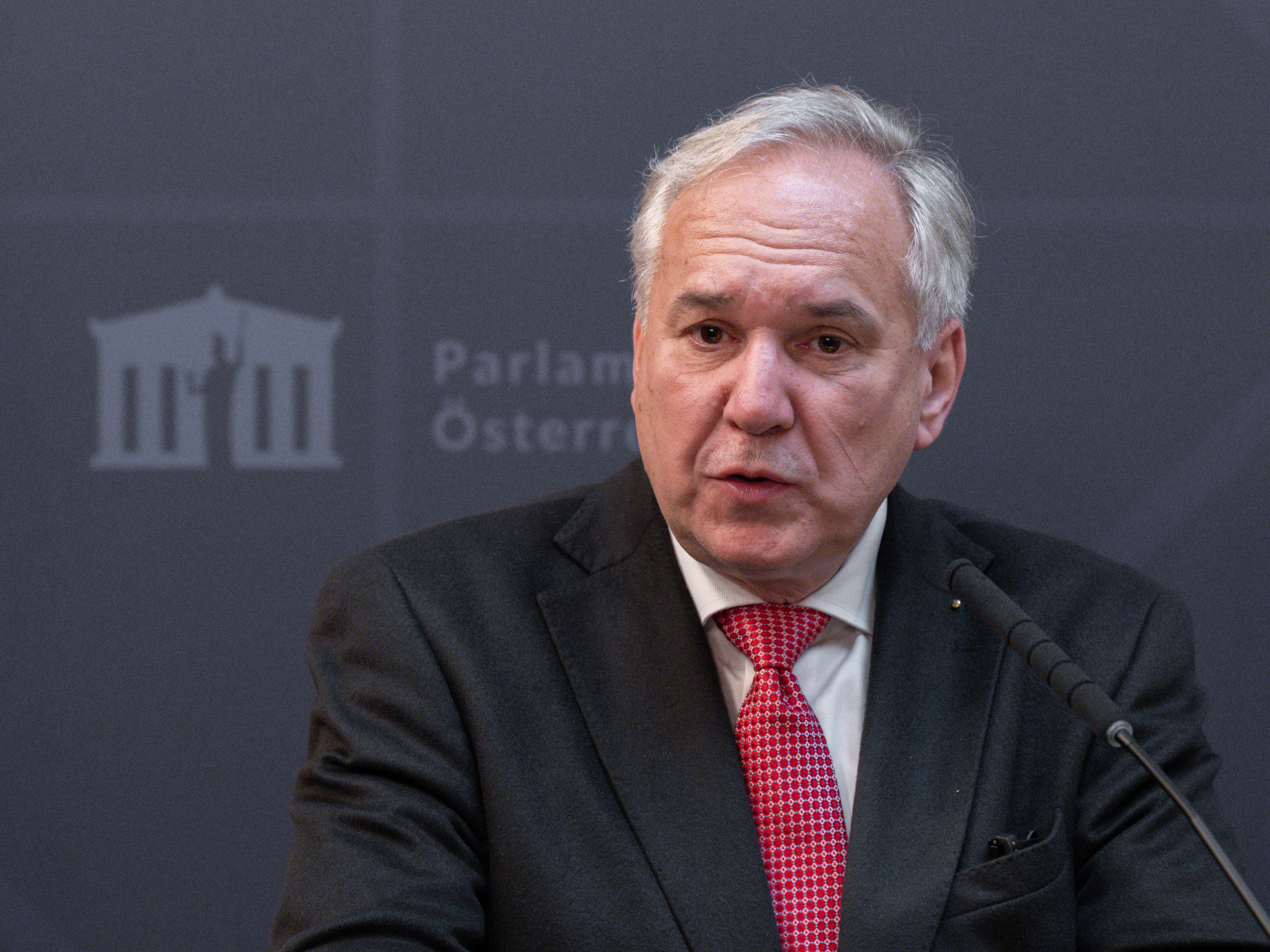
- Rosenkranz in 2025

President of the National Council
- Incumbent
- Assumed office 24 October 2024
- Preceded by: Wolfgang Sobotka

Member of the Ombudsman Board
- In office 1 July 2019 – 23 October 2024 Serving with Bernhard Achitz, Werner Amon, Gaby Schwarz
- Preceded by: Peter Fichtenbauer
- Succeeded by: Elisabeth Schwetz

Personal details
- Born: 29 July 1962 (age 63) Krems an der Donau, Lower Austria, Austria
- Party: Freedom Party

Walter Rosenkranz (born 29 July 1962) is an Austrian far-right politician and lawyer who has served as President of the National Council since October 2024.

Rosenkranz was a member of the National Council for the Freedom Party of Austria (FPÖ) from 2008 to 2019, when he became one of three national public advocates (Volksanwalt). He was also parliamentary group leader of the FPÖ in the National Council between 2017 and 2019 and served as leader of the Lower Austrian FPÖ.

On 12 July 2022, the FPÖ selected Rosenkranz as its official candidate for the 2022 Austrian presidential election, to be held on 9 October 2022, but lost to incumbent Austrian president Alexander Van der Bellen. He is not related to Barbara Rosenkranz, FPÖ candidate for president in the 2010 Austrian presidential election.

On 24 October 2024, Rosenkranz was elected President of the National Council with a majority of 61,7 percent, becoming the first representative of the FPÖ to ever occupy this position.
