= Karlheinz Kopf =

Austrian politician (born 1957)

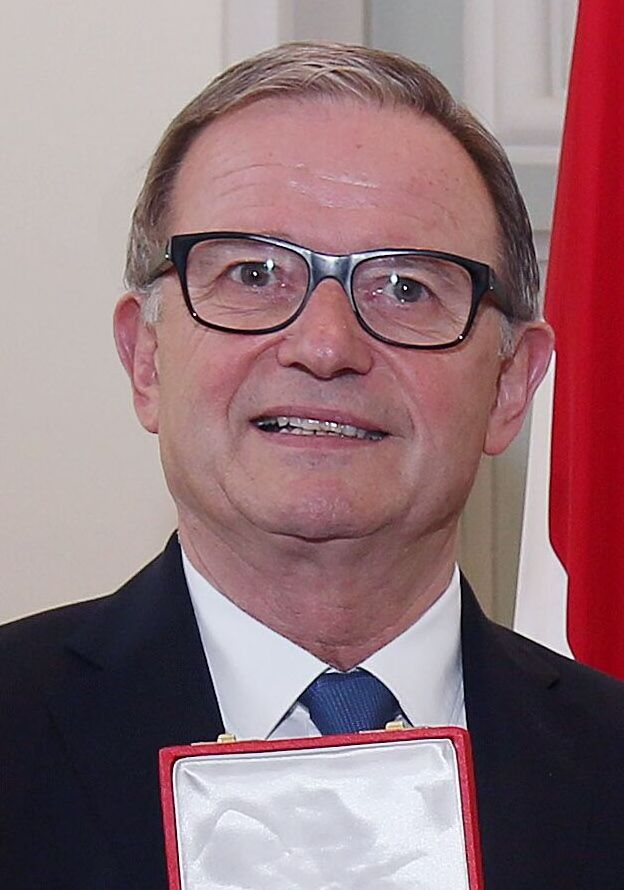
- Kopf in 2017

Second President of the National Council
- In office 29 October 2013 – 8 November 2017
- Preceded by: Fritz Neugebauer
- Succeeded by: Doris Bures

Personal details
- Born: 27 June 1957 (age 68) Hohenems, Austria
- Party: People's Party

Karlheinz Kopf (born 27 June 1957 in Hohenems, Vorarlberg) is an Austrian politician of the conservative People's Party (ÖVP).

From 2013 to 2017, he was Second President of the National Council. On 8 July 2016, when Austrian president Heinz Fischer left office, the position of Acting President fell jointly to the three presidents of the National Council – Kopf, Norbert Hofer (Freedom Party), and Doris Bures (Social Democratic Party). Alexander Van der Bellen was elected President on 4 December 2016, receiving support from 53.3% of voters and defeating Hofer. Hofer, Kopf, and Bures served as joint acting president until Van der Bellen was sworn into office, which took place on 26 January 2017.

== Honours ==
- Liechtenstein: Grand Cross with Diamonds of the Order of Merit of the Principality of Liechtenstein (2017)
- Knight of Honor of the Order of St. George.
