= Christine Marek =

Austrian politician (born 1968)

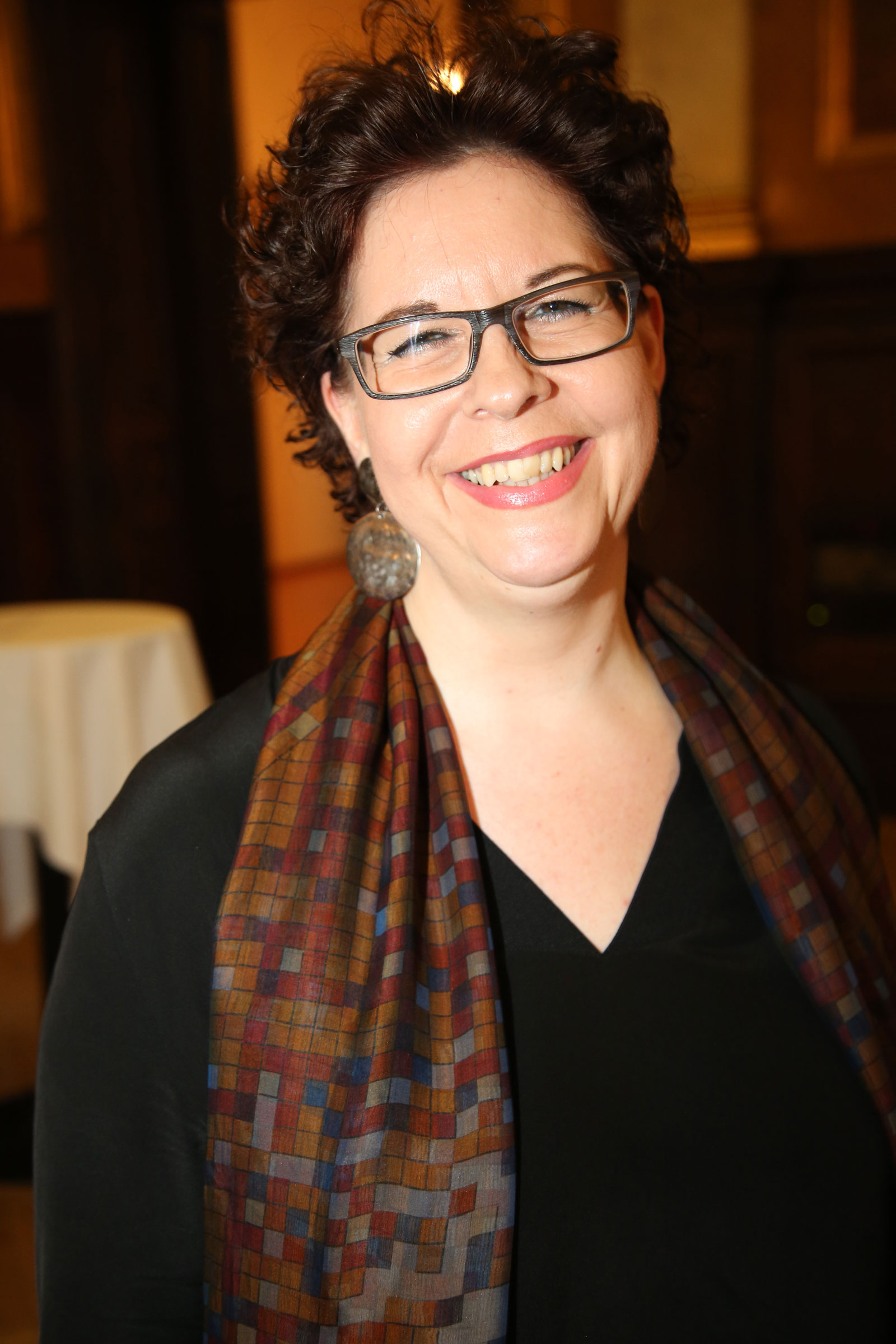

State Secretary of Economy and Labour
- In office 1 January 2007 – 26 November 2010
- Chancellor: Alfred Gusenbauer
- Minister: Martin Bartenstein; Reinhold Mitterlehner

Chairwoman of the Viennese People's Party
- In office 13 March 2010 – 9 September 2011

Personal details
- Born: 26 January 1968 (age 57); Kempten, Allgäu, Swabia, Bavaria, Germany
- Political party: People's Party

Christine Marek (born 26 January 1968) is an Austrian politician who served as state secretary of the Ministry of Economy and Labour from January 2007 to November 2010 under the Gusenbauer cabinet. Additionally, she was the first woman to serve as chair of the Viennese People's Party.
