= Fritz Neugebauer =

President of the National Council of Austria

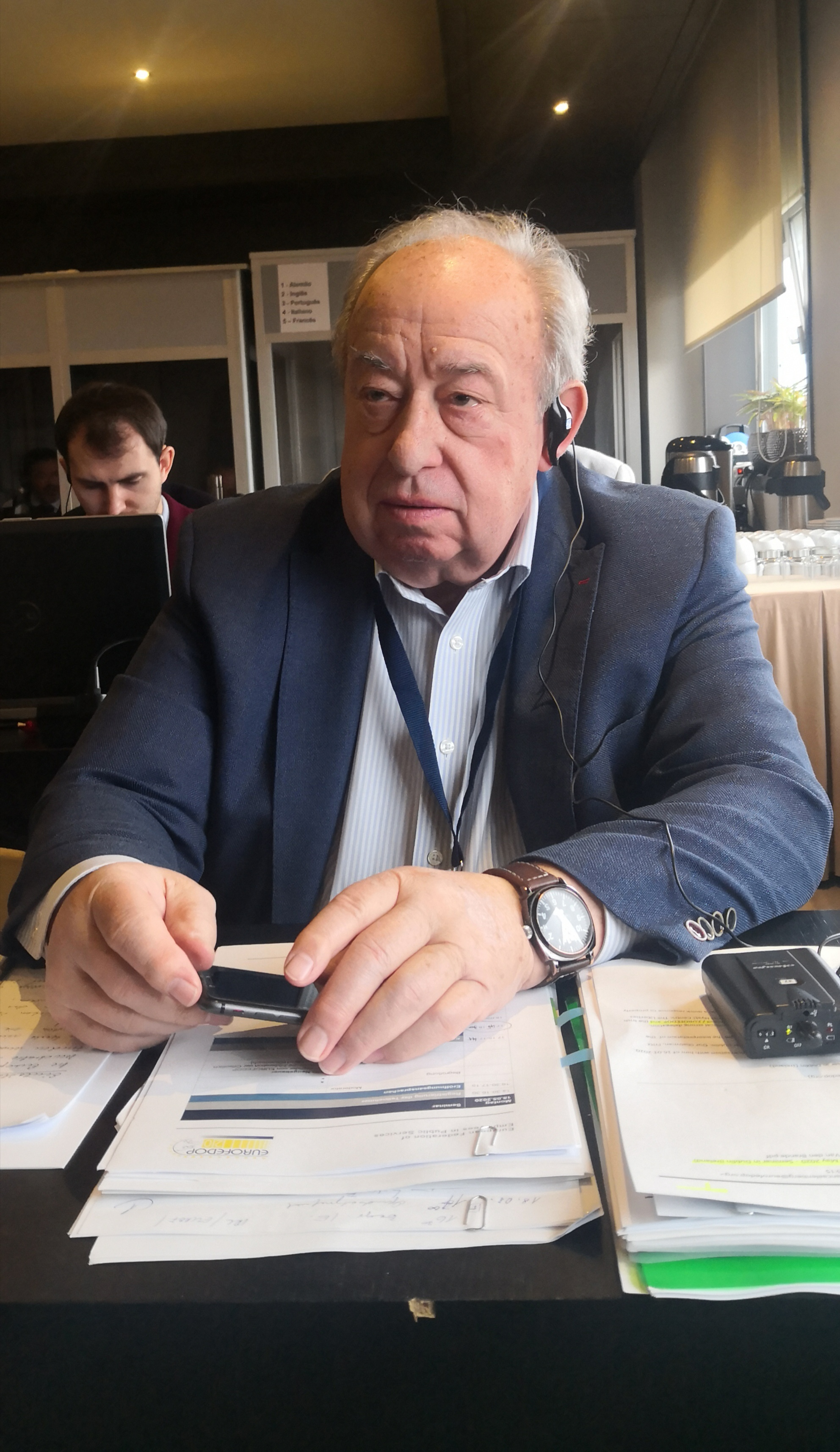
- Fritz Neugebauer in EZA Seminar, 30 January to 1 February 2020, Porto, Portugal. Workers rights and employment conditions: Towards a new European inspection authority for fair, simple and effective enforcement of European rules on labour mobility.

Second President of the National Council of Austria
- In office December 3, 2008 – October 29, 2013

Member of the National Council of Austria
- Incumbent
- Assumed office December 20, 2002
- In office September 2, 1999 – October 28, 1999
- In office January 15, 1996 – October 1, 1996

Personal details
- Born: October 10, 1944 (age 81) Vienna, Nazi Germany (now Austria)
- Party: Austrian People's Party

Military service
- Branch/service: Austrian Army
- Years of service: 1964-1965

Fritz Neugebauer was the Second President of the National Council of Austria from 2008 to 2013.

== Career ==
Neugebauer has been a member of the National Council three times. First, in 1996, second, in 1999, and third, since 2002. In 2008, he became Second President of the National Council. He is also Chairman of the Committee for European Union Affairs in the Parliament of Austria and President of the European Confederation of Independent Trade Unions.
