= Desertion =

Abandonment of military duty without authorization

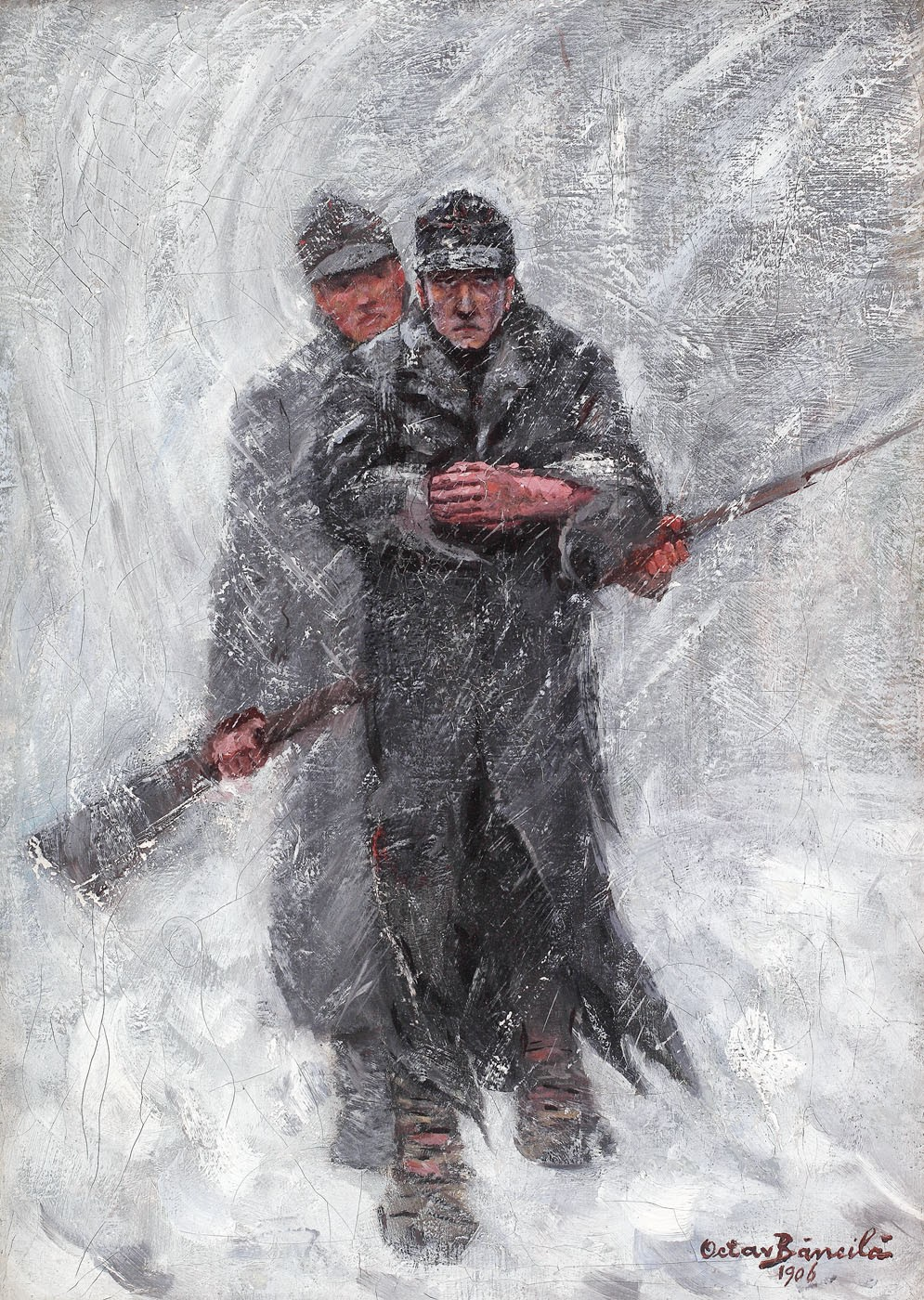
The Defector, by Octav Băncilă, 1906

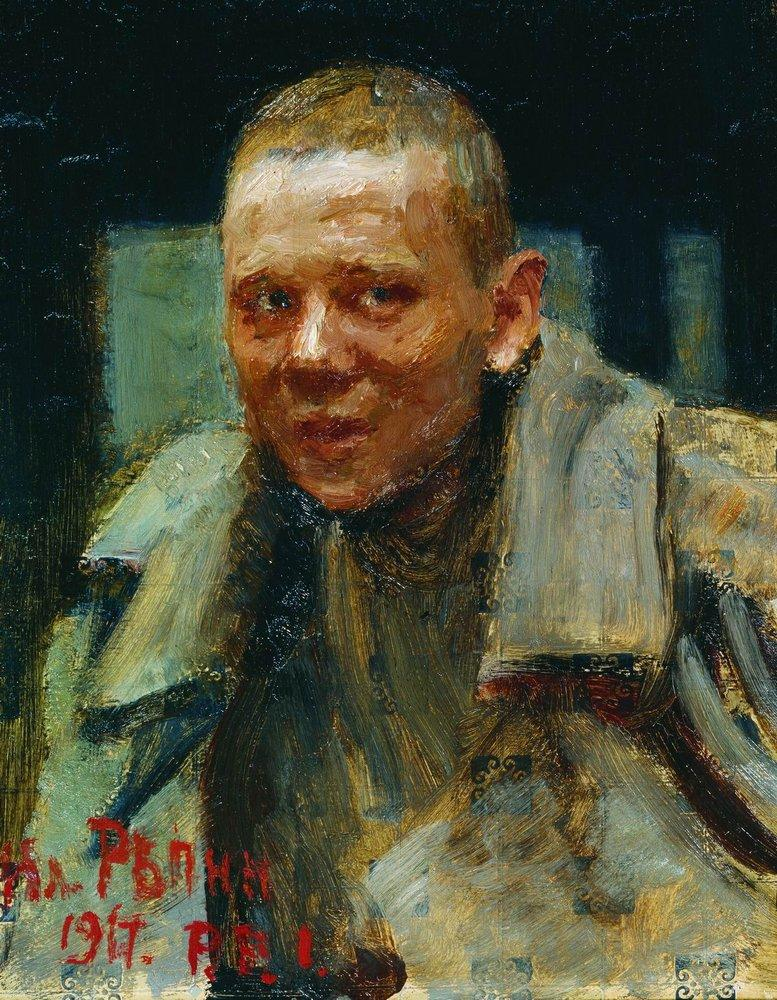
Deserteur (Дезертир), by Ilya Repin, 1917

Desertion is the abandonment of a military duty or post without permission (a pass, liberty or leave) and is done with the intention of not returning. This contrasts with unauthorized absence (UA) or absence without leave (AWOL /ˈeɪwɒl/), which are temporary forms of absence.

== Desertion versus absence without leave ==
In the United States Army, United States Air Force, British Armed Forces, Australian Defence Force, New Zealand Defence Force, Singapore Armed Forces and Canadian Armed Forces, military personnel will become AWOL if absent from their post without a valid pass, liberty or leave. The United States Marine Corps, United States Navy, and United States Coast Guard generally refer to this as unauthorized absence. Personnel are dropped from their unit rolls after thirty days and then listed as deserters; however, as a matter of U.S. military law, desertion is not measured by time away from the unit, but rather:

- by leaving or remaining absent from their unit, organization, or place of duty, where there has been a determined intent to not return;
- if that intent is determined to be to avoid hazardous duty or shirk contractual obligation;
- if they enlist or accept an appointment in the same or another branch of service without disclosing the fact that they have not been properly separated from current service.

People who are away for more than thirty days but return voluntarily or indicate a credible intent to return may still be considered AWOL. Those who are away for fewer than thirty days but can credibly be shown to have no intent to return (for example, by joining the armed forces of another country) may nevertheless be tried for desertion. On rare occasions, they may be tried for treason if enough evidence is found.

There are similar concepts to desertion. Missing movement occurs when a member of the armed forces fails to arrive at the appointed time and place to deploy (or "move out") with their assigned unit, ship, or aircraft. In the United States Armed Forces, this is a violation of the Article 87 of the Uniform Code of Military Justice (UCMJ). The offense is similar to absence without leave but may draw more severe punishment.

Failure to repair consists of missing a formation or failing to appear at an assigned place and time when so ordered. It is a lesser offense within Article 86 of the UCMJ.

An additional duty status code — absent-unknown, or AUN — was established by the U.S. military in 2020 to prompt unit actions and police investigations during the first 48 hours that a service member is missing.

== By country ==
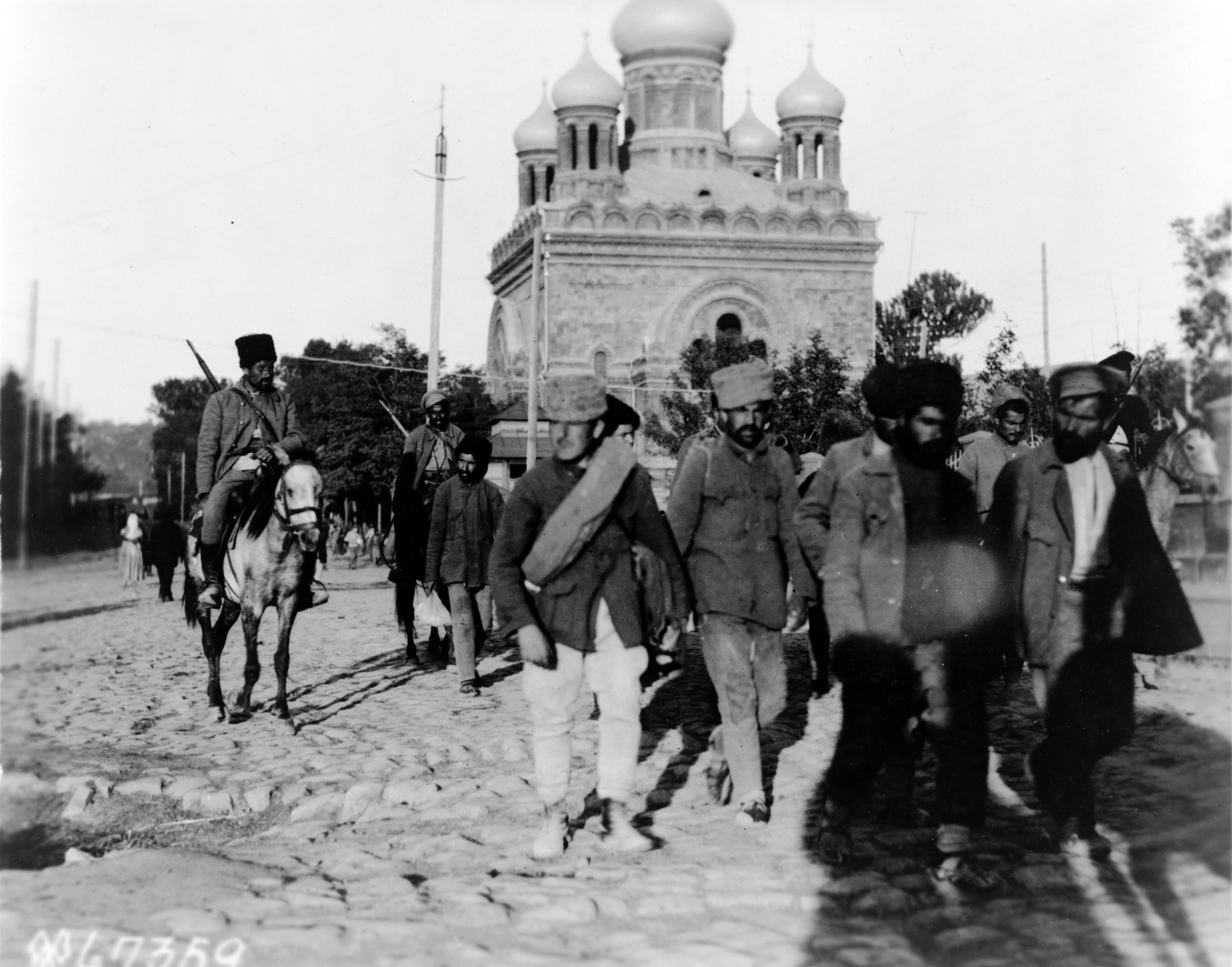
Armenian soldiers in 1919, with deserters as prisoners

=== Australia ===
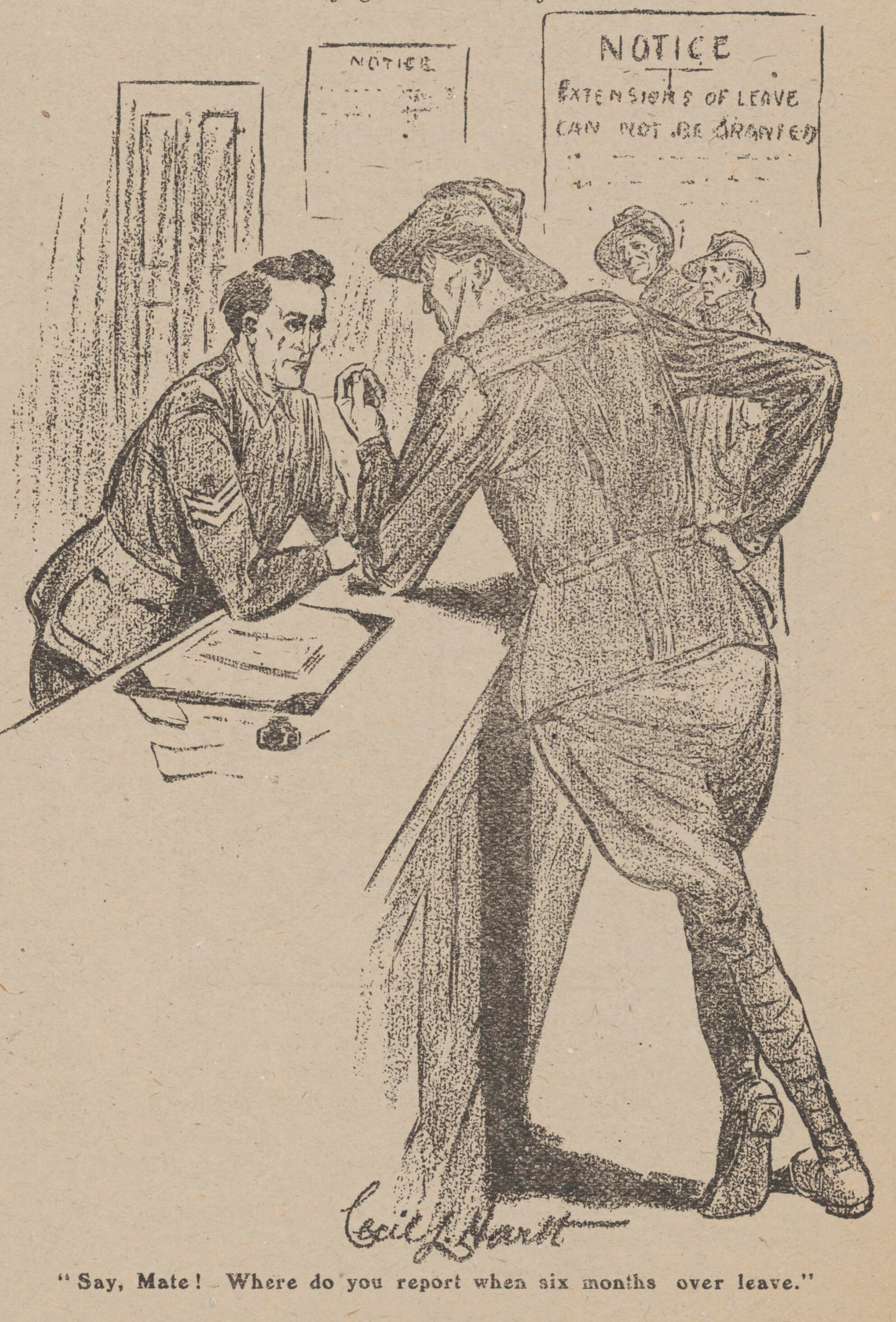
A 1918 cartoon by Cecil Hartt making light of the high incidence of soldiers going absent without leave in the Australian Imperial Force

During the First World War, the Australian Government refused to allow members of the First Australian Imperial Force (AIF) to be executed for desertion, despite pressure from the British Government and military to do so. The AIF had the highest rate of soldiers going absent without leave of any of the national contingents in the British Expeditionary Force, and the proportion of soldiers who deserted was also higher than that of other forces on the Western Front in France.

=== Austria ===
In 2011, Vienna decided to honour Austrian Wehrmacht deserters. On 24 October 2014, a Memorial for the Victims of Nazi Military Justice was inaugurated on Vienna's Ballhausplatz by Austria's President Heinz Fischer. The monument was created by German artist Olaf Nicolai and is located opposite the President's office and the Austrian Chancellery. The inscription on top of the three step sculpture features a poem by Scottish poet Ian Hamilton Finlay (1924–2006) with just two words: all alone.

=== Afghanistan ===
A quarter of ANA and ANSF troops were reported to have deserted in 2009 with many troops hiding in the heat of battle rather than engaging the enemy. Following the fall of Kabul in August 2021, the remaining forces of the ANA either deserted their posts or surrendered to the Taliban.

=== Canada ===
During World War I, the Canadian Expeditionary Force passed more than 200 death sentences on deserters. Only 25 men were actually executed.

Per the National Defence Act, "every person who deserts or attempts to desert is guilty of an offence and on conviction, if the person committed the offence on active service or under orders for active service, is liable to imprisonment for life or to less punishment and, in any other case, is liable to imprisonment for a term not exceeding five years or to less punishment".

=== Colombia ===
In Colombia, the Revolutionary Armed Forces of Colombia (Spanish: FARC) insurgency were highly affected by desertion during the armed conflict with the Military Forces of Colombia. The Colombian Ministry of Defense reported 19,504 deserters from the FARC between August 2002 and their collective demobilization in 2017, despite potentially severe punishment, including execution, for attempted desertion in the FARC. Organizational decline contributed to FARC's high desertion rate which peaked in the year 2008. A later stalemate between the FARC and government forces gave rise to the Colombian peace process.

=== France ===
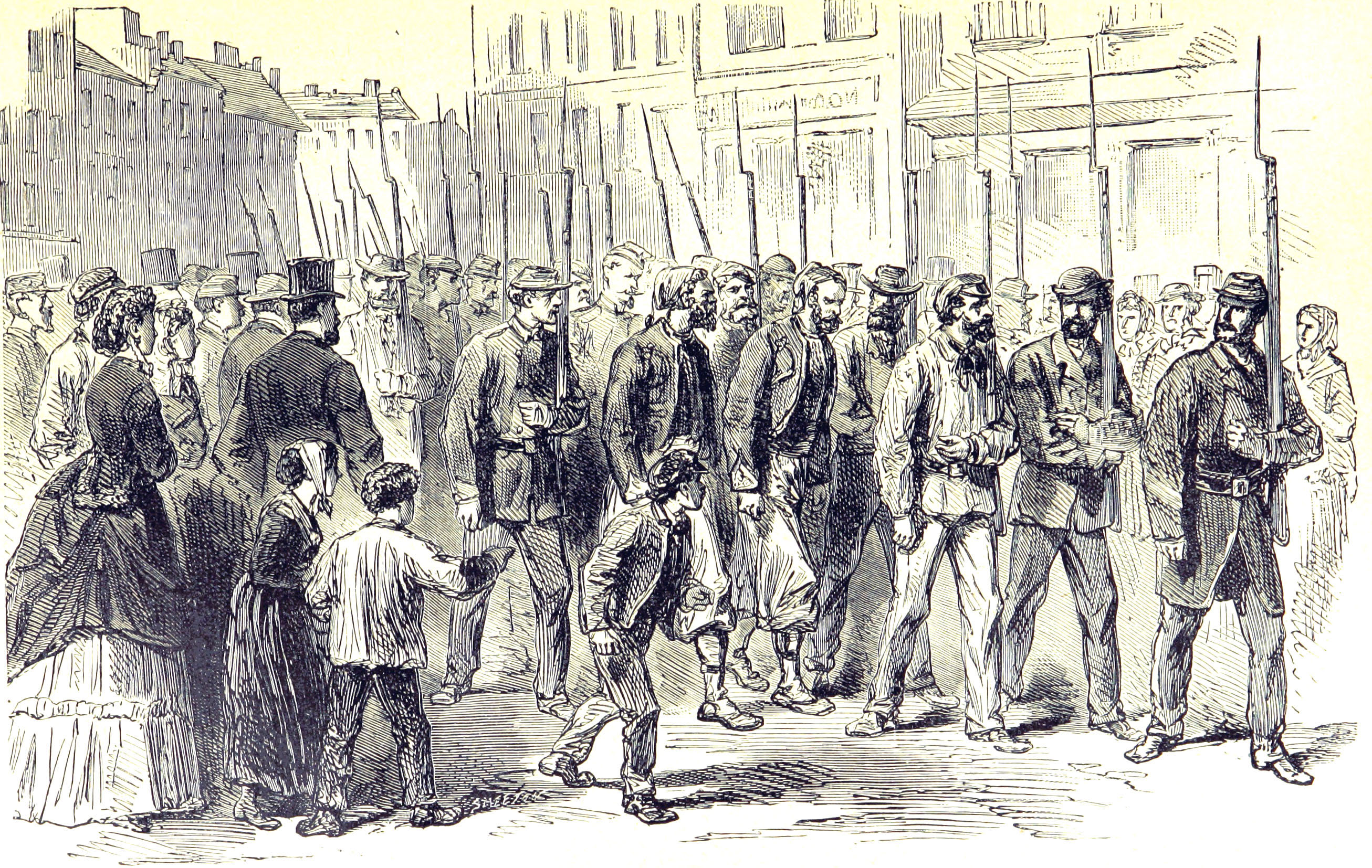
"Convoy of Deserters – Paris" in the book Cassell's History of the War between France and Germany. 1870–1871

Many individuals who were conscripted by the French First Republic during the French Revolutionary Wars deserted. There were rough estimates to the number of individuals that deserted during the time of the levée en masse, but due to many factors, like the inability to manage and keep track of all the armies or differentiating between men with similar names, the exact number is unclear. In 1800, the Minister of War (Carnot) reported that there were 175,000 deserters based on the number of individuals that sought the benefits following the amnesty put in place.

From 1914 to 1918 between 600 and 650 French soldiers were executed for desertion. In 2013, a report for the French Ministry of Veteran Affairs recommended that they be pardoned.

Conversely, France considered as highly praiseworthy the act of citizens of Alsace-Lorraine who during WWI deserted from the German army. After the war it was decided to award all such deserters the Escapees' Medal (French: Médaille des Évadés).

During the First Indochina War (1946–54), the French Foreign Legion was deployed to fight the Vietnamese insurgency. Some of the legionnaires, such as Stefan Kubiak, deserted and began fighting for the Việt Minh and People's Army of Vietnam upon witnessing torture of Vietnamese peasants at the hands of French troops.

=== Germany ===
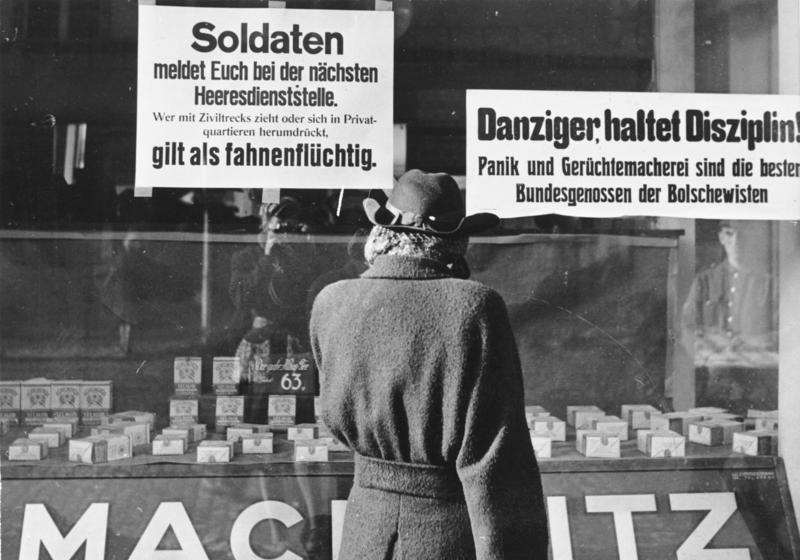
German street posters in Danzig as the Red Army approached in February 1945, warning soldiers that escaping with civilians will be treated as desertion

During the First World War, only 18 Germans who deserted were executed. However, the Germans executed 15,000 men who deserted from the Wehrmacht during the Second World War. In June 1988 the Initiative for the Creation of a Memorial to Deserters who deserted the Wehrmacht came to life in Ulm.

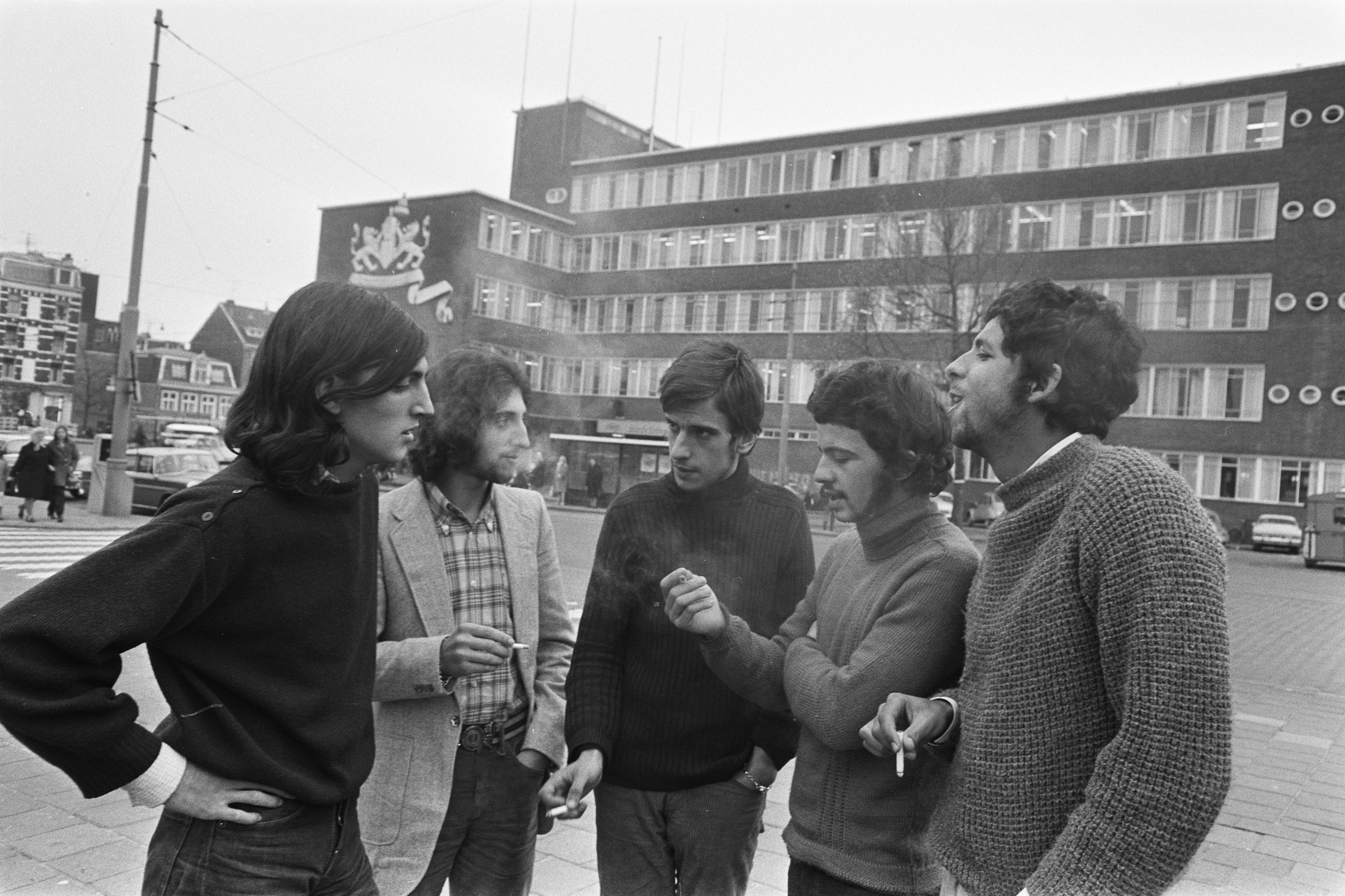
Deserters from the Portuguese Army during the Portuguese Colonial War in Africa, Amsterdam, 1969

=== Ireland ===
Ireland was neutral during the Second World War; the Irish Army expanded to 40,000 men, but they had little to do once it became clear in 1942 that invasion (either by Nazi Germany or by the British Empire) was unlikely. Soldiers were put to work cutting trees and peat; morale was low and pay was bad. Of the 60,000 men who passed through the army in 1940–45, about 7,000 men deserted, about half of them deciding to fight on the Allied side, most joining the British Army.

Once the war was over, the EPO 362 order meant deserters were allowed to return to Ireland; they were not imprisoned, but lost rights to an army pension and could not work for the state or claim unemployment benefits for seven years. They were also seen as traitors by some Irish people in their homes.

Decades after, the morality of their actions was debated; on the one hand, they had illegally abandoned their country's armed forces at a time when it was threatened with invasion — indeed, it was argued that their acts were treasonous at a time when Britain may have been planning to seize control of Ireland's ports (see Plan W); on the other hand, they chose to leave a safe if tedious posting in order to risk their lives fighting against fascism, and many were motivated by genuine idealism.

In 2012, the Minister for Justice and Equality Alan Shatter issued a pardon and amnesty to all World War II–era deserters from the Irish Defence Forces.

=== Italy ===
During World War I, 15,096 Italians served life sentences and around 750 were executed (391 by firing squad) for deserting from the military; the Roman punishment of decimation was claimed to have been used. In 1918, Italy agreed to pardon all deserters, who, after their conscription in their military, joined the United States Army, affecting thousands. In total, about 128,000 desertion cases took place due to the First World War in Italy. In Italy during the Napoleonic Wars, about 40,000 soldiers deserted from the military, with Alessandro Trivulzio, Italy's Ministry of War of the Kingdom, describing desertion as a "destructive worm". To halt desertion, in 1808, the Italian government created the consigli di guerra speciali, a group of military courts.

=== New Zealand ===
During the First World War, 28 New Zealand soldiers were sentenced to death for desertion; of these, five were executed. These soldiers were posthumously pardoned in 2000 through the Pardon for Soldiers of the Great War Act. Those who deserted before reaching the front were imprisoned in what were claimed to be harsh conditions.

=== Rhodesia ===
The Rhodesian government did not have a formal mechanism to track down men who did not report for the national service and conscription scheme. While desertion could be punished by death, this was not enforced. Most Rhodesian Security Forces officers were not concerned about men in their units evading call ups or deserting. As late as 1977 the Army did not keep records of men who deserted. The heavy burden conscription placed on the white minority during the final years of the Rhodesian Bush War led to many white people emigrating. This undermined the Rhodesian government's war effort and contributed to the transition to majority rule, with the country becoming Zimbabwe in 1980.

=== Russia ===
During the 2022 Russian mobilization, the Putin-controlled State Duma of Russia adopted amendments to include the concepts of mobilization, martial law and wartime in the Criminal Code, and introduced several articles related to military operations. Desertion during a period of mobilization or wartime will be punished by up to 10 years in jail. In December 2022, Kazakhstan deported back to Russia a Russian officer who was trying to avoid the Russo-Ukrainian war.

Russian independent media outlet Mediazona reported that military courts have received thousands of AWOL cases since Russia's 2022 mobilization. Pro Asyl estimated that 250,000 Russian conscripts have fled to other countries since February 2022. As of 2024, France was the only EU country accepting Russian deserters without a passport and allowing them to apply for asylum. There is a distinction however between potential conscripts who could be conscripted if they stayed in Russia (the german court ruled that they faced virtually no risk of being sent to fight in Russia's war in Ukraine) and active duty contract soldiers and officers who desert from the war.

According to leaked Russian documents, more than 50,000 Russian soldiers deserted during the Russian invasion of Ukraine, mostly in 2023 and 2024.

=== Somalia ===
The Somali Transitional Federal Government (TFG) suffered from mass desertions during the Ethiopian military occupation (2007–2009). In December 2008 the United Nations reported that more than 80% of the army and police, about 15,000 men - had deserted.

=== Soviet Union ===
==== Russian Civil War ====
In 1919, 616 "hardcore" deserters of the total 837,000 draft dodgers and deserters were executed following People's Commissar Leon Trotsky's draconian measures. According to Figes, "a majority of deserters (most registered as 'weak-willed') were handed back to the military authorities, and formed into units for transfer to one of the rear armies or directly to the front". Even those registered as "malicious" deserters were returned to the ranks when the demand for reinforcements became desperate". Figes also noted that the Red Army instituted amnesty weeks to prohibit punitive measures against desertion which encouraged the voluntary return of 98,000-132,000 deserters to the army.

==== World War II ====
Order No. 270, dated 16 August 1941, was issued by Joseph Stalin. The order required superiors to shoot deserters on the spot. Their family members were subjected to arrest. Order No. 227, dated 28 July 1942, directed that each Army must create "blocking detachments" (barrier troops) which would shoot "cowards" and fleeing panicked troops at the rear. Over the course of the war, the Soviets executed 158,000 troops for desertion.

==== Soviet–Afghan War ====
Many Soviet soldier deserters of the Soviet–Afghan War explain their reasons for desertion as political and in response to internal disorganization and disillusionment regarding their position in the war. Analyses of desertion rates argue that motivations were far less ideological than individual accounts claim. Desertion rates increased prior to announcements of upcoming operations, and were highest during the summer and winter. Seasonal desertions were probably a response to the harsh weather conditions of the winter and immense field work required in the summer. A significant jump in desertion in 1989 when the Soviets withdrew from Afghanistan may suggest a higher concern regarding returning home, rather than an overall opposition towards the war itself.

===== Inter-ethnic explanation for desertion =====
In the beginning of the Soviet invasion, the majority of Soviet forces were soldiers of Central Asian republics. The Soviets believed that shared ideologies between Muslim Central Asians and Afghan soldiers would build trust and morale within the army. However, Central Asians' longstanding historical frustrations with Moscow degraded soldiers' willingness to fight for the Red Army. As Afghan desertion grew and Soviet opposition was strengthened within Afghanistan, the Soviet plan overtly backfired.

The personal histories of Central Asian ethnic groups – especially between Pashtuns, Uzbeks, and Tajiks, caused tension within the Soviet military. Non-Russian ethnic groups easily related the situation in Afghanistan to Communist takeover of their own states' forced induction into the USSR. Ethnic Russians suspected Central Asians of opposition, and fighting within the army was prevalent.

Upon entering Afghanistan, many Central Asians were exposed to the Qur’an for the first time uninfluenced by Soviet propagandist versions, and felt a stronger connection towards the opposition than their own comrades. The highest rates of desertion were found among border troops, ranging from 60 to 80% during the first year of the Soviet invasion. In these areas, strong ethnic clashes and cultural factors influenced desertion.

As Afghan soldiers continued to desert the Soviet army, a united Islamic Alliance for the Liberation of Afghanistan began to form. Moderates and fundamentalists banded together to oppose Soviet intervention. The Islamic ideology solidified a strong base of opposition by January 1980, overriding ethnic, tribal, geographic and economic differences among Afghans willing to fight the Soviet invasion, which attracted Central Asian deserters. By March 1980, the Soviet army made an executive decision to replace Central Asian troops with the European sectors of the USSR to avoid further religious and ethnic complications, drastically reducing Soviet forces.

===== Soviet disillusionment upon entering the war =====
Soviet soldiers entered the war under the impression that their roles were primarily related to the organization of Afghan forces and society. Soviet media portrayed the Soviet intervention as a necessary means of protecting the Communist uprising from outside opposition. Propaganda declared that Soviets were providing aid to villagers and improving Afghanistan by planting trees, improving public buildings and "generally acting as good neighbors". Upon entering Afghanistan, Soviet soldiers became immediately aware of the falsity of the reported situation.

In major cities, Afghan youth that originally supported the leftist movement soon turned to Soviet oppositional forces for patriotic and religious reasons. The opposition built resistance in cities, calling Soviet soldiers infidels that were forcing an imperialist Communist invasive government on Afghanistan's people. As Afghan troops continued to abandon the Soviet army to support the mujahideen, they became anti-Russian and antigovernment. Opposition forces emphasized the Soviets' atheism, demanding support for the Muslim faith from civilians. The hostility shown towards soldiers, who entered the war believing their assistance was requested, grew defensive. The opposition circulated pamphlets within Soviet camps stationed in cities, calling for Afghan freedom from the aggressive Communist influence and a right to establish their own government.

The native Afghan army fell from 90,000 to 30,000 by mid-1980, forcing Soviets into more extreme combative positions. The mujahideen's widespread presence among Afghan civilians in rural regions made it difficult for Soviet soldiers to distinguish between the civilians they believed they were fighting for and the official opposition. Soldiers who had entered the war with idealistic viewpoints of their roles were quickly disillusioned.

===== Problems in Soviet army structure and living standards =====
The structure of the Soviet army, in comparison to the mujahideen, set the Soviets at a serious fighting disadvantage. While the mujahideen structure was based on kinship and social cohesion, the Soviet army was bureaucratic. Because of this, mujahideen could significantly weaken the Soviet army by the elimination of a field commander or officer. Resistance forces were locally based, more ready to address and mobilize the Afghan population for support. The Soviet army was centrally organized; its regime structure emphasized rank and position, paying less attention to the well-being and effectiveness of its army.

The initial Soviet plan relied on Afghan troops' support in the mountainous regions of Afghanistan. The majority of the Afghan army support crumbled easily as forces lacked strong ideological support for Communism from the beginning.

The Afghan army, comprising 100,000 men before 1978, was reduced to 15,000 within the first year of the Soviet invasion. Of the Afghan troops that remained, many were considered untrustworthy to Soviet troops. Afghans that deserted often took artillery with them, supplying the mujahideen. Soviet troops, to fill Afghan soldiers' place, were pushed into mountainous tribal regions of the East. Soviet tanks and modern warfare were ineffective in the rural, mountainous regions of Afghanistan. Mujahideen tactics of ambush prevented Soviets from developing successful counterattacks.

In 1980, the Soviet army began to rely on smaller and more cohesive units, a response to mirror mujahideen tactics. A decrease in unit size, while solving organizational issues, promoted field leaders to head more violent and aggressive missions, promoting Soviet desertion. Often, small forces would engage in rapes, looting, and general violence beyond what higher ranks ordered, increasing negative sanctions in undesirable locations.

Within the Soviet army, serious drug and alcohol problems significantly reduced the effectiveness of soldiers. Resources became further depleted as soldiers pushed into the mountains; drugs were rampantly abused and available, often supplied by Afghans. Supplies of heating fuel, wood, and food ran low at bases. Soviet soldiers often resorted to trading weapons and ammunition in exchange for drugs or food. As morale decreased and infections of hepatitis and typhus spread, soldiers became further disheartened.

===== Soviet deserters to the mujahideen =====
Interviews with Soviet soldier deserters confirm that much of Soviet desertion was in response to widespread Afghan opposition rather than personal aggravation towards the Soviet army. Armed with modern artillery against ill-equipped villagers, Soviet soldiers developed a sense of guilt for the widespread killing of innocent civilians and their unfair artillery advantage. Soviet deserters found support and acceptance within Afghan villages. After entering the mujahideen, many deserters came to recognize the falsity of Soviet propaganda from the beginning. Unable to legitimize the unnecessary killing and mistreatment of the Afghan people, many deserters could not face returning home and justifying their own actions and the unnecessary deaths of comrades. Upon deserting to the mujahideen, soldiers immersed themselves into Afghan culture. Hoping to rectify their position as the enemy, deserters learned the Afghan language and converted to Islam. Many Muslim Soviet soldiers also felt soldarity with the mujahadeen.

=== Ukraine ===
The criminal code of Ukraine states that "desertion in state of martial law or in a battle, shall be punishable by imprisonment for a term of 5 to 10 years". In early 2023, a new law was signed into the Ukrainian Parliament which stated that desertion or "failure to appear for duty without a valid reason" would result in up to 12 years in prison. Critics of the law argued that the law punishes soldiers more harshly rather than try to deal underlying causes of desertion. Per the Ukrainian Office of the Prosecutor General, more than 60,000 criminal cases have been opened for desertion with almost half occurring between January 2024 and September 2024. This number rose to 80,000 by October 2024 and 100,000 by the end of November 2024. In November 2024, it was estimated that the number of deserters residing in the country could be as high as 200,000. Tens of thousands have also attempted to flee the country with 21,113 being caught by August 2023. According to The Wall Street Journal, as of 10 September 2024, over 44,000 male Ukrainian deserters have successfully fled since the beginning of the war to Romania, Moldova, and Slovakia. This figure does not include those who fled to any other countries, or those who left Ukraine with papers obtained through bribery. For Ukrainian penal battalions, if a soldier of a penal battalion attempts to desert or retreat without authorisation, an additional 5 to 10 years would be added to their sentence.

=== United Kingdom ===
Historically, one who was paid to enlist and then deserted could be arrested under a type of writ known as arrestando ipsum qui pecuniam recepit, or "for arresting one who received money".

==== Napoleonic Wars ====
During the Napoleonic Wars desertion was a massive drain on British army resources, despite the threat of court martial and the possibility of capital punishment for the crime. Many deserters were harboured by citizens who were sympathetic to them.

==== First World War ====
"306 British and Commonwealth soldiers were executed for...desertion during World War I," records the Shot at Dawn Memorial. Of these, 25 were Canadian, 22 Irishmen and five New Zealanders.

"During the period between August 1914 and March 1920 more than 20,000 servicemen were convicted by courts-martial of offences which carried the death sentence. Only 3,000 of those men were ordered to be put to death and of those just over 10% were executed."

==== Second World War ====
Throughout the Second World War, almost 100,000 British and Commonwealth troops went Absent Without Official Leave (AWOL) or deserted from the armed forces. Capital punishment for desertion was abolished in 1930 so most were imprisoned.

==== Iraq War ====
On 28 May 2006, the UK military reported over 1,000 absent without leave since the beginning of the Iraq War, with 566 missing from 2005 and that part of 2006. The Ministry of Defence said that levels of absence were fairly constant and "only one person has been found guilty of deserting the Army since 1989".

=== United States ===
==== Legal definition ====
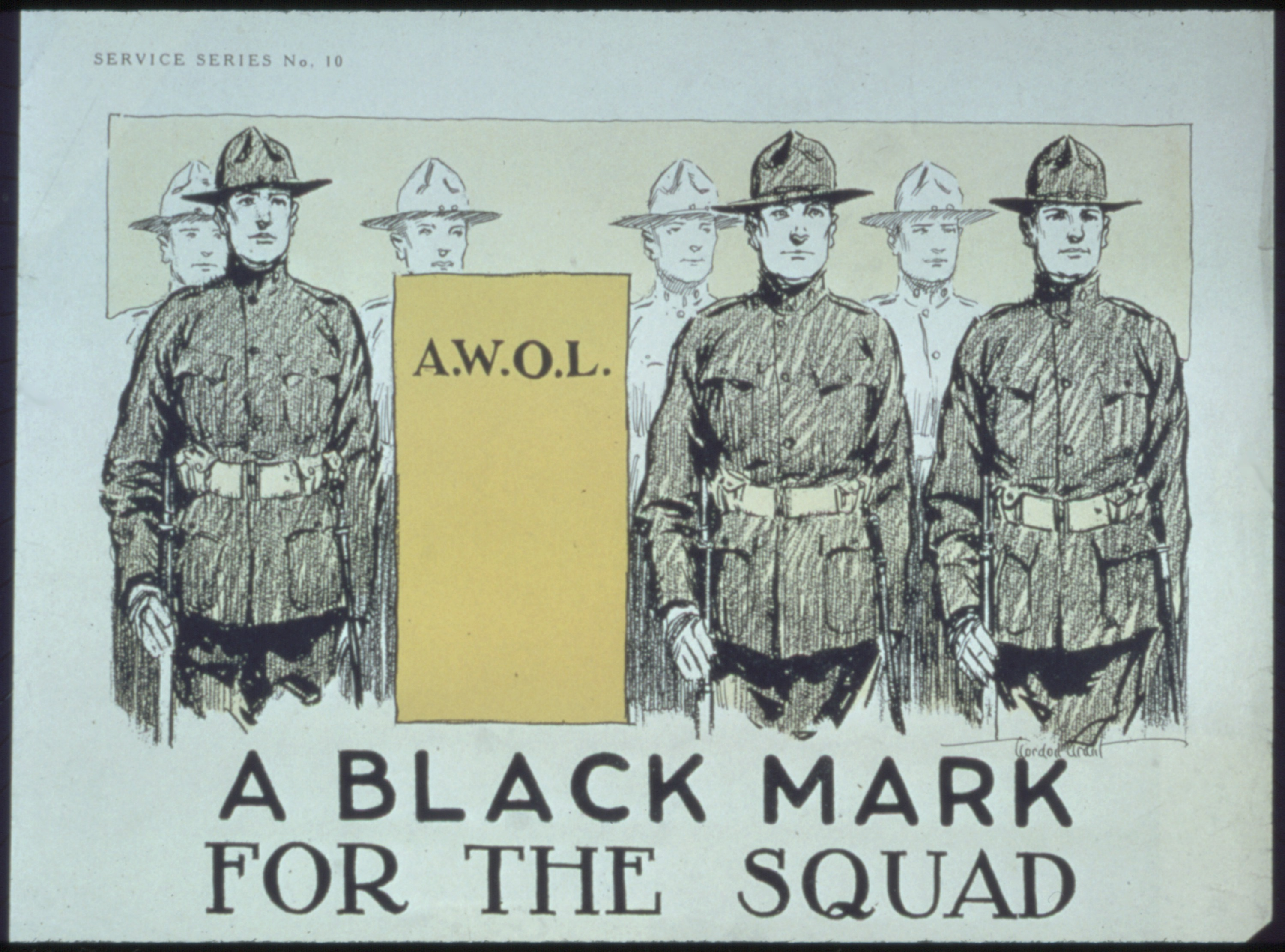
A United States wartime poster deprecating absence

According to the United States Uniform Code of Military Justice, desertion is defined as:

(a) Any member of the armed forces who–

(1) without authority goes or remains absent from his unit, organization, or place of duty with intent to remain away therefrom permanently;
(2) quits his unit, organization, or place of duty with intent to avoid hazardous duty or to shirk important service; or
(3) without being regularly separated from one of the armed forces enlists or accepts an appointment in the same or another one of the armed forces without fully disclosing the fact that he has not been regularly separated, or enters any foreign armed service except when authorized by the United States; is guilty of desertion.

(b) Any commissioned officer of the armed forces who, after tender of his resignation and before notice of its acceptance, quits his post or proper duties without leave and with intent to remain away therefrom permanently is guilty of desertion.

(c) Any person found guilty of desertion or attempt to desert shall be punished, if the offense is committed in time of war, by death or such other punishment as a court-martial may direct, but if the desertion or attempt to desert occurs at any other time, by such punishment, other than death, as a court-martial may direct.

==== War of 1812 ====
The desertion rate for American soldiers in the War of 1812 was 12.7%, according to available service records. Desertion was especially common in 1814, when enlistment bonuses were increased from $16 to $124, inducing many men to desert one unit and enlist in another to get two bonuses.

==== Mexican–American War ====
During the Mexican–American War, the desertion rate in the U.S. Army was 8.3% (9,200 out of 111,000), compared to 12.7% during the War of 1812 and usual peacetime rates of about 14.8% per year. Many men deserted in order to join another U.S. unit and get a second enlistment bonus. Others deserted because of the miserable conditions in camp, or in 1849–1850 were using the army to get free transportation to California, where they deserted to join the California Gold Rush. Several hundred deserters went over to the Mexican side; nearly all were recent immigrants from Europe with weak ties to the United States. The most famous group was the Saint Patrick's Battalion, about half of whom were Catholics from Ireland, anti-Catholic prejudice reportedly being another reason for desertion. The Mexicans issued broadsides and leaflets enticing U.S. soldiers with promises of money, land grants, and officers' commissions. Mexican guerrillas shadowed the U.S. Army, and captured men who took unauthorized leave or fell out of the ranks. The guerrillas coerced these men to join the Mexican ranks—threatening to kill them if they failed to comply. The generous promises proved illusory for most deserters, who risked execution if captured by U.S. forces. About fifty of the San Patricios were tried and hanged following their capture at Churubusco in August 1847.

High desertion rates were a major problem for the Mexican army, depleting forces on the eve of battle. Most of the soldiers were peasants who had a loyalty to their village and family but not to the generals who conscripted them. Often hungry and ill, never well paid, under-equipped and only partially trained, the soldiers were held in contempt by their officers and had little reason to fight the Americans. Looking for their opportunity, many slipped away from camp to find their way back to their home village.

==== American Civil War ====
During the American Civil War, both the Union and Confederacy had a desertion problem. From its 2.5 million or so men, the Union Army saw about 200,000 desertions. Over 100,000 deserted the Confederate army, which was less than a million men and possibly as little as a third the size of the Union Army.

New York suffered 44,913 desertions by the war's end, and Pennsylvania recorded 24,050, with Ohio reporting desertions at 18,354. About 1 out of 3 deserters returned to their regiments, either voluntarily or after being arrested and being sent back. Many of the desertions were by "professional" bounty men, men who would enlist to collect the often large cash bonuses and then desert at the earliest opportunity to repeat another enlistment elsewhere. If caught they would face execution; otherwise it could prove a very lucrative criminal enterprise.

The total number of Confederate deserters was officially 103,400. Desertion was a major factor for the Confederacy in the last two years of the war. According to Mark A. Weitz, Confederate soldiers fought to defend their families, not a nation. He argues that a hegemonic "planter class" brought Georgia into the war with "little support from non-slaveholders" (p. 12), and the ambivalence of non-slaveholders toward secession, he maintains, was the key to understanding desertion. The privations of the home front and camp life, combined with the terror of battle, undermined the weak attachment of southern soldiers to the Confederacy. For Georgian troops, Sherman's march through their home counties triggered the most desertions.

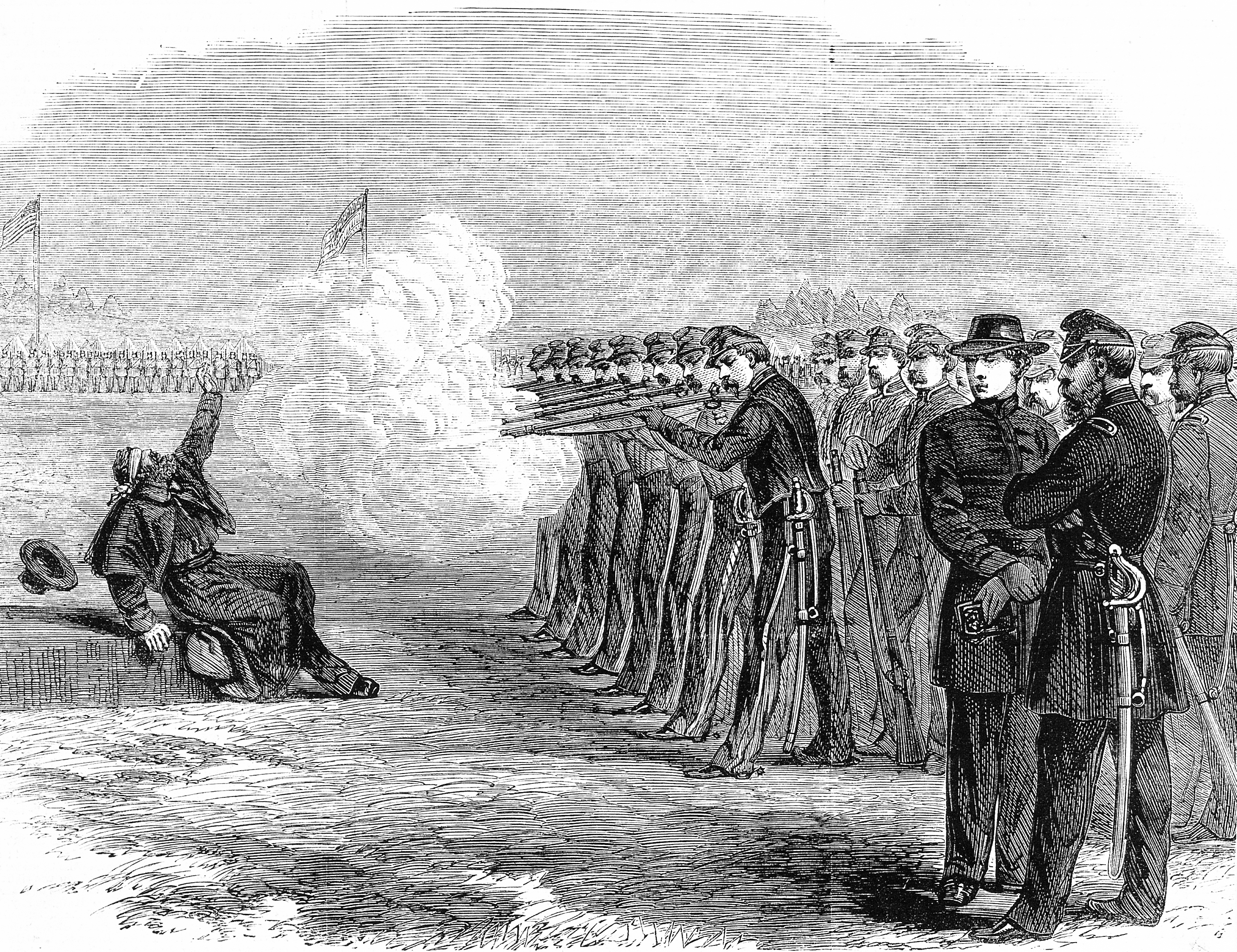
The execution of a U.S. deserter in the Federal Camp, Alexandria

Adoption of a localist identity caused soldiers to desert as well. When soldiers implemented a local identity, they neglected to think of themselves as Southerners fighting a Southern cause. When they replaced their Southern identity with their previous local identity, they lost their motive to fight and, therefore, deserted the army.

A growing threat to the solidarity of the Confederacy was dissatisfaction in the Appalachian mountain districts caused by lingering unionism and a distrust of the slave power. Many of their soldiers deserted, returned home, and formed a military force that fought off regular army units trying to punish them. North Carolina lost 23% of its soldiers (24,122) to desertion. The state provided more soldiers per capita than any other Confederate state, and had more deserters as well.

==== Philippine–American War ====
During the Philippine–American War, the counter insurgency campaign conducted by the American military involved considerable brutality on both sides, including summary executions of both combatants and civilians. In the course of the conflict, 17 American soldiers were sentenced to death for desertion. However, only two sentences, applied to African-American soldiers (Edmund DuBose and Lewis Russell) of the 9th Cavalry Regiment, who had been convicted of far more serious charges of desertion to the enemy, in 1902, were carried out; an action which critics have asserted amounted to a selective and unfair application of the death penalty. These were the last American soldiers to be executed for desertion until the execution of Private Eddie Slovik during the Second World War.

==== First World War ====
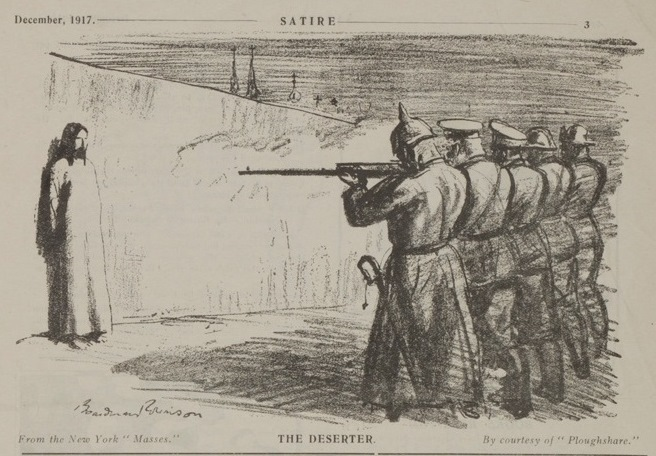
The Deserter (1916) by Boardman Robinson. Anti-war cartoon depicting Jesus facing a firing squad made up of soldiers from five different European countries.

Desertion still occurred among American armed forces after the U.S. joined the First World War on 6 April 1917. Between 6 April 1917, and 31 December 1918, the American Expeditionary Forces (AEF) charged 5,584 servicemen and convicted 2,657 for desertion. 24 AEF troops were eventually sentenced to death, albeit all of them avoided execution after President Woodrow Wilson commuted their death sentences to prison terms. Deserters were often publicly humiliated. One U.S. Navy deserter, Henry Holscher, later joined a UK regiment and won the Military Medal.

==== Second World War ====
Over 20,000 American soldiers were tried and sentenced for desertion. Forty-nine were sentenced to death, though forty-eight of these death sentences were subsequently commuted. Only one U.S. soldier, Private Eddie Slovik, was executed for desertion in World War II.

==== Vietnam War ====
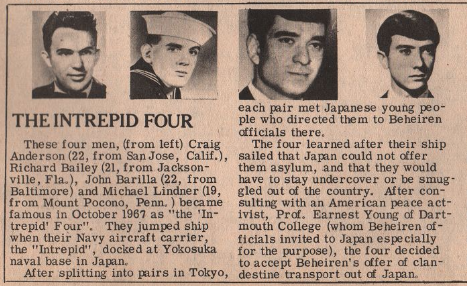
The Intrepid Four, four U.S. Navy seamen who deserted from the USS Intrepid in protest against the war in Vietnam

According to the Department of Defense, 503,926 United States servicemen deserted during the Vietnam War between 1 July 1966 to 31 December 1973. Some of these migrated to Canada. Among those who deserted to Canada were Andy Barrie, host of Canadian Broadcasting Corporation Radio's Metro Morning, and Jack Todd, sports columnist for the Montreal Gazette. Other countries also gave asylum to deserted U.S. soldiers. For example, Sweden allows asylum for foreign soldiers deserting from war, if the war does not align with the current goals of Swedish foreign policy.

==== Iraq War ====
According to the Pentagon, more than 5,500 military personnel deserted in 2003–2004, following the Iraq invasion and occupation. The number had reached about 8,000 by the first quarter of 2006. Almost all of these soldiers deserted within the United States. There has been only one reported case of a desertion in Iraq. The Army, Navy, and Air Force reported 7,978 desertions in 2001, compared with 3,456 in 2005. The Marine Corps showed 1,603 Marines in desertion status in 2001. That had declined to 148 by 2005.

==== Penalties ====
Before the Civil War, deserters from the Army were flogged; after 1861, tattoos or branding were also used. The maximum U.S. penalty for desertion in wartime remains death, but this punishment was last applied to Eddie Slovik in 1945. No U.S. service member has received more than 24 months imprisonment for desertion or missing movement after September 11, 2001.

A U.S. service member who is AWOL/UA may be punished with non-judicial punishment (NJP) or by court martial under Article 86 of the UCMJ for repeat or more severe offenses. Many AWOL/UA service members are also given a discharge in lieu of court-martial.

The 2012 edition of the United States Manual for Courts-Martial states that:

Any person found guilty of desertion or attempt to desert shall be punished, if the offense is committed in time of war, by death or such other punishment as a court-martial may direct, but if the desertion or attempt to desert occurs at any other time, by such punishment, other than death, as a court-martial may direct.

== Legal status of desertion in cases of war crime ==
Under international law, ultimate "duty" or "responsibility" is not necessarily always to a "government" nor to "a superior", as seen in the fourth of the Nuremberg Principles, which states:

The fact that a person acted pursuant to order of his Government or of a superior does not relieve him from responsibility under international law, provided a moral choice was in fact possible to him.

Although a soldier under direct orders, in battle, is normally not subject to prosecution for war crimes, there is legal language supporting a soldier's refusal to commit such crimes, in military contexts outside of immediate peril.

In 1998, UNCHR resolution 1998/77 (Note: "Conscientious objection to military service: United Nations Commission on Human Rights resolution 1998/77" (1998), United Nations Office of the High Commissioner for Human Rights) recognized that "persons [already] performing military service may develop conscientious objections" while performing military service. This opens the possibility of desertion as a response to cases in which the soldier is required to perform crimes against humanity as part of mandatory military duty.

The principle was tested unsuccessfully in the case of U.S. Army deserter Jeremy Hinzman, which resulted in a Canadian federal immigration board rejecting refugee status to a deserter invoking Nuremberg Article IV.

== See also ==
- Barratry (admiralty law)
- Canada and Iraq War resisters
- Conscientious objector
- Decimation (Roman army)
- Defection
- Draft evasion
- Green Cadres
- List of Iraq War resisters
- Mutiny
- No call, no show, in civilian employment
- Nuremberg Principle IV
- Resistance Inside the Army
- Running the gauntlet
- War resister

== Works cited ==
- Manual for Courts-Martial United States (PDF) (2012 ed.). US Government Printing Office.
- Bearman, Peter S. (1991). "Desertion as Localism: Army Unit Solidarity and Group Norms in the U.S. Civil War". Social Forces. 70 (2): 321–342. doi:10.2307/2580242. JSTOR 2580242.
- Foos, Paul (2002). A Short, Offhand, Killing Affair: Soldiers and Social Conflict during the Mexican-American War. Chapel Hill, North Carolina: The University of North Carolina Press. ISBN 978-0807827314.
- Lambley, Desmond Bruce (2012). March in the Guilty Bastard. Burleigh, Qld: Zeus Publications. ISBN 978-1-921-91953-4. – includes an alphabetical listing of more than 17,000 Australian soldiers who were court-martialled by the AIF during World War I.
- Lonn, Ella (1998) [1928, Gloucester, MA: American Historical Association]. Desertion during the Civil War. University of Nebraska Press. ISBN 9780803279759. OCLC 38081430.
- Marrs, Aaron W. (2004). "Desertion and Loyalty in the South Carolina Infantry, 1861–1865". Civil War History. 50: 47–65. doi:10.1353/cwh.2004.0019.
- Nussio, Enzo; Ugarriza, Juan E. (2021). "Why Rebels Stop Fighting: Organizational Decline and Desertion in Colombia's Insurgency". International Security. 45 (4): 167–203. doi:10.1162/isec_a_00406. hdl:20.500.11850/480000. ISSN 0162-2889.
- Weitz, Mark A. (2000). A Higher Duty: Desertion among Georgia Troops during the Civil War. University of Nebraska Press. ISBN 9780803247918. OCLC 62344291.
- Weitz, Mark A. (1999). "Preparing for the Prodigal Sons: The Development of the Union Desertion Policy during the Civil War". Civil War History. 45 (2): 99–125. doi:10.1353/cwh.1999.0082.
