= Ballhausplatz =

Square in Vienna, Austria

Coordinates: 48.208°N 16.364°E

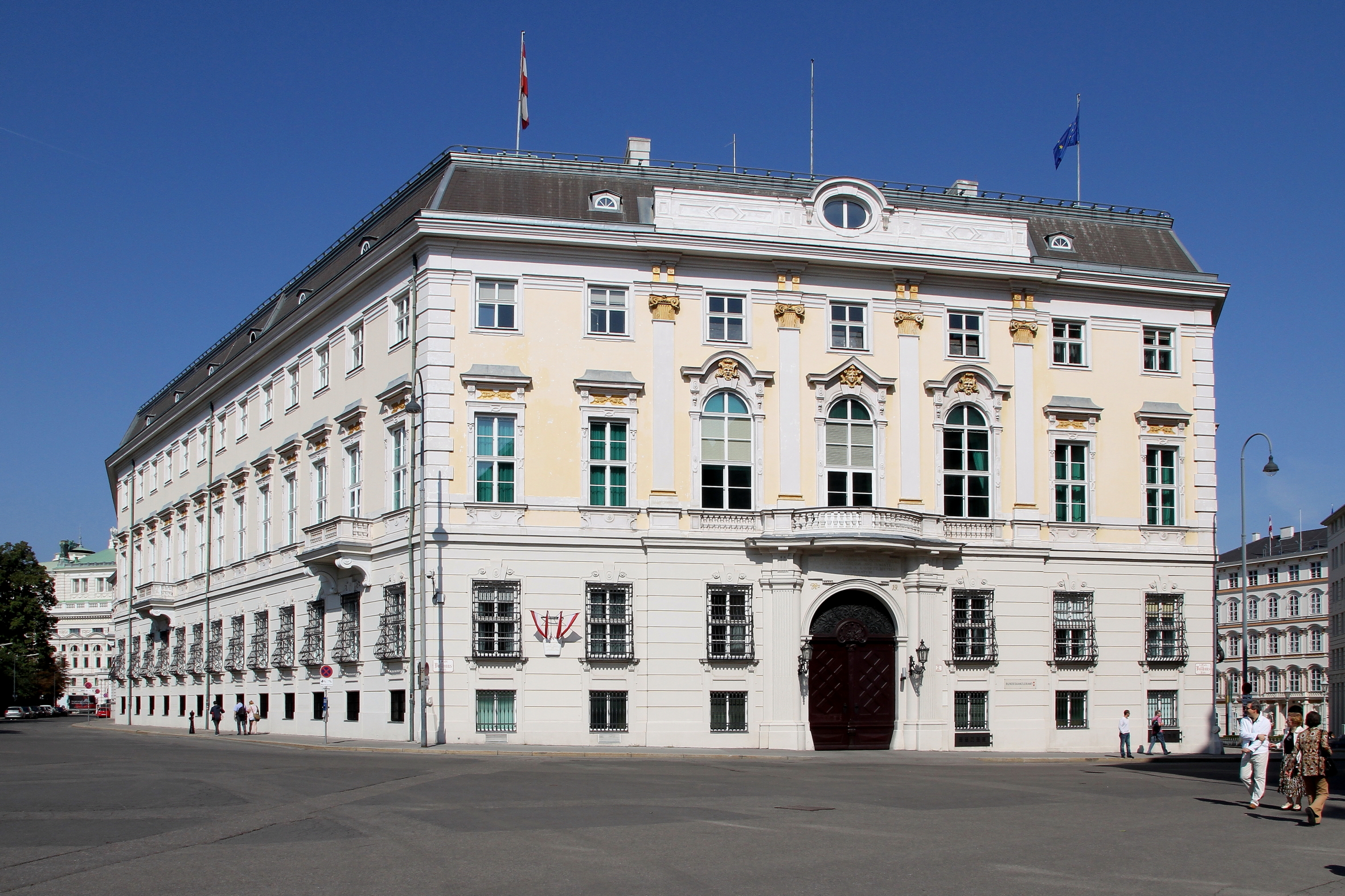
Austrian Federal Chancellery at Ballhausplatz

Ballhausplatz is a square in central Vienna containing the building (with the address Ballhausplatz 2) that for over two hundred years has been the official residence of the most senior Austrian Cabinet Minister, the State Chancellor, today the Chancellor of Austria (Prime Minister). As a result, Ballhausplatz is often used as shorthand for the Austrian Federal Chancellery. Until 1918 the Foreign Ministry of Austria-Hungary was also housed here. Similar to Downing Street or the Hotel Matignon, the word Ballhausplatz (or Ballplatz for short) is a synecdoche for the seat of power.

Ballhausplatz is located in the first district Innere Stadt in central Vienna, a few minutes' walk from the Austrian Parliament Building and on the edge of the grounds of Hofburg Imperial Palace. Until 1754 the square itself did not exist, as an imperial hospital was located there. Ferdinand I, Holy Roman Emperor, erected a real tennis house there, the Ballhaus (ball house). Later the building was used for the Imperial Court Construction Office (Hofbauamt). At the end of the 18th century, the Ballhaus was ripped down.

== History of occupancy ==
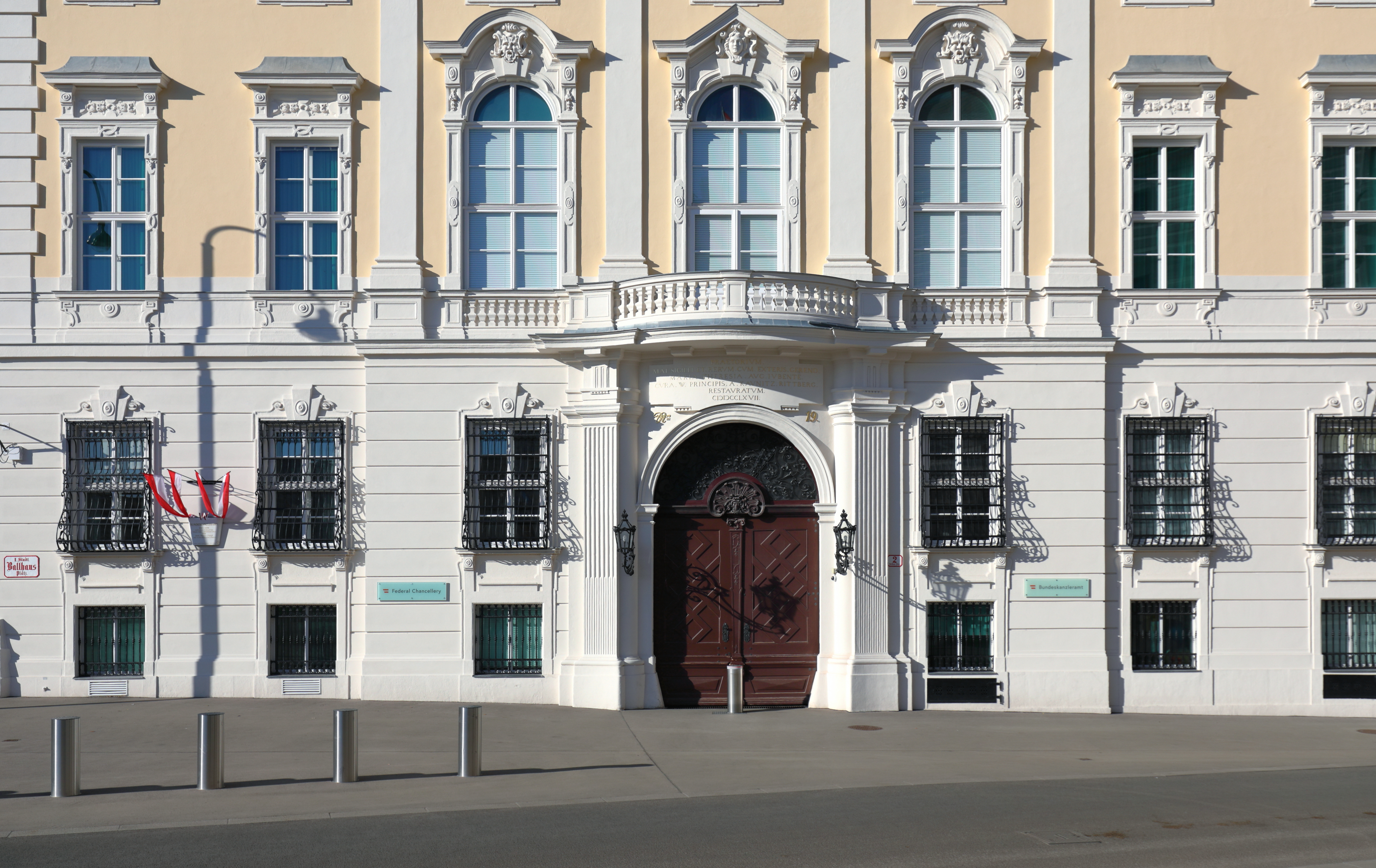
Portal of the Federal Chancellery at Ballhausplatz 2

Ballhausplatz 2 is the official residence of the Federal Chancellor. It was constructed in 1717/19 by the architect Johann Lukas von Hildebrandt and expanded in 1766 by Nicolò Pacassi under the guidance of Chancellor Wenzel Anton Graf Kaunitz. Originally called the Geheime Hofkanzlei (Secret Court Chancellery), it was expanded in 1881 and again in 1902, when the Haus-, Hof-, und Staatsarchiv (today the Austrian State Archive) were added on the site of the former Minoritenkloster monastery, next to the Minoritenkirche. The main facade has largely remained the same since its construction by von Hildebrandt. The interior is richly decorated with stucco. The building suffered heavy damage during World War II due to aerial bombardments, but was repaired. Located on the first floor are the offices of the Federal Chancellor, federal ministers, and conference rooms. The Government of Austria regularly meets here for cabinet meetings.

Ballhausplatz 2 played an important role in European politics for over 250 years. It was here that Chancellor Klemens Wenzel von Metternich held the Congress of Vienna, which was held after Napoleon Bonaparte's defeat in 1814 and resulted in the "balance of power". Chancellor Engelbert Dollfuß was murdered by Nazis in his office in 1934. His successor Kurt von Schuschnigg gave his farewell speech shortly before Austria was annexed by Nazi-Germany in 1938 with his famous closing words "Gott schütze Österreich" ("God save Austria"). After 1945 and the restoration of independence the offices of the Federal Chancellor were once again located here.

During the Schüssel coalition between the conservative ÖVP and the far-right FPÖ in the years 2000 to 2007, regular demonstrations against this government have been held in front of the Chancellor's office.

Ballhausplatz 1 is the address of the Office of the President of Austria (Österreichische Präsidentschaftskanzlei). The offices of the president himself are located in the Hofburg Imperial Palace.

== Memorial for the Victims of Nazi Military Justice ==
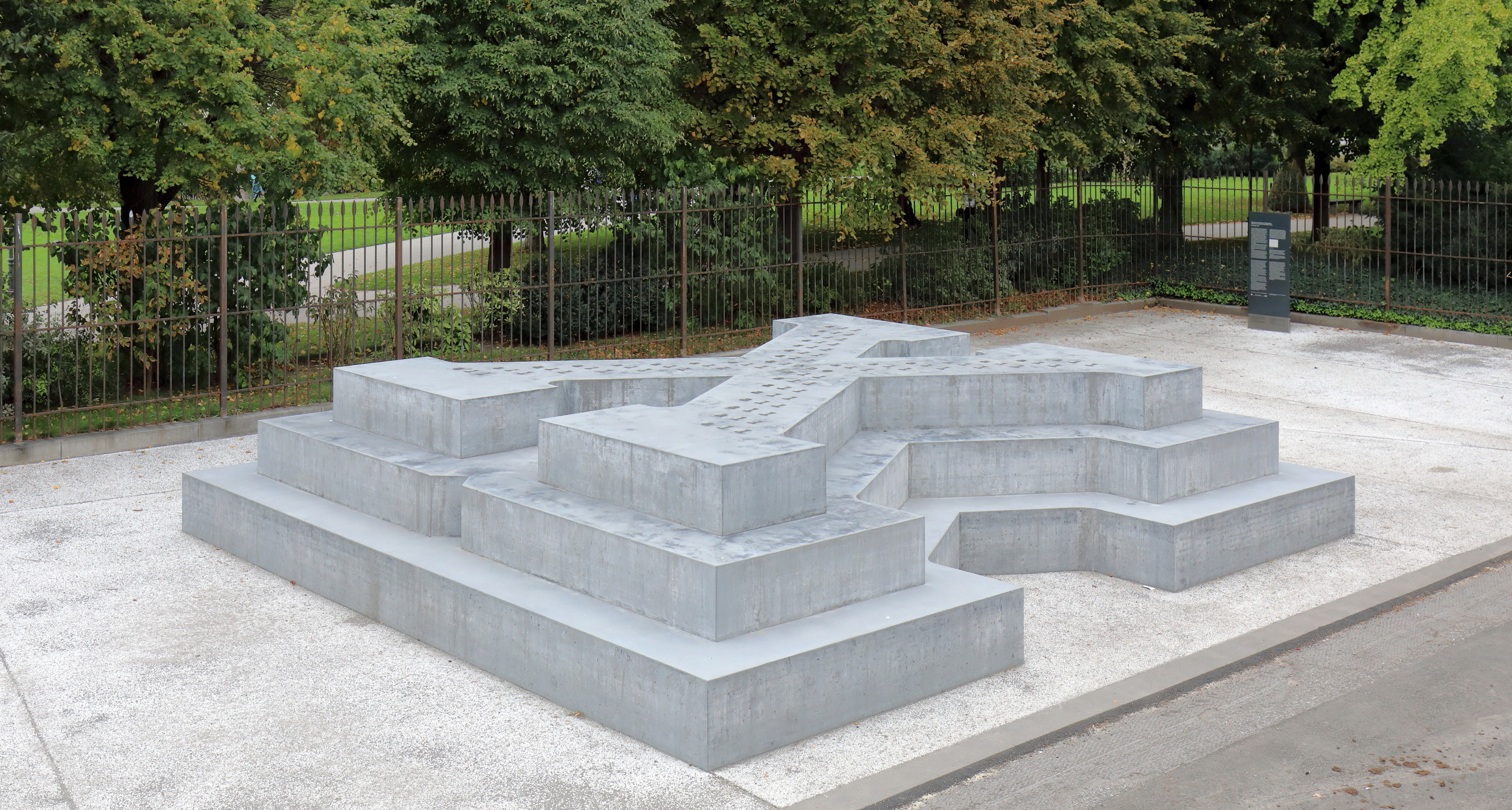
Memorial for the Victims of Nazi Military Justice

In 2011, Vienna decided to honour Austrian Wehrmacht deserters. On 24 October 2014, a Memorial for the Victims of Nazi Military Justice was inaugurated on the Ballhausplatz by Austria's President Heinz Fischer. The monument was created by German artist Olaf Nicolai and is located opposite the President's office and the Austrian Chancellery. The inscription on top of the three-step sculpture features a poem by Scottish poet, Ian Hamilton Finlay (1924-2006), made up of just two words: all alone.

== See also ==
- Minoritenplatz

== Books ==
- Czeike, Felix (1973). Wien: Kunst & Kultur. Sueddeutscher Verlag, Munich. ISBN 3-7991-5769-7
