= Olaf Nicolai =

German conceptual artist

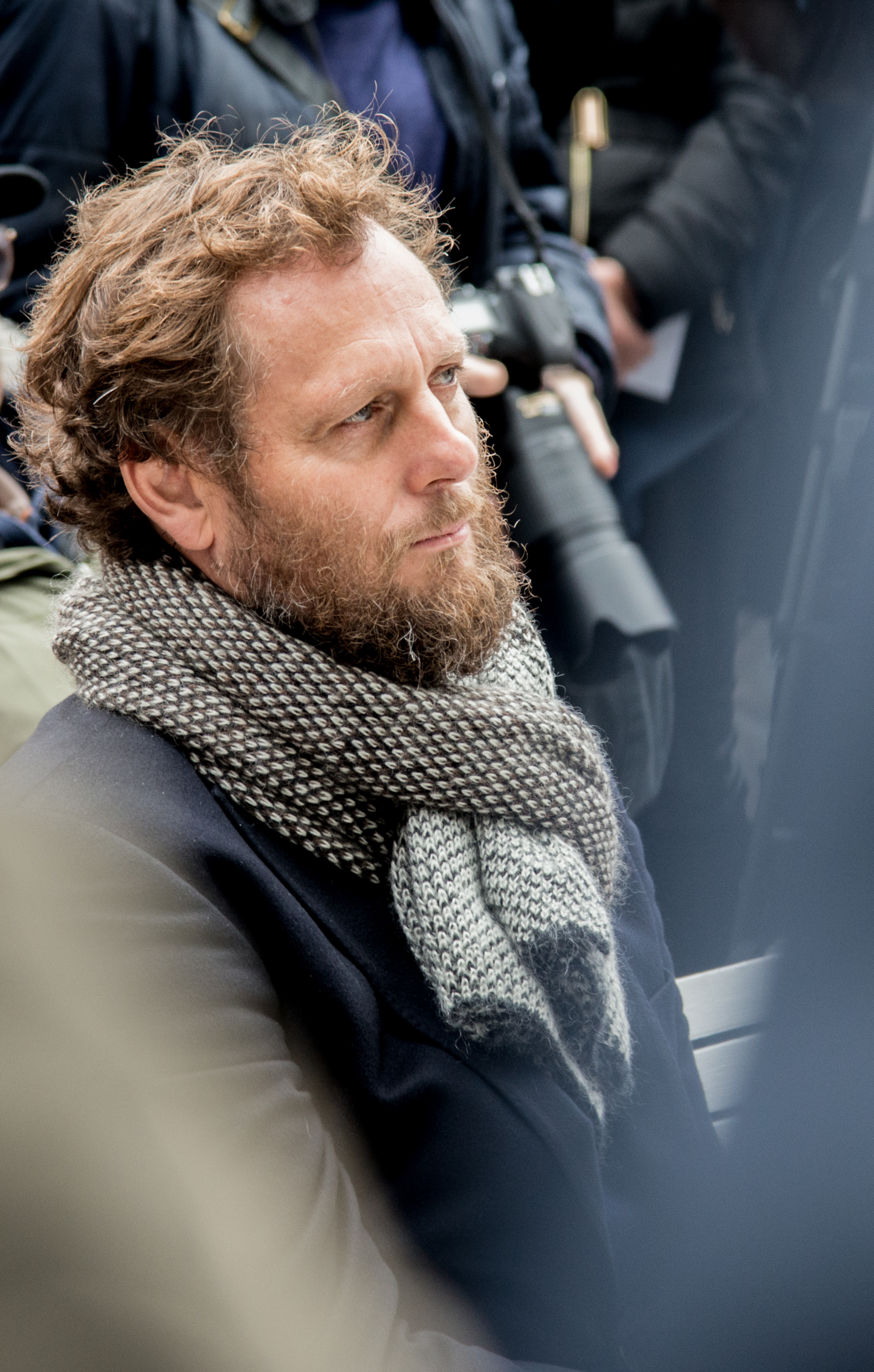
Olaf Nicolai, 2014

Olaf Nicolai (born 1962 in Halle an der Saale) is a German conceptual artist.

== Life ==
Olaf Nicolai grew up in Chemnitz (formerly Karl-Marx-Stadt) in the German Democratic Republic. From 1983 to 1988 he studied German language and literature at the universities of Leipzig, Vienna and Budapest, in 1992 obtaining a doctorate from Leipzig University. His thesis concerned the Poetics of the Wiener Gruppe, exploring the means of expression used and their strategic implementation. There exists a close relation between this group's work and his own artistic endeavours. Nicolai also holds a diploma in applied arts from the Technical College at Schneeberg in Saxony.

His works were shown at documenta in 1997 and at the Venice Biennale in 2001, 2005 and 2015. He has been awarded various grants and fellowships, for example from Villa Massimo, Rome (1998) and from Villa Aurora, Los Angeles (2007). Since the early 1990s, Nicolai has participated in numerous international solo and group exhibitions at important crossroads of contemporary arts. Several of his works can be found in public collections, such as the Museum of Modern Art, New York and at the Friedrich Christian Flick Collection, Berlin.

Olaf Nicolai lives and works in Berlin's Prenzlauer Berg district.

== Work ==
Nicolai's conceptual approach and continuous use of diverse media and materials both question the way in which we view our everyday environment. He is constantly translating scientific theories into art, into aesthetic-artistic idioms, rendering them accessible through new contexts; he refers to American sociologist, Jeremy Rifkin, who wrote:

The production of art is the final step of capitalism, whose driving force has always been to coopt ever more human activities into economic processes.

— Jeremy Rifkin, Le Monde diplomatique, N. 7131, August 15, 2003

Considered one of Germany's leading artists, Olaf Nicolai takes on a range of conceptual themes, from political and cultural critiques to inquiries into human perception. A recurring subject is the aesthetic appropriation of nature by human culture and design, explored through mixed-media sculptures and images, as in his juxtaposition of plant forms with depictions of hand gestures in Italian Renaissance paintings. “Questions of form, moods, attitudes, and style are not just vain play with surfaces,” Nicolai has said. “They are questions of organizational forms of activities.”

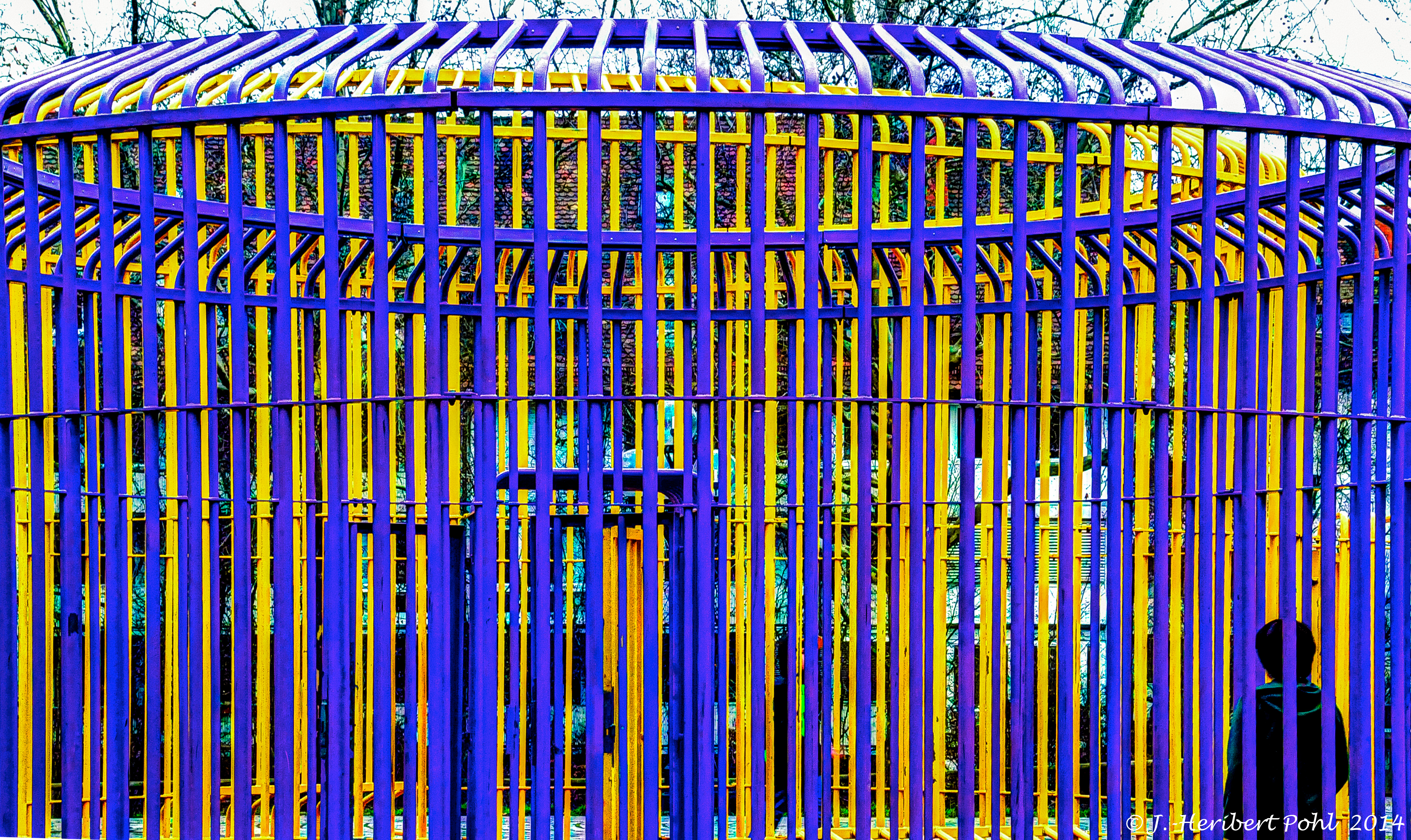
Pavillons at Insel Schütt, Nürnberg, 2006

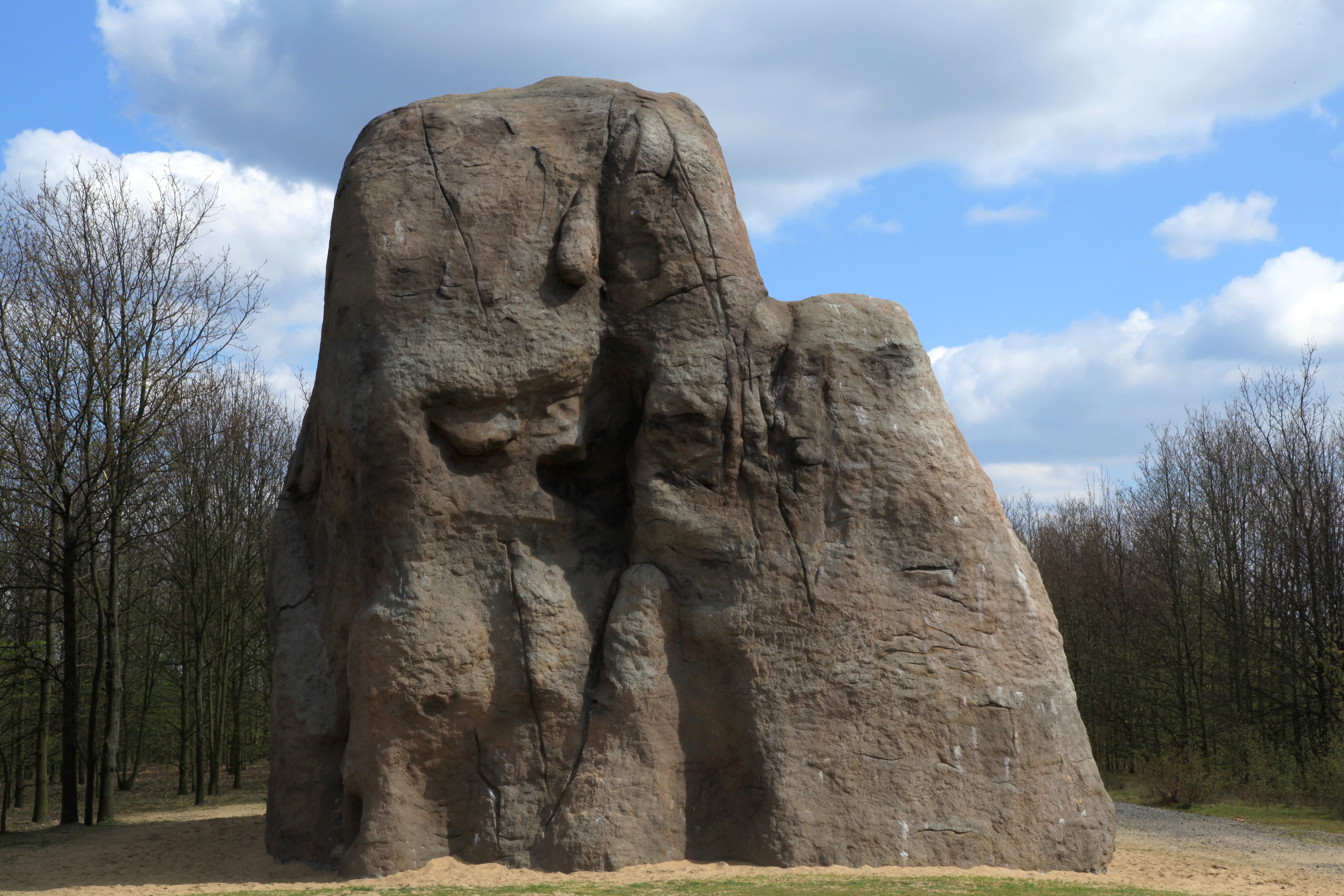
Monument for a Forgotten Future, Gelsenkirchen 2010

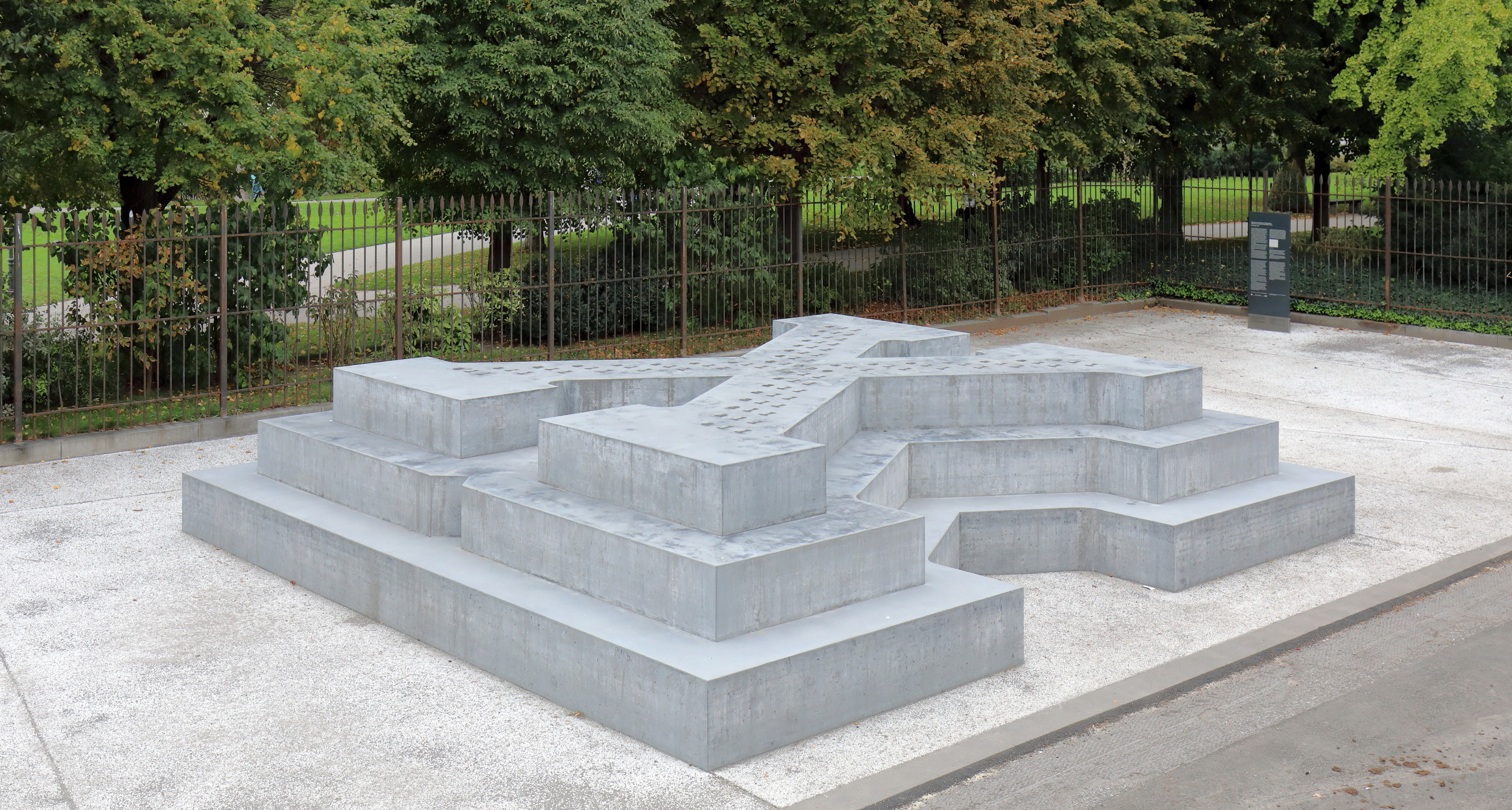
Memorial for the Victims of Nazi Military Justice, 2014

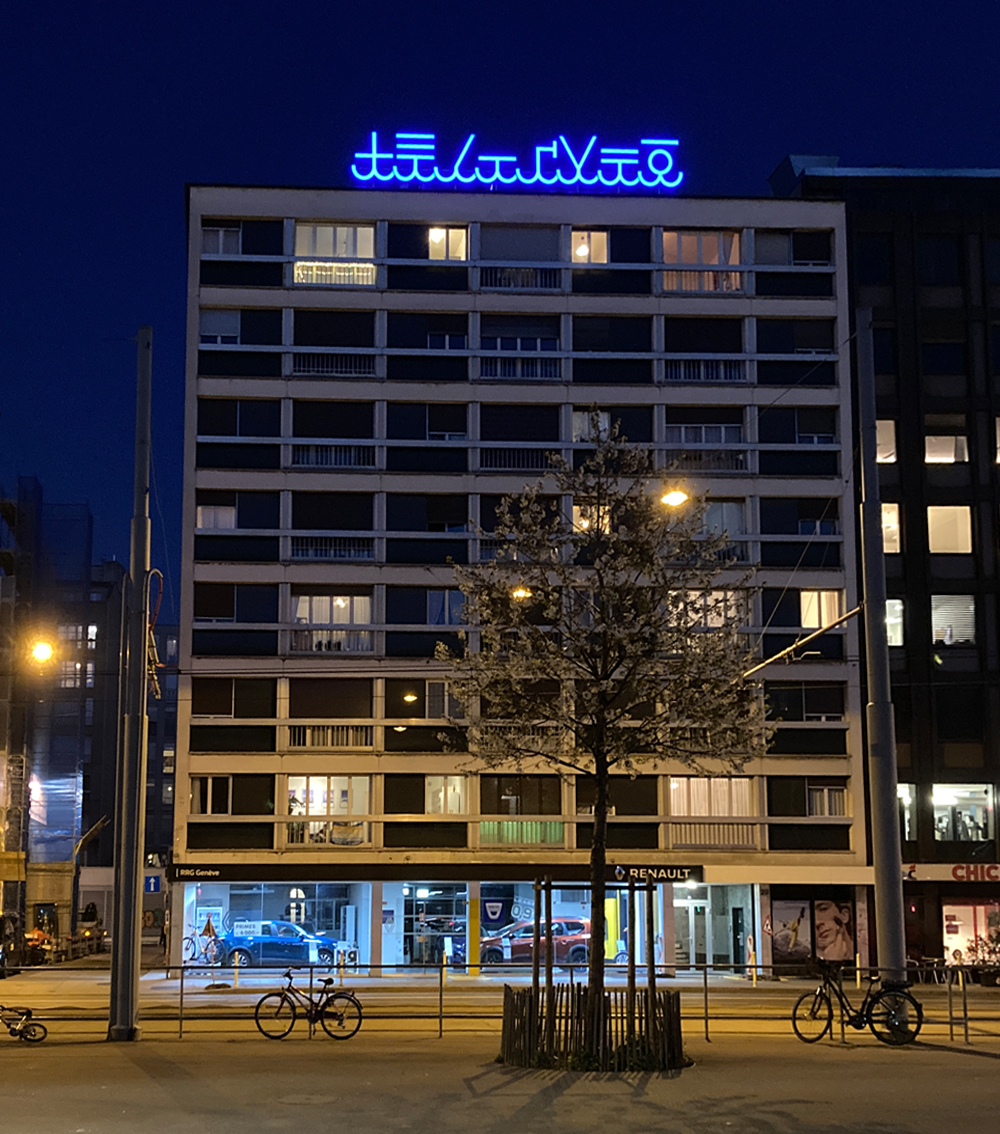
Olaf Nicolai, ALDEZBF? 2022, Neon Parallax Geneva

In several of his works the artist confronts "socialist ideals" with its direct adversary, the "capitalistic market economy" and thus formulates the ambivalence and contradiction between aspects of utopia, pragmatism, consumerism and aesthetics. In his artwork Lenin: 8 qm the animadversion toward a redistribution of income and wealth stands in net contrast to the sequins of a brilliant and luxurious form of capitalism. Die Flamme der Revolution, liegend (in Wolfsburg, 2002) [The flame of revolution] is one of the very concrete examples of political constructivism.

Since 2009 the Kunstmuseum Thurgau exhibits the artist's project Welcome to the Tears of St. Lawrence at the Kartause Ittingen. The work, originally created for the 51. Biennale di Venezia in 2005, belongs to the Collection Thyssen-Bornemisza Art Contemporary and contains the request of the artist to watch the skies and to search for silence. At its current venue this work of art is perfectly located as the Order of Saint Bruno requests silence and contemplation as prerequisite to a spiritual life.

In 2010, the Hannover Kestnergesellschaft invited the artist to exhibit his works. Nicolai chose the French title Faites le travail qu'accomplit le soleil [Do the work accomplished by the sun]; his show and its title referred to both the institution and to El Lissitzky whose works were shown at the same place in 1923. The main sculpture of the exhibit was a tower of glass and mirrors accessible by the public, right unter the glass cupola of the Kestnergesellschaft.

In a series of art performances called Escalier du Chant [Staircase of Song] (2011), Nicolai took over the sweeping staircase of Munich's modern art museum, Pinakothek der Moderne, for one Sunday of each month in 2011. Throughout the day, performers would sing the songs of twelve contemporary composers which addressed political issues that took place throughout that year, creating a new aesthetic context for the year's political events. In 2012, at Städel in Frankfurt am Main, he presented his sculpture Shutter's Lullaby, two concentric cages in form of an ellipsis.

On October 24, 2014 Austria's president Heinz Fischer officially spoke at the opening of Nicolai's Memorial for the Victims of Nazi Military Justice at Viennas Ballhausplatz. Two years earlier, the artist had won the first prize at the Memorial Competition implemented by the City Council of Vienna. Nicolai's monument consists of a concrete sculpture in three steps and in the form of a X. The inscription on top of the monument consists of a concrete poem by Scottish point Ian Hamilton Finlay with just two words: all (repeated several times) and alone (reproduced just once, in the center of the X).

== Other activities ==
In 2023, Nicolai was part of the selection committee that nominated Zasha Colah as artistic director of the Berlin Biennale in 2025.

== Literature, catalogues ==
- Petra Gördüren, Dirk Luckow (ed.): Dopplereffekt. Bilder in Kunst und Wissenschaft, Kunsthalle Kiel, January 31 to May 2, 2010. Kiel: DuMont 2010, ISBN 978-3-8321-9295-2
- Olaf Nicolai: „Show Case“; Institut für moderne Kunst Nürnberg, ISBN 3933096219
- Olaf Nicolai: „The Blondes“; Artimo, Amsterdam, 2005
- Olaf Nicolai: „Rewind – Forward“; Hatje Cantz 2003.
- Olaf Nicolai: „Enjoy / Survive“; die gestalten verlag, 2001
- Olaf Nicolai: „30 Farben“; Salon Verlag 2000
- Olaf Nicolai: „Stilleben“; Berlin 1999 / 2000
- Olaf Nicolai: „bubblegram - a street surfing“; Kunsthaus Bregenz 1999
- Wolfgang Träger u.a.: Plateau der Menschheit. 49. Biennale von Venedig. In: kunstforum international, Vol. 156, 2001; 135

== Public Collections ==
- Museum of Modern Art, New York
- Friedrich Christian Flick Collection, Hamburger Bahnhof Berlin
- Thyssen-Bornemisza Art Contemporary, Vienna
- Migros Museum für Gegenwartskunst, Zurich
- Städtische Galerie, Wolfsburg
- Brandenburgische Kunstsammlungen, Cottbus
- CAAC, Sevilla
- Denver Art Museum, Denver
- FMAC and FCAC Collection, Geneva

== Accolades ==
- 1996 Botho-Graef-Preis
- 1999 Bremer Kunstpreis
- 2002 Kunstpreis Junge Stadt sieht junge Kunst awarded by the city of Wolfsburg
