= Memorial for the Victims of Nazi Military Justice =

Coordinates: 48.2080°N 16.3634°E

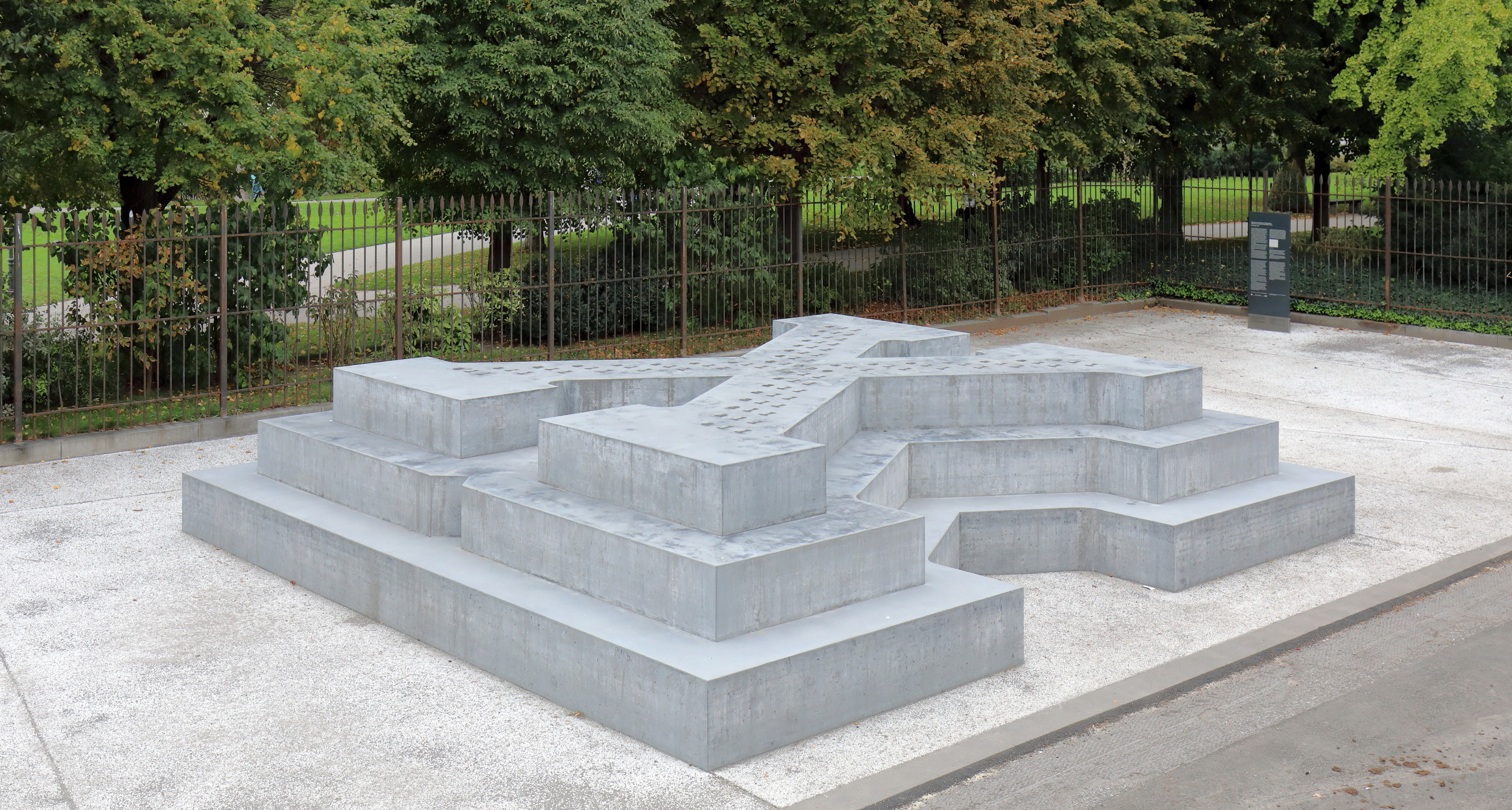
Memorial for the Victims of Nazi Military Justice at Vienna's Ballhausplatz

The Memorial for the Victims of Nazi Military Justice is located at the Ballhausplatz in the centre of Vienna, opposite the President's office and the Austrian Chancellory. The monument was created by German conceptual artist Olaf Nicolai. The inscription atop the three-step sculpture features the poem by Scottish poet Ian Hamilton Finlay consisting of just two words: all alone.

== Desertion, Wehrkraftzersetzung, Conscientious Objection ==
Of the Germans and Austrians who deserted the Wehrmacht, 15,000 men were executed. In contrast only 18 Germans who deserted in the first world war were executed. Approximately 10 percent of all victims of Nazi Military Justice were Austrians.

In June 1988 the Initiative for the Creation of a Memorial to Deserters came to life in Ulm and Neu Ulm. A central idea was, "Desertion is not reprehensible, war is".

== Genesis ==
In 1990, a group led by Friedrun Huemer, the then Green District Councillor in Leopoldstadt, carried out a campaign for the deserters of the Wehrmacht in Vienna. The former deserter Richard Wadani played a major role in enforcing the legal recognition of the deserters and in the decision for a monument. In 2002, he founded the Persons committee "Justice for the Victims of National Socialist Military Justice", which was constituted as an association in 2008. Wadani achieved his breakthrough in 2009 when the then President of the National Council, Barbara Prammer, took up the matter and in October of the same year a draft law was presented by the SPÖ, the ÖVP and the Greens. On 21 October 2009, the Austrian Social Democratic Party (SPÖ) and the ÖVP (Austrian Peoples Party) were represented. On 21 October 2009, the Austrian National Council decided with the votes of the SPÖ, the ÖVP and the Greens to rehabilitate all victims of persecution by the Wehrmacht courts. In 2010, the new red-green coalition in Vienna agreed in its intergovernmental agreement to erect a memorial in memory of the deserters.

The annulment of the judgments against deserters took place in Austria later than in the Federal Republic of Germany, where the annulment of the injustice judgments took place with the first amending law to the law for the annulment of National Socialist injustice judgments in the criminal justice system on 23 July 2002.

Immediately after the adoption of the Rehabilitation Act in 2009, the Persons Committee Justice for the Victims of National Socialist Military Justice began lobbying for a monument at a central location in Vienna. For this purpose, the Persons Committee was able to win over a number of well-known personalities from politics, art and culture, as well as Austrian civil society.

=== Competition ===
The costs for the monument were budgeted at 200,000 euros, which were fully covered by the Cultural Office of the City of Vienna. The organisation of the tender and realisation of the monument was entrusted to the institution "Kunst im öffentlichen Raum Wien". The competition was conducted as a one-stage, invited procedure. The chairman of the jury was the architect Martin Kohlbauer, the jury included the artist Anna Jermolaeva, the curator Lilli Hollein, the art historian Dirk Luckow, the historian Peter Pirker and the historian Heidemarie Uhl. In addition to the winner Nicolai, seven other projects took part: the German-Uruguayan artist Luis Camnitzer, the French collective Claire Fontaine, the Slovak-Canadian Documenta participant Vera Frenkel, as well as from Austria the duo Helmut and Johanna Kandl, Ernst Logar, the winners of the Cardinal-König-Kunstpreis 2007, Nicole Six/Paul Petritsch, and Heimo Zobernig.

== Sculpture ==
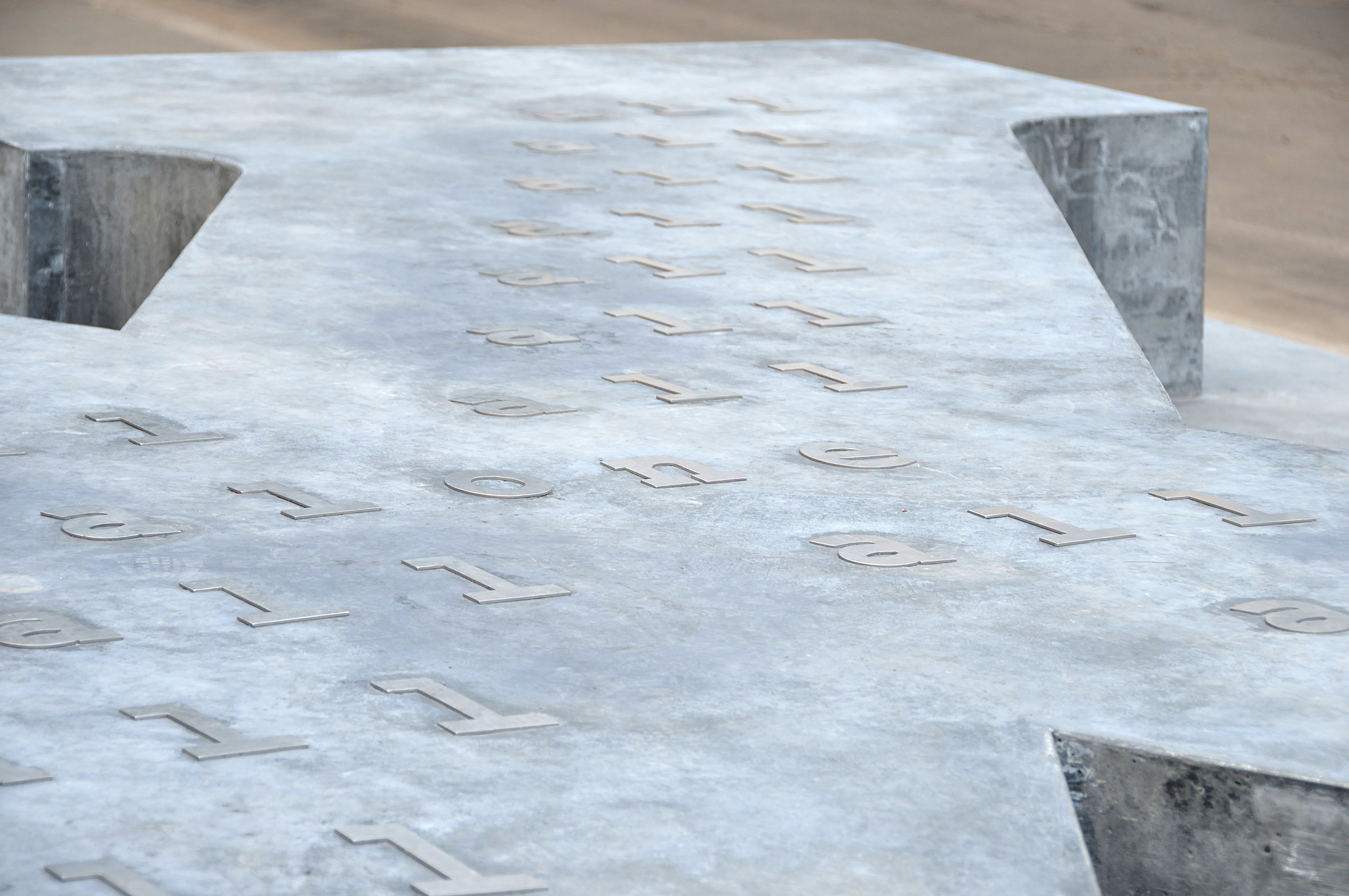
Detailed view of the monument

The monument represents an oversized, horizontal X, is cast in slightly bluish concrete and designed as a walkable or climbable monument. The inscription cannot be deciphered from street level. "According to the project description, the X is a "sign of anonymization to which the individual is subjected and which makes him a sign in a list, an X" in an act. On the other hand, the X is also a "statement of self-confident setting". One might think of the black civil rights activist Malcolm X." Olaf Nicolai "takes up the classical elements of a memorial, "pedestal" and "inscription", but arranges them completely differently from traditional war memorials." The pedestal is made up of three levels, with the inscription readable only from above embedded in its third level. The inscription, consisting of the words "all" and "alone", is based on a poem by the Scottish artist Ian Hamilton Finlay (1925–2006), in which the word "alone" is reproduced only once – at the intersection of the two strokes – while the word "all" is reproduced 32 times. "The interplay of pedestal and inscription stages the situation of the individual in and opposite social order and power relations".

"The deserters decision to face himself alone, to face himself outside a structure, a community, requires some personal courage. I myself know from my biography situations where I have experienced how people have made such decisions."

— Olaf Nicolai, Monuments are rather suspect to me, Der Standard, 24.October 2014

The artists intention therefore corresponds to the commission: "The sculpture shows respect to those who make their own decisions, oppose heteronomy and oppose the current system through their independent actions." "The original idea of painting the monument blue was rejected again, instead the paint was mixed into the concrete. According to KÖR, this is reminiscent of a "washed-out jeans blue," a color with which the artist associates the novel hero from Ulrich Plenzdorf's "Die neuen Leiden des jungen W." (The New Sufferings of the Young W.) – a drop-out who refuses.

== Opening ==
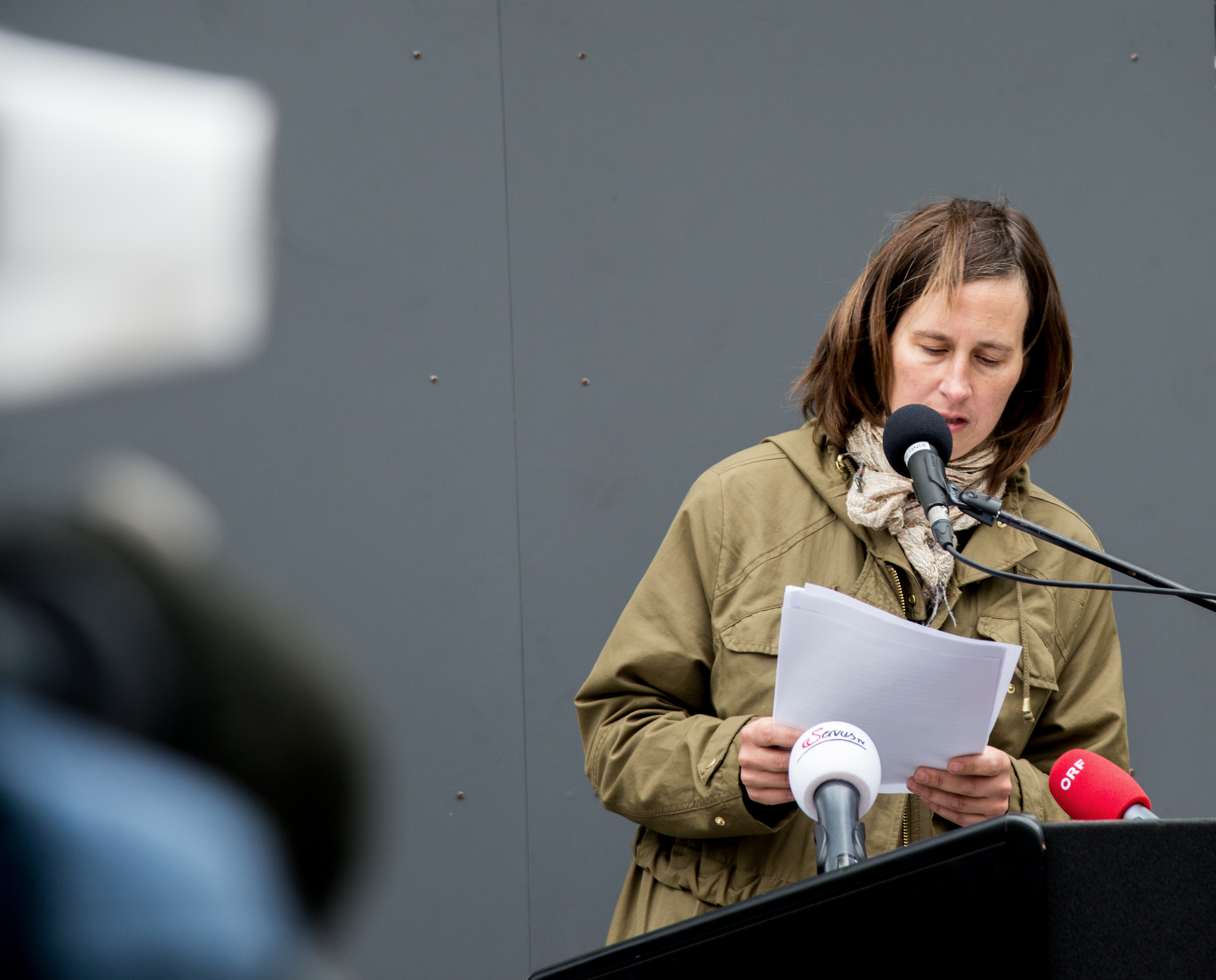
Kathrin Röggla

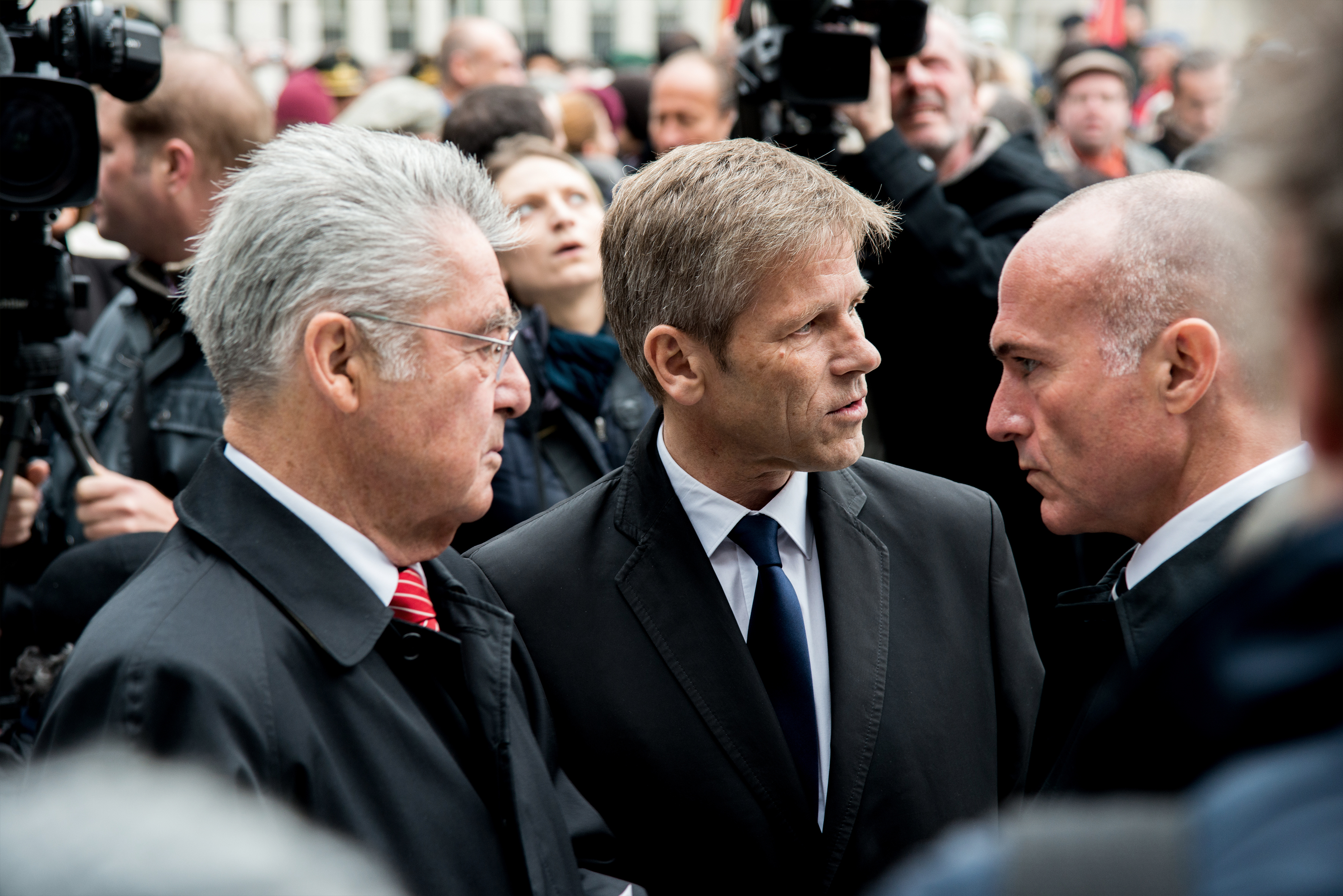
Fischer, Ostermayer and Klug at the opening

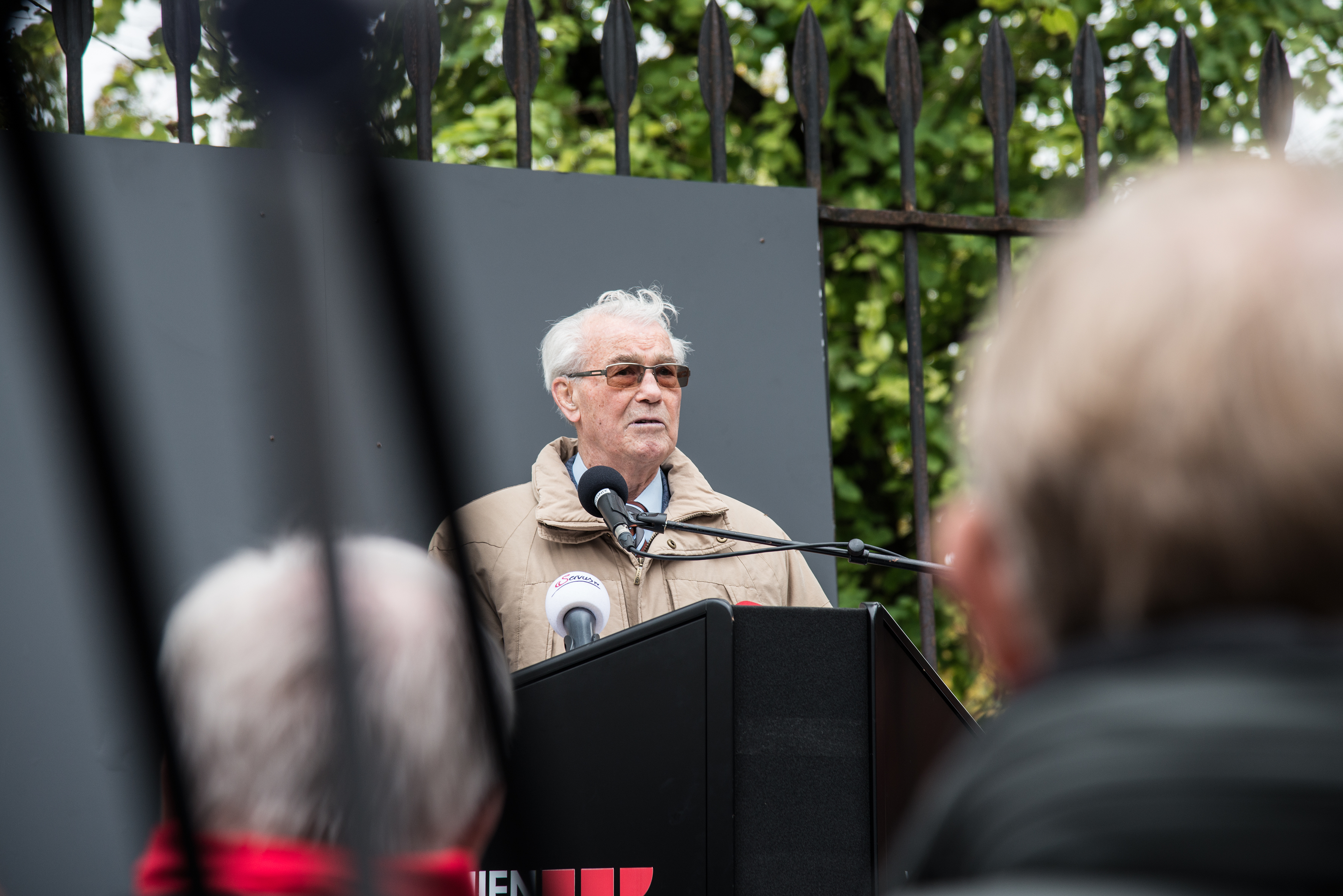
Richard Wadani speaks

Several hundred invited guests as well as numerous interested parties gathered on 24 October 2014 at the Ballhausplatz for the opening ceremony. The central speeches were held by David Ellensohn, Club Chairman of the Greens in Vienna, the deserter (and initiator of the law and monument) Richard Wadani, the writer Kathrin Röggla and Minister of Culture Josef Ostermayer (SPÖ), before Federal President Heinz Fischer opened the event:

"Everyone should know that it is honourable to follow ones conscience in the confrontation with a brutal and inhuman dictatorship and to be on the right side."

— Heinz Fischer, Fischer: Opening speech for the Memorial to the Persecuted of NS Military Justice,

David Ellensohn stressed, "Desertion is always an act of peace." Michael Häupl stated that deserters had finally asserted themselves as "part of the anti-fascist resistance". Political scientist, Walter Manoschek summarized in his speech that "It took almost 70 years". "A shadow remains, only few affected persons can still experience this comprehensive rehabilitation today”. Before, in between and afterwards there were artistic elements - a dance performance by Mikael Marklund, excerpts from Friedrich Cerha's Spiegel VI (from the tape) as well as the song "Sag Nein!", an excerpt from the "Ode to the Deserter" by Frederic Rzewski after texts by Wolfgang Borchert and Kurt Tucholsky. The choir Gegenstimmen sang.

== Resonance ==
The long duration of the recognition of this group of victims was generally felt to be painful. In his article in the Frankfurter Rundschau, Norbert Mappes-Niediek referred to the long delay in recognition as: "Early defended, late honoured" in which the article was titled.

== Critique ==
Ludwig Bieringer, president of the Austrian Kameradschaftsbund, a soldiers' and veterans' association, protested against the planned construction of a monument for deserters in Vienna at the taxpayers' expense, since desertion is a criminal offence in all constitutional states and a monument is therefore a repudiation of fallen soldiers.

The FPÖ voted in the National Council against the legal recognition of the deserters as a victim group and protested against the erection of a memorial at the Ballhausplatz site.
