= Rudolf Pöder =

Austrian politician

Rudolf Pöder (3 February 1925, Vienna – 9 June 2013, Vienna) was an Austrian politician from Social Democratic Party. He was President of the National Council (1989–1990). His profession was aircraft engine mechanic.
