= Heinz Fischer =

President of Austria from 2004 to 2016

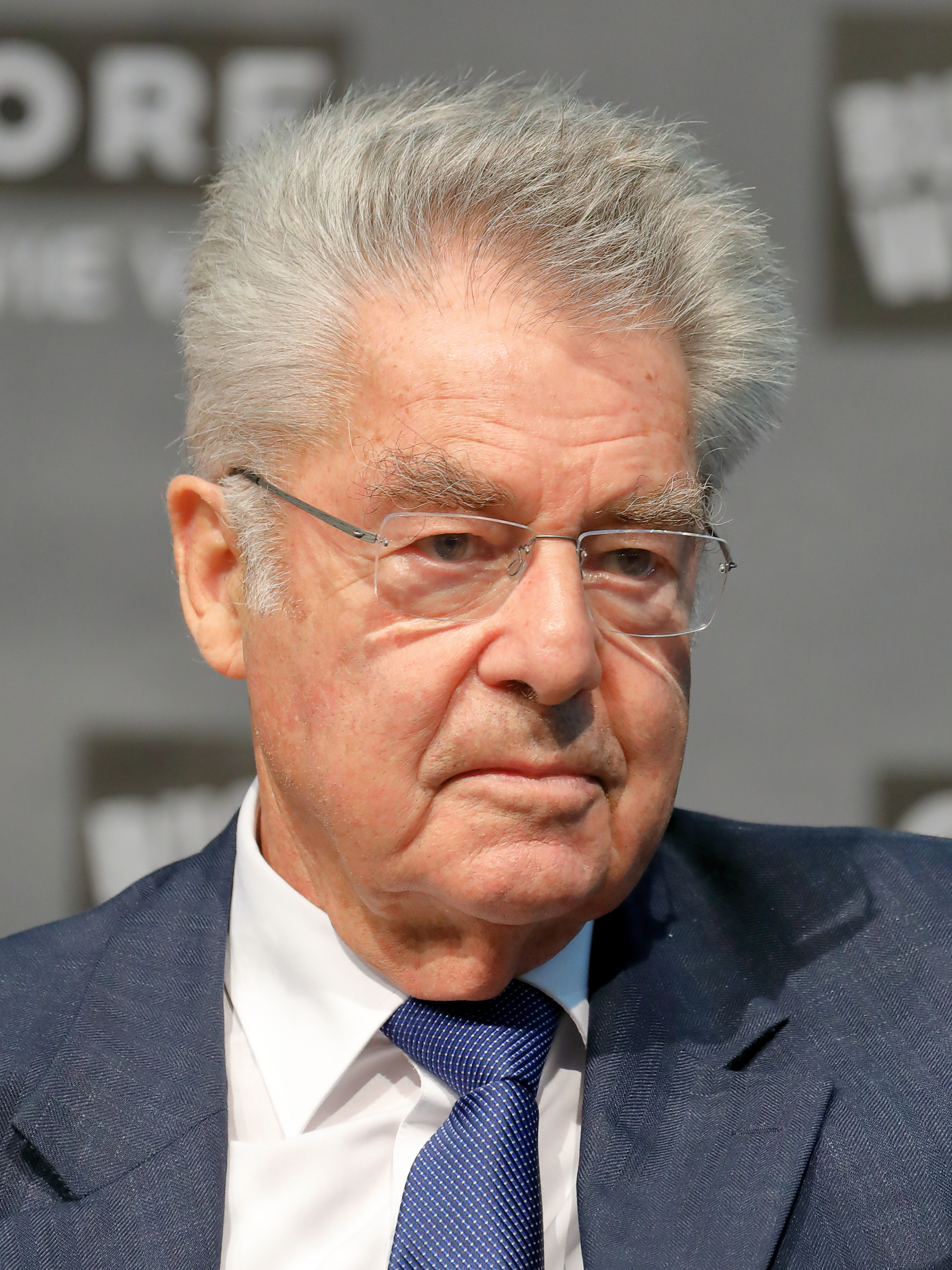
- Fischer in 2018

President of Austria
- In office 8 July 2004 – 8 July 2016
- Chancellor: Wolfgang Schüssel; Alfred Gusenbauer; Werner Faymann; Christian Kern
- Preceded by: Thomas Klestil
- Succeeded by: Alexander Van der Bellen

Second President of the National Council
- In office 20 December 2002 – 16 June 2004
- Preceded by: Thomas Prinzhorn
- Succeeded by: Barbara Prammer

President of the National Council
- In office 5 November 1990 – 20 December 2002
- Preceded by: Rudolf Pöder
- Succeeded by: Andreas Khol

Minister for Science and Research
- In office 24 May 1983 – 21 January 1987
- Chancellor: Fred Sinowatz; Franz Vranitzky
- Preceded by: Hertha Firnberg
- Succeeded by: Hans Tuppy

Personal details
- Born: 9 October 1938 (age 87) Graz, Reichsgau Steiermark, State of Austria, German Reich (now Graz, Styria, Austria)
- Party: Independent (2004–present)
- Other political affiliations: Social Democratic Party (until 2004)
- Spouse: Margit Binder (m. 1968)
- Children: 2
- Education: University of Vienna (PhD)

Military service
- Allegiance: Austria
- Branch/service: Austrian Armed Forces
- Years of service: 1958
- Unit: Heerestelegrafenbataillon Army Signal Corps

Heinz Fischer (German: [ˈhaɪnts ˈfɪʃɐ]; born 9 October 1938) is an Austrian politician who served as the president of Austria from 2004 to 2016. Fischer previously served as minister for science from 1983 to 1987 and as president of the National Council of Austria from 1990 to 2002. A member of the Social Democratic Party of Austria (SPÖ) until 2004, he suspended his party membership as he became president.

== Early life ==
Fischer was born in Graz, Styria, which had recently become part of Nazi Germany, following Germany's annexation of Austria in March 1938, but grew up in Vienna. Fischer attended a grammar school which focused on humanities and graduated in 1956. He studied law at the University of Vienna, earning a doctorate in 1961. Apart from being a politician, Fischer also pursued an academic career, and became a professor of Political Science at the University of Innsbruck in 1994.

== Political career ==
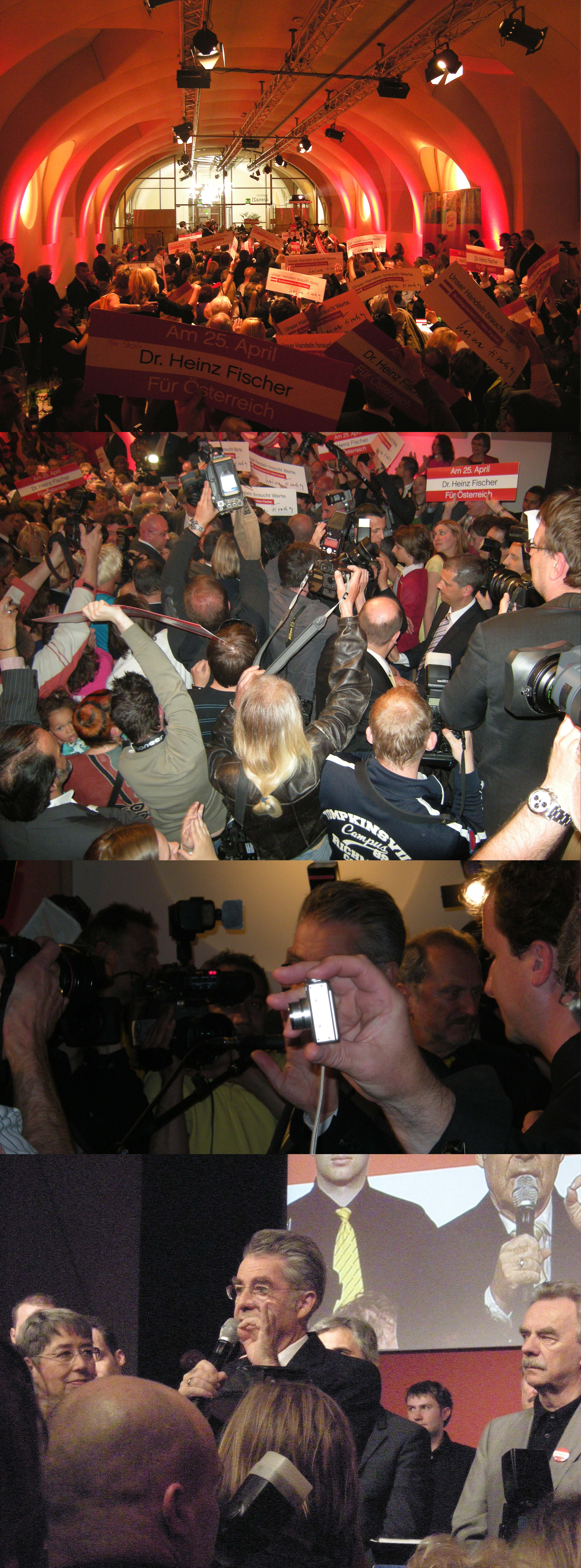
Re-election party in 2010

Fischer was a member of the Austrian parliament, the National Council, from 1971, and served as its president from 1990 to 2002. From 1983 to 1987 he was minister for science in a coalition government headed by Fred Sinowatz.

=== First term as president ===
In January 2004 Fischer announced that he would run for president to succeed Thomas Klestil. He was elected on 25 April 2004 as the candidate of the opposition Social Democratic Party. He polled 52.4 per cent of the votes to defeat Benita Ferrero-Waldner, then foreign minister in the ruling conservative coalition led by the People's Party.

Fischer was sworn in on 8 July 2004 and took over office from the college of presidents of the National Council, who had acted for the president following Klestil's death on 6 July.

=== Second term as president ===
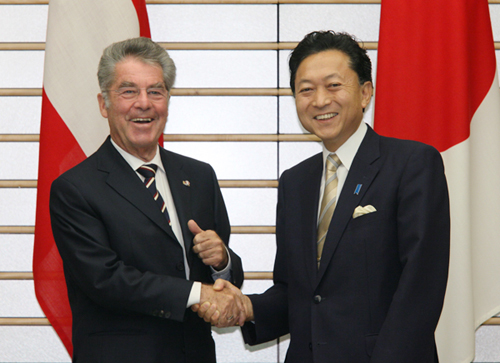
Fischer with Japanese prime minister Yukio Hatoyama in Tokyo on 30 September 2009

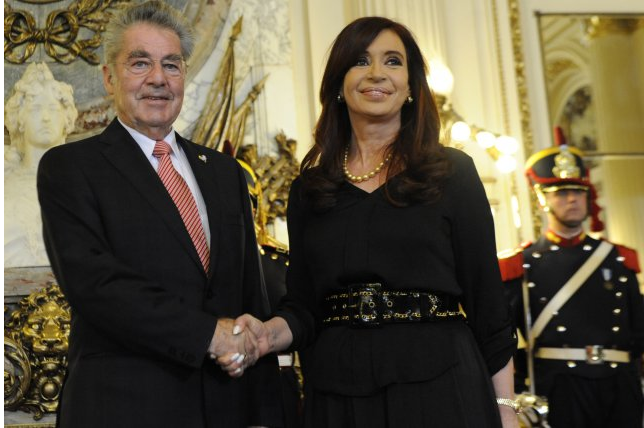
Fischer with Argentine president Cristina Fernández de Kirchner in the Pink House.

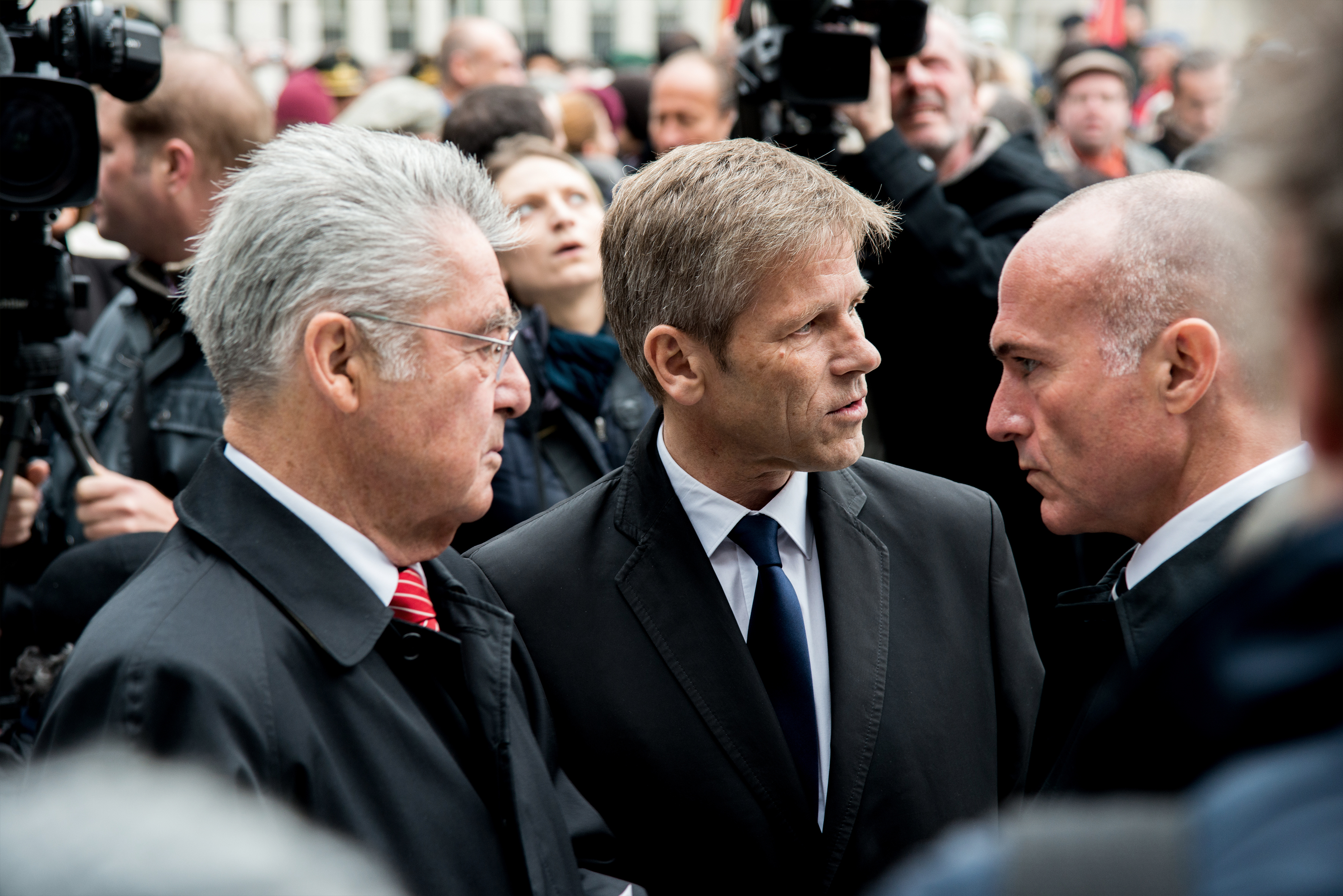
With ministers Ostermayer and Klug at the opening of the Memorial for the Victims of Nazi Military Justice on the Ballhausplatz

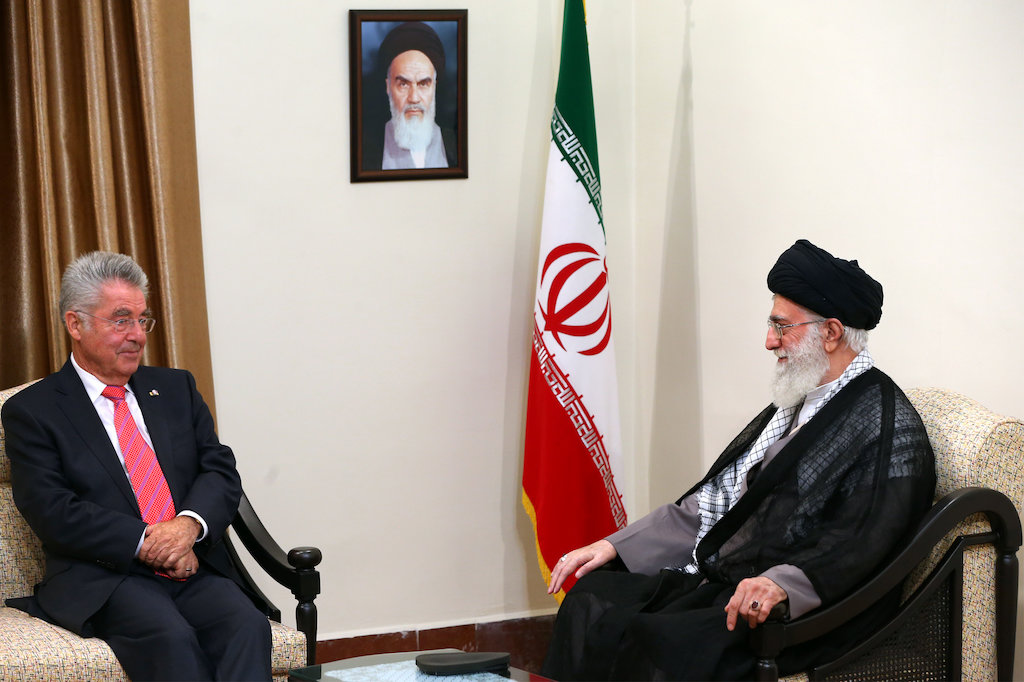
Fischer with Iranian supreme leader Ali Khamenei in Tehran on 8 September 2015

In April 2010, Fischer was re-elected president of Austria, winning a second six-year term in office with almost 79% of the votes. The voter turnout of merely 53.6% was a record low. Around a third of those eligible to vote voted for Fischer, leading the conservative daily Die Presse to describe the election as an "absolute majority for non-voters". The reasons behind the low turnout may have been that pollsters had predicted a safe victory for Fischer (past Austrian presidents running for a second term had always won) and that the other large party, ÖVP, had not nominated a candidate of their own, and had not endorsed any of the three candidates. Prominent ÖVP members, unofficially but in public, even suggested to cast a blank vote, which 7% of the voters did.

=== Post-presidency ===
In 2017, he and former UN secretary-general Ban-Ki Moon co-founded the Ban Ki-Moon Centre for Global Citizens, an international non-governmental organization to advance the Sustainable Development Goals, headquartered in Vienna.

== Personal life ==
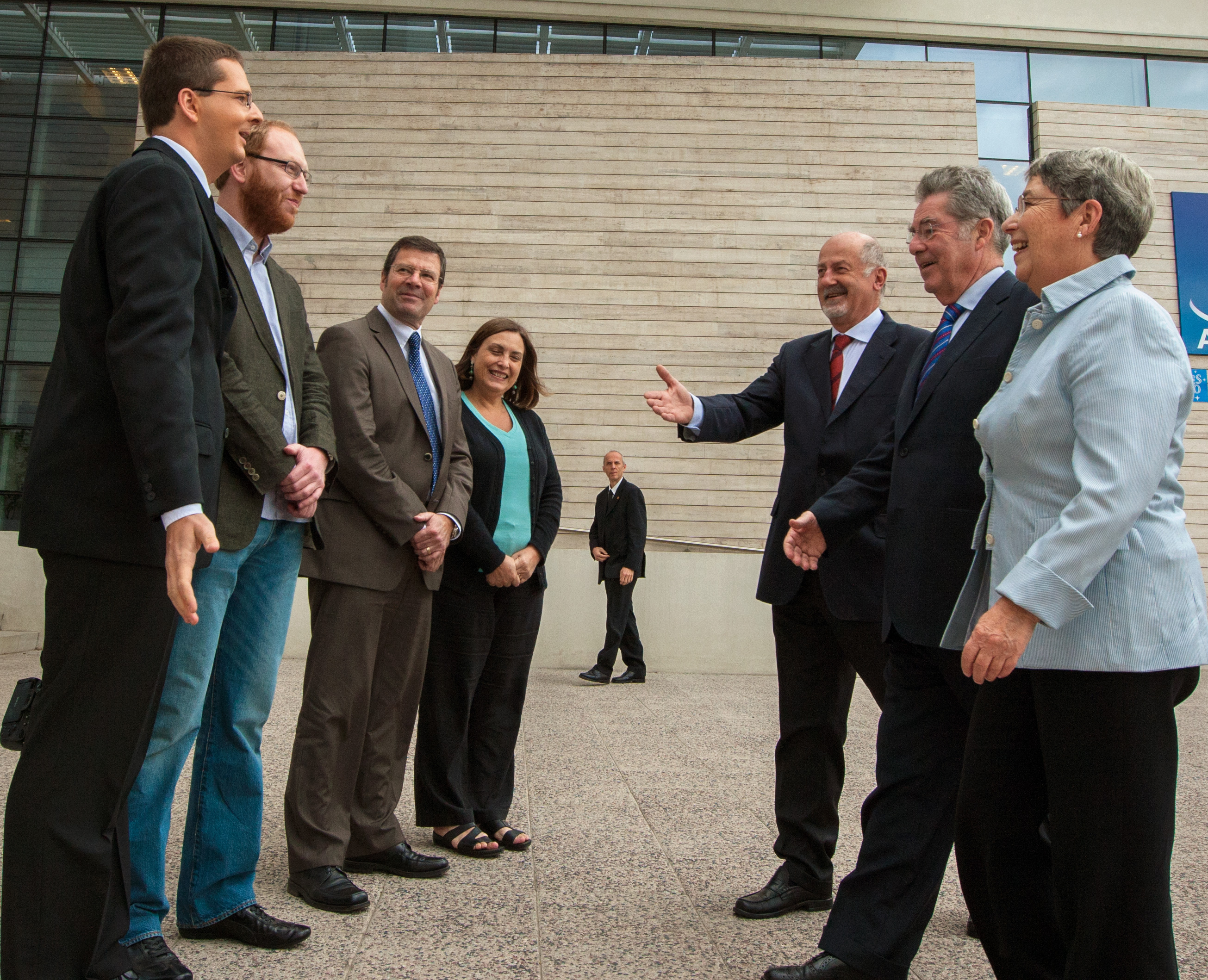
Heinz Fischer is welcomed to ESO's premises in Santiago.

Arms as knight of the Seraphim

Fischer identifies himself as agnostic and as a social democrat. He and Margit Binder married in 1968. The couple have two grown children.

Despite being members of opposing parties, Fischer was close friends with former ÖVP politician Sixtus Lanner.

He enjoys mountaineering and has been president of the Austrian Friends of Nature for many years.

== Honours and awards ==
=== National honours ===
==== Federal order ====
- 2004: Grand Star of Honour of the Decoration for Services to the Republic of Austria (Austria)

==== State honours ====
- 2008: Ring of Honour of the Province of Styria
- 2008: Freedom of the City of Graz

==== Awards ====
- 2009: Florianiplakette of the Austrian Federal Fire Association in gold

=== Foreign honours ===
==== Foreign orders ====
- 1993: Knight Grand Cross of the Order of Merit of the Italian Republic (Italy)
- 2005: Grand Collar of the Order of Prince Henry (Portugal)
- 2005: Grand Cross of the Order of Isabella the Catholic (Spain)
- 2006: Grand Cross of the Order of the Order of the White Rose of Finland (Finland)
- 2006: Grand Cross with Collar of the Order of Merit of the Republic of Hungary (Hungary)
- 2006: Collar of the Order pro merito Melitensi (Sovereign Military Order of Malta)
- 2007: Knight Grand Cross with Collar of the Order of Merit of the Italian Republic (Italy)
- 2007: Grand Cross of the Royal Norwegian Order of St. Olav (Norway)
- 2007: Knight of the Royal Order of the Seraphim (Sweden)
- 2009: Grand Cross with Golden Chain of the Order of Vytautas the Great (Lithuania)
- 2009: Grand Collar of the Order of Saint James of the Sword (Portugal)
- 2009: Grand Collar of the Order of the White Lion (Czech Republic)
- 2012: Collar of the Order of Merit (Chile)
- 2013: Grand Cross of the Legion of Honour (France)
- 2013: Knight of the Order of the Gold Lion of the House of Nassau (Luxembourg)
- 2014: National Flag Order (Albania)
- 2015: Grand Collar of the Order of the Condor of the Andes (Bolivia)
- 2016: Order of the Balkan Mountains (Bulgaria)

==== Foreign awards ====
- 2008: Honorary Doctorate of Law Faculty of the University of Tel Aviv
- 2009: Honorary Doctorate from the Ukrainian Academy of Sciences

== See also ==
- List of national leaders
- Politics of Austria

Political offices
Preceded by Rudolf Pöder	President of the National Council; 1990–2002	Succeeded by Andreas Khol
Preceded by Thomas Klestil	President of Austria; 2004–2016	Succeeded by Alexander Van der Bellen
