= Dorfschwalben aus Österreich =

Viennese waltz composed by Josef Strauss in 1864 or 1865

Section from "Dorfschwalben aus Österreich" (2:47)
July 6, 1929 Record

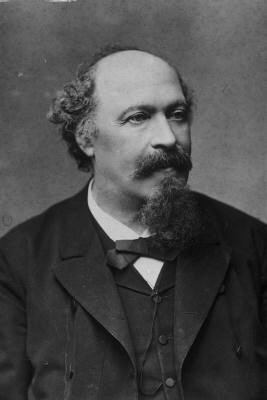
August Silberstein

Dorfschwalben aus Österreich (Village Swallows from Austria), Op. 164, is a Viennese waltz composed by Josef Strauss in 1864 or 1865.

It was inspired by August Silberstein's novel Dorfschwalben aus Österreich. It was premiered at the Volksgarten, Vienna, on September 6, 1864 (1865?). The polka-mazurka "Frauenherz" was premiered at the same time. Both compositions were played during Josef Strauss's memorial ceremony under the direction of his brother, Johann Strauss II.

== Vienna New Year's Concert ==
It was played the Vienna New Year's Concert in these years:

- 1947 – Josef Krips
- 1956 – Willi Boskovsky
- 1963 – Willi Boskovsky
- 1977 – Willi Boskovsky
- 1986 – Lorin Maazel
- 1992 – Carlos Kleiber
- 2001 – Nikolaus Harnoncourt
- 2008 – Georges Prêtre
- 2015 – Zubin Mehta
- 2025 – Riccardo Muti
