= Op. 166 =

In music, Op. 166 stands for Opus number 166. Compositions that are assigned this number include:

- Rheinberger – Suite for Violin and Organ
- Saint-Saëns – Oboe Sonata
- Schubert – Octet
- Josef Strauss – Frauenherz
