= Op. 164 =

In music, Op. 164 stands for Opus number 164. Compositions that are assigned this number include:

- Rheinberger – Der Stern von Bethlehem
- Saint-Saëns – Aux conquérants de l'air
- Schubert – Piano Sonata in A minor
- Strauss – Dorfschwalben aus Österreich
