= Frauenherz =

Frauenherz ('A Woman's Heart') op. 166 is a polka-mazurka composed by Josef Strauss in 1864 (1865?).

It was premiered at the Volksgarten, Vienna on September 6, 1864 (1865?). Waltz Dorfschwalben aus Österreich was also premiered at the same time. Frauenherz and Dorfschwalben aus Österreich were played during Josef Strauss's memorial ceremony under the direction of his brother.
