= Polka-mazurka =

The polka-mazurka is a dance, musically similar to the mazurka, but danced much like the polka. Many polka-mazurkas were composed by Johann Strauss II and his family. Johann Strauss I did not compose any of this type of music; the first polka-mazurka example written by the Strauss family was in the year 1854 by Johann Strauss II, entitled La Viennoise op. 144.The polka-mazurka was not credited to the Strauss family alone, as many Viennese composers in the 1850s era also wrote many examples. This variant of the polka was seen as cross-cultural, as many of its influences can be seen in the French-polka with its feminine and deliberate steps as well as the exciting schnell-polka, where Eduard Strauss composed many famous pieces of this type.

== Polka-mazurka music ==
Its tempo of 3 beats to the bar (3/4 time) meant that it was similar in rhythm to the waltz, but the emphasis of the polka-mazurka was on the first beat of the bar as opposed to the waltz which places its beats on the last two as epitomised by the Viennese waltz with its heavily accentuated final two beats to the bar.

The polka-mazurka does possess a similar structure to the polka, with a main theme quickly proceeding to its subsidiary theme which is usually brash and loudly played. The 'trio' section is free-style and need not associate with the main theme nor of the same key signature. The Strauss family, Josef Strauss in particular, attempted in most of his famous polka-mazurkas to blend in sensitivity and romanticism, as can be heard in his pieces Sympathie op. 73, and Frauenherz op. 166, which were inspired by his concern for social issues faced by women in that era.

== See also ==
- Polska 3/4-time Nordic folk dance
- Polonaise - slow dance of Polish origin, in 3/4 time
