= Volksgarten, Vienna =

Urban park in Vienna, Austria

Coordinates: 48°12′29″N 16°21′40″E

Volksgarten
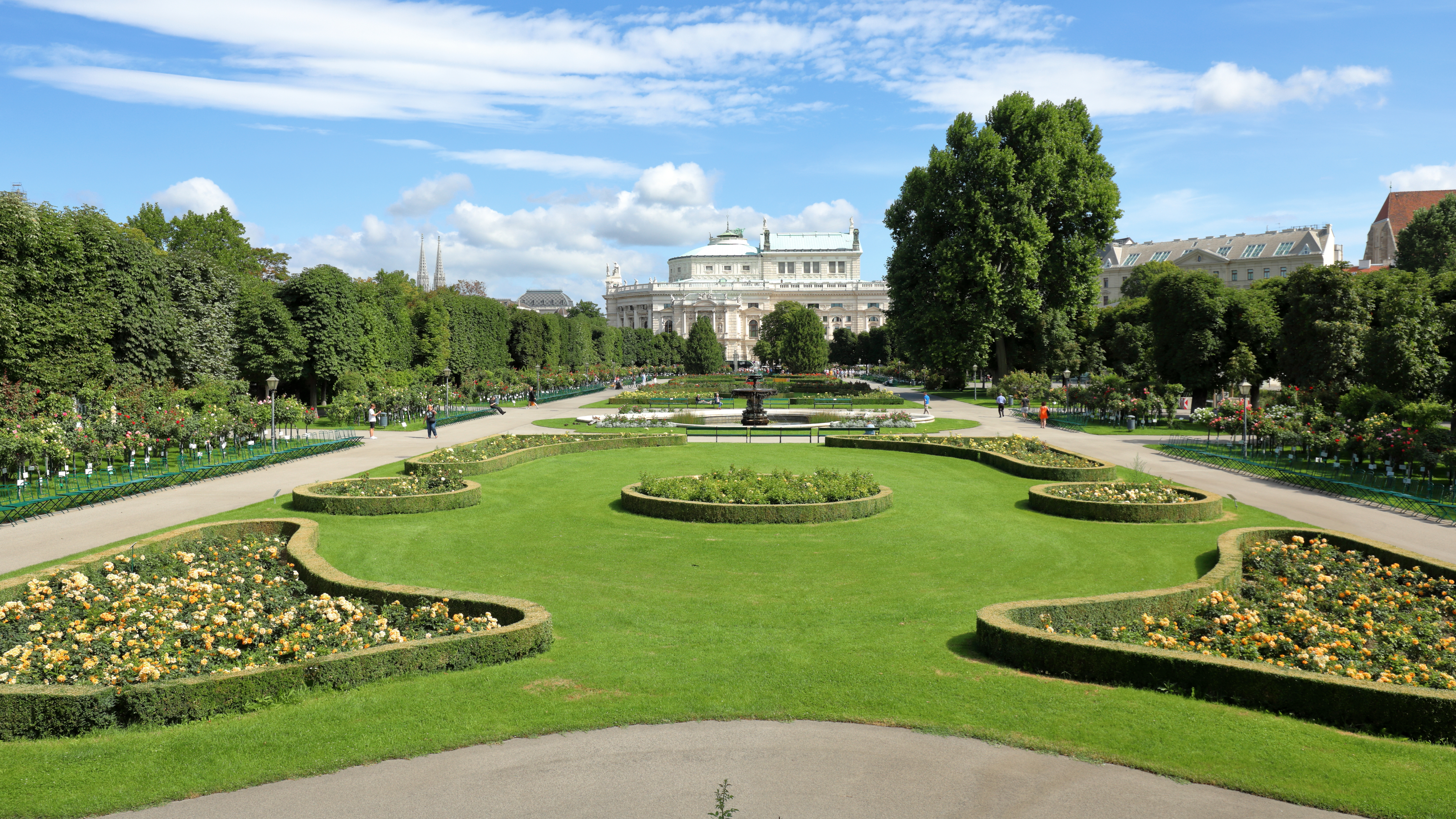
- Interactive map of Volksgarten
- Type: Public park
- Location: Innere Stadt, Vienna, Austria
- Area: 5 hectares (12 acres)
- Opened: 1823
- Status: Open year-round
- Website: www.bundesgaerten.at/hofburggaerten/Volksgarten.html

The Volksgarten is a public park in the Innere Stadt, the first district of Vienna, Austria. Opened in 1823, it was Vienna's first public park.

== History ==
In 1809, following France's decisive victory over Austria in the War of the Fifth Coalition, French troops occupying Vienna destroyed a major defensive bastion of the Hofburg, the Burgbastei. Instead of rebuilding it, the area around the Hofburg was redesigned. Court architect Ludwig Gabriel von Remy planned the construction of what is now known as the Heldenplatz, flanked on either side by two parks: the Volksgarten and the Burggarten. Remy collaborated with gardener Franz Antoine the Elder, who was responsible for the horticultural design.

During the park’s construction, architect Pietro Nobile designed the Theseustempel, a recreation of the Temple of Hephaestus in Athens, built specifically to house Theseus Slaying the Centaur, a statue by Antonio Canova. The adjacent Paradeisgartel, located on the fortification wall, was redesigned during the creation of the Volksgarten and later connected to the park by a ramp.

The park was officially opened on 1 May 1823. Two coffee houses, one in the Volksgarten and one in the Paradeisgartel, were constructed, both owned by Peter Corti. The coffee houses attracted many visitors and hosted numerous concerts, including performances by Joseph Lanner and Johann Strauss I.

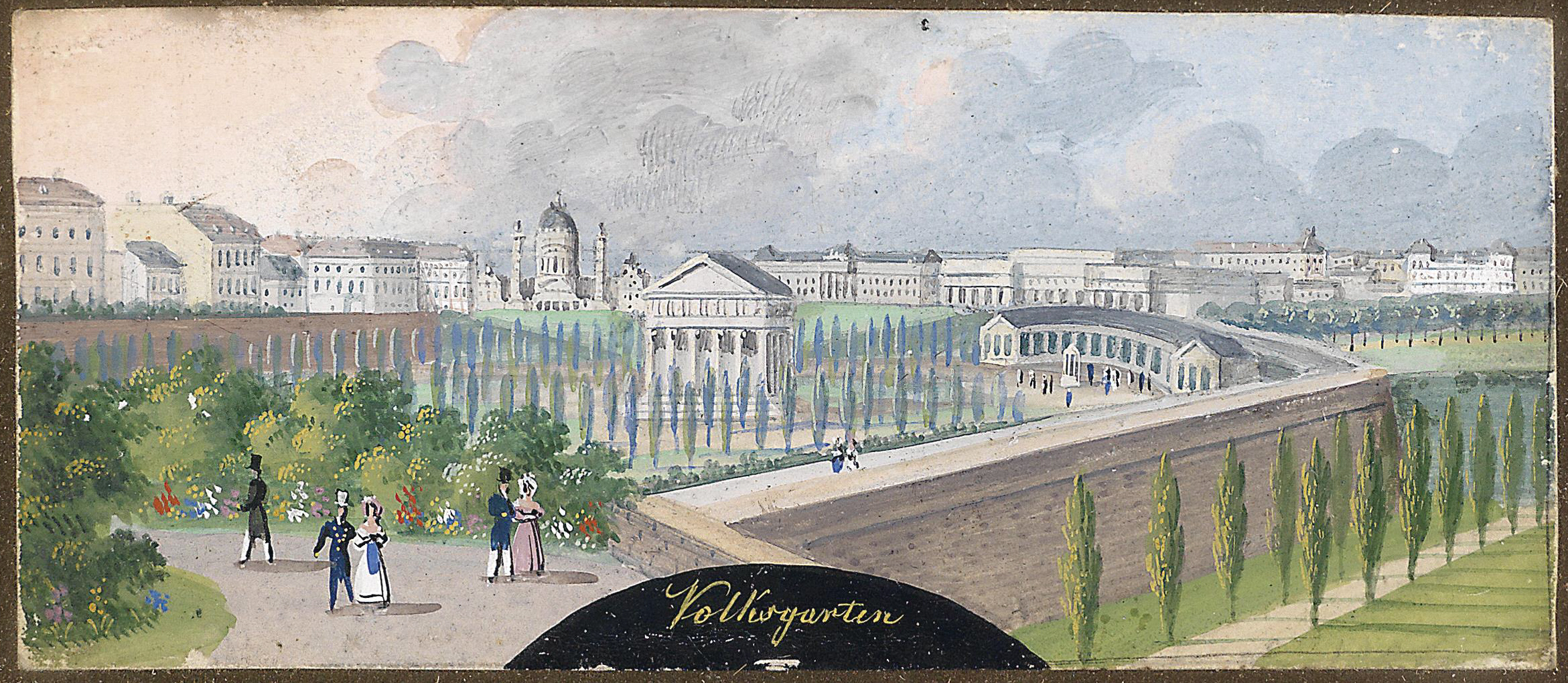
"Wien, Karlskirche" by Balthasar Wigand, 1846 (The Volksgarten was still on the city walls at the time)

The park was expanded during the construction of the Ringstraße. The wall separating it from Heldenplatz was removed, allowing for an outward extension. Between 1883 and 1884, the Volksgarten was further expanded by Franz Antoine the Younger. However, this section was later redesigned by Friedrich Ohmann between 1903 and 1907.

The Volksgarten was originally intended to be replaced by the Kaiserforum, with a mirrored wing of the Neue Hofburg planned for its location. However, the outbreak of World War I and the subsequent collapse of Austria-Hungary rendered the project obsolete.

== Features ==
=== Gardens ===
The Volksgarten on the side of the Hofburg is designed as an English-style park with trees in an loose avenue formation, and on the Ringstraßen side as a French Baroque garden with a more architecturally rigid layout.

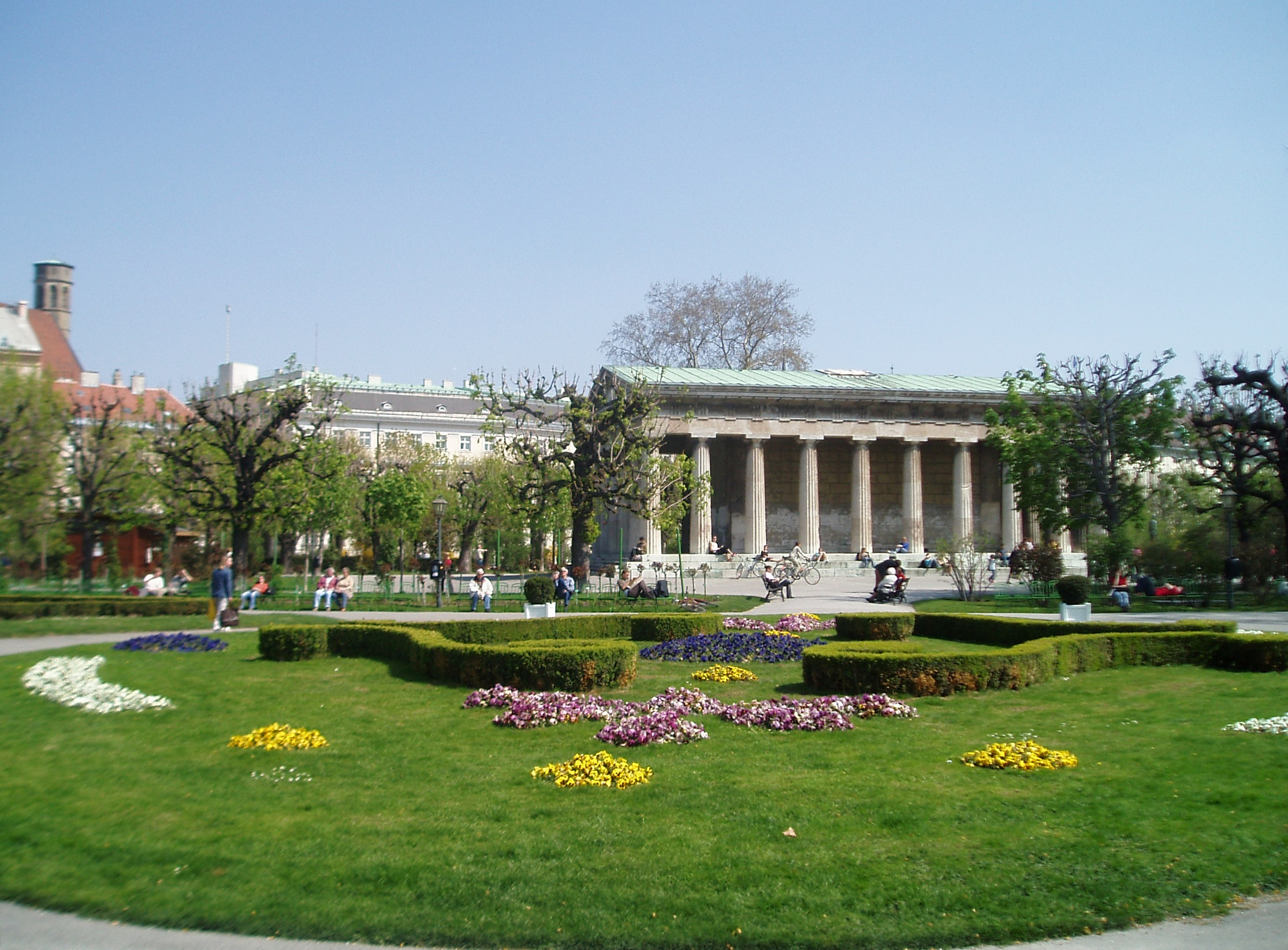
English garden and the Theseustempel

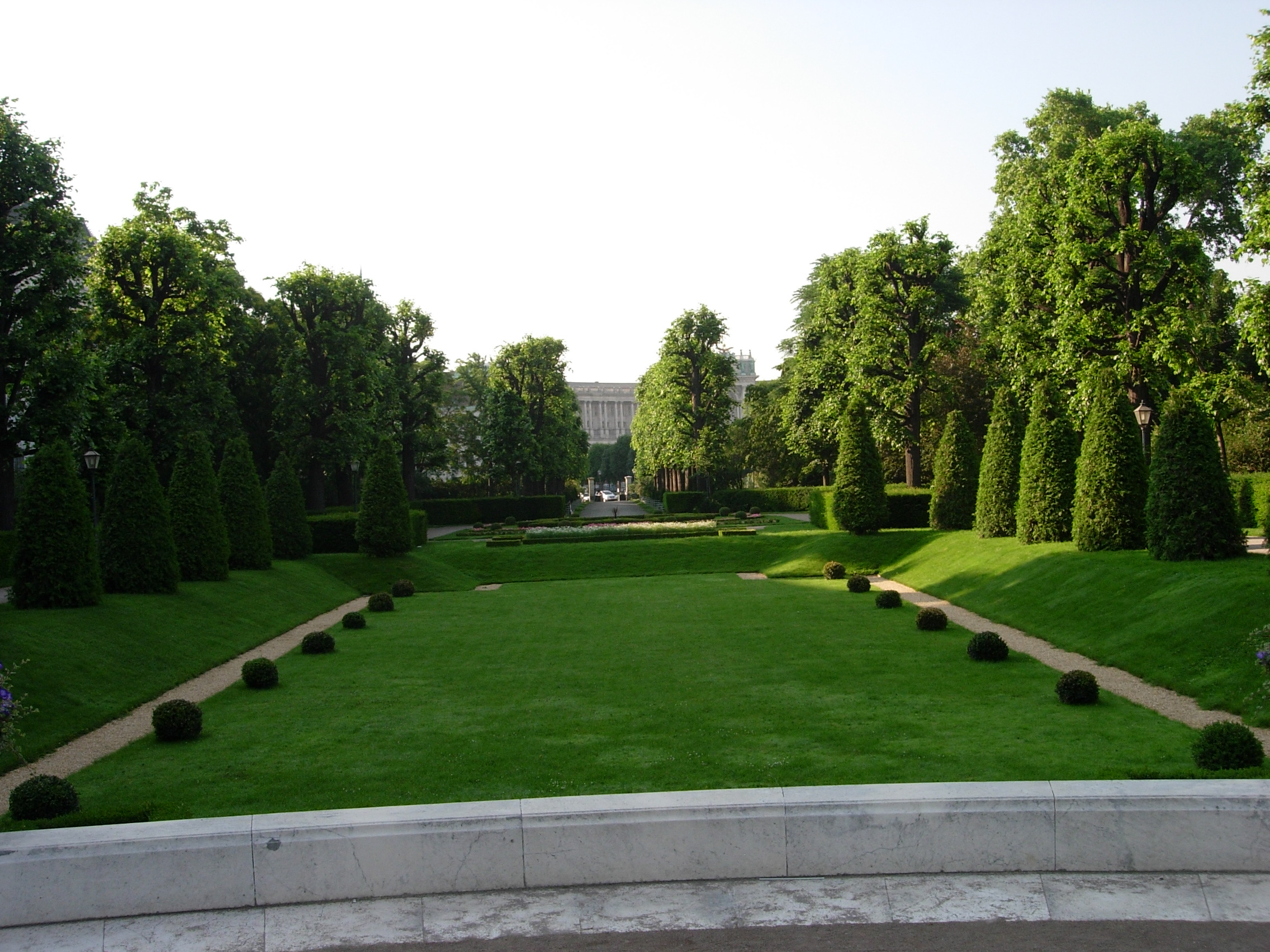
Section in front of the Sisi monument

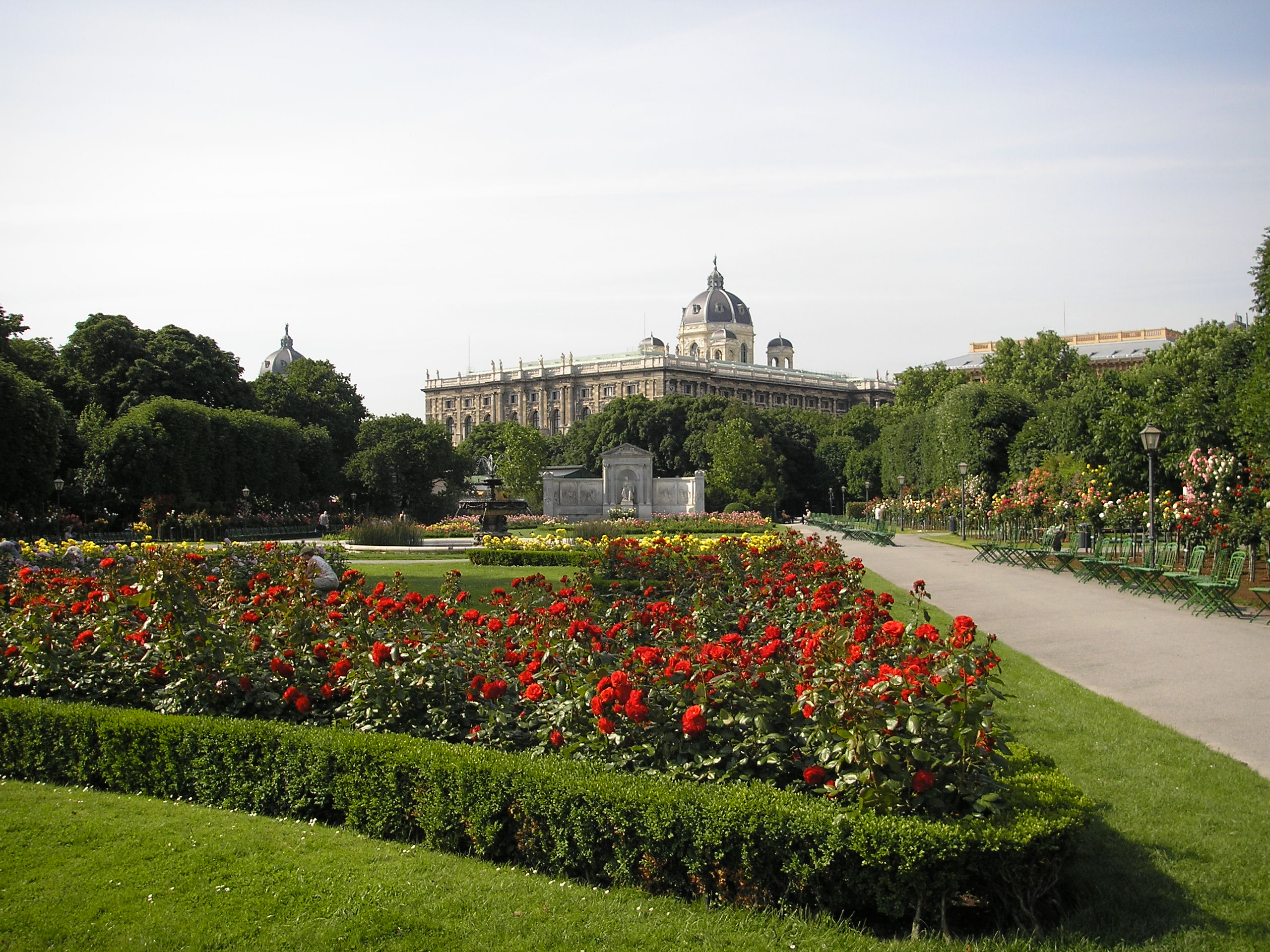
French garden on the Ringstraße side

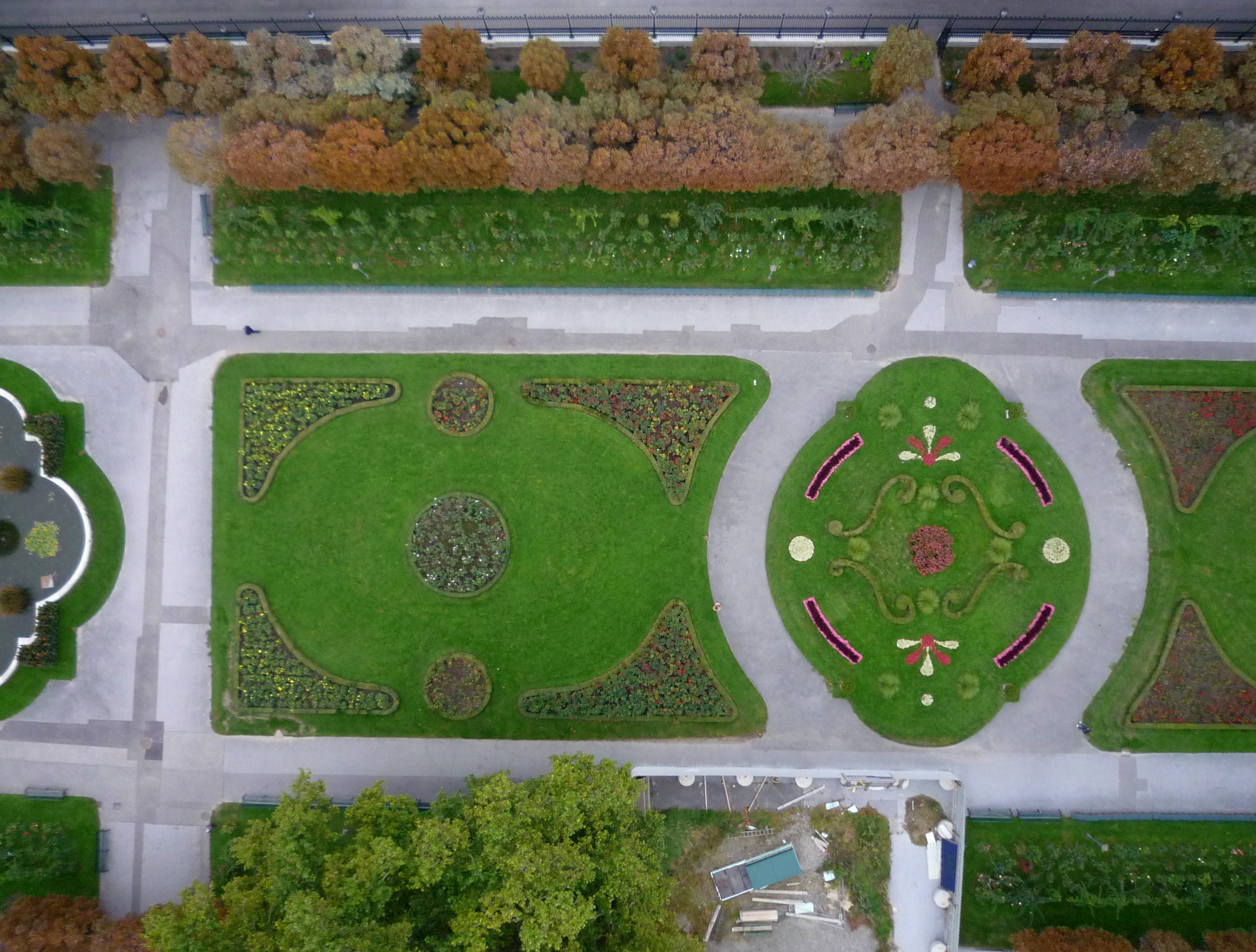
The Baroque garden

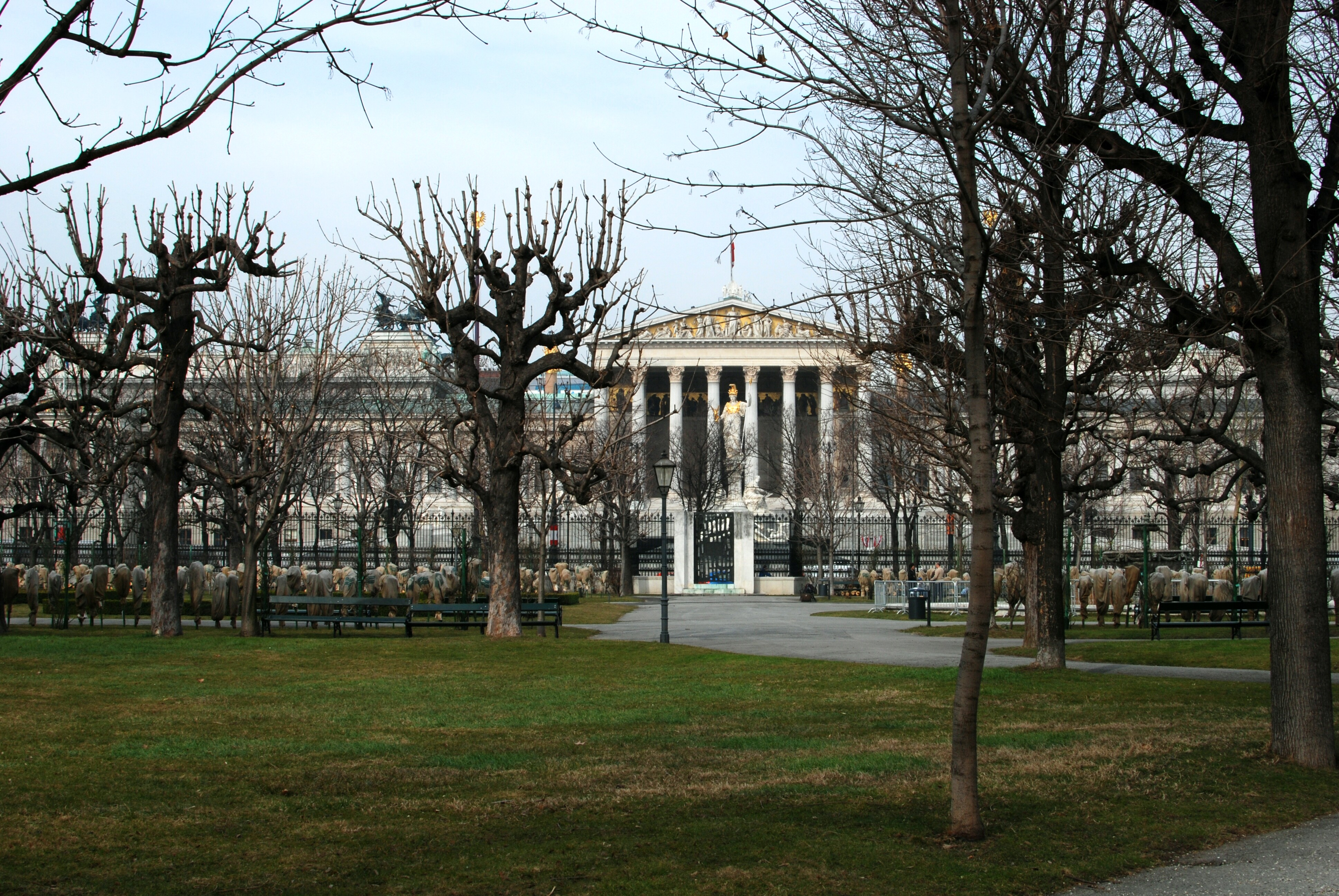
Trees opposite the Parliament

=== Rose garden ===
Between the entrance near the Burgtheater and the Grillparzer Monument is a rose garden featuring over 3,000 rose bushes representing more than 200 varieties. The central area consists of rose beds enclosed by boxwood hedges, containing the majority of the roses. The garden’s perimeter features the largest variety of roses, arranged in successive rows of standard roses followed by climbing roses. Most rose varieties within the garden are labeled.

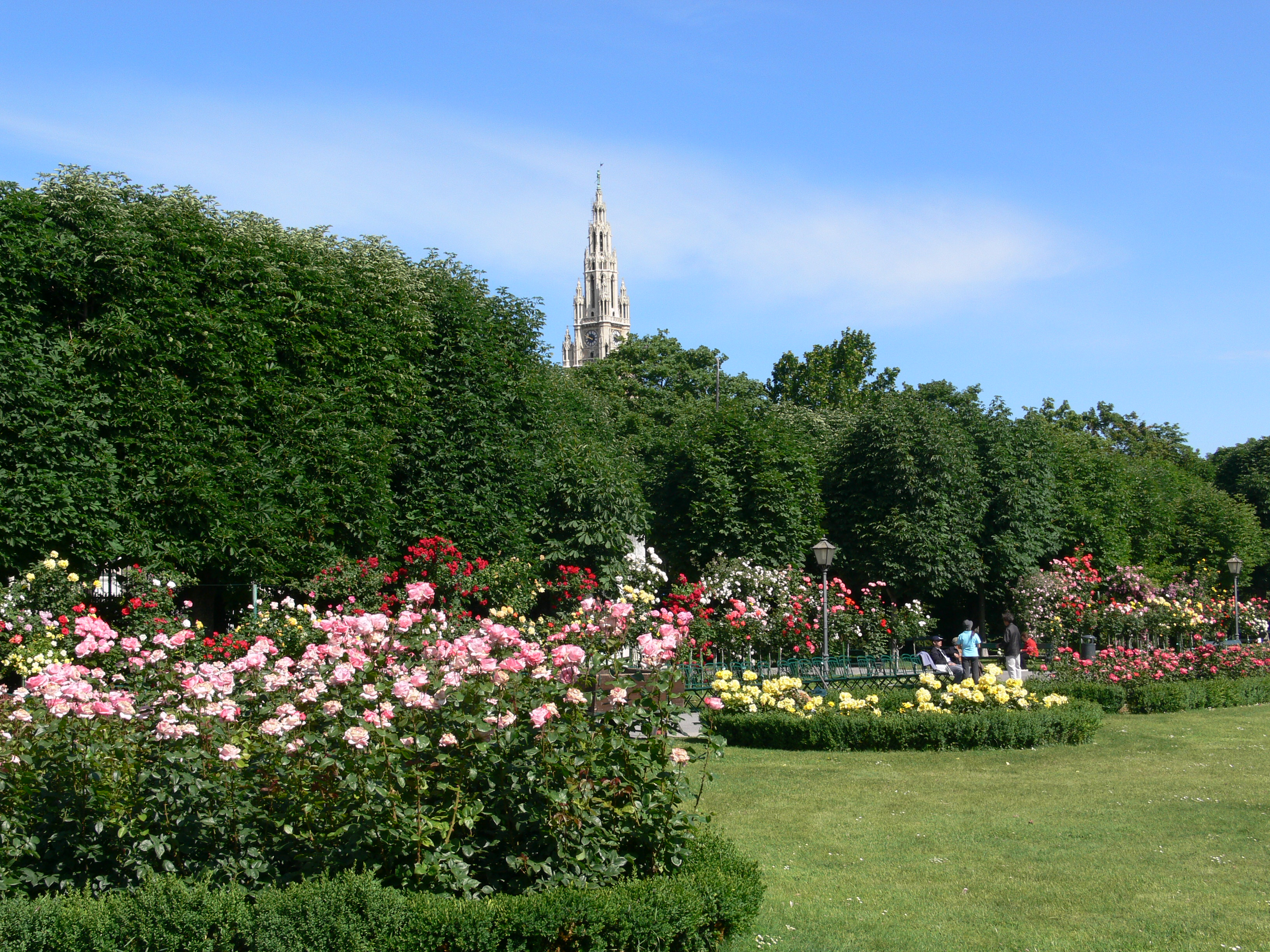
Roses in the south

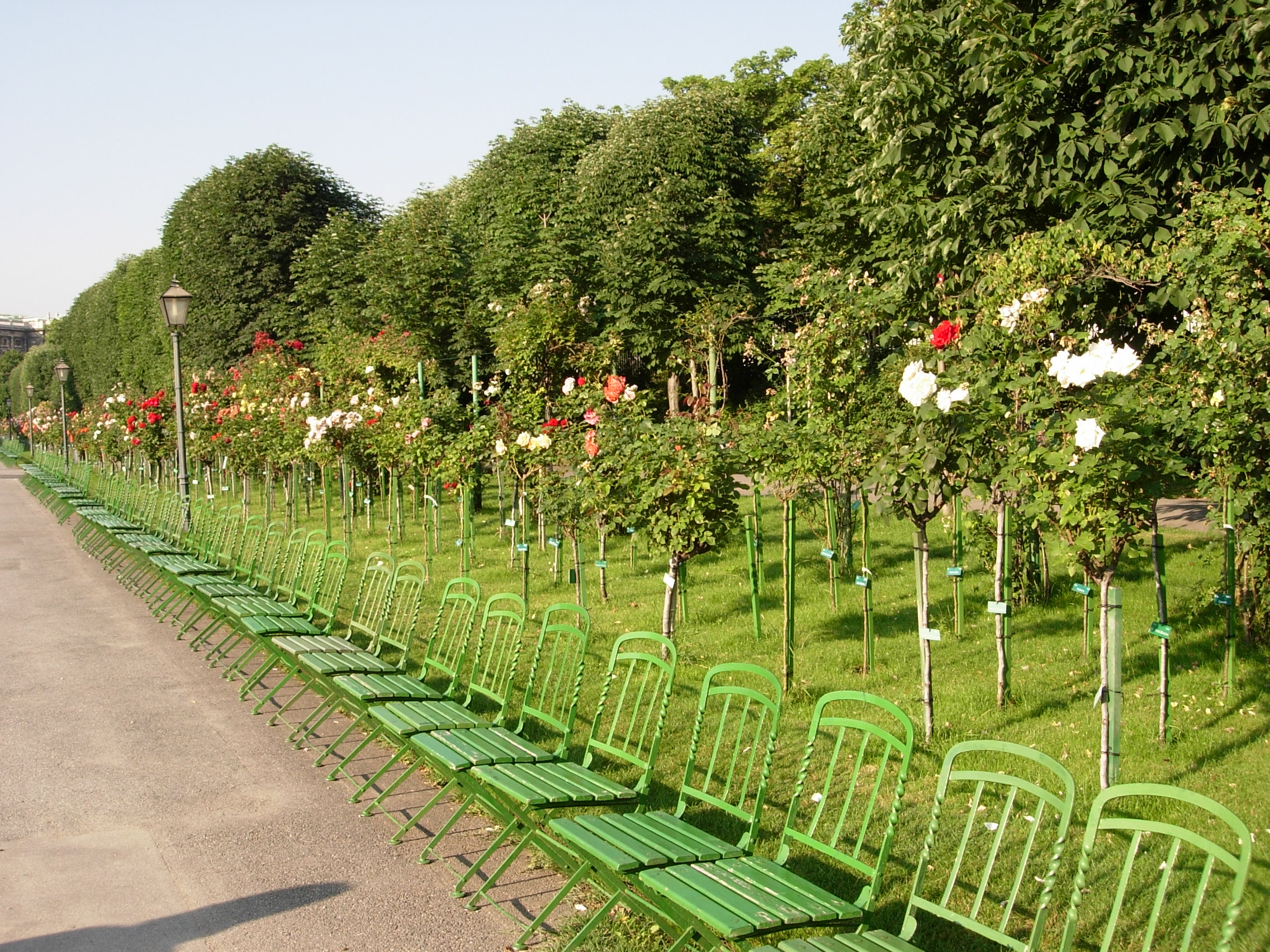
By the Ringstraße

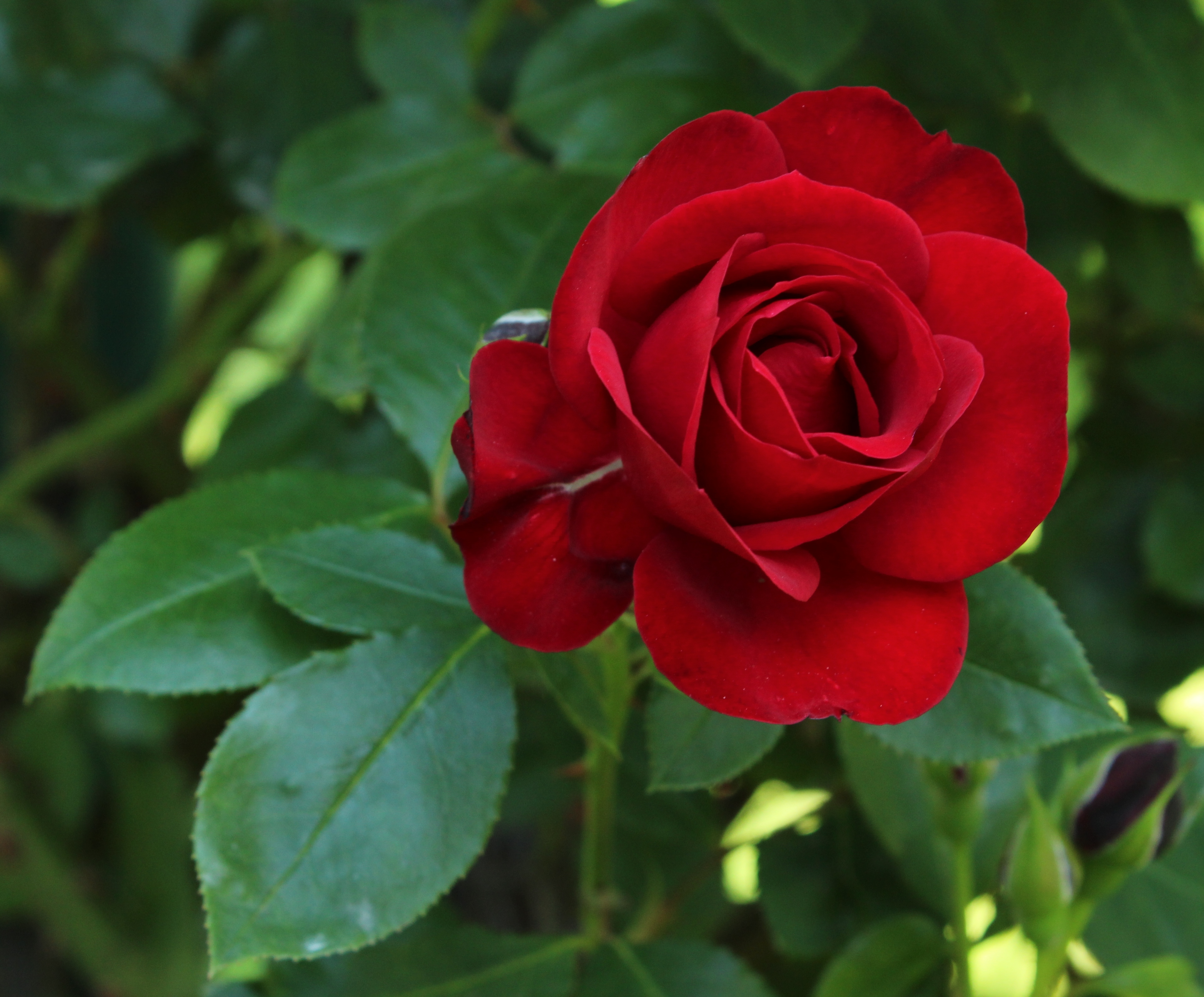
Exploit

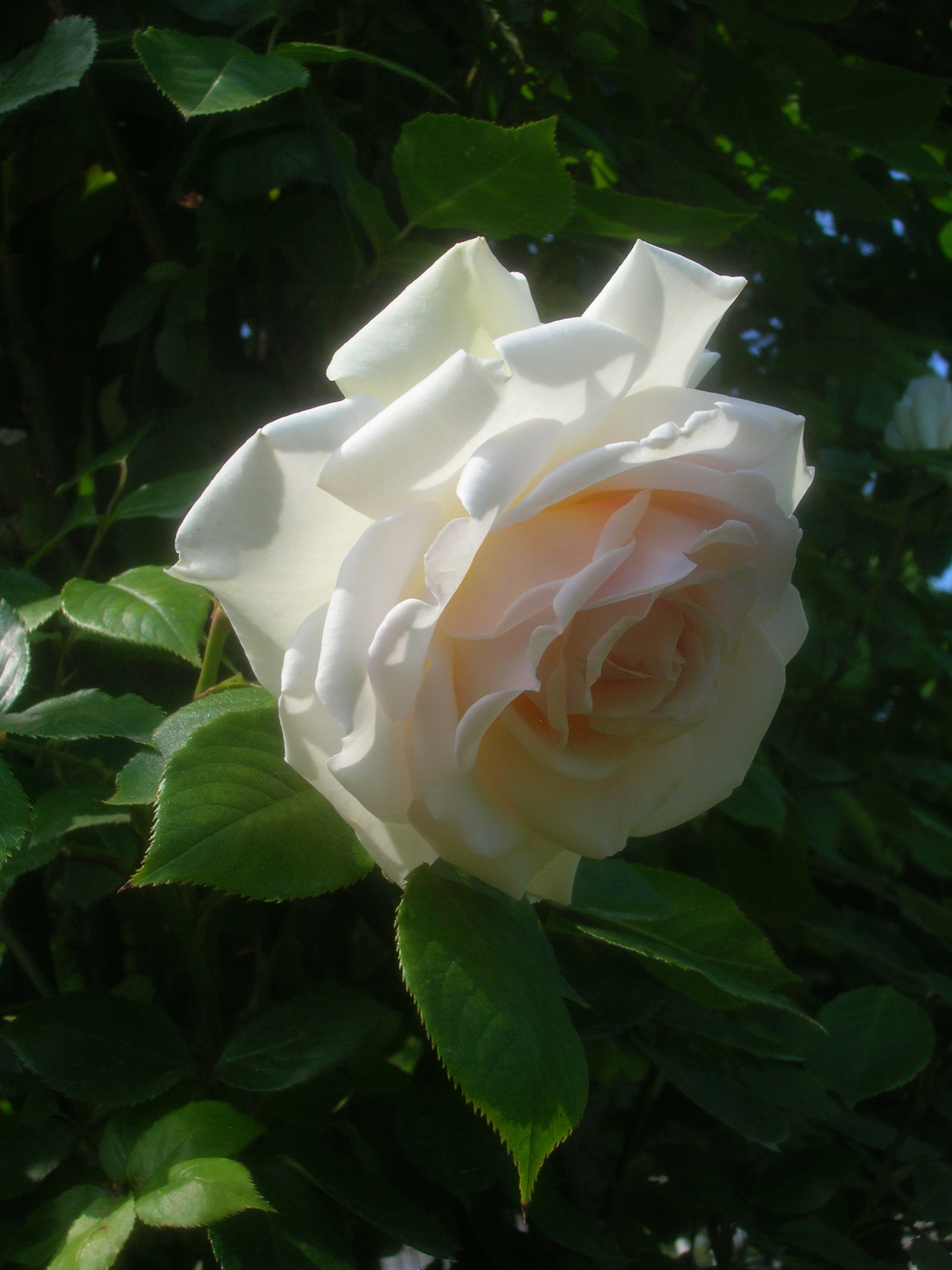
Schwanensee

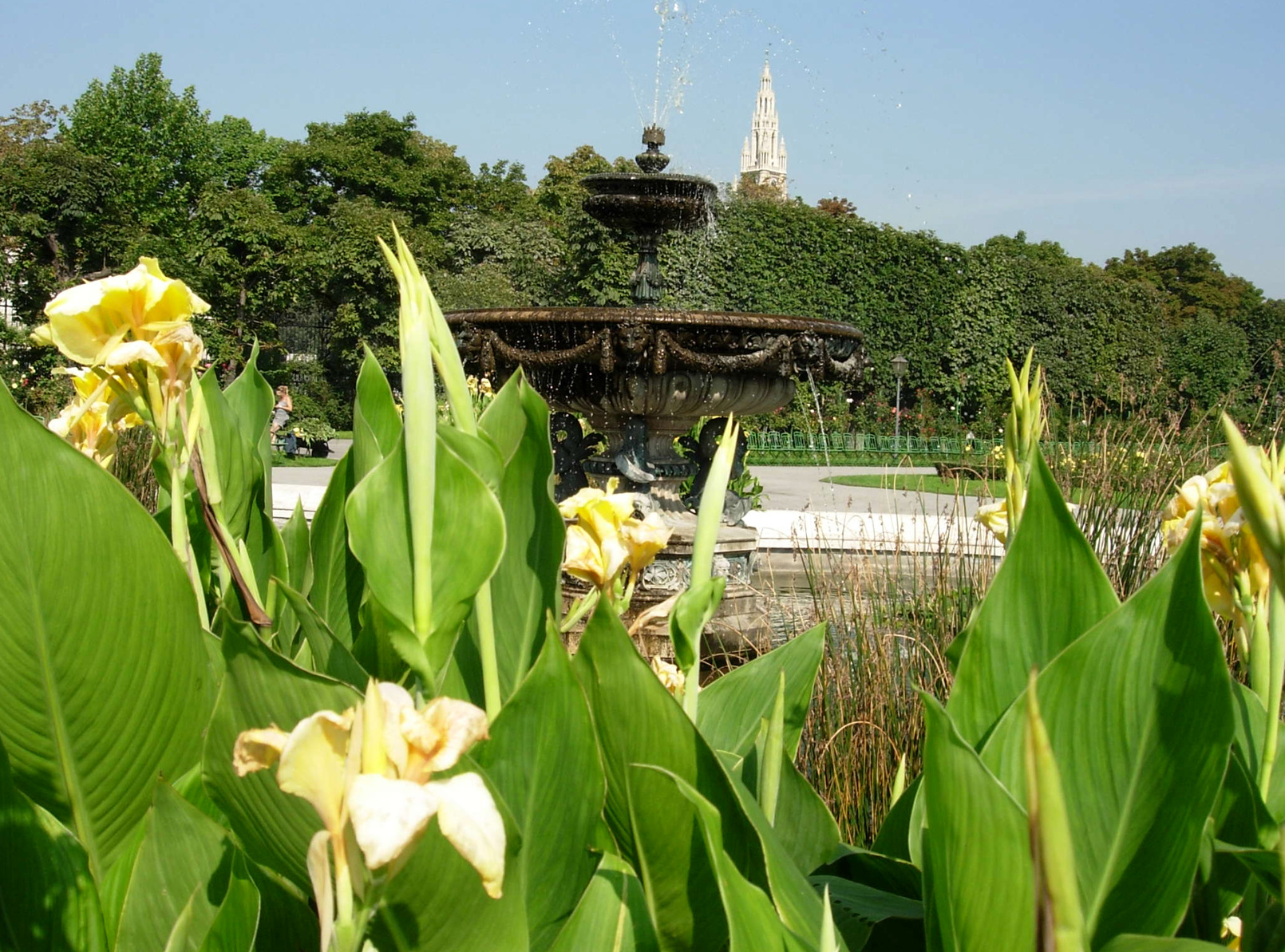
Biotope growth of the Volksgartenfountain

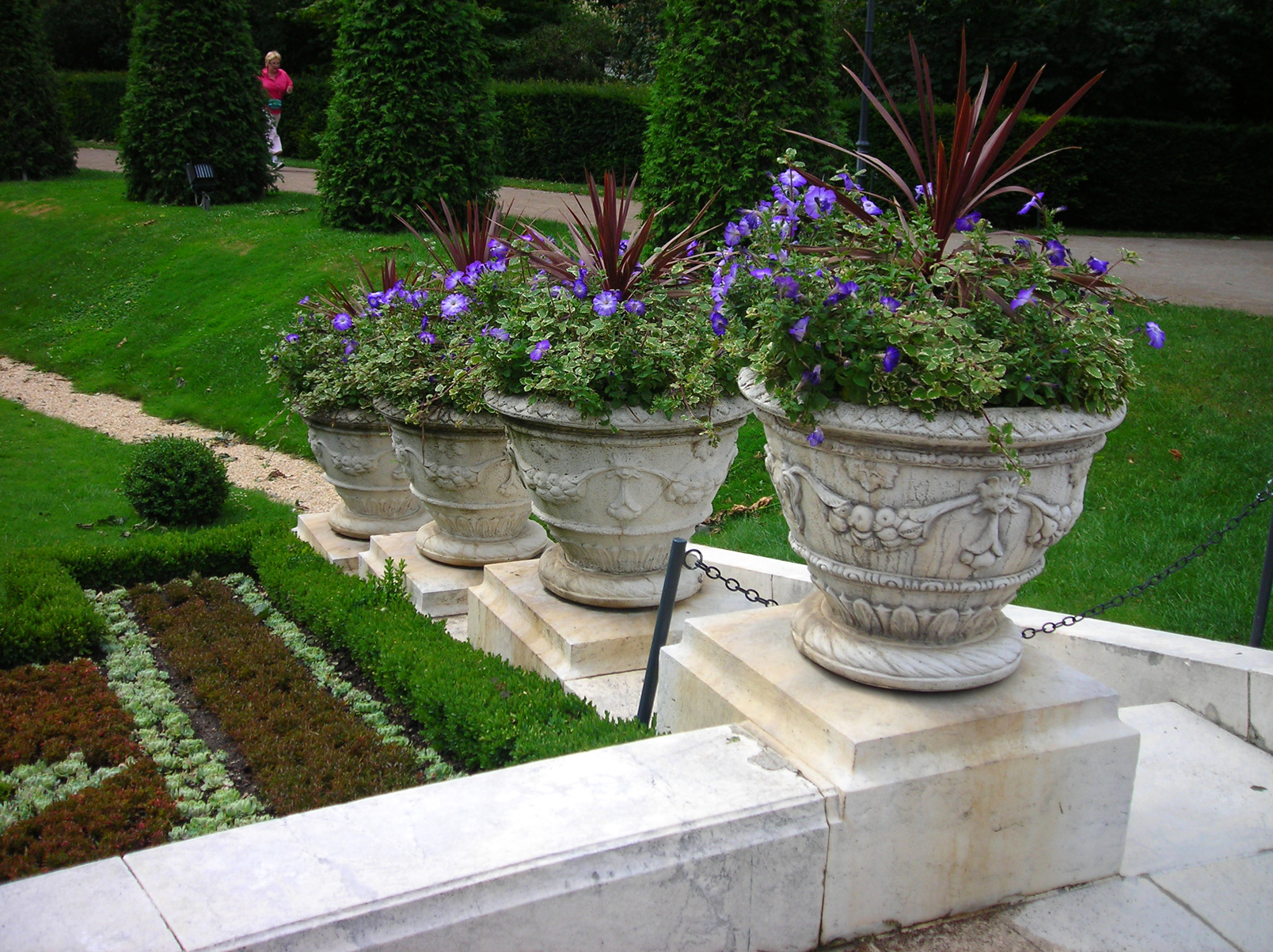
Vases and flowerbeds by the Sisi monument

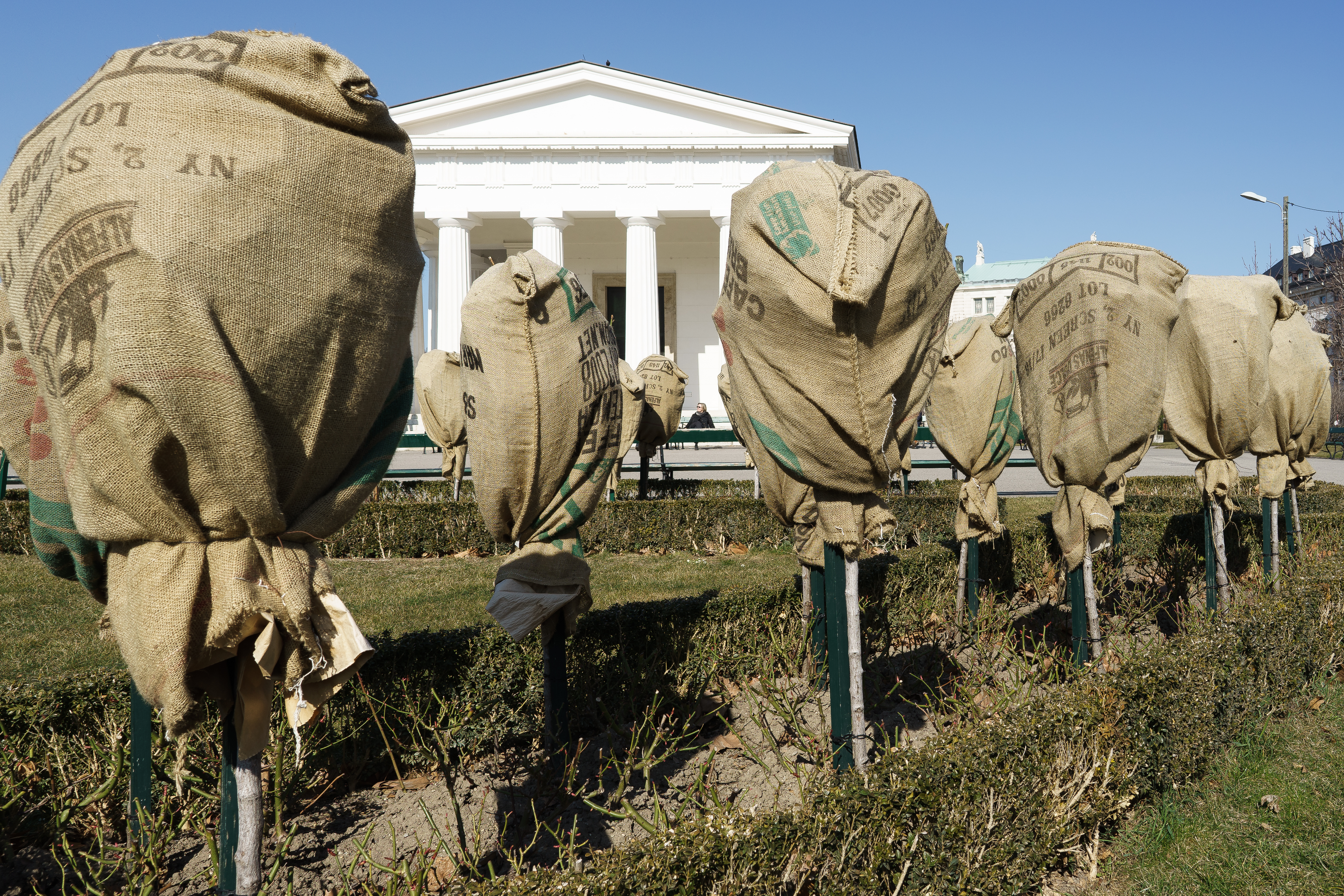
Roses under winter protection

=== Buildings ===
- Theseustempel: Erected before the opening of the park, the temple is a reconstruction of the Temple of Hephaestus in the Agora of Athens. It was built specifically to house the Theseusgruppe, a marble sculpture by Antonio Canova of Theseus slaying a centaur, originally intended for Napoleon Bonaparte, which was acquired by Emperor Franz I after Napoleon's downfall. Its catacombs served as storage for the Kaiser’s antique collection and were open to the public. However, the antiques had to be removed due to dampness. In 1890, the Theseusgruppe was relocated to the Kunsthistorisches Museum. A bronze statue of a young athlete by Joseph Müller was placed in front of the temple in 1921. Renovated in 2010, it now serves the Kunsthistorisches Museum as an exhibition space.
- Öffentliche Bedürfnisanstalt (public toilet): Built in 1884, it is one of the oldest public toilets in the city.
- Volksgarten disco: The Corti coffeehouse was repurposed as a nightclub in 1974. It had been previously redesigned in a still-preserved 50s style by Oswald Haerdtl.
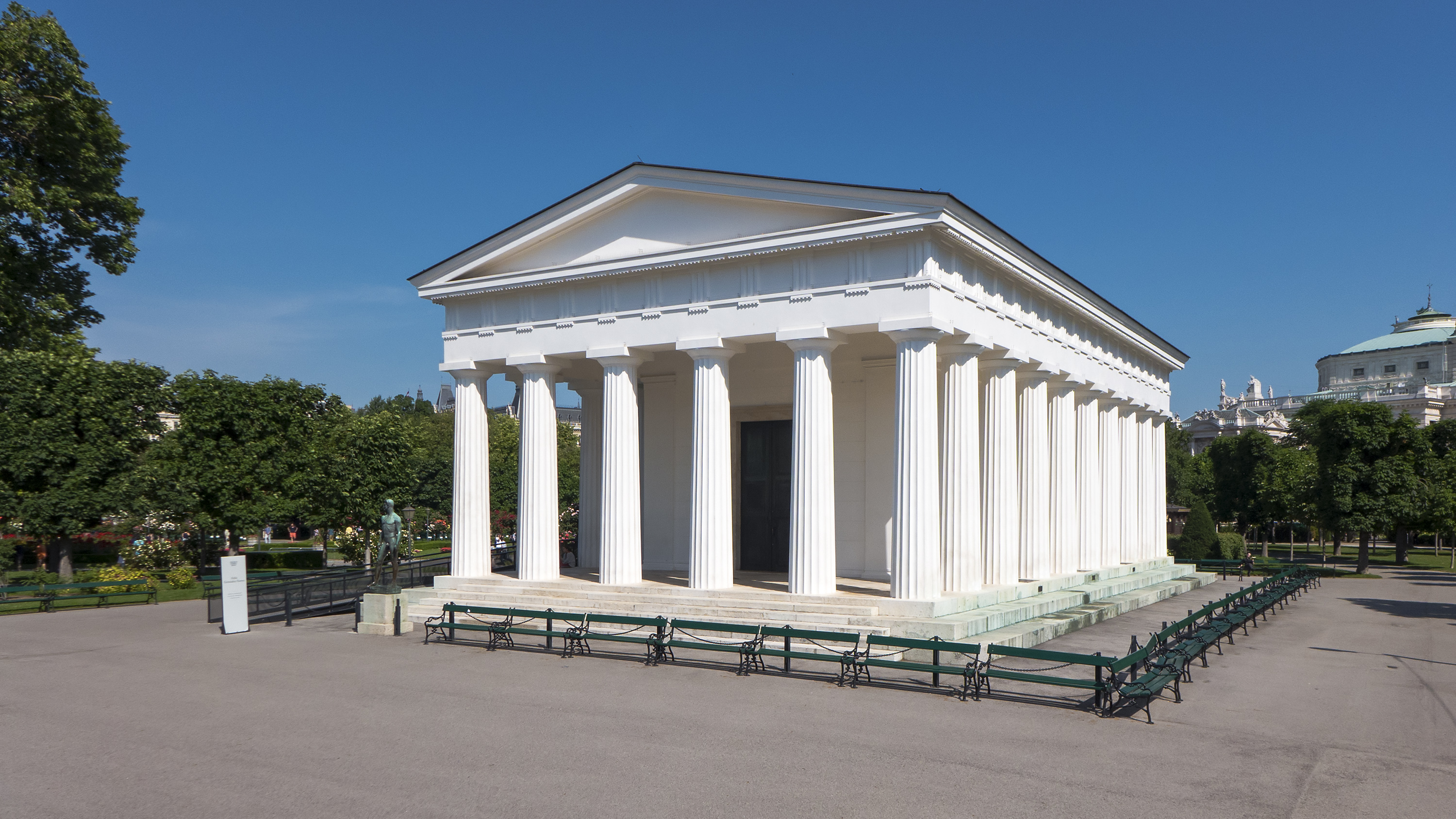
Theseustempel

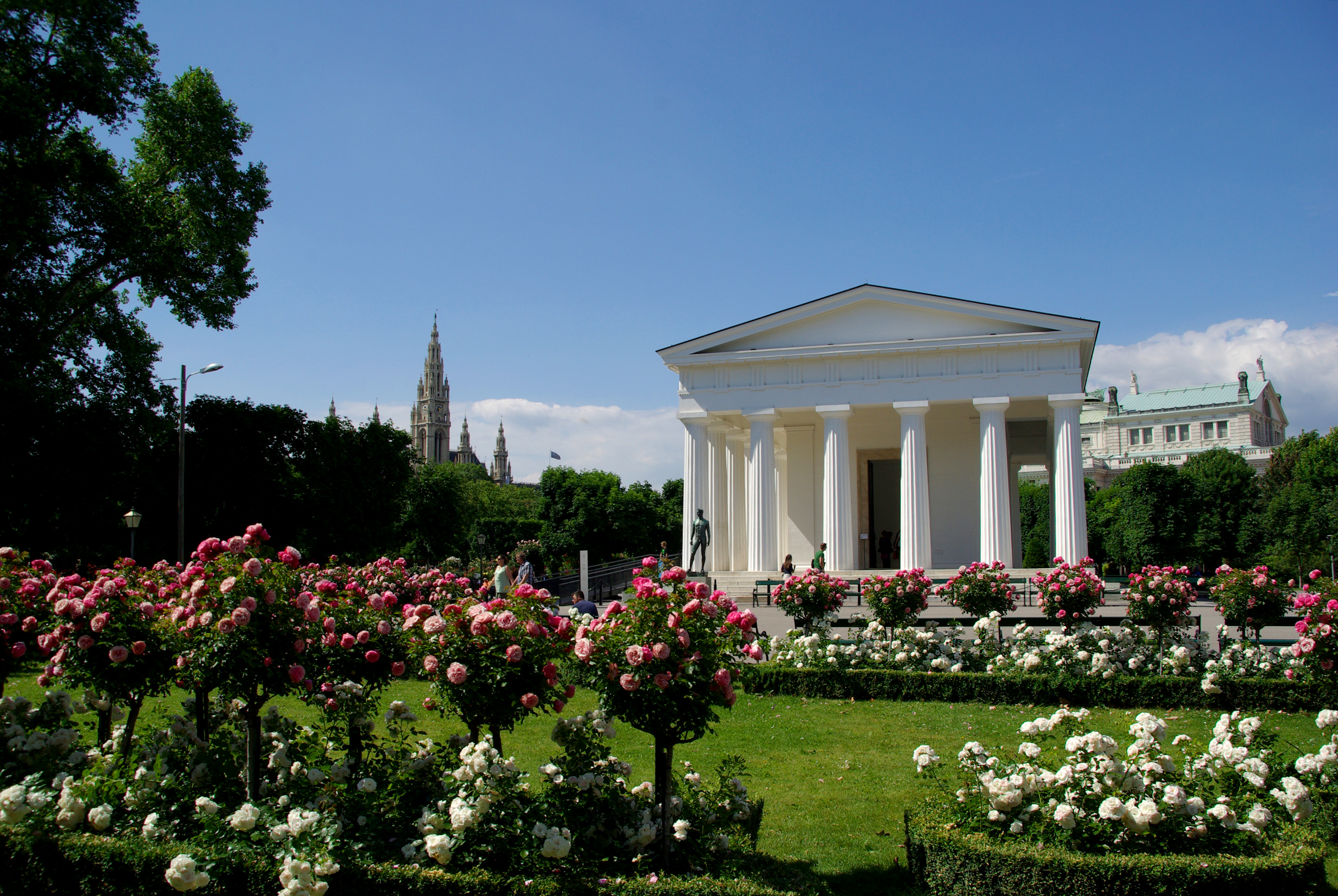
From the flower garden with the Rathaus in the background

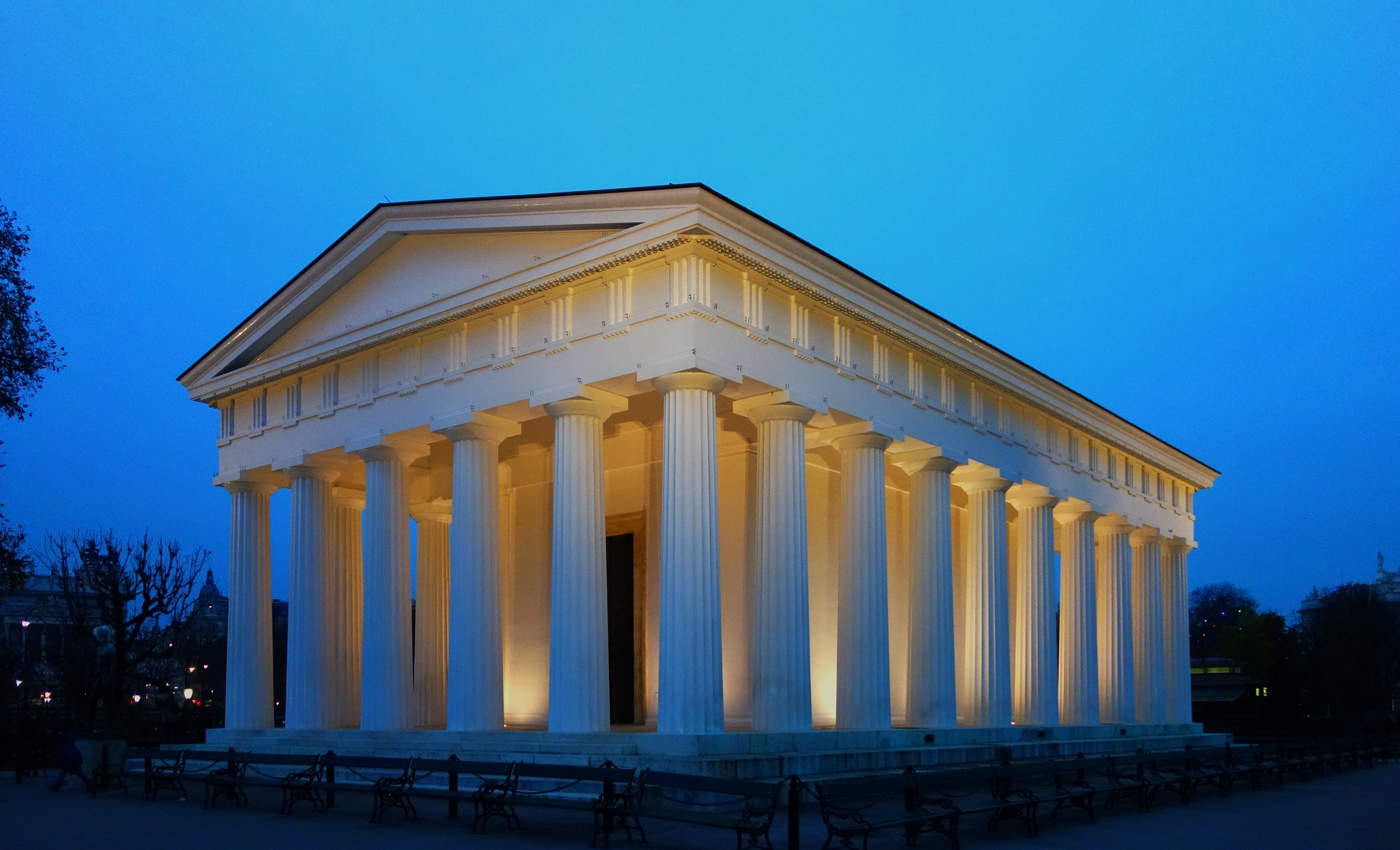
At dusk

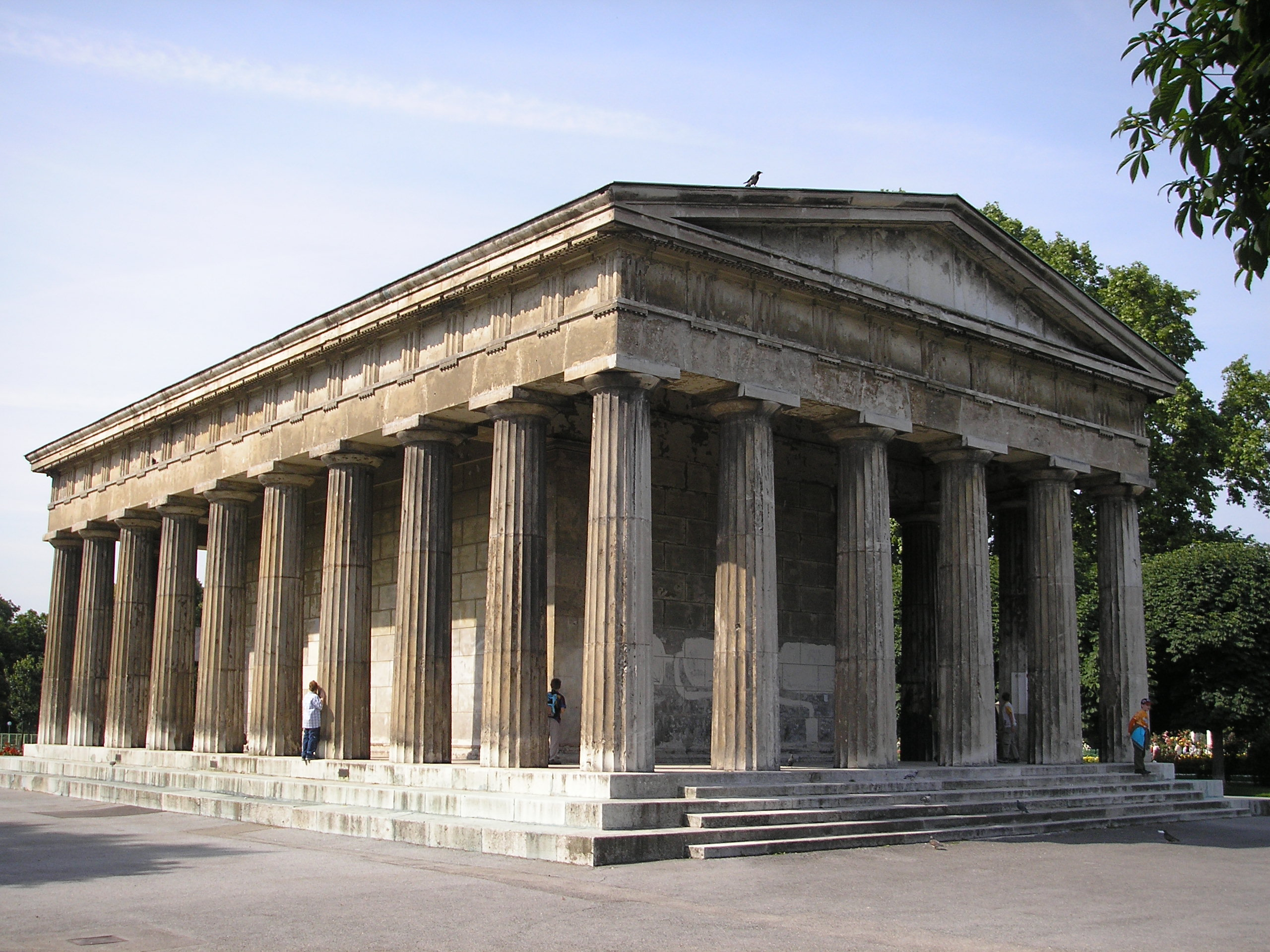
Pre-renovation

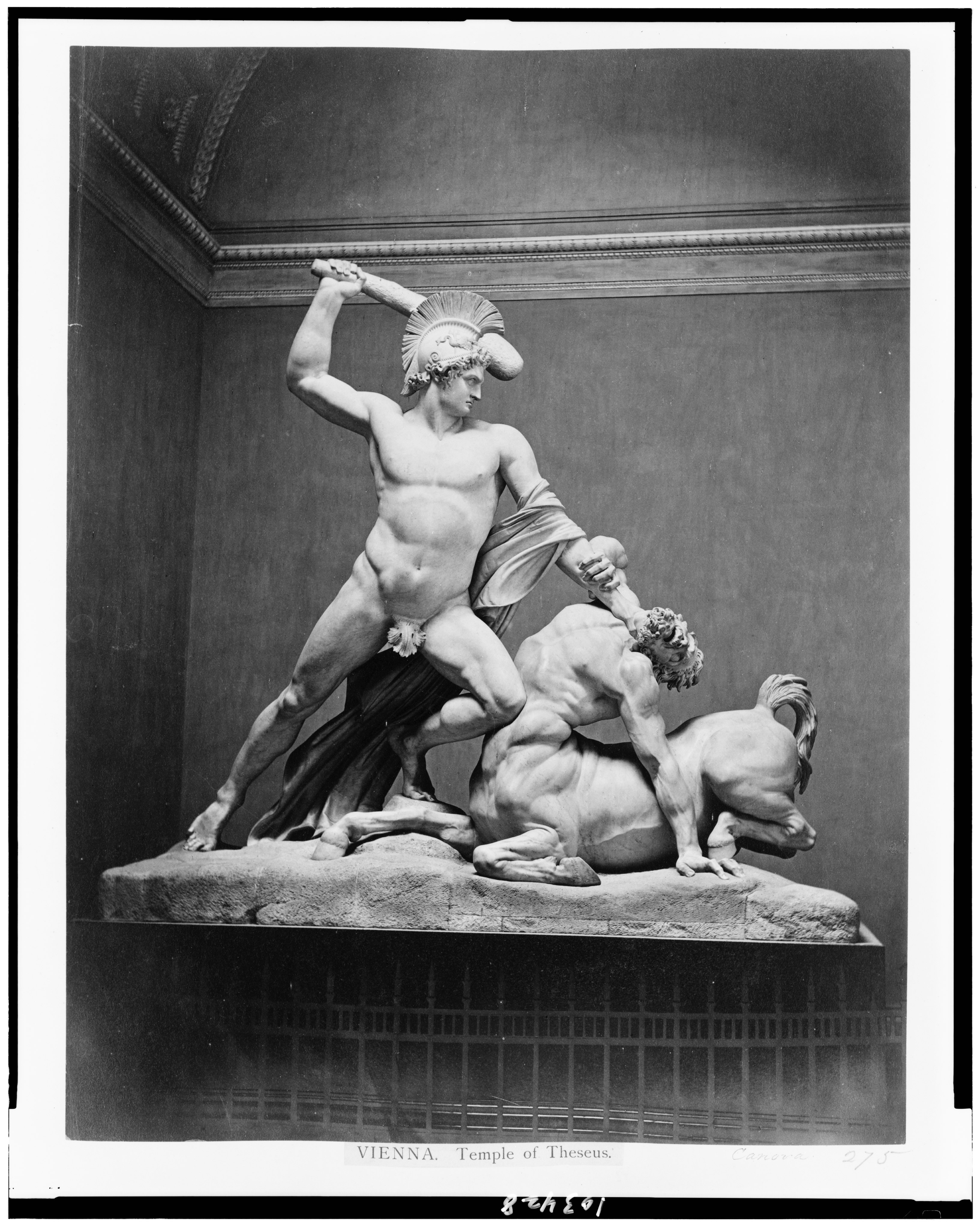
Theseusgruppe, now in the KHM

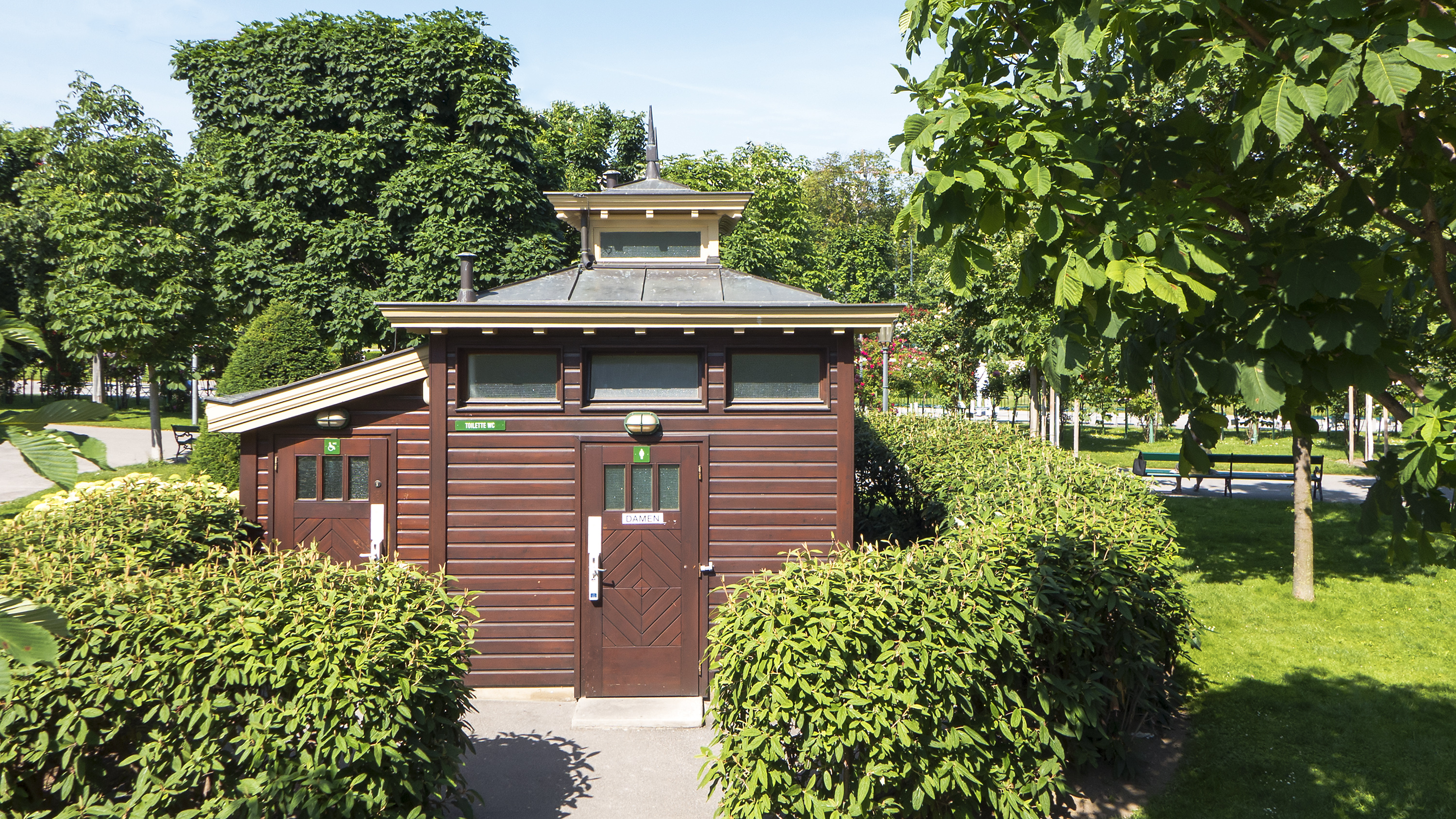
The public toilet

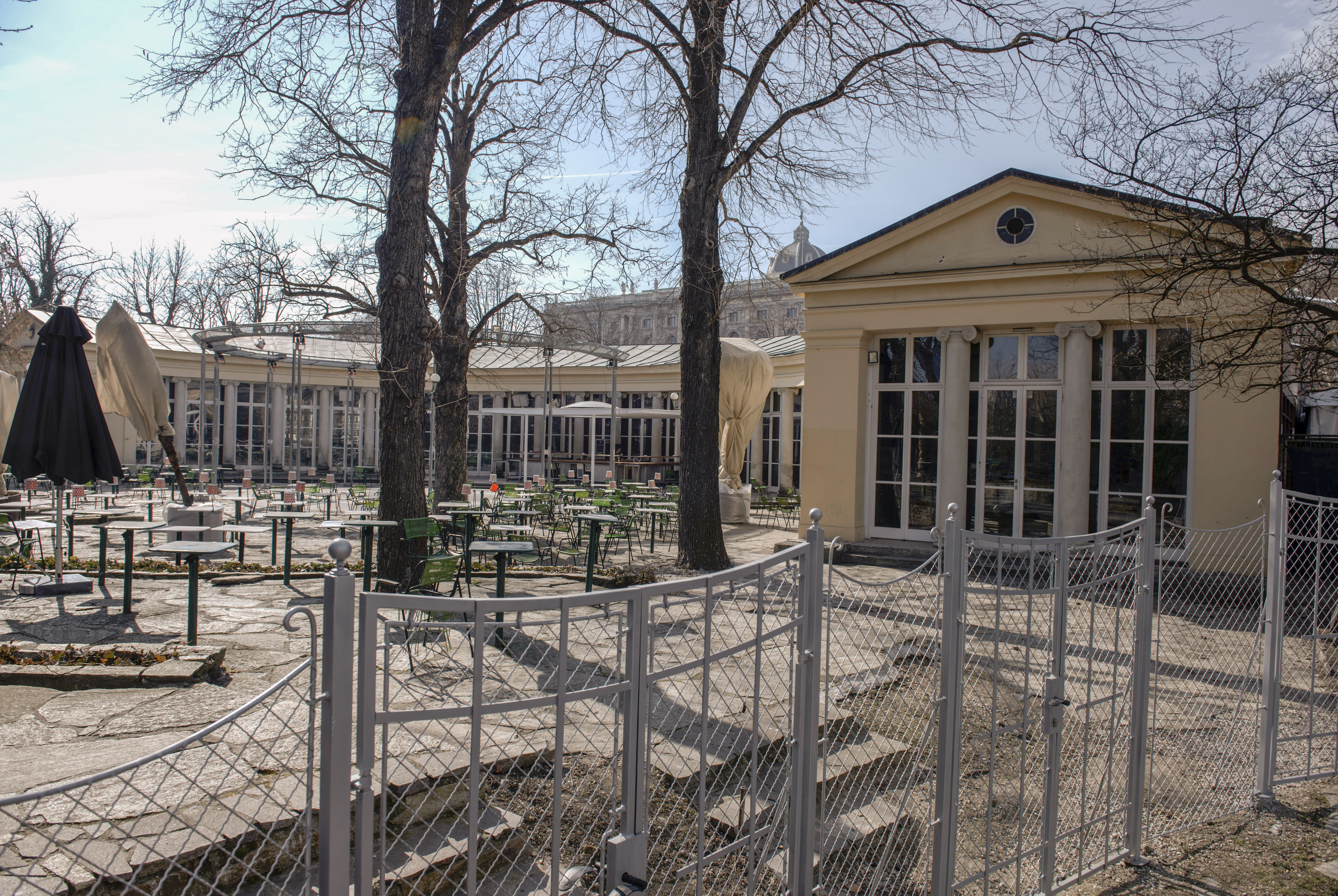
The exterior of the nightclub, formerly a coffee house

=== Statues ===
- Grillparzer monument: Erected in 1889 by Carl Kundmann, is a Lasa marble memorial dedicated to the Austrian dramatist Franz Grillparzer. It features depictions of his plays.
- Sisi memorial: Honours Empress Elisabeth (Sisi) and was unveiled in the presence of Emperor Franz Joseph, her widower. The statue overlooks a pond and a rose garden.
- Jugendlicher Athlet: A bronze sculpture of a young athlete from 1921, honouring Austria's athletes.
- Raab-Denkmal: Unveiled in 1967, it honors Julius Raab, the Austrian chancellor who played a key role in securing Austria's independence in 1955.
- Memorial for the Victims of Nazi Military Justice: An X-shaped monument dedicated to Austrian deserters and conscientious objectors who were executed by the Nazis.
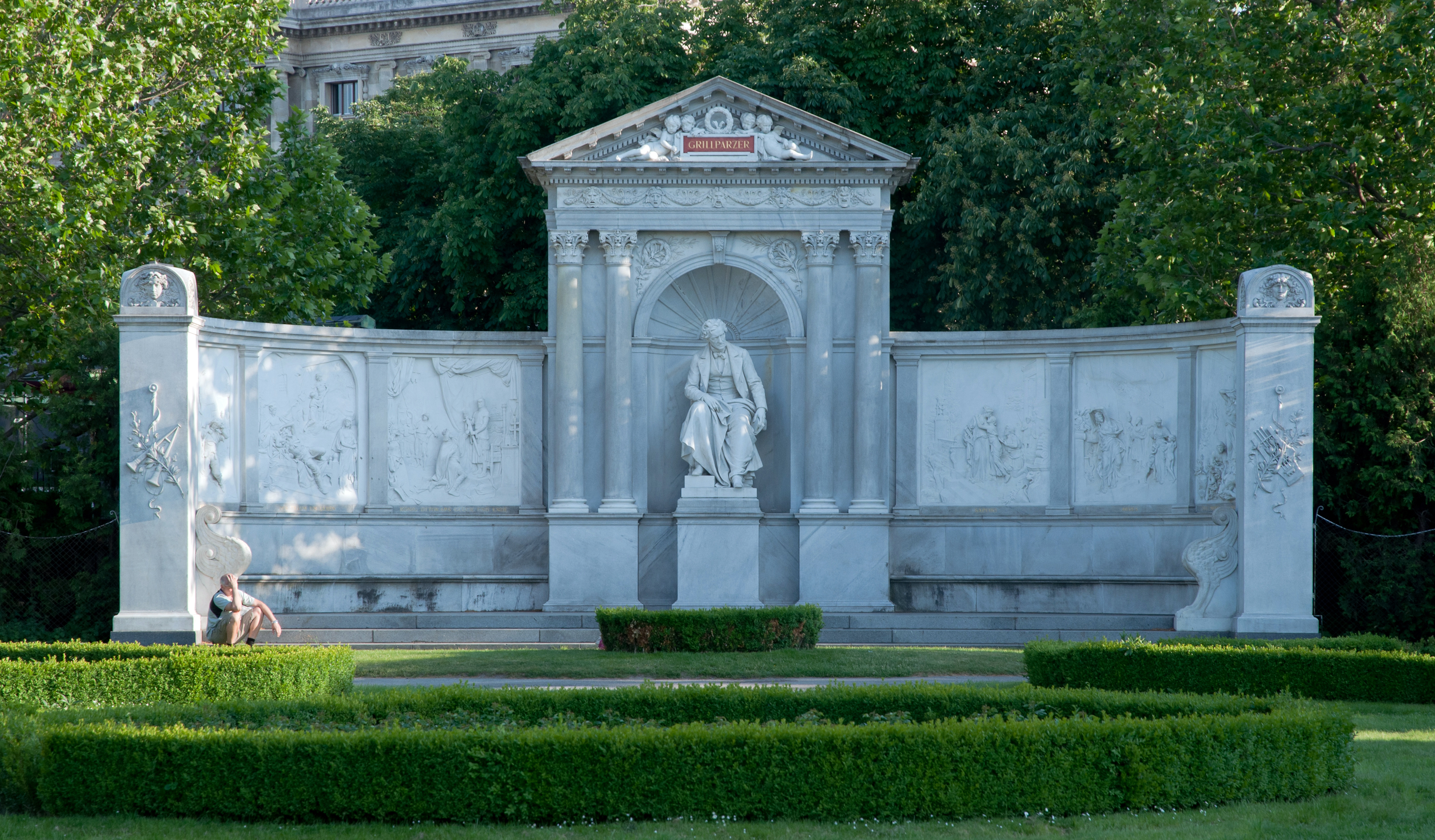
Franz Grillparzer

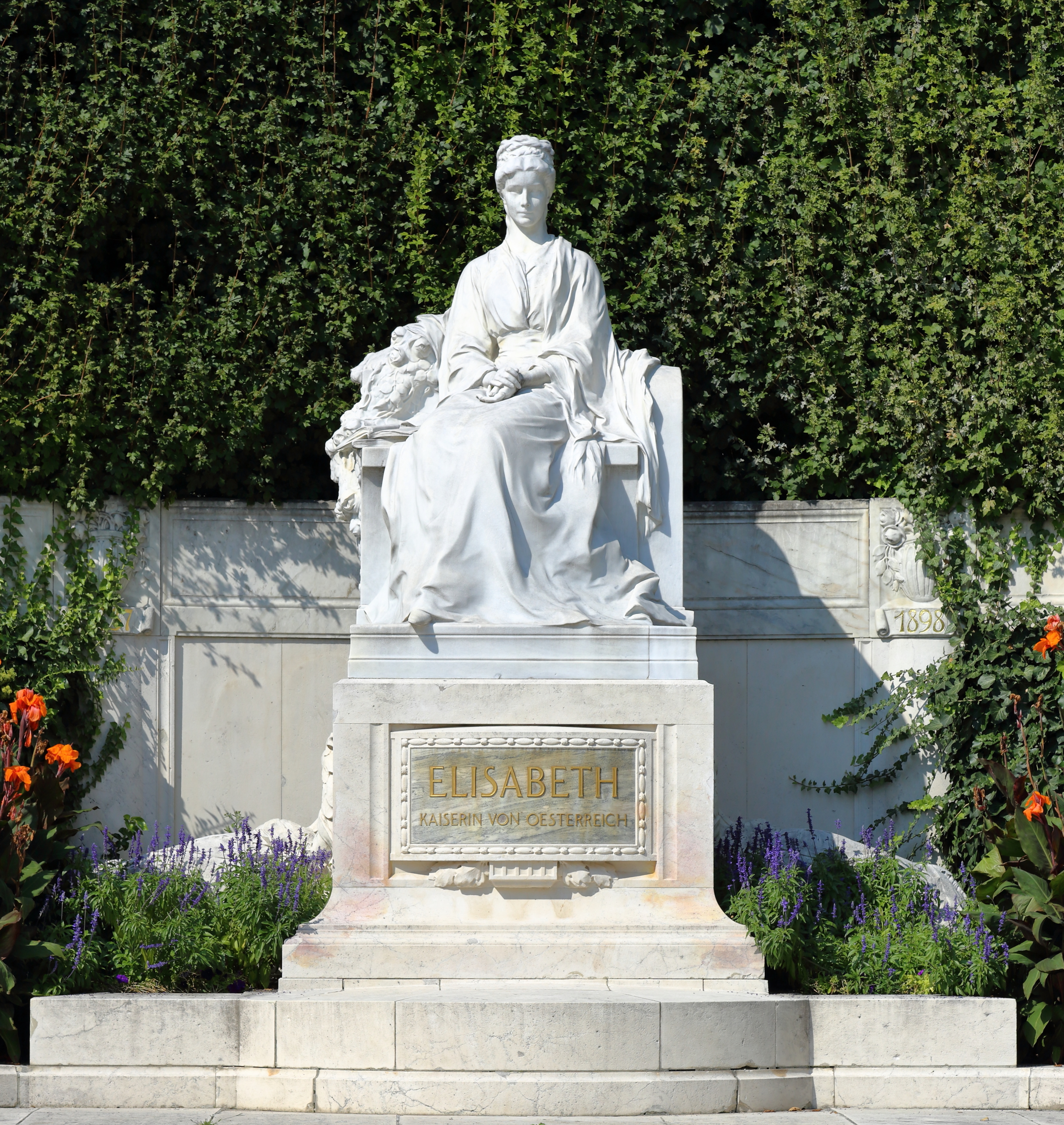
Empress Elisabeth (Sisi)

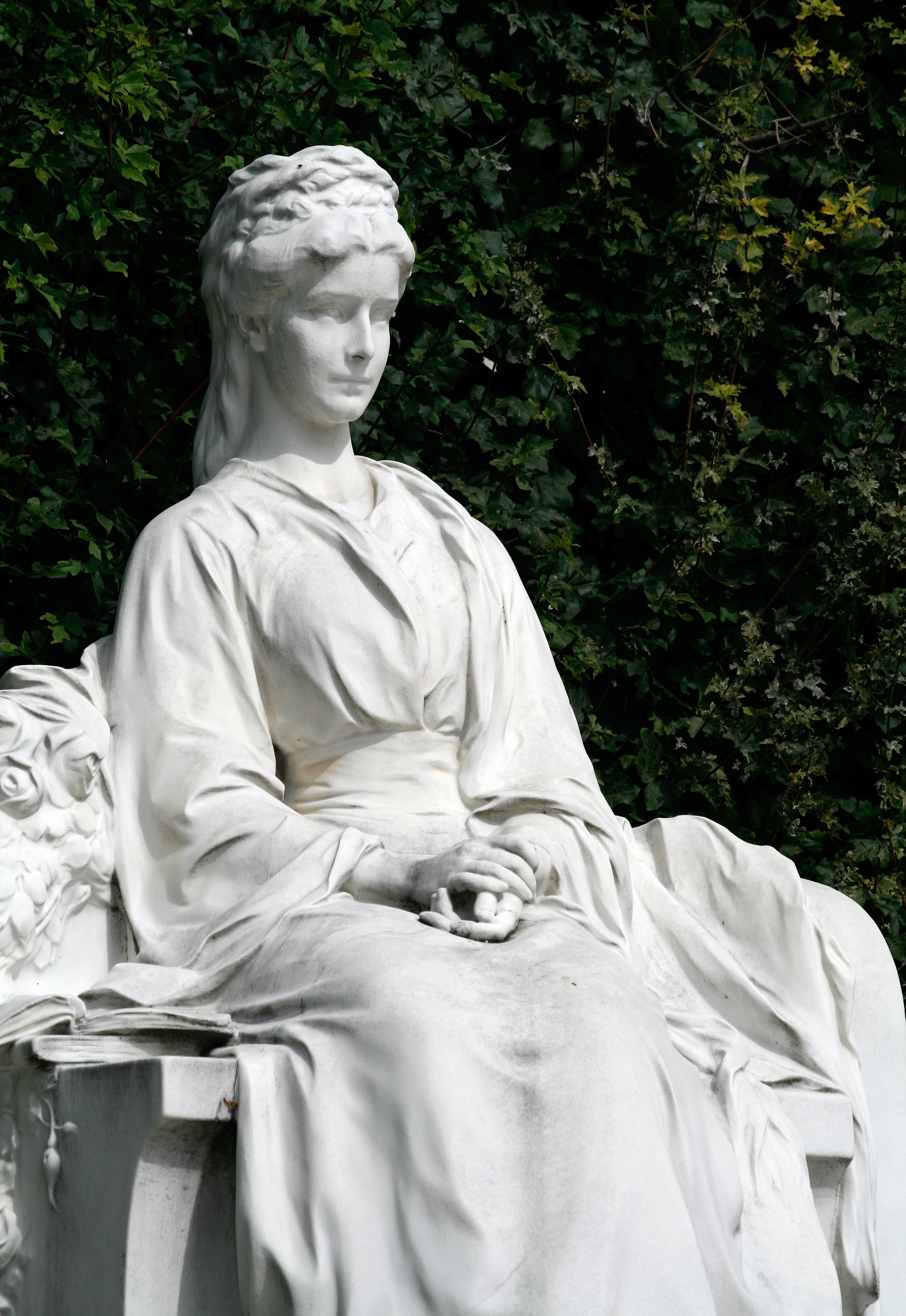
Sisi monument in detail

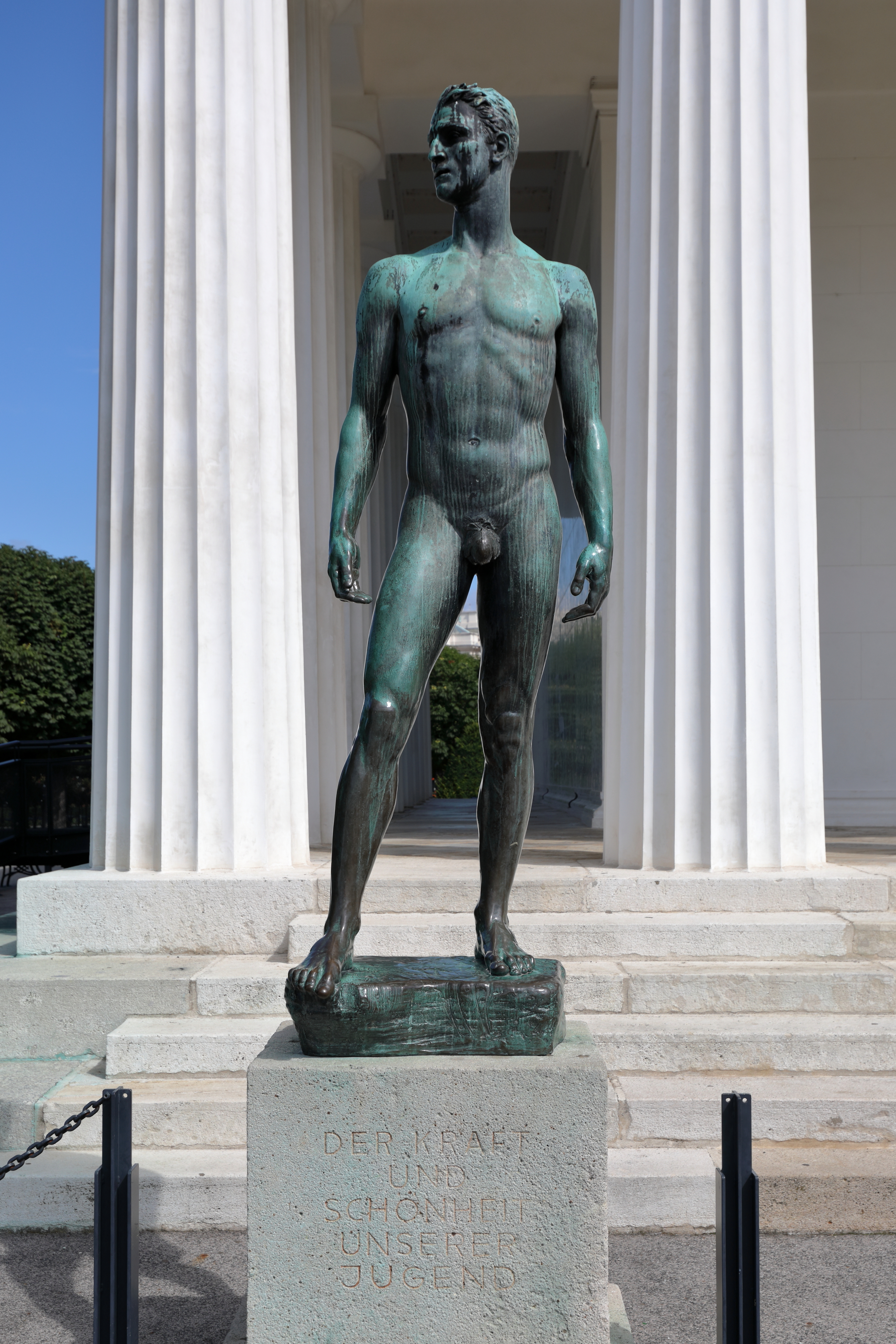
Young athlete in front of the temple

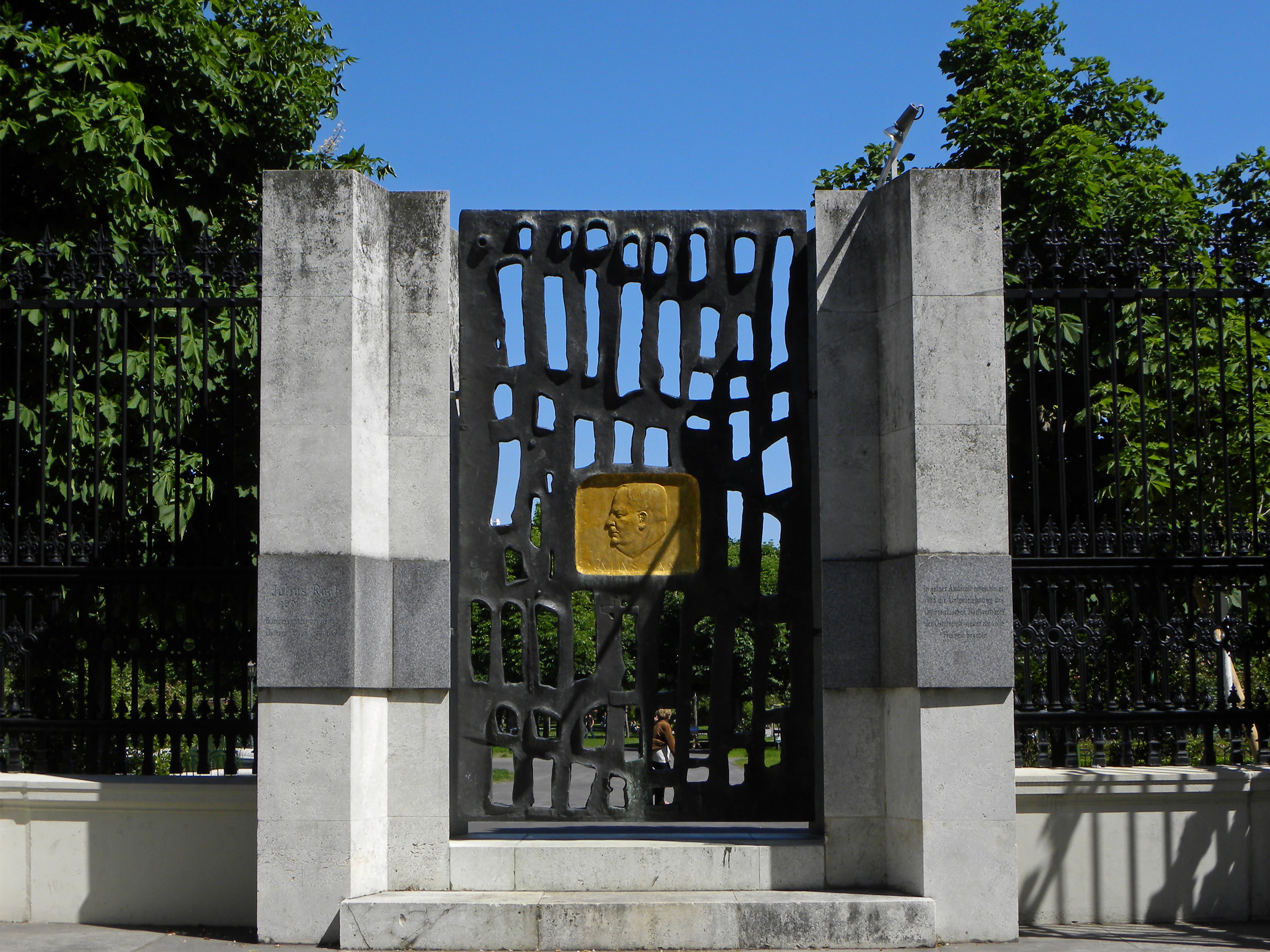
Julius Raab

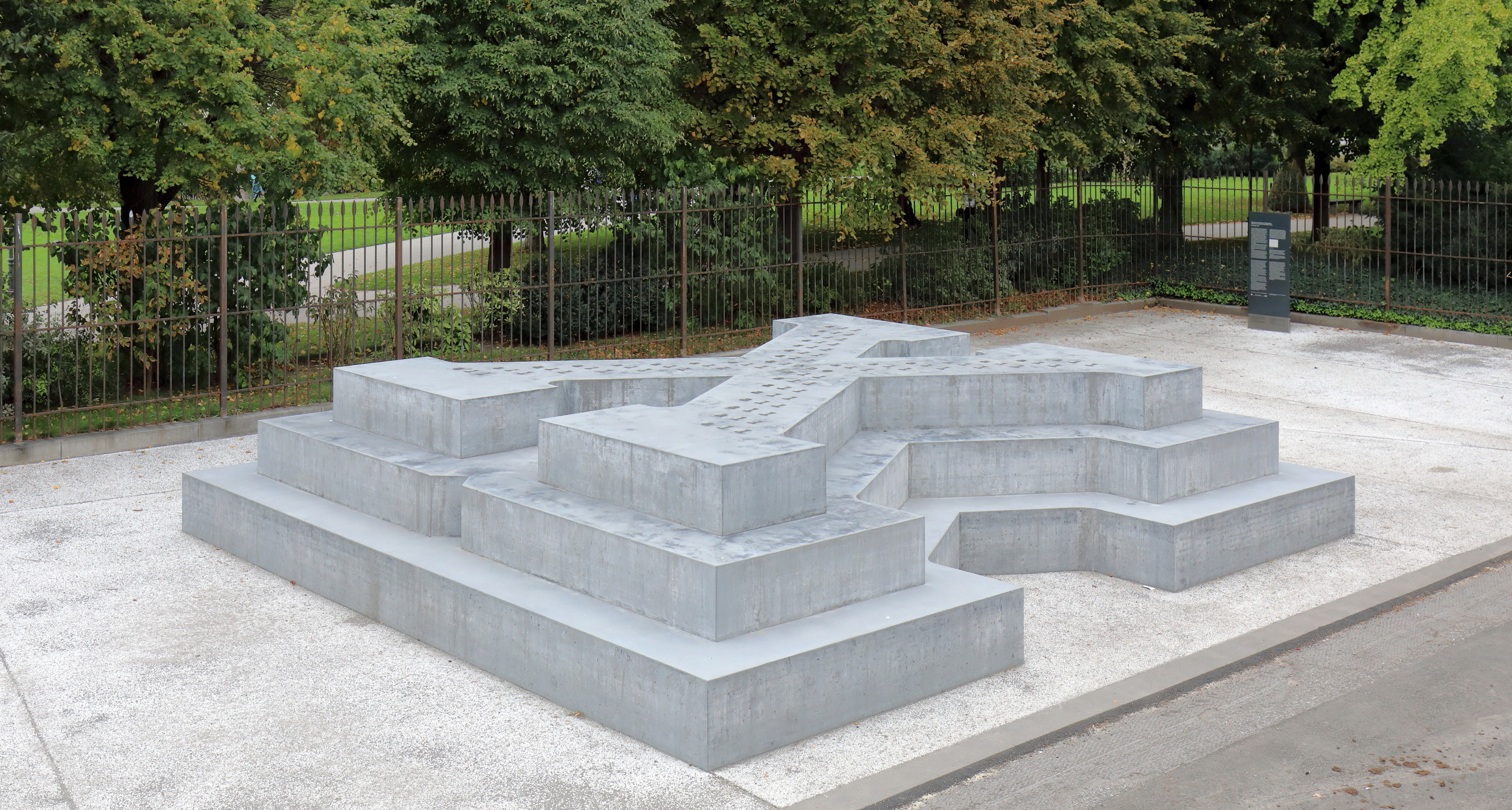
Memorial for the Victims of Nazi Military Justice

=== Fountains ===
- Volksgarten-Brunnen: Built in 1866, designed by Anton Dominik Fernkorn.
- Triton- und Nymphenbrunnen: Erected in 1880 by Viktor Oskar Tilgner, featuring Triton with a nymph, as well as a putto and a dolphin.
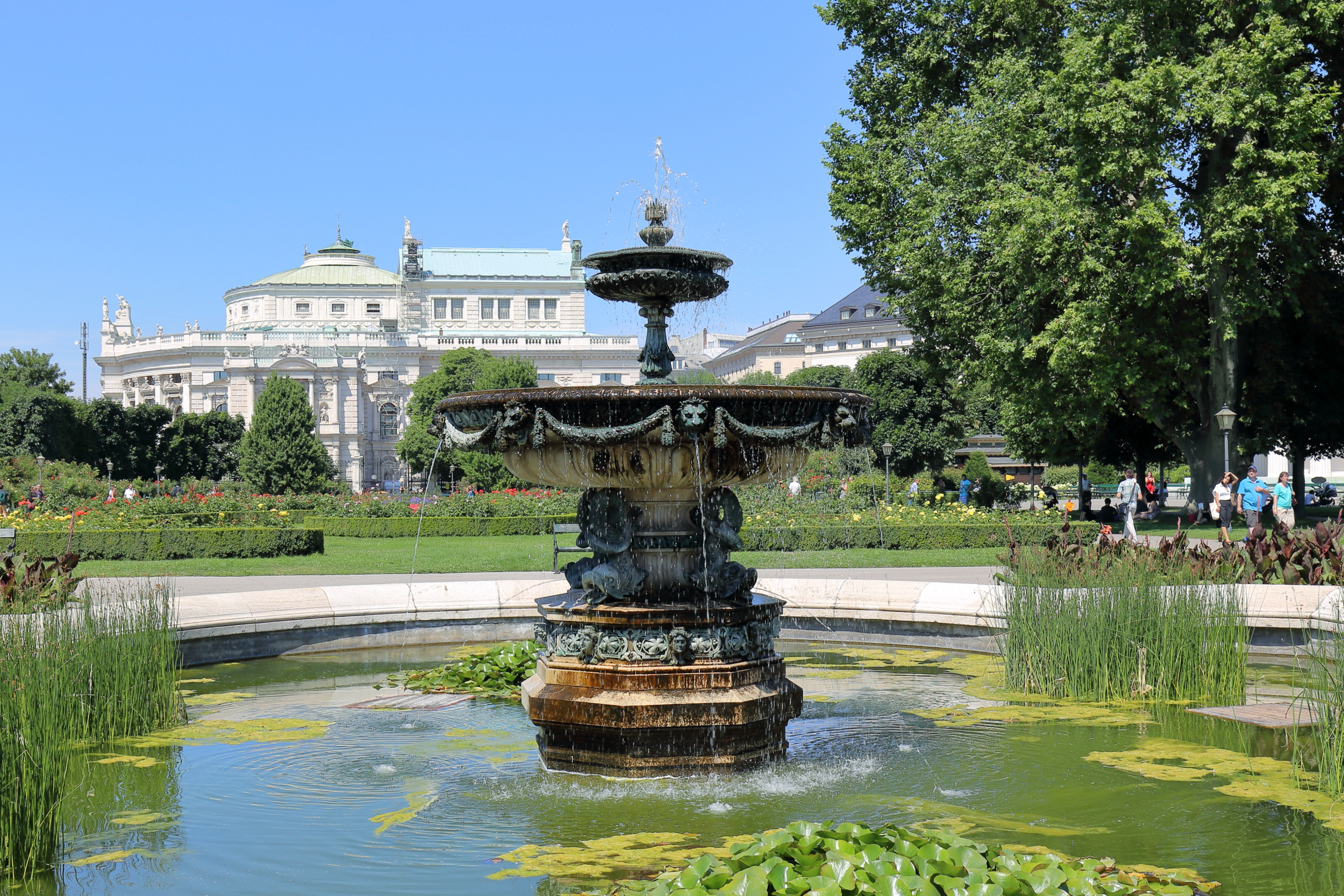
Volksgarten fountain

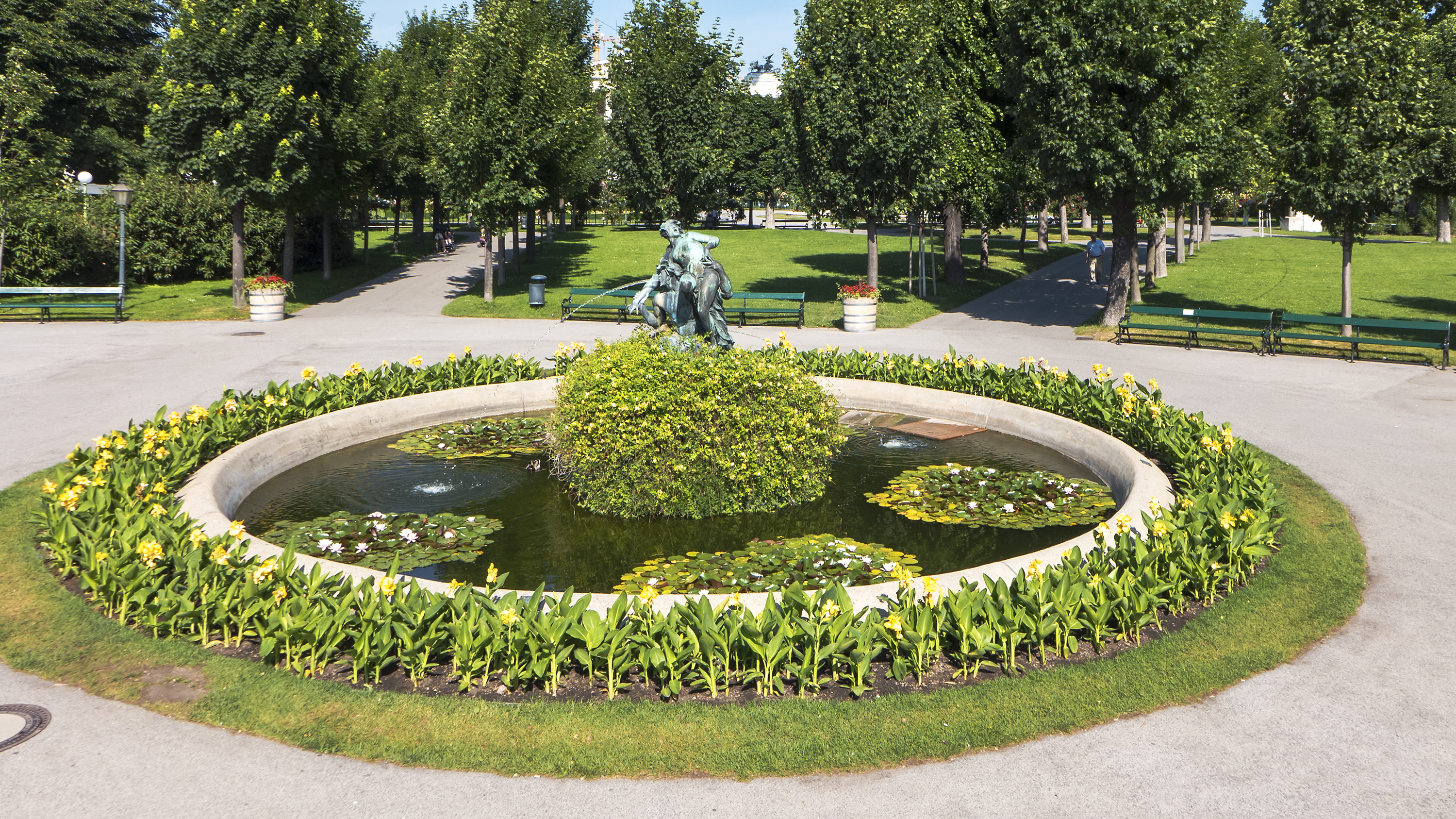
Triton and Nymph fountain

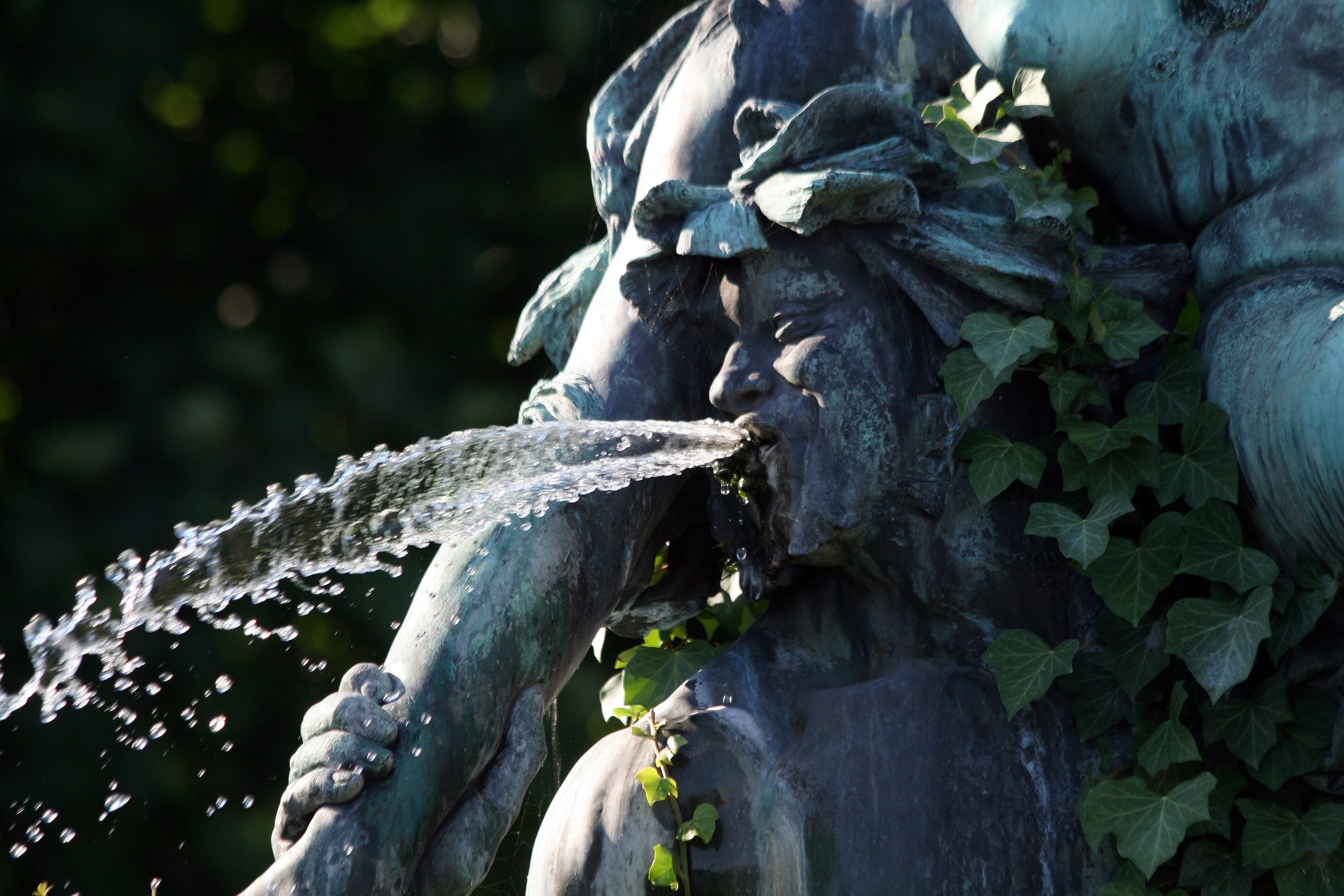
Closeup
