= List of ministers of justice (Austria) =

Minister of Justice
- Justizminister
- Coat of arms

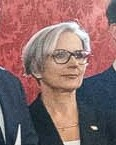
- Incumbent; Anna Sporrer since 3 March 2025
- Ministry of Justice
- Style: Mr. Federal minister (formal)
- Member of: Federal Government; Council of Ministers
- Nominator: Political parties
- Appointer: The president on advice of the chancellor
- Constituting instrument: Constitution of Austria
- First holder: Julius Rollerr; First Republic
- Website: Official website

The minister of justice of Austria (German: Justizminister) heads the Ministry of Justice.

== Ministers ==
=== First Republic ===
No.	Portrait	Name (Birth–Death)	Term of office			Political party	Government
No.	Portrait	Name (Birth–Death)	Took office	Left office (Note: Based on when the successor took office)	Time in office	Political party	Government
State Secretariat of Justice (Staatsamt für Justiz)
1	Julius Roller [de]	Julius Roller (1862–1946)	30 October 1918	15 March 1919	136 days	Independent	Renner I Cabinet
2	Richard Bratusch [de]	Richard Bratusch (1861–1949)	15 March 1919	17 October 1919	216 days	Independent	Renner II Cabinet
3	Rudolf Ramek	Rudolf Ramek (1881–1941)	17 October 1919	24 June 1920	251 days	CS	Renner III Cabinet
–	Matthias Eldersch	Matthias Eldersch (1869–1931); Acting	24 June 1920	7 July 1920	13 days	SDAPÖ	Renner III Cabinet
(1)	Julius Roller [de]	Julius Roller (1862–1946)	7 July 1920	20 November 1920	136 days	Independent	Mayr I Cabinet
Ministry of Justice (Bundesministerium für Justiz)
4	Rudolf Paltauf [de]	Rudolf Paltauf (1862–1936)	20 November 1920	31 May 1922	1 year, 192 days	Independent	Mayr II Cabinet; Schober I Cabinet; Breisky Cabinet; Schober II Cabinet
5	Leopold Waber	Leopold Waber (1875–1945)	31 May 1922	17 April 1923	321 days	GDVP	Seipel I Cabinet
–	Felix Frank	Felix Frank (1876–1957); Acting	17 April 1923	20 November 1924	1 year, 217 days	GDVP	Seipel II Cabinet–III
(5)	Leopold Waber	Leopold Waber (1875–1945)	20 November 1924	20 October 1926	1 year, 334 days	GDVP	Ramek I Cabinet–II
6	Franz Dinghofer	Franz Dinghofer (1873–1956)	20 October 1926	4 July 1928	1 year, 258 days	GDVP	Seipel IV Cabinet–V
–	Ignaz Seipel	Ignaz Seipel (1876–1932); Acting	4 July 1928	6 July 1928	2 days	CS	Seipel V Cabinet
7	Franz Slama [de]	Franz Slama (1885–1938)	6 July 1928	30 September 1930	2 years, 86 days	GDVP	Seipel V Cabinet; Streeruwitz Cabinet; Schober III Cabinet
8	Franz Hueber [de]	Franz Hueber (1894–1981)	30 September 1930	4 December 1930	65 days	Heimatblock	Vaugoin Cabinet
9	Hans Schürff [de]	Hans Schürff (1875–1939)	4 December 1930	30 May 1931	177 days	GDVP	Ender Cabinet
–	Johann Schober	Johann Schober (1874–1932); Acting	30 May 1931	20 June 1931	21 days	Independent	Ender Cabinet
(9)	Hans Schürff [de]	Hans Schürff (1875–1939)	20 June 1931	29 January 1932	223 days	GDVP	Buresch I Cabinet
10	Kurt Schuschnigg	Kurt Schuschnigg (1897–1977)	29 January 1932	10 July 1934	2 years, 162 days	GDVP; VF	Buresch II Cabinet; Dollfuss I Cabinet–II
11	Egon Berger-Waldenegg [de]	Egon Berger-Waldenegg (1880–1960)	10 July 1934	17 October 1935	1 year, 99 days	Heimatblock	Dollfuss II Cabinet; Schuschnigg I Cabinet
12	Robert Winterstein [de]	Robert Winterstein (1874–1940)	17 October 1935	14 May 1936	210 days	VF	Schuschnigg I Cabinet
13	Hans Hammerstein-Equord [de]	Hans Hammerstein-Equord (1881–1947)	14 May 1936	3 November 1936	173 days	VF	Schuschnigg II Cabinet
14	Adolf Pilz [de]	Adolf Pilz (1877–1947)	3 November 1936	16 February 1938	1 year, 105 days	VF	Schuschnigg III Cabinet
15	Ludwig Adamovich [de]	Ludwig Adamovich (1890–1955)	16 February 1938	11 March 1938	23 days	VF	Schuschnigg IV Cabinet
(8)	Franz Hueber [de]	Franz Hueber (1894–1981)	11 March 1938	13 March 1938	2 days	NSDAP	Seyss-Inquart Cabinet

=== Second Republic ===
No.	Portrait	Name (Born-Died)	Term			Political Party	Government
No.	Portrait	Name (Born-Died)	Took office	Left office	Duration	Political Party	Government
State Secretariat of Justice (Staatsamt für Justiz)
1	Josef Gerö [de]	Josef Gerö (1896–1954)	27 April 1945	20 December 1945	237 days	Independent	Renner IV Cabinet
Minister of Justice (Bundesminister für Justiz)
1	Josef Gerö [de]	Josef Gerö (1896–1954)	20 December 1945	8 November 1949	3 years, 323 days	Independent	Figl I Cabinet
2	Otto Tschadek [de]	Otto Tschadek (1904–1969)	8 November 1949	16 September 1952	2 years, 313 days	SPÖ	Figl II Cabinet
(1)	Josef Gerö [de]	Josef Gerö (1896–1954)	16 September 1952	30 December 1954	2 years, 105 days	Independent	Figl II Cabinet–II; Raab I Cabinet
3	Adolf Schärf	Adolf Schärf (1890–1965)	30 December 1954	17 January 1955	18 days	SPÖ	Raab I Cabinet
4	Hans Kapfer [de]	Hans Kapfer (1903–1992)	17 January 1955	29 June 1956	1 year, 164 days	Independent	Raab I Cabinet
(2)	Otto Tschadek [de]	Otto Tschadek (1904–1969)	29 June 1956	23 June 1960	3 years, 360 days	SPÖ	Raab II Cabinet–II
5	Christian Broda	Christian Broda (1916–1987)	23 June 1960	19 April 1966	5 years, 300 days	SPÖ	Raab III Cabinet–II; Gorbach I Cabinet–II; Klaus I Cabinet
6	Hans Klecatsky [de]	Hans Klecatsky (1916–1987)	19 April 1966	21 April 1970	4 years, 2 days	Independent	Klaus II Cabinet
(5)	Christian Broda	Christian Broda (1916–1987)	21 April 1970	24 May 1983	13 years, 33 days	SPÖ	Kreisky I Cabinet–II–III–IV
7	Harald Ofner	Harald Ofner (1932–2026)	24 May 1983	21 January 1987	3 years, 242 days	FPÖ	Sinowatz Cabinet; Vranitzky I Cabinet
8	Egmont Foregger	Egmont Foregger (1922–2007)	21 January 1987	17 December 1990	3 years, 330 days	Independent	Vranitzky II Cabinet
9	Nikolaus Michalek [de]	Nikolaus Michalek (born 1940)	17 December 1990	4 February 2000	9 years, 49 days	Independent	Vranitzky III Cabinet–II–III; Klima Cabinet
10	Michael Krüger [de]	Michael Krüger (born 1955)	4 February 2000	29 February 2000	25 days	FPÖ	Schüssel I Cabinet
11	Dieter Böhmdorfer [de]	Dieter Böhmdorfer (born 1943)	2 March 2000	25 June 2004	4 years, 115 days	Independent	Schüssel I Cabinet–II
12	Karin Gastinger	Karin Gastinger (born 1964)	25 June 2004	11 January 2007	2 years, 200 days	BZÖ	Schüssel II Cabinet
13	Maria Berger	Maria Berger (born 1956)	11 January 2007	2 December 2008	1 year, 326 days	SPÖ	Gusenbauer Cabinet
–	Johannes Hahn	Johannes Hahn (born 1957); Acting	2 December 2008	15 January 2009	44 days	ÖVP	Faymann I Cabinet
14	Claudia Bandion-Ortner	Claudia Bandion-Ortner (born 1966)	15 January 2009	21 April 2011	2 years, 96 days	Independent	Faymann I Cabinet
15	Beatrix Karl	Beatrix Karl (born 1967)	21 April 2011	16 December 2013	2 years, 239 days	ÖVP	Faymann I Cabinet
16	Wolfgang Brandstetter	Wolfgang Brandstetter (born 1957)	16 December 2013	18 December 2017	4 years, 2 days	Independent	Faymann II Cabinet; Kern Cabinet
17	Josef Moser	Josef Moser (born 1955)	18 December 2017	8 January 2018	21 days	Independent	Kurz I Cabinet
Minister of Constitutional Affairs, Reform, Deregulation, and Justice (Bundesminister für Verfassung, Reformen, Deregulierung und Justiz)
17	Josef Moser	Josef Moser (born 1955)	8 January 2018	3 June 2019	1 year, 146 days	Independent	Kurz I Cabinet
18	Clemens Jabloner	Clemens Jabloner (born 1948)	3 June 2019	7 January 2020	218 days	Independent	Bierlein Cabinet
19	Alma Zadić	Alma Zadić (born 1984)	7 January 2020	29 January 2020	22 days	Greens	Kurz II Cabinet
Minister of Justice (Bundesminister für Justiz)
19	Alma Zadić	Alma Zadić (born 1984)	29 January 2020	3 March 2025	5 years, 33 days	Greens	Kurz II Cabinet–II–III
20	Anna Sporrer	Anna Sporrer (born 1962)	3 March 2025	Incumbent	1 year, 188 days	SPÖ	Stocker Cabinet

== See also ==
- Ministry of Justice (Austria)
