= Alma Zadić =

Austrian lawyer and politician (born 1984)

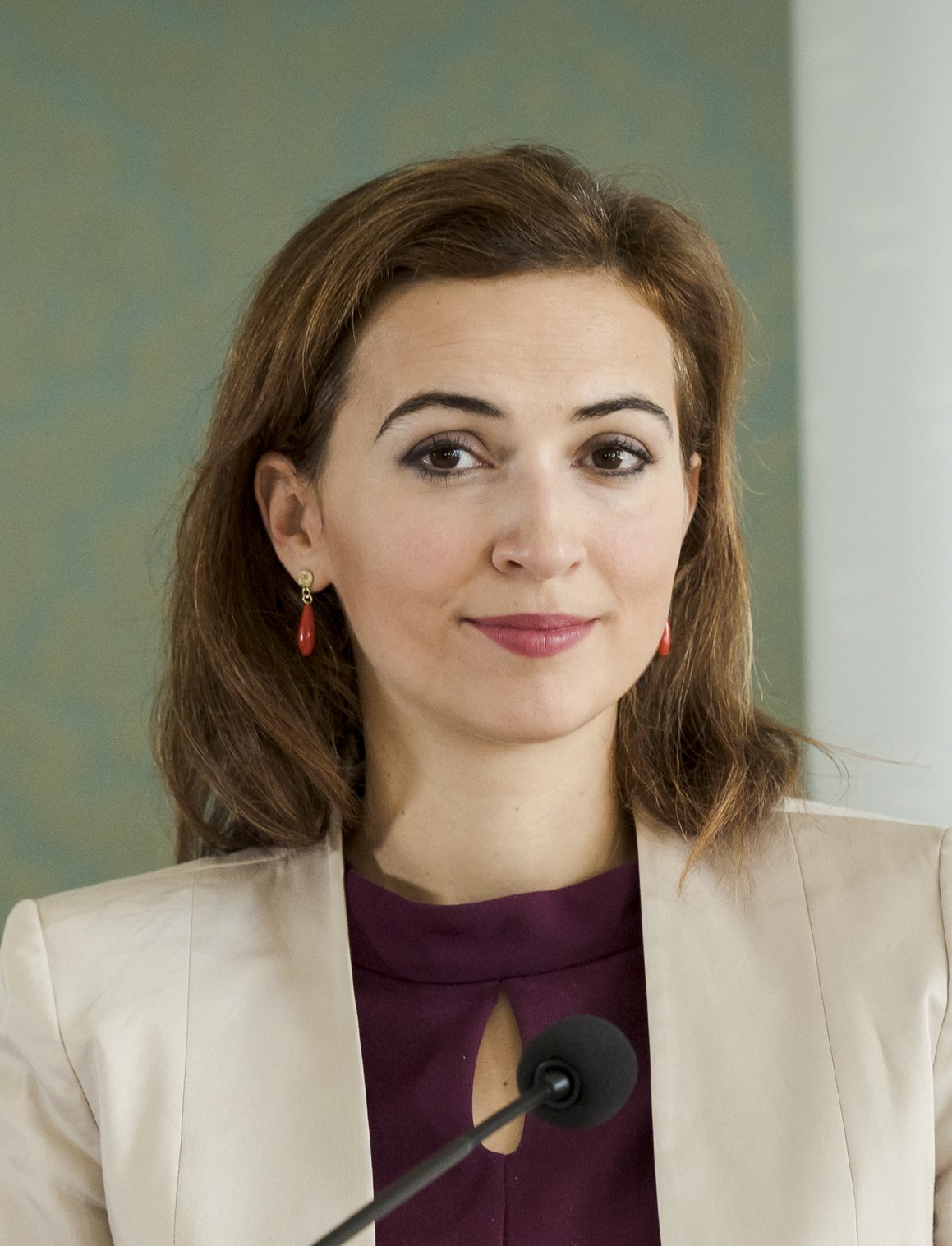
- Zadić in 2020

Minister of Justice
- In office 7 January 2020 – 3 March 2025
- Chancellor: Sebastian Kurz; Alexander Schallenberg; Karl Nehammer
- Preceded by: Clemens Jabloner
- Succeeded by: Anna Sporrer

Member of the National Council
- Incumbent
- Assumed office 24 October 2024
- Constituency: 9 – Vienna
- In office 9 November 2017 – 7 January 2020
- Constituency: 9 – Vienna

Personal details
- Born: Alma Zadić; 24 May 1984 (age 42) Tuzla, SR Bosnia and Herzegovina, SFR Yugoslavia
- Party: The Greens (since 2019)
- Other political affiliations: JETZT (2017–2019)
- Children: 2
- Education: University of Vienna (Mag. iur., LLD); Columbia University (LLM)

Alma Zadić (German: [ˈalma 'zaditʃ]; born 24 May 1984) is a Bosnian-born Austrian lawyer and politician of The Greens. She served as Minister of Justice from 7 January 2020 until 3 March 2025 in the cabinets of Chancellors Sebastian Kurz, Alexander Schallenberg and Karl Nehammer.

Previously she was a member of the National Council since 2017, originally as a member of JETZT, later switching to The Greens in 2019.

== Early life and education ==
Zadić was born in Tuzla, SR Bosnia and Herzegovina, where she began her elementary education. Her father was an electrical engineering professor at the University of Tuzla, and her mother served as a municipal instruction inspector. In 1994, to escape the Bosnian War, her family relocated to Austria and settled in Vienna, where she graduated from the Ettenreichgasse gymnasium.

Zadić pursued a law degree at the University of Vienna, graduating in 2007. During her studies, she spent a term abroad at the Università Cattolica del Sacro Cuore in Milan. She was a competitive volleyball player and fitness coach, while also working as a junior legal researcher at the International Organization for Migration (IOM) in Vienna and later as an intern at the International Criminal Tribunal for the former Yugoslavia (ICTY) in The Hague.

She earned a Fulbright scholarship to attend Columbia University in New York City, where she received a Master of Laws (LL.M.) in 2009 and served as Director of the Vale Columbia Center on Sustainable International Investment. She later completed her doctorate of law (Dr. iur.) at the University of Vienna in 2017.

Before entering politics, Zadić spent six years as a senior associate at the Vienna office of the global law firm Freshfields Bruckhaus Deringer, specializing in international human rights issues.

== Political career ==
In 2017 she joined the Pilz list, from 2018 the JETZT list and was elected to the National Council in the 2017 parliamentary elections. In 2019 she briefly became a non-party member of the National Council before being elected as a member of The Greens in that year's election.

On 7 January 2020, Zadić, along with three other Greens, was sworn in by Austria's president Alexander Van der Bellen to serve in the Sebastian Kurz coalition government as Minister of Justice pursuant to the coalition agreement of Kurz's ÖVP with the Greens, led by Werner Kogler, who served as Vice Chancellor.

Zadić remained in the same role when Alexander Schallenberg set up a new government following Kurz's resignation in October 2021. She continued serving until 2025, when the government of Christian Stocker was sworn in.

== Defamation case ==
On social media, Zadić shared a photograph in which a member of a Burschenschaft was seen giving a Nazi salute, with the comment "No tolerance for neo-Nazis, fascists and racists". In November 2019, she was found guilty of defamation and fined €700 by a criminal court in Vienna.

== Personal life ==
Zadić has been described as a Muslim, but denies any religious affiliation. She is married and has two sons.
