= ÖJV =

ÖJV could refer to:

- Austrian Judo Federation (German: Österreichischer Judoverband)
- Österreichisches Jungvolk (Austrian Young People)
