= Rudolf Ramek =

Austrian politician (1881–1941)

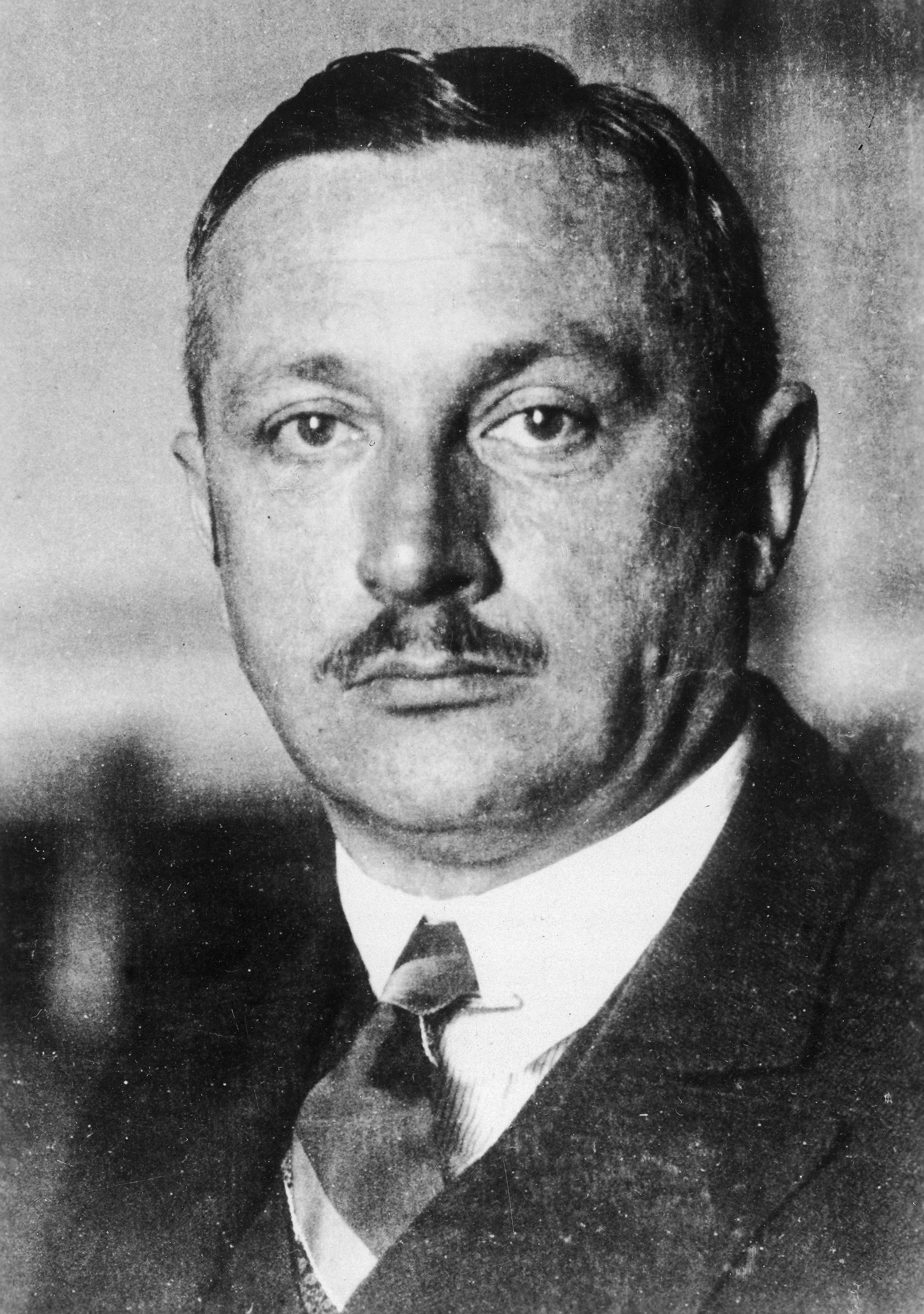
- Rudolf Ramek c. 1929–1931

Chancellor of Austria
- In office 20 November 1924 – 20 October 1926
- President: Michael Hainisch
- Vice-Chancellor: Leopold Waber
- Preceded by: Ignaz Seipel
- Succeeded by: Ignaz Seipel

Second President of the National Council
- In office 4 October 1930 – 4 March 1933
- Preceded by: Matthias Eldersch
- Succeeded by: Johann Böhm (1945)
Other offices held
Minister of Foreign Affairs
In office 15 January 1926 – 20 October 1926
Preceded by	Heinrich Mataja
Succeeded by	Ignaz Seipel
Minister of the Interior
In office 23 April 1921 – 21 June 1921
Preceded by	Ignaz Seipel
Succeeded by	Ignaz Seipel
Minister of Education
In office 23 April 1921 – 21 June 1921
Preceded by	Egon Glanz
Succeeded by	Leopold Waber
Minister of Justice
In office 17 October 1919 – 24 June 1920
Preceded by	Richard Bratusch
Succeeded by	Matthias Eldersch

Personal details
- Born: 12 April 1881 Teschen, Austria-Hungary
- Died: 24 July 1941 (aged 60) Vienna, Nazi Germany
- Resting place: Municipal Cemetery in Salzburg
- Party: Christian Social Party

Rudolf Ramek (12 April 1881 – 24 July 1941) was an Austrian Christian Social politician, who served as Chancellor of Austria from 1924 to 1926.

== Life ==
Ramek was born in Teschen in Austrian Silesia (present-day Cieszyn, Poland). A member of the Christian Social Party, he was a delegate of the Austrian Constitutional Assembly in 1919 and served as State Secretary of Justice in the rank of minister in State Chancellor Karl Renner's cabinet until 24 June 1920. A member of the National Council after the 1920 legislative election, he succeeded his party fellow Ignaz Seipel as Austrian chancellor on 20 November 1924.

Under Ramek's government, the Schilling became the official Austrian currency in 1925, after a hyperinflation period of the old Austrian krone in the early 1920s. The supervision of the country's finances by a League of Nations Commissioner finished the next year, however, the depression continued and unemployment figures were rising. Ramek finally resigned during the crisis around the state-owned Österreichische Postsparkasse postal savings bank on 20 October 1926, again succeeded by Ignaz Seipel.

Upon the 1930 legislative election, Ramek became vice president of the National Council parliament. Together with the other members of the chairmanship, Karl Renner and Sepp Straffner, he resigned on 4 March 1933 after a quarrel over voting irregularities, giving Chancellor Engelbert Dollfuss the opportunity to prevent any further meetings of the legislature. After the Social Democratic February Uprising of 1934 was crushed, Ramek on 30 April reconvened the assembly, only to adopt the imposed May Constitution of the Federal State of Austria, whereby the National Council was abolished.

Ramek died in Vienna and was buried in the Salzburg Municipal Cemetery.

Political offices
Preceded by Ignaz Seipel	Chancellor of Austria; 1924-1926	Succeeded by Ignaz Seipel
