= Egmont Foregger =

Austrian jurist, official and politician

Egmont Foregger (21 September 1922, Salzburg, Austria – 17 May 2007, Bruck an der Mur, Austria) was an Austrian jurist, official and politician.

== Life ==
Foregger came from the old Austrian family of Foregger Ritter von Greiffenthurn. He was a graduate of the Academic Gymnasium in Salzburg, and then worked as an official in the Ministry of Justice, in particular in criminal legislature. From 1974 onwards, he also directed the criminal legislature. Foregger - the first and only, as of 2013, under the Criminal Justice Ministers of the Second Republic - was instrumental in the large Christian Broda-involved penal reform in 1975.

Foregger has written numerous publications on criminal law. He is one of the authors of the new edition of the "Viennese Commentary on the Criminal Code".

Foregger died in 2007 after a bout of severe illness.

== Politics ==
Foregger was, from January 1987 to December 1990, an independent minister. Under the cabinet of Franz Vranitzky, Foregger was the Federal Minister of Justice. During his tenure, he judged over politically sensitive process, as such in the Lucona case and the Noricum Scandal, but other explosive events accompanied his tenure such as the murder of Kurdish political leader Abdul Rahman Ghassemlou and the scandals facing Fred Sinowatz and Hannes Androsch. The fact that many of his proceedings were particularly against leading Social Democratic Party of Austria (SPÖ) members (which was the leading party at the time) had not allowed Foregger to adjust his ministerial referral like his predecessors Harald Ofner and Christian Broda repeatedly so. This earned him public respect, but also meant that the SPÖ-led government formed a veto against a further term of Foregger after the National Council elections in 1990.

During his tenure as justice minister, Foregger put in a renewed juvenile offence system, as before that the extrajudicial offense resolution had elicited a European role model. Discrimination against illegitimate children in hereditary and family law was abolished and the prohibition of violence in child-rearing was enshrined. In 1991, he even acted as a joint presidential candidate for the presidency of the ÖVP and the Freedom Party of Austria (FPÖ).

His reputation, however, fell after the parole of murderer Jack Unterweger, who continued to murder more women and other people thereafter.

== Awards ==
- 1977: Großes Goldenes Ehrenzeichen für Verdienste um die Republik Österreich
- 1984: Großes Silbernes Ehrenzeichen mit dem Stern für Verdienste um die Republik Österreich
- 1990: Großes Goldenes Ehrenzeichen am Bande für Verdienste um die Republik Österreich
