= Peter Hanke =

Austrian politician (born 1964)

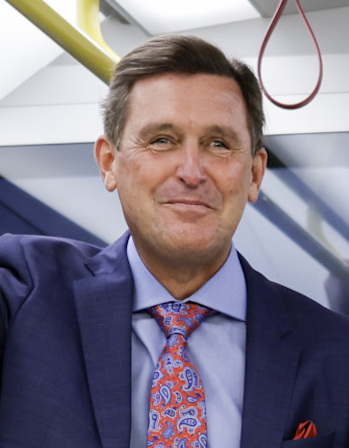
- Hanke in 2015

Minister for Climate Action, Environment, Energy, Mobility, Innovation and Technology
- Incumbent
- Assumed office 3 March 2025
- Chancellor: Christian Stocker

Personal details
- Born: 28 March 1964 (age 62) Vienna, Austria
- Party: Social Democratic Party

Peter Hanke (born 28 March 1964) is an Austrian politician serving as Minister for Climate Action, Environment, Energy, Mobility, Innovation and Technology in the government of Christian Stocker as a member of the Social Democratic Party (SPÖ). He served as the councillor for Finance and Economy of the City of Vienna from 2020 to 2025, as well as manager of Wien Holding from 2002 to 2018.

== Career ==
Hanke was born on 28 March 1964 in Vienna. He is the son of social-democratic politician Erik Hanke (1933 - 2025). He studied business administration at the University of Economics and Business, where he wrote a thesis on the attractiveness factors of a freight distribution center in Vienna, but did not complete the final defense required to obtain his diploma. He joined Wien Holding, a holding company owned by the City of Vienna, in 1993, where he held a variety of positions, and eventually became managing director in 2002.

On May 24, 2018, following a proposal by newly elected Mayor Michael Ludwig, the manager was appointed Executive City Councillor responsible for Finance, Economic Affairs, Digitalization, and International Relations. In addition to his existing responsibilities in finance and the economy, he also assumed oversight of the City of Vienna's press and information services. After the 2020 Viennese elections, the responsibility for overseeing the Vienna public utilities (Wiener Stadtwerke) was added to his role.

Since March 3, 2025, Hanke has served as the Minister for Climate Action, Environment, Energy, Mobility, Innovation, and Technology in the Stocker government. His appointment was not without political tension. Left-wing SPÖ leader Andreas Babler had favored other candidates for the ministerial post, including close ally Michaela Schmidt, and economist Markus Marterbauer. Despite this, Ludwig pushed for Hanke’s nomination as a part of the power struggle between the federal SPÖ leadership under Babler and the more centrist Vienna branch.

== Personal life ==
He is married to Sabine Hanke. In his free time, he runs long-distance and plays tennis.
