= Leopold Waber =

Austrian politician (1875–1945)

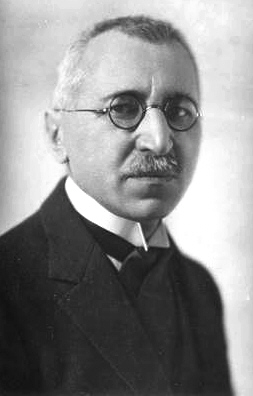

Vice-Chancellor of Austria
- In office 20 November 1924 – 20 October 1926
- Chancellor: Rudolf Ramek
- Preceded by: Felix Frank
- Succeeded by: Franz Dinghofer

Third President of the National Council
- In office 27 October 1926 – 4 December 1930
- President: Wilhelm Miklas; Alfred Gürtler
- Preceded by: Franz Dinghofer
- Succeeded by: Sepp Straffner

Personal details
- Born: 17 March 1875 Uničov, Moravia, Austria-Hungary
- Died: 12 March 1945 (aged 69) Vienna, Nazi Germany
- Party: Greater German People's Party

Leopold Waber (17 March 1875 – 12 March 1945) was an Austrian lawyer and politician.

He served as Vice-Chancellor of Austria and Minister for Judicial Affairs from 1924 to 1926 under Chancellor Rudolf Ramek. He previously served as Minister of the Interior from 1921 to 1922 and Minister of Justice from 1922 to 1923. He also served as Third President of the National Council from 1926 to 1930.
