= Self-elimination of the Austrian Parliament =

1933 constitutional crisis within the First Austrian Republic

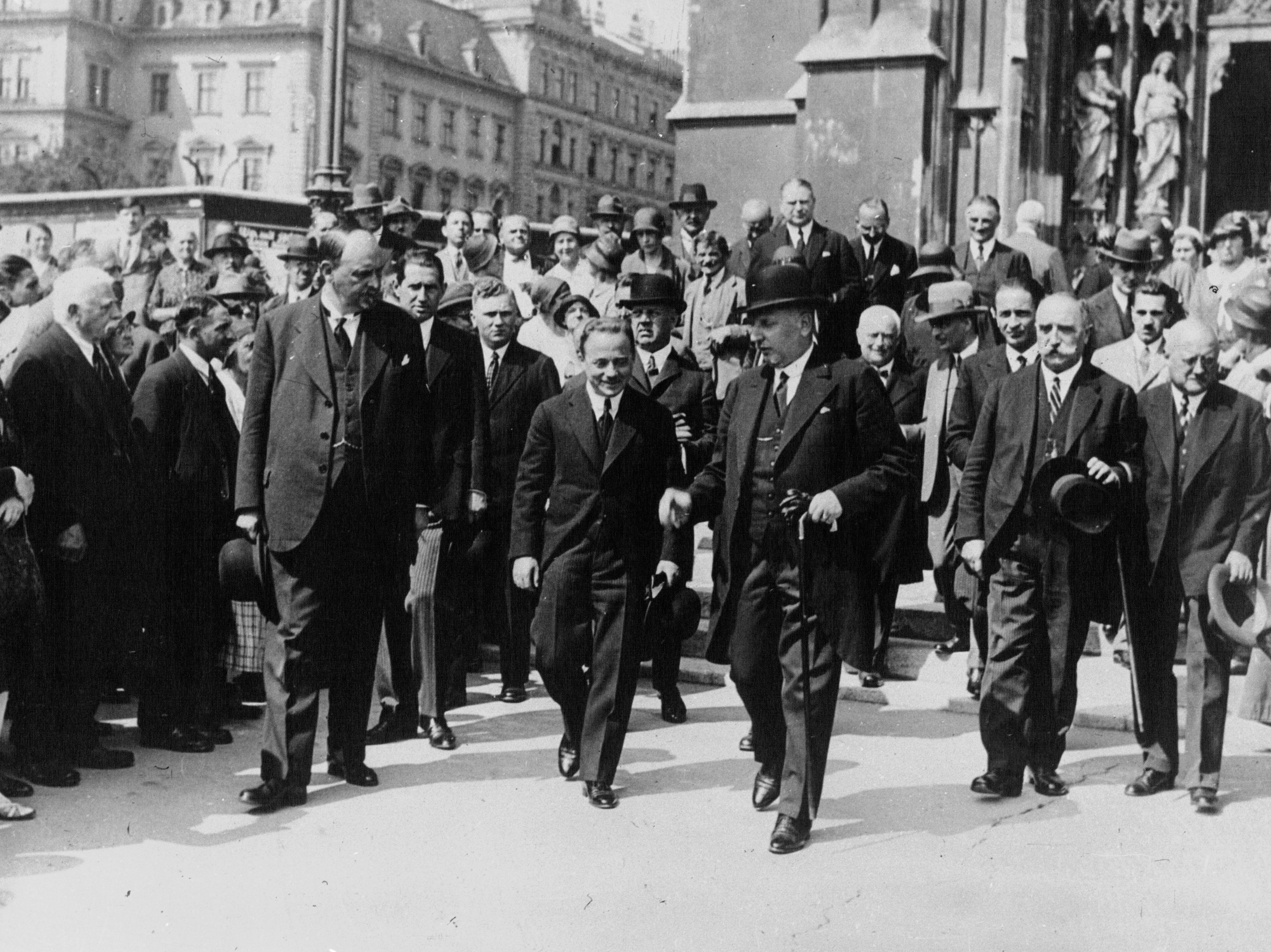
President Miklas (center with bowler hat) and Chancellor Dollfuss (left from Miklas), 1932

The self-elimination of Parliament (German: Selbstausschaltung des Parlaments) was a constitutional crisis in the First Austrian Republic caused by the resignation on March 4, 1933, of all three presidents of the National Council, the more powerful house of the Austrian Parliament. The National Council was left without a presiding officer, when all three chairmen resigned to try to tip the balance in a knife-edge vote. The law had no mechanism for the National Council to operate without a president, and Engelbert Dollfuss, the Chancellor, stated that Parliament had eliminated itself and that his government had the authority to rule by decree under emergency provisions dating from the First World War. This was a decisive step in the transition from a democratic republic to the authoritarian Federal State of Austria, as opposition attempts to reconstitute the National Council were unsuccessful.

== Events of March 4, 1933 ==
When railway workers learned that their salaries were going to be paid in three installments, they went on strike on March 1, 1933. This was the subject of the heated debate in the National Council on March 4, 1933. There were three proposals. The proposal from the Christian Social Party, which was the majority at the time, was to impose disciplinary measures. The Greater German People's Party (GDVP) and the Social Democratic Workers' Party of Austria (SDAPÖ) made proposals that did not include disciplinary measures.

The proposal of the Social Democrats had 70 yes votes and 92 no votes and was therefore rejected. The proposal of the GDVP, however, was seemingly accepted with 81 yes votes and 80 no votes. At 8:40 pm the session was interrupted and then continued at 9:35 pm. After the session was resumed, the president and Chairman of the National Council, Social Democrat Karl Renner, announced that the vote had some irregularities because of the actions of two of his fellow Social Democrats, Wilhelm Scheibein and Simon Abram. It turned out that Abram cast one ballot for himself and another ballot, which carried Abram's name, for Scheibein, who was not in the room at the time when the voting process occurred. This resulted in an uproar and the Christian Socials demanded a new vote. Renner, who saw himself incapable of continuing the session, resigned as president of the National Council to be able to participate in the ensuring vote and therefore secure an additional vote for the Social Democrats.

The second president Rudolf Ramek, a Christian Social, took over as chairman. He declared that the previous vote was invalid and demanded that the vote should be repeated. This resulted in another uproar. Ramek stepped down as president and the third president Sepp Straffner from the GDVP became Chairman of the National Council before immediately stepping down. This left the National Council without a presiding officer. Without a presiding officer, the session could not be closed and the National Council was incapable of acting. The Members left the chamber as consequence.

== Dollfuss's interpretation ==
The events of March 4, 1933, were an unexpected boon for Chancellor Engelbert Dollfuss, who had sought an opportunity for imposing authoritarian rule. Dollfuss declared that the parliament had "eliminated itself," creating a situation "not provided for in the constitution". This "self-elimination" gave Dollfuss a pretext for a self-coup, since he had no intention of allowing the National Council to meet in full again. On March 7, the Dollfuss government stated that it was not affected by the crisis and assumed emergency powers. It then announced that the "Wartime Economy Authority Law", an emergency law that was passed in Austria-Hungary in 1917, would be used as a basis to rule. The first section of this law reads as follows:

The government is empowered for the duration of the extraordinary conditions brought about by the war to make provision through decree for the necessary measures for promoting and revitalizing economic activities, for warding off economic damages, and supplying the population with food and other necessities.

== Events of March 15, 1933 ==
On March 15, 1933, the Greater German People's Party (GDVP) and the Social Democratic Workers' Party of Austria (SDAPÖ), which formed the opposition at that time, tried to continue the session that was aborted on March 4. They were, however, stopped by the Gendarmerie by order of the government and threatened with the use of armed force. The resigning and third president of the National Council of the GDVP, Sepp Straffner, canceled his own withdrawal and was sitting with Members of the National Council for the SDAP and GDVP in the parliamentary chamber. The other Members of the National Council were not allowed in parliament, which was surrounded by law enforcement. The Members who were already in parliament were escorted out by police.

== Role of Austrian President Wilhelm Miklas ==
Over a million people signed a petition to ask then sitting Austrian President Wilhelm Miklas to recall the government of Dollfuss and initiate new elections to reinstate the National Council. The constitution gave Miklas the power to do so. However, the president did not act, which allowed Dollfuss to continue ruling without parliament.

== Role of the upper house ==
The upper house of the Austrian Parliament, the Federal Council, had its own presidency and procedures and was thus unaffected by the crisis, and continued to meet after the March 4, 1933 crisis in the lower house. The Federal Council continued to meet until it was abolished by the May 1934 constitution. However, as the Federal Council was dominated by the Social Democrats and National Socialists after the provincial elections in April 1932, the Dolfuss government did not look favourably towards it.

On March 17, the Federal Council demanded Dolfuss attend its sitting, Dolfuss declined, and the Federal Council passed a resolution objecting to the Dolfuss government's constitutional violations, objecting to the obstruction of the National Council from engaging in its legislative activities, using the police to prevent the National Council from re-convening, the government's usurping of the Council's right to make legislation, demanding the immediate restoration of the constitutional order, the repeal of decrees made under the emergency law, and instructing the chairman to inform the President of Austria that the Federal Council requested the dismissal of the Chancellor.

== Aftermath ==
The liquidation of the Parliament furthered political tensions in the country. On February 12, 1934, SDAPÖ and its paramilitary wing (Republikanischer Schutzbund) started an armed rebellion against Dolfuss, which was later joined by the Communist Party of Austria (KPÖ), which had already been banned by the government in 1933 and was operating underground. The rebellion was quickly crushed by the Austrian Armed Forces and CS's paramilitary forces (Heimwehr and Ostmärkische Sturmscharen) and SDAPÖ and its affiliated trade unions were banned by the government.

In the following months, all political parties except the Christian Social Party were dissolved and the democratic constitution was replaced by a corporatist constitution modelled along the lines of Benito Mussolini's fascism (austrofascism). The Fatherland Front was later established, merging the Christian Social Party and right-wing paramilitary militia, establishing a one-party state which lasted until the annexation of Austria into the German Reich in 1938.

== Legacy ==
To ensure that the parliament would never "eliminate itself" again, in 1948 (after its post-war re-establishment) the National Council amended its standing orders to allow the oldest Member of the National Council to preside if the three presidents were not able to execute their duties as chairmen.
