= Anna Sporrer =

Austrian jurist (born 1962)

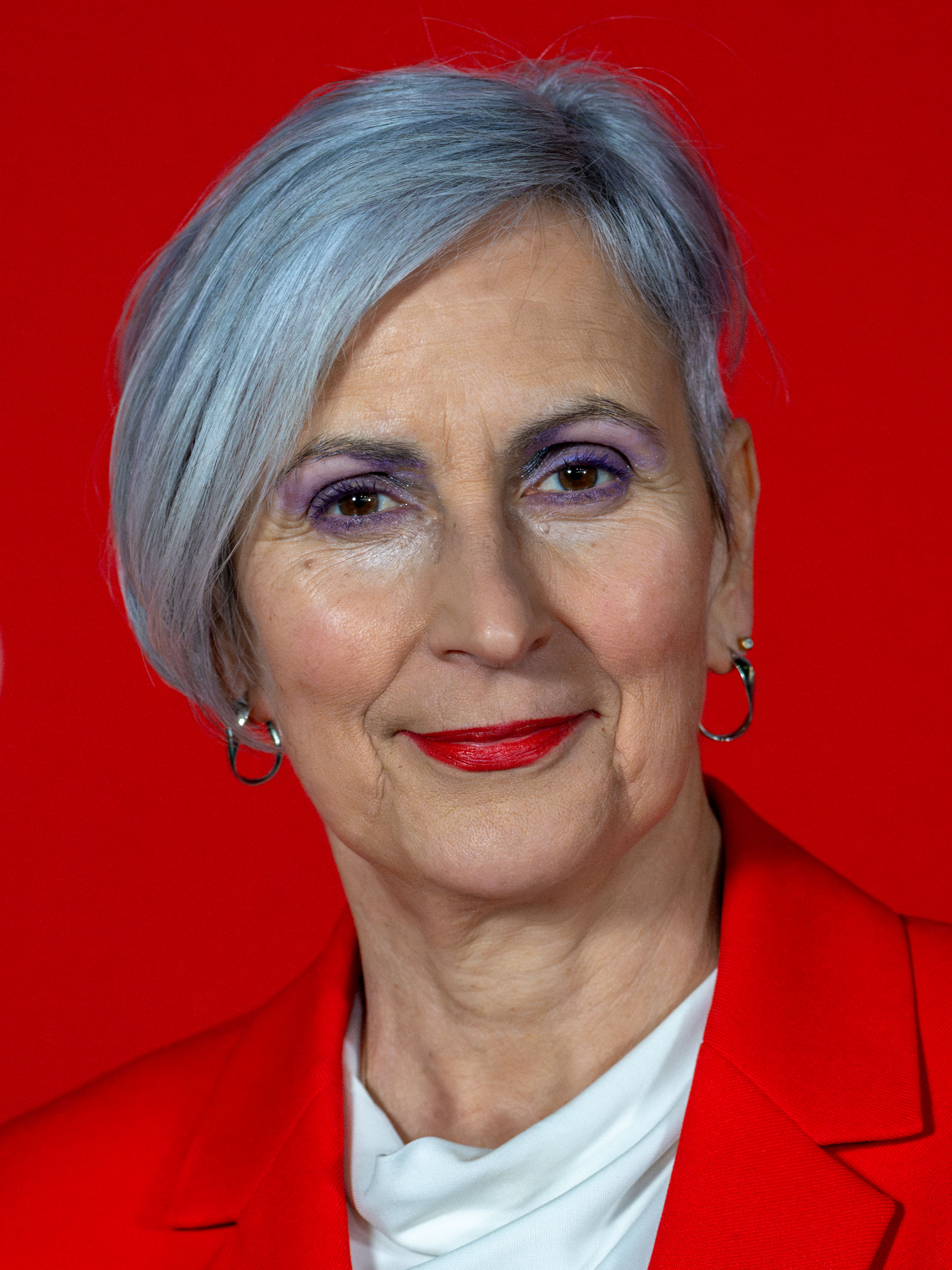
- Sporrer in 2026

Minister of Justice
- Incumbent
- Assumed office 3 March 2025
- Chancellor: Christian Stocker
- Preceded by: Alma Zadić

Vice President of the Supreme Administrative Court
- In office 1 January 2014 – 3 March 2025
- Preceded by: Rudolf Thienel
- Succeeded by: Bettina Maurer-Kober

Personal details
- Born: 7 July 1962 (age 63)
- Party: Social Democratic Party

Anna Sporrer (born 7 July 1962 in Mödling) is an Austrian jurist who has been serving as the Minister for Justice in the Stocker government since 4 March 2025 as a member of the Social Democratic Party.

== Career ==
Sporrer was born in Mödling, Lower Austria in 1962. She studied law at the University of Vienna, earning a diploma and subsequently a doctorate from the same institution. Her dissertation was titled "Gleichberechtigung und Gleichheitsgrundsatz – Gleichbehandlung und Frauenförderung aus der Sicht des Verfassungs- und Europarechtes" (Equality and the Principle of Equal Treatment – Equal Treatment and the Promotion of Women from the Perspective of Constitutional and European Law).

Anna Sporrer taught as a lecturer at the University of Vienna, including at the Institute for Constitutional and Administrative Law and the Institute for Political Science. During her doctoral studies, she worked as a constitutional law associate at the Constitutional Court. In May 1995, she was appointed by Chancellor Franz Vranitzky as chair of the Equal Treatment Commission. In 1996, she joined the Constitutional Service of the Chancellery, where she was responsible for constitutional and EU legal matters related to financial, labor, and social law.

From 2004 to 2008, Sporrer took leave from public service to train as a lawyer. She worked as a candidate attorney, passed the bar exam in July 2008, and practiced law until the end of that year. She relinquished her license on 31 December 2008 and rejoined the Constitutional Service in early 2009, later becoming deputy head of section and coordinating multiple departments, including those for international human rights, minority affairs, and economic law.

From September 2010 to April 2011, she served as chief of staff to Minister Gabriele Heinisch-Hosek, before returning to her previous role. In January 2012, she also took over the department for economic legal affairs. She was appointed Vice President of the Supreme Administrative Court in January 2014, becoming a judge at one of Austria’s three highest courts. Since 2015, she has taught in the University of Vienna’s postgraduate European Studies program, focusing on gender, law, and social policy in the EU.

On 3 March 2025, Sporrer was sworn in by President Alexander Van der Bellen as Minister of Justice in the Stocker government. She was nominated by the Social Democratic Party (SPÖ), of which she has stated she has been a member "for many years."

== Positions ==
She supports the establishment of a Federal Prosecutor’s Office (Bundesstaatsanwaltschaft) as an independent authority to serve as the highest supervisory body for prosecutions, thereby removing direct ministerial influence over individual cases. Sporrer has described this reform as a deliberate step toward limiting her own powers, aiming to eliminate perceptions of a "two-tiered justice system." She advocates for internal specialization within public prosecution offices to increase efficiency, while rejecting the creation of separate prosecutorial institutions such as an anti-terror office.

A member of the Social Democratic Party, Sporrer promotes a feminist justice policy, including the expansion of forensic medical units for victims of violence and stronger state support for women affected by abuse. She also supports incorporating the principle of the best interests of the child in asylum proceedings, while distinguishing it from family reunification policy. Sporrer has emphasized the need for realistic budgeting in the justice sector, asserting that “the rule of law comes at a cost.

== Personal life ==
Sporrer is married to TV journalist Robert Wiesner and has a daughter. She has a fondness for southern Burgenland.
