= Franz Dinghofer =

Austrian politician, lawyer and judge (1873–1956)

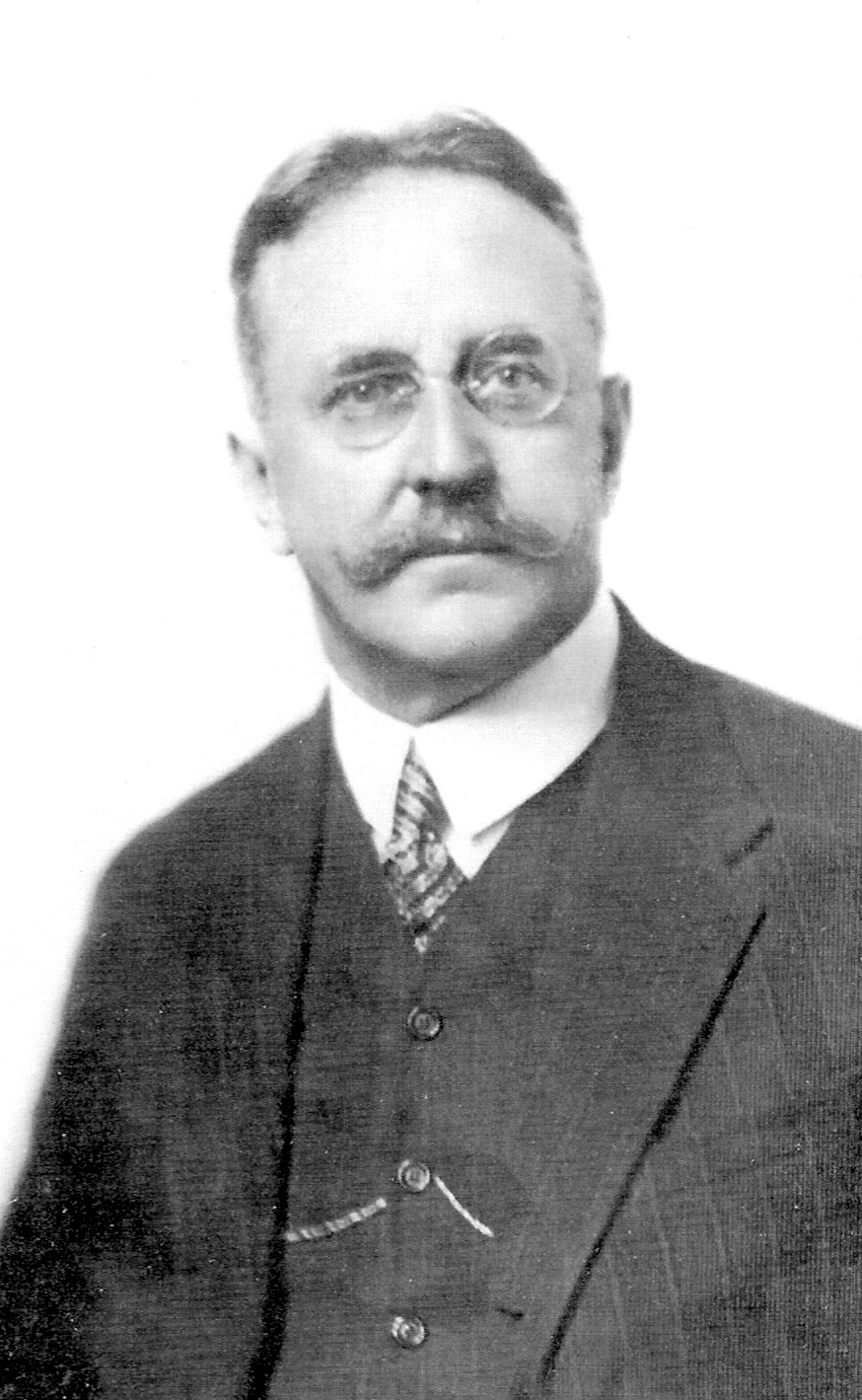

President of the Supreme Court of Justice
- In office 1 October 1928 – 2 May 1938
- Preceded by: Julius Roller
- Succeeded by: Guido Strobele-Wangendorf

Federal Minister of Justice
- In office 20 October 1926 – 4 July 1928
- Chancellor: Ignaz Seipel
- Preceded by: Leopold Waber
- Succeeded by: Ignaz Seipel

Vice-Chancellor of Austria
- In office 20 October 1926 – 19 May 1927
- Chancellor: Ignaz Seipel
- Preceded by: Leopold Waber
- Succeeded by: Karl Hartleb
Presiding officer positions
Third President of the National Council (Note: National Assembly (12 March 1919 to 20 November 1920))
In office 12 March 1919 – 20 October 1926
President	Richard Weiskirchner; Wilhelm Miklas
Preceded by	Office established
Succeeded by	Leopold Waber
President of the National Assembly
In office 21 October 1918 – 4 March 1919
Preceded by	Office established
Succeeded by	Karl Seitz

Personal details
- Born: Franz Seraph Dinghofer; 6 April 1873 Ottensheim, Austria-Hungary
- Died: 12 January 1956 (aged 82) Vienna, Austria
- Cause of death: Liver disease
- Party: Nazi (from July 1940)
- Other political affiliations: German-National Party; Greater German People's Party
- Spouse: Cäcilia Meindl (m. 1899)
- Children: 3
- Parent(s): Franz Dinghofer; Karoline Grünberger
- Education: Gymnasium, Freistadt; University of Graz
- Occupation: Politician; Judge; Lawyer

Franz Seraph Dinghofer (6 April 1873 – 12 January 1956) was an Austrian politician, lawyer and judge who served as the President of the Supreme Court of Justice from 1928 to 1938, having previously served as Minister of Justice from 1926 to 1927 and Vice-Chancellor of Austria from 1926 to 1928.

== Early life and education ==
Franz Seraph Dinghofer was born in Ottensheim in Urfahr-Umgebung, Upper Austria on 6 April 1873. He was the second to last of eight children born to Franz Dinghofer and Karoline Grünberger. His grandfather, Franz Dinghofer, was from Waidhofen an der Ybbs and served as the last judge of the Ottensheim market from 1842 to 1847. His grandfather was an innkeeper and postmaster in Ottensheim, a position which later passed to Dinghofer's father who was the innkeeper from 1867 to 1882 and again from 1885 to 1888; in the office of the Mayor of Ottensheim. In 1870 and 1871, Dinghofer's father, following the construction of a roller ferry across the Danube which connected with Wilhering Abbey, he invested 200 fl. in the company. Dinghofer's father had also invested in the new company which was formed after the first shareholders had left the original company due to setbacks caused by floods and ice blasts in 1882. Dinghofer's parents married in 1862, and most of Dinghofer's siblings died in their youth due to disease. With his older sister Elise (1863–c. 1883), who died at the age of 20 due to tuberculosis, and his older brother Louis (1869–1906), who later emigrated to America and died in St. Louis, Dinghofer grew up in his father's house due to illness and shared a room there.

Dinghofer attended the local elementary school from 1879 to 1884 in Ottensheim. He then moved to study at the Gymnasium in Freistadt in 1884, where he graduated from in 1892. Linz was closer and easier to reach than Freistadt. However, his parents probably sent Dinghofer to Freidstadt due to his older brother Leopold's indulgence in city life and poor academic performance at Linz. Dinghofer's father died at the age of 54 on 13 August 1890. As the eldest son, Dinghofer's brother Leopold was originally chosen to take over the inn but since he had moved away, Dinghofer was the next in line to his father's inheritance. However, his mother recognised that he would not be best suited for this. Dinghofer's mother died of cancer on 10 October 1898. After her husband's death, she had initially moved to live with relatives in Salzburg, but later moved to Urfahr.

=== University education and adulthood ===
After graduating from his school, in July 1892 Dinghofer went to study law at the University of Graz. Whilst studying at the university, he made a choice that would be decisive for his later career and shape the rest of his life. In October 1892, he joined the fraternity Ostmark-Graz. Whilst he had been brought up with liberal views by his parents, who were members of the liberal party, this marked his change to nationalist ideologies. He served on numerous committees whilst there including the Court of Honor Committee and the Bismarck Celebration Committee in 1895, as well as several other committees. On 6 March 1897, he received a doctorate in law.

Dinghofer served as a one-year volunteer with the Tyrolean Kaiserjäger regiment before being released due to health concerns, though the exact date of his military service is unknown. Fritz Mayrhofer estimated the date to be c. 1892.

=== Law practice and marriage ===
After completing his studies, Dinghofer became a legal trainee at the Regional Court of Linz on 19 March 1897. On 1 April 1898, he began working at the Regional Court of Vienna before becoming a Court adjunct at the Regional Court of Linz on 23 March 1899. He passed his judicial exam in Vienna on 24 November 1898, and in June 1902 transferred to the District Court of Urfahr where he was a judge for civil and criminal matters.

Dinghofer married Cäcilia Meindl in the Capuchin Church in Linz on 6 June 1899. They had three children together: Franz in 1900, Margarate in 1901, and Else in 1917. For his marriage, he bought a house in Linz, whilst his other estate became a summer residence.

== Early local political career (1901–1907) ==
=== Early council career (1901–1905) ===
In March 1901, Dinghofer was nominated as a candidate for the municipal council of Linz. On 29 April, he was elected for a three-year term to the municipal council with the highest number of votes. He won 360 votes out of an electorate of 1,453, although the turnout was 385. He was reelected in the 1904 election with 277 votes. After joining the local council, he became a member for the committee for property and legal matters, and became its deputy chairman serving until his election as deputy mayor. The main work in his early council career focused on areas the committee dealt with including requests for temporary employment, promotions, advancements, appointments and disciplinary issues. Dinghofer was a member of the hospital committee from 1901 to 1906 and the committee for city beautification from 1901 to 1904, and was the deputy chairman for the committee for welfare institutions from 1902 to 1907.

His early council career was marked by his political opposition to the political leadership and colleagues, largely due to his belief to represent the interests of the suburbs rather than the inner city. In 1902, he opposed in the proposed increase in levies on the suburbs from 38% to 47%, citing the heavy impact on the poorer members of the suburbs amongst other reasons for his opposition to the proposition. He rejected the 9% increase but said that the city's should remain at 47%. After debate on the topic, the increase in levies on the suburbs was approved by a majority of votes. Another of his concerns during his early career was improving road conditions in the city, where he criticised that Linz was not at the same level as other cities regarding paving the streets, as well the crossings from the suburbs which were yet to be constructed.

=== Deputy Mayor of Linz (1905–1907) ===
==== Election ====
On 17 May 1905, Dinghofer was elected Deputy Mayor of Linz; winning 34 out of 37 votes and succeeding Franz Lampl. In his election speech, regarding his election after serving on the council for just four years, Dinghofer said that it was not due to ambition but to be a servant for common good. Dinghofer joined and served on several more committees as Deputy Mayor: the railway committee (later the transport committee which he became chairman of in 1907), the military tax commission from 1905 to 1909, and the consumption tax committee from 1905 to 1907. He was also given responsibility for the policy force as Deputy Mayor.

==== Municipal reorganisation ====
During his tenure, his most notable work was the reorganisation of the municipal administration. For him, there were three requirements for any good administration: systematics, uniformity and the greatest simplicity possible. A main part of the reorganisation involved reducing the amount of duties of the Mayor by removing unnecessary agenda. Until Dinghofer's reforms, every piece of business had to be presented mayor. Dinghofer changed this so that the Mayor remained the leading position whose instructions the municipal employees had to follow, but the heads of departments were given more extensive powers than before. A magistrate was then created which was headed by the Mayor, or by one of the two deputy Mayors or the municipal director, who was given authority to give any officials instructions. Dinghofer's reorganisation allowed for civil servants to take greater responsibility thereby allowing the Mayor to focus on more important issues.

== Mayor of Linz (1907–1918) ==
He became the Mayor of Linz in 1907.

== In Parliament (1918–1926) ==
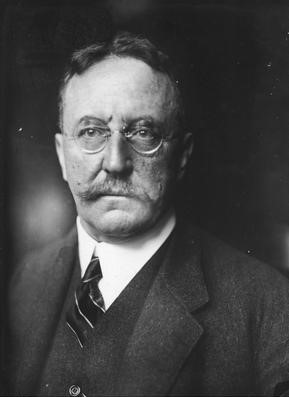
Dinghofer, pictured between c. 1907–1926

He was elected to the Austrian Parliament in 1918.

== In government (1926–1928) ==
He served as the Vice-Chancellor of Austria from 1925 to 1926 and as Minister of Justice from 1926 to 1928.

== Supreme court president (1928–1938) ==
He later served as the President of the Supreme Court of Justice from 1928 to 1938.

== Later life and death (1938–1956) ==
Dinghofer joined the Nazi Party on 1 July 1940.

He died of liver disease, at the age of 82, on 12 January 1956 in Vienna.

== Legacy ==
Dinghofer's legacy is highly controversial because of his allegiance to the Third Reich and his radical anti-semitism throughout his life. During Austria's First Republic, Dinghofer had belonged to the German nationalist Greater German People's Party.

In 2025, a Dinghofer conference organized by Walter Rosenkranz at the Austrian Parliament drew strong criticism from public intellectuals in Austria. The event was rejected by all Austrian political parties represented in parliament with the exception of the FPÖ. A civil society panel discussion was counter-conducted.
