= Österreichisches Jungvolk =

Former state youth organization

Austrian Young People
- Österreichisches Jungvolk
- Predecessor: Young Fatherland; East March Youth
- Formation: 1936; 90 years ago
- Dissolved: 1938; 88 years ago
- Type: Political youth organisation
- Region served: Federal State of Austria
- Members: 350,000 (1938 est.)
- Parent organization: Fatherland Front

The Österreichisches Jungvolk (German pronunciation: [ˌøːstəʁaɪçɪʃəs ˈjʊŋfɔlk], lit. 'Austrian Young People') was the state youth organization of Austria during the era of Austrofascism. It was founded in August 1936 and at the time of its dissolution in 1938 it had around 350,000 members between the ages of 6 and 18. It represented the youth organization of the Fatherland Front.

== History ==
Already in 1933, under Engelbert Dollfuss, there were plans to set up an "apolitical, patriotic youth organization" with the name "Young Fatherland". In March 1934, the Catholic youth organizations were united in the "Austrian Young Front", officially, but mainly for the planned state youth closed to preserve the patriotic interests and to counter strengthened. An organization "Young Fatherland" was also created, however, as an organization of the home guard (which at the time acted as "Austrian Homeland Security"), it finally had 70,000 members in 2000 local groups across Austria.

The Fatherland Front wanted a youth organization based on the Italian Balilla or the German Hitler Youth. The foundation in 1936 was preceded by a working group of the youth organizations of the Austrian Homeland Security, Young Fatherland, Ostmärkische Sturmscharen, and the Ostmarkjugend.

== Creation and development ==
On August 12, 1936, Guido Zernatto announced for the first time the name of the planned youth organization, "Austrian Young People". The ÖJV was founded on August 28, 1936, through the amalgamation of Young Fatherland and Ostmarkjugend. In the law on the patriotic upbringing of youth outside school, which came into force the next day, [2]All non-denominational youth clubs and groups outside of the state youth were subject to an authorization requirement. The continued existence of youth groups was linked to the association's membership in the ÖJV, provided that it was not an association solely for the purpose of vocational training or Catholic youth organizations.

In November 1936, the Christian-German gymnastics youth joined the ÖJV.

There was a further strong increase in membership when, in the course of 1937, the Catholic youth associations with large members were also incorporated into the state youth. This was done under pressure from the regime and against the agreements of the concordat signed in 1933, in which the Catholic youth organizations were guaranteed in their existence. However, the church retained certain independence, the members of its youth organizations were members of both organizations and they could only be used for events of the ÖJV with the consent of the church authorities.

Even though membership was never mandatory, the monopoly of the ÖJV was gradually expanded. For example, admission to the officer's career in the army or the granting of school fees were linked to membership in the state youth. Even after the membership ban for the Patriotic Front (VF) on October 31, 1937, members of the ÖJV who were under the age of 18 could still be admitted to the VF.

Nevertheless, the regimen intended to summarize the entire Austrian youth in the ÖJV ultimately could not be realized. Among other things, this was due to the extensive activity of anti-regime, illegal youth associations, in particular the Austrian Hitler Youth, but also the Revolutionary Socialist Youth and the Austrian Communist Youth Association. These groups tried, sometimes successfully, to infiltrate the state youth and to influence the politically indifferent members in an anti-regime sense. Further reasons were the completely insufficient financial resources and the hostility of large parts of the Catholic clergy towards the state youth.

The question of whether Protestant or Jewish youth associations (such as the Betar or the Hakoah ) should also be included in the ÖJV remained unanswered for a long time. Finally, in January 1938, it was decided that the same agreements should be made with Protestant youth associations as with Catholic ones, but that the Jewish associations should be grouped together in Austria's newly founded Jewish Youth Association. This was done with regard to latent anti-Semitismin large parts of the population, officially it was said that this should not be seen as anti-Semitism, but "it is hardly to be expected of Jewish parents to send their children to an organization in which the youth are raised according to the principles of Christianity" and one wants " take into account the self-chosen special position of Judaism. "However, Jews were not explicitly prohibited from joining the ÖJV. Due to the integrated, non-denominational Austrian Scout Association, a larger number of Jewish youths were also integrated into the state youth.

In March 1938, after the Berchtesgaden Agreement, the National Socialists became more and more likely to take power, and many left-wing young people, including Hugo Pepper, joined the ÖJV in the hope of being able to form a united front for young people against the National Socialist threat. In fact, in the days leading up to Austria's integration, the state youth was one of the few active organizations on the part of the regime.

== Resolution ==
After the "connection" the ÖJV was dissolved. While most of the members let themselves be integrated into the Hitler Youth without resistance, a small number of former members decided to actively resist National Socialism. Well-known ÖJV members in the Catholic conservative youth resistance were the brother's Fritz and Otto Molden and the lawyer Hubert Jurasek.

== Organization ==
According to its statutes, the ÖJV was managed by a directorate. This consisted of Chancellor Kurt Schuschnigg, State Secretary Guido Zernatto, Minister of Education Hans Pernter, and Ernst Rüdiger Starhemberg, who had been de facto disempowered since May 1936. The federal youth leader Georg Thurn-Valsassina, a brother-in-law of Starnberg, was responsible for the practical management. He was subordinate to the nine-state youth leaders and subsequently the district youth leaders and local youth leaders. Independent of the ÖJV local groups, so-called groups existed in much higher schools. Student Free Corps in contrast to the usual local groups were not led by adult youth leaders, but by senior middle school students.

== Education content ==
The contents of the ÖJV were strongly oriented towards the state youth organizations in Germany and Italy. Physical training and pre-military upbringing were given absolute priority in the male sub-organization. In the age group of 14 to 18-year-olds, a field combat day with small-caliber shooting and training on the radio was planned as well as four physical exercise hours per month. In addition, the work program included a patriotic-cultural training and, to a lesser extent, a moral-religious one instruction given by the local priest. In addition to hiking afternoons and gymnastics, the main focus of the female ÖJV groups was training in reproductive activities such as cooking, childcare, and sewing.

== Uniform and symbols ==
The uniform of the male members was strongly based on the adjustment of the former home guard. It consisted of an olive green shirt, a black tie and a green cap with the ÖJV badge. A cross was sewn on the sleeve. The female ÖJV members wore a dirndl dress with a shoulder scarf, which was held together by a brooch with the ÖJV badge. The badge was a stylized interleaving of the letters OeJV. The flag was green on one side and showed the association symbol, on the other white with a prickly cross.

== See also ==
- Deutsches Jungvolk

== Literature ==
- Johanna Gehmacher: youth without a future. Hitler Youth and the Federation of German Girls in Austria before 1938, Picus, Vienna 1994, ISBN 3-85452-253-3, pp. 401–420 (dissertation Uni Wien 1993, under the title: National Socialist Youth Organizations in Austria, 479 pages).
- Thomas Pammer: VF-Werk "Austrian Young People". History and aspects of the state organization of youth in the Dollfuß-Schuschnigg regime 1933–1938, diploma thesis, Vienna 2011, online on the website of the University of Vienna (PDF; 1.07 MB).
- Franz Gall: On the history of the Austrian young people 1935–1938. In: Rudolf Neck, Adam Wandruszka [Ed.] Contributions to contemporary history. Commemorative publication Ludwig Jedlicka on his 60th birthday, St. Pölten 1976, pp. 217–235.
- Ulrike Kemmerling-Unterthurner: The state youth organization in Austria 1933–1938 with special attention to Vorarlberg. In: Historical viewpoints. Commemorative publication for Johann Rainer, Innsbruck 1988, pp. 311–330.
- Irmgard Bärnthaler: The Patriotic Front. History and organization, Europa Verlag, Vienna 1971, ISBN 3-203-50379-7, LCCN 78--88736, OCLC 439515362, pp. 172–177.
