= Harald Ofner =

Austrian politician (1932–2026)

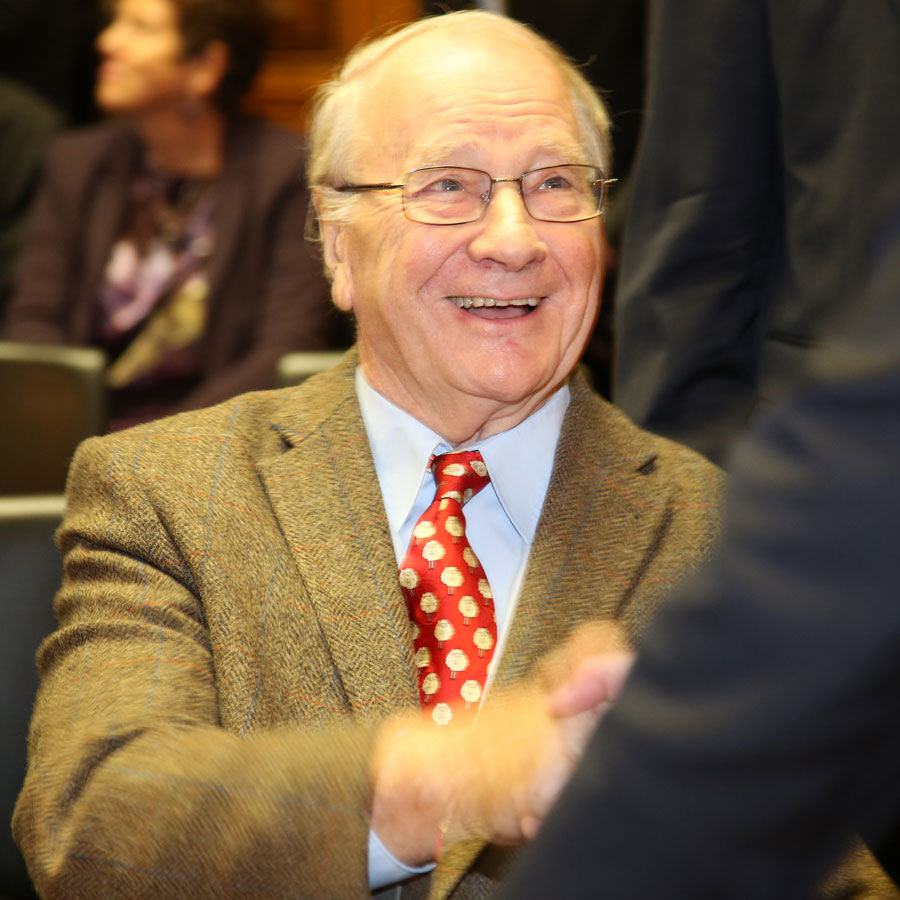
Ofner in 2014

Harald Ofner (25 October 1932 – 8 April 2026) was an Austrian lawyer and politician for the Freedom Party of Austria (FPÖ).

== Life and career ==
From 1942 to 1945 Ofner attended the Nazi-era National Political Institutes of Education in Traiskirchen near Vienna. Subsequently, he became a heavy current electrician. He attended a Matura school and studied law (Dr. iur., 1958). By 1965, he was a lawyer.

His political career began in the town council of Mödling. From 1976 to 1986, he was a provincial team leader of the FPÖ Lower Austria branch. From 1979 to 1983 and 1986 to 2002, he was a deputy to the National Council. From 1983 to 1987, Ofner was Austrian Minister of Justice in the governments of Fred Sinowatz and Franz Vranitzky.

Ofner previously defended Peter Paul Rainer in 2000. Rainer, who by 1997 was the former party chairman and co-founder of the South Tyrol-based FPÖ offshoot Die Freiheitlichen, had shot Christian Waldner, one of the other co-founding members of Die Freiheitlichen. Despite efforts by Ofner, Rainer was extradited to Italy, shortly after his arrest in the Rudolfsheim-Fünfhaus district of Vienna.

During the Lucona affair, Ofner – then Minister of Justice – first said a popular phrase. He actuated in a parliamentary debate by saying "Die Suppe ist zu dünn" (lit. 'The soup is too thin'), meaning that the evidence for an accusation was not sufficient. Since then, this saying has been used in judicial and journalist circles for similar cases.

Ofner died on 8 April 2026, at the age of 93.
