= Fatherland Front (Austria) =

Political party in Austria (1933–1938)

Fatherland Front Vaterländische Front
- Federal leader: Engelbert Dollfuß (20 May 1933 – 25 July 1934); Ernst Starhemberg (31 July 1934 – 15 May 1936)
- Founded: 20 May 1933; 93 years ago
- Dissolved: 13 March 1938; 88 years ago
- Merger of: CS, Landbund, Heimwehr
- Youth wing: Österreichisches Jungvolk
- Paramilitary wing: Ostmärkische Sturmscharen (until 1936); Assault Corps
- Membership: 3,000,000 (1937 est.)
- Ideology: Austrofascism: Austrian nationalism; Corporate statism; Authoritarian conservatism; Clerical fascism
- Political position: Right-wing to far-right
- Religion: Catholicism
- Colours: Red Green White
- Slogan: "Österreich, erwache!" (lit. 'Austria, awaken!')
- Anthem: "Song of the Youth"

Party flag
- Other flag

The Fatherland Front (Austrian German: Vaterländische Front, VF) was the ruling political organisation of the Federal State of Austria. It claimed to be a nonpartisan movement, and aimed to unite all the people of Austria, overcoming political and social divisions. Established on 20 May 1933 by Christian Social Chancellor Engelbert Dollfuss as the only legally permitted party in the country, it was aligned with the Catholic Church, and did not advocate any racial ideology. A right-wing conservative, authoritarian, nationalist, corporatist, and Catholic organisation, it advocated independence from Germany on the basis of protecting Austria's Catholic religious identity from what they considered a Protestant-dominated German state.

The Fatherland Front, which was strongly linked with Austria's Catholic clergy, absorbed Dollfuss's Christian Social Party, the agrarian Landbund and the right-wing paramilitary Heimwehren, all of which were opposed to Nazism, Marxism, laissez-faire capitalism and liberal democracy. It established an authoritarian and corporatist regime, the Federal State of Austria, which is commonly known in German as the Ständestaat ("corporate state"). According to the Fatherland Front this form of government and society implemented the social teaching of Pope Pius XI's 1931 encyclical Quadragesimo anno. The Front banned and persecuted all its political opponents, including Communists, Social Democrats—who fought against it in a brief civil war in February 1934—as well as the Austrian Nazis who wanted Austria to join Germany. Chancellor Dollfuss was assassinated by the Nazis in July 1934. He was succeeded as leader of the VF and Chancellor of Austria by Kurt Schuschnigg, who ruled until the invigorated Nazis forced him to resign on 11 March 1938. Austria was annexed by Nazi Germany the next day.

The Fatherland Front maintained a cultural and recreational organisation, called "New Life" (Neues Leben), similar to Germany's Strength Through Joy. The "League of Jewish Front Soldiers" (Bund Jüdischer Frontsoldaten), the largest of several Jewish defense paramilitaries active in Austria at the time, was incorporated into the Fatherland Front.

The role of the Fatherland Front has been a contentious point in post-war Austrian historiography. While many historians consider it to be the exponent of an Austrian and Catholic-clerical variant of fascism—dubbed "Austrofascism"—and make it responsible for the failure of liberal democracy in Austria, conservative authors stress its credits in defending the country's independence and opposition to Nazism.

== Bases of support and opposition ==
While the Front's aim was to unite all Austrians, superseding all political parties, social and economic interest groups (including trade unions), it only enjoyed the support of certain parts of the society. It was mainly backed by the Catholic church, the Austrian bureaucracy, police, military, and most of the rural population—including both landowners and peasants—(with its centre of gravity in western Austria), some loyalists to the Habsburg dynasty, and a significant part of the large Jewish community of Vienna. The VF was strongly linked with the Catholic student fraternities of the Cartell-Verband—that maintained networks similar to old boys in English-speaking countries—in which most VF leaders had been members.

Despite its self-identification as a unifying force, in reality the front was opposed by both the Austrian Nazis and the Social Democrats. Support for the latter, concentrated in Vienna and industrial towns, came from unionised workers and the party's paramilitary Republikanischer Schutzbund ("Republican Protection League"), whose February 1934 uprising (or "Austrian Civil War") was crushed in a few days. The Austrian Nazis, by then dominating Austria's existing pan-German nationalist movement, were supported by a part of the secular, urban middle and lower middle class, including civil servants and public sector workers, professionals, teachers and students. However they did not have a mass following as in Germany.

== History ==
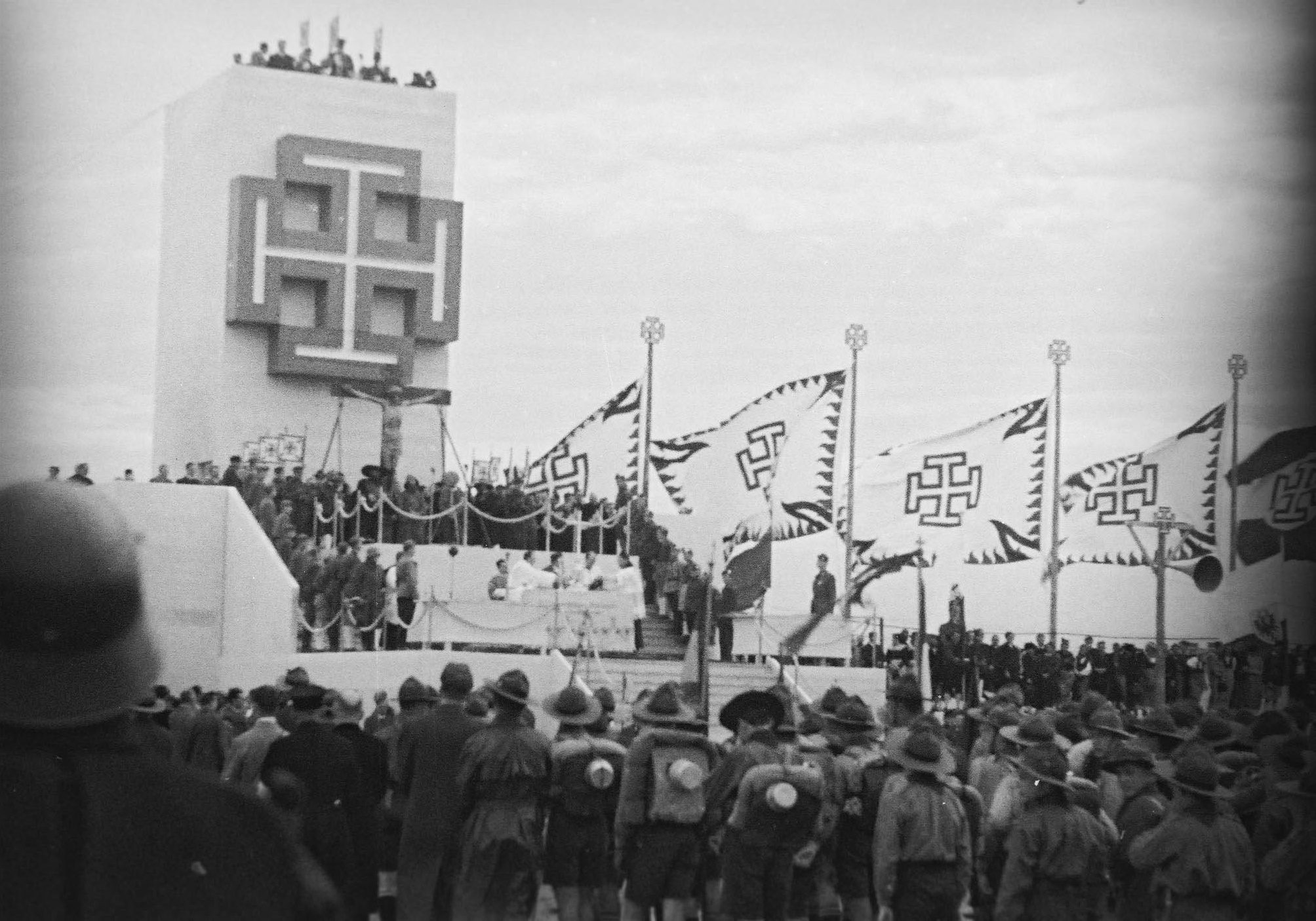
Fatherland Front rally, 1936

After World War I and the dissolution of Austria-Hungary sealed by the 1919 Treaty of Saint-Germain, three political camps controlled the fate of the Austrian First Republic: the Social Democrats, the Christian Social Party, and the German nationalists, organised in the Greater German People's Party and the Landbund. Since 1921 the Christian Social Party had formed coalition governments along with the German nationalists; Chancellor Ignaz Seipel, a proponent of Catholic social teaching, advocated the idea of a "corporated" state surmounting the parliamentary system, based on the encyclicals Rerum novarum (1891) by Pope Leo XIII and Quadragesimo anno (1931) by Pope Pius XI.

=== Creation ===
On 10 May 1932, the Christian Social politician Engelbert Dollfuss was designated Chancellor of Austria by President Wilhelm Miklas. Dollfuss formed another right-wing government together with the Landbund and the Heimatblock, the political organisation of the paramilitary Heimwehr forces. This coalition, however, relied on an extremely narrow majority. Dollfuss exploited a constitutional crisis in March to suspend the National Council and rule by decree, which was tolerated by Miklas. Two months later the "Fatherland Front" was founded by Chancellor Dollfuss as a merger of his Christian Social Party, the Heimwehr forces and other right-wing groups, and was intended to collect all "loyal Austrians" under one banner.

On 30 May 1933, the government banned the Republikanischer Schutzbund, the paramilitary troops of the Social Democratic Party; the Communist Party and the Austrian Nazi Party were prohibited shortly afterwards. From 12 February 1934 onwards, the remaining Schutzbund forces revolted against their disbanding, sparking the Austrian Civil War against Heimwehr troops and the Austrian Armed Forces. After the suppression, the Social Democratic Party too was declared illegal and dissolved. Social Democratic officials like the Vienna mayor Karl Seitz were deposed and replaced by VF politicians.

=== Corporate state ===
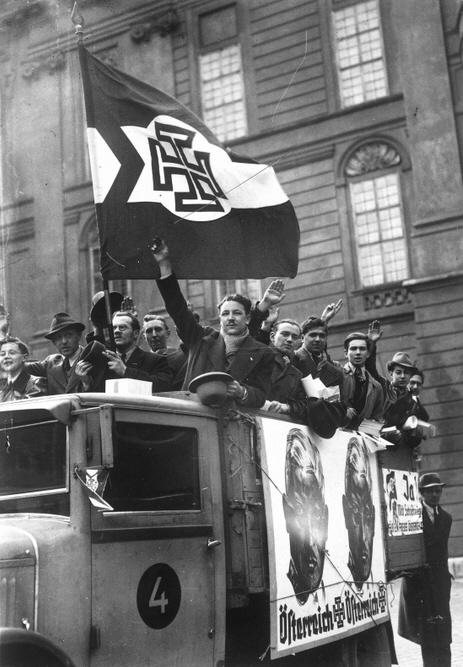
Truck with supporters of Schuschnigg (pictured on the posters) campaigning for the independence of Austria, March 1938 (shortly before the Anschluss)

On 1 May, a rump session of the Nationalrat recast the constitution into an authoritarian and corporatist document. The official name of the country was changed to the Federal State of Austria, with the VF as the only legally permitted political organisation. Thereafter, the organisation held a monopolistic position in Austrian politics with both civilian and military divisions. Dollfuss remained its undisputed leader until his assassination during the Nazi July Putsch on 25 July 1934. He was succeeded by Ernst Rüdiger Starhemberg, while his VF fellow Justice Minister Kurt Schuschnigg became chancellor.

In 1936, Schuschnigg also took over the leadership of the VF. The Front was declared a corporation under public law and the only legal political organisation in Austria. Its symbol was the crutch cross (Kruckenkreuz), and its official greeting was Österreich! ("Austria!") or Front heil!. The party flag was adopted as the second state flag of Austria. Though membership was obligatory for officials, the VF never became a mass movement. By the end of 1937 it had 3 million members (with 6.5 million inhabitants of Austria); it could however never win the support of its political opponents, neither from the circles of the Social Democrats nor from the Austrian Nazis.

=== Anschluss ===
Schuschnigg acknowledged that Austrians were Germans and that Austria was a "German state" but he strongly opposed an Anschluss and passionately wished for Austria to remain independent from Germany.

Schuschnigg's government had to face the increasing pressure by its powerful neighbour Nazi Germany under Austrian-born Adolf Hitler. The state's fate was sealed when the Italian dictator Benito Mussolini approached the German Nazis. To ease tensions, Schuschnigg on 11 July 1936 concluded an agreement, whereafter several conspirators of the 1934 July Putsch were released from prison. Nazi confidants like Edmund Glaise-Horstenau and Guido Schmidt joined Schuschnigg's cabinet, while Arthur Seyss-Inquart attained the office of a State Councillor, though the Austrian Nazi Party remained illegal.

On 12 February 1938 Hitler summoned Schuschnigg to his Berghof residence, constraining the readmission of the Nazi Party and the replacement of the Austrian chief of staff Alfred Jansa by Franz Böhme to pave the way for a Wehrmacht invasion. Schuschnigg had to appoint Seyss-Inquart Minister of the Interior, encouraging the political activation of the Austrian Nazis.

Realizing that he was in a bind, Schuschnigg announced a referendum on Austrian independence. In hopes of increasing the likelihood of a "Yes" vote, he agreed to lift the ban on the Social Democrats and their affiliated trade unions in return for their support of the referendum, dismantling the one-party state. This move came too late. Schuschnigg was finally forced to resign under German pressure on 11 March and was succeeded by Seyss-Inquart. The Fatherland Front was immediately banned after the Anschluss, the annexation of Austria to Germany, two days later.

After the Second World War, in 1945, former members of the Fatherland Front like Julius Raab and Leopold Figl founded the conservative and Christian democratic Austrian People's Party (ÖVP) that became one of the two major parties of the Second Austrian republic. Unlike the Fatherland Front, the ÖVP was fully committed to democracy and put less emphasis on religion.

== See also ==
- Austria within Nazi Germany
