= Markus Marterbauer =

Austrian economist (born 1965)

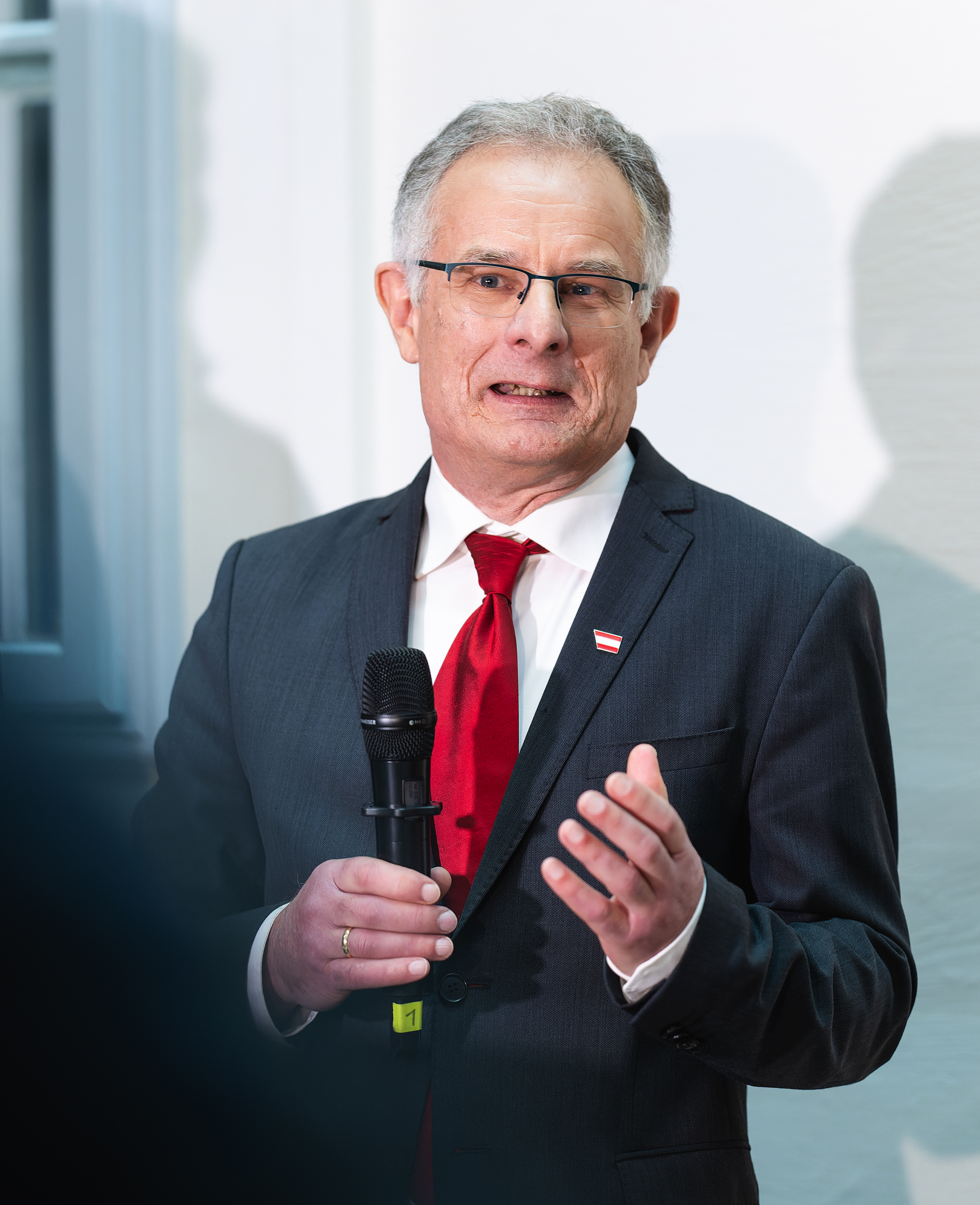
- Marterbauer in 2025

Minister for Finance
- Incumbent
- Assumed office 3 March 2025
- Chancellor: Christian Stocker
- Preceded by: Gunter Mayr

Personal details
- Born: 26 February 1965 (age 61) Uppsala, Sweden
- Party: Social Democratic

Markus Marterbauer (born 26 February 1965) is an Austrian economist and politician of the Social Democratic Party (SPÖ) who has been serving as Minister for Finance in the government of Christian Stocker since 2025.

== Early life and education ==
Born in Uppsala, Sweden, in 1965, Marterbauer grew up in Upper Austria. He did his Matura at the Gmunden grammar school before earning a diploma and a doctorate in economics from the Vienna University of Economics and Business (WU). His dissertation was titled Macroeconomic policy in Europe : a postkeynesian view.

== Career ==
After several years as a university assistant at the Department of Economic Theory and Policy at the WU, Marterbauer became an economics consultant at the Austrian Institute of Economic Research (WIFO) in Vienna. In 2000, he completed a research stay at the Department of Economics at York University in Toronto, Canada. He ran as a candidate for the SPÖ in the 2002 National Council elections - placed 63rd on the federal list and ninth on the Vienna state list - but was not elected.

From 2011, Marterbauer served as head of the Department of Economics and Statistics at the Vienna Chamber of Labour. His numerous publications focus on Austria's budget development and fiscal policy, income policy and redistribution, macroeconomic issues, and social democratic economic policy. In addition to his role at the Chamber of Labour, he also teaches at both the WU and the University of Vienna. A proponent of the Keynesian school, he advocates for active government intervention in the economy.

On 3 March 2025, Marterbauer was appointed Minister for Finance, becoming the first SPÖ finance minister in 25 years. He was widely regarded as the preferred candidate of SPÖ chairman Andreas Babler. By 2026, opion polls showed him as the most popular minister in the ruling three-party coalition government.

== Political positions ==
Known for championing socially equitable economic policies, Marterbauer argues that the economy must be driven by sustainable investment in order to ensure both economic and social security. According to his own account, he has been a member of the SPÖ for "almost 40 years".

== Personal life ==
In July 2026, Marterbauer announced that he has cancer and would undergo treatment for three months while remaining in ‌office and continuing to work.
