= Sepp Straffner =

Austrian politician (1875–1952)

Sepp Straffner (31 January 1875 Bad Goisern – 29 October 1952) was an Austrian federal railway official and politician in the Greater German People's Party. He was a pupil at Hallstatt near Salzkammergut, then a student in the Forestry Service at Goisern. He attended high school in Linz. Between 1899 and 1907 he was an official with the Tyrol and Salzburg service of the State Railways at Innsbruck. He went on to study law at the universities of Vienna and Innsbruck (PhD 1913).

== Politics ==
Straffner was active in Georg von Schönerer's German National Movement (Deutschnationale Bewegung). He was a member of the council of Saalfelden, the Tyrolean Landtag and from 1918 to 1919 member of the Tyrolean government. In 1919 he was successful in the Constitutional Assembly elections, becoming a member of the Republic of German-Austria legislature, and from 1920 to 1923 and 1927 to 1934 a deputy in the National Council. In 1930–31 and 1932–33, he served as third president of the National Council.

=== End of the First Republic ===
He was one of the three national presidents who on 4 March 1933 resigned his office during a debate on a railway strike, precipitating a constitutional crisis, the dissolution of parliament and the seizure of power by the Chancellor, Engelbert Dollfuss as dictator. On 15 March 1933 Straffner tried to withdraw his resignation and reconvene the parliamentary session but Dollfuss had ordered the police to prevent this "undeclared meeting" ( „nicht angemeldete Versammlung“) or to disperse it if it occurred, even though many members of the Greater German and Social Democrat parties were already present in the chamber. Handed a copy of Dollfuss' order, Straffner filed a criminal complaint against Dollfuss under § 76 Criminal Code (public violence).

== Aftermath ==
From 1934 to 1935 he was manager of the daily newspaper Alpenland.

== See also ==
- History of Austria
- List of political parties in Austria
- First Austrian Republic
