= Ostmärkische Sturmscharen =

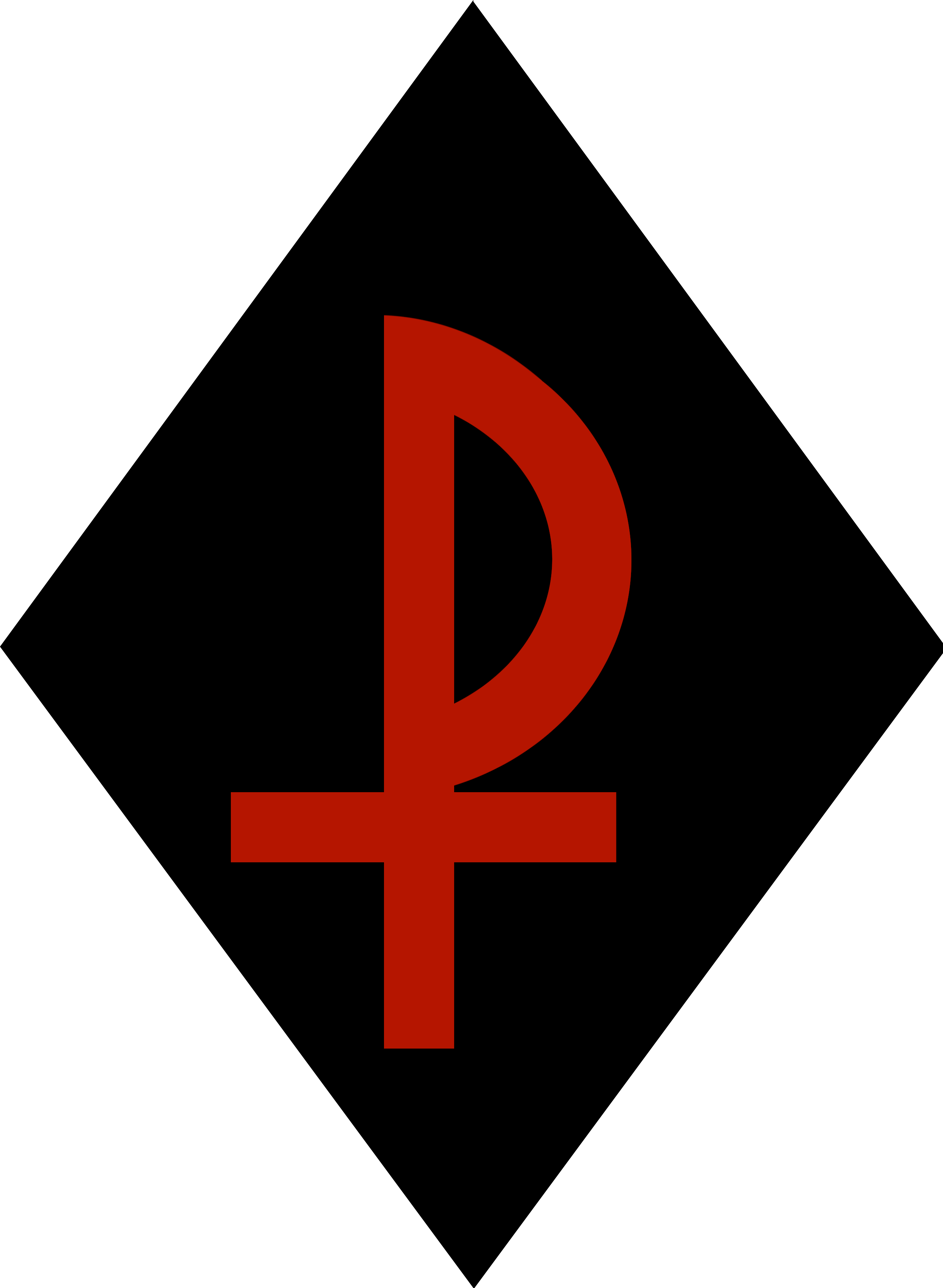
- Historical leader: Kurt Schuschnigg
- Founded: 7 December 1930
- Dissolved: 11 April 1936
- Merged into: Fatherland Front
- Headquarters: Vienna, Austria
- Membership: 15,000 (1933)
- Ideology: Authoritarianism; Political Catholicism; Antisemitism
- Political position: Right-wing to far-right
- Religion: Catholicism

Party flag
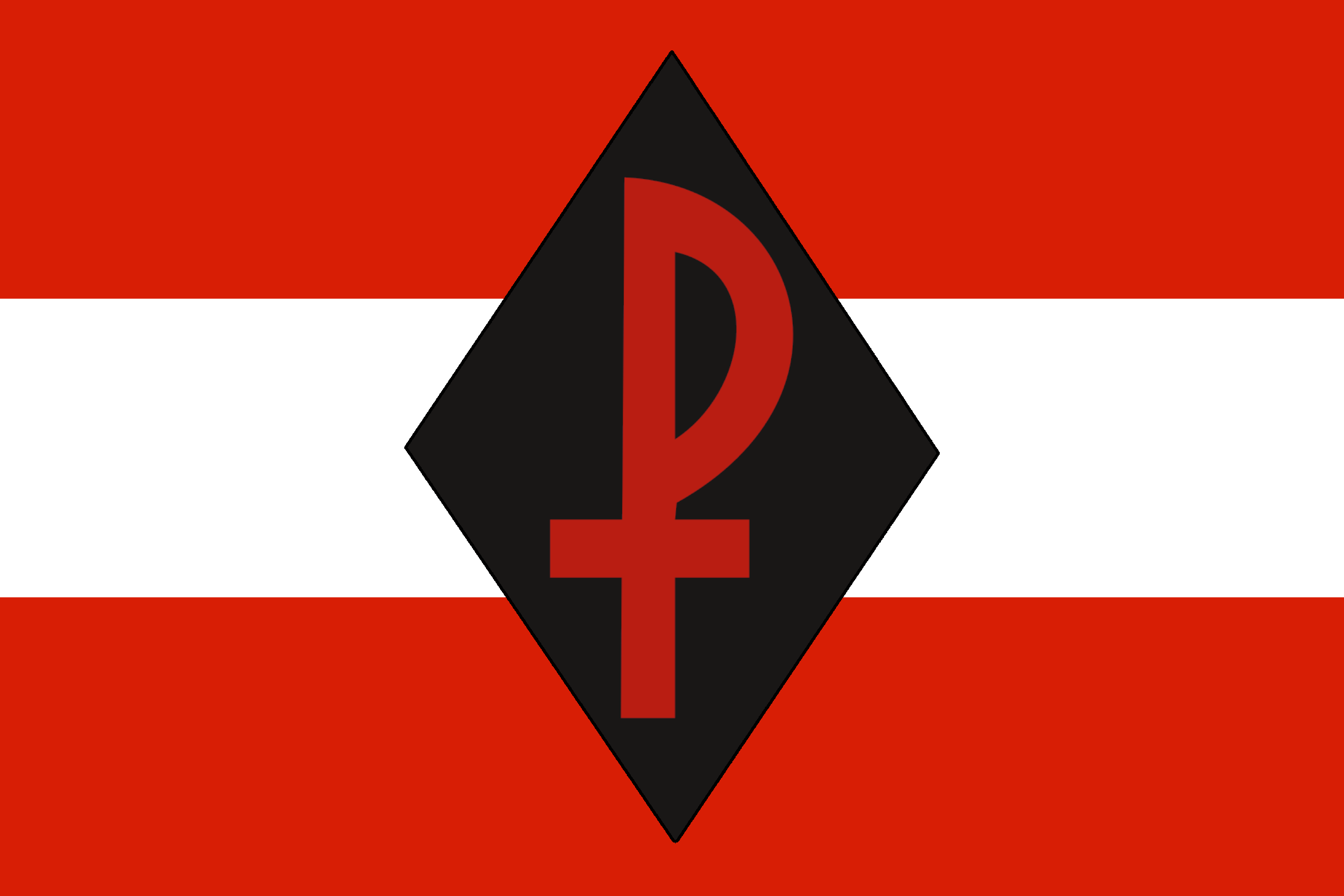

The Ostmärkische Sturmscharen (German pronunciation: [ˈɔstmɛʁkɪʃə ˈʃtʊʁmˌʃaːʁən]; 'Eastern March Stormtroopers') was a right-wing paramilitary group in Austria, founded on 7 December 1930. Recruited from the Katholische Jugend (Catholic Youth), later from journeymen and teacher organisations, it formed an opposition to both to the nationalist Heimwehr forces and the Social Democratic Republikanischer Schutzbund. The Christian Social politician Kurt Schuschnigg was its Reichsführer.

Founded in Innsbruck, Tyrol, the Ostmärkische Sturmscharen spread over the entire Austrian territory when the association's headquarters were relocated to Vienna in 1933. The organisation then comprised about 15,000 members according to their own figures, though it never became very popular. Nevertheless, in Lower Austria they incorporated the local Heimwehr and received massive support from the Austrian Bauernbund (Farmers' League) organisation. The Bauernbund chairman Leopold Figl, post-war Chancellor of Austria, acted as Lower Austrian Landesführer.

On the eve of the Austrian Civil War, the Märkische Sturmscharen increasingly adopted a Catholic clerical fascist and antisemite stance. Martial sports and military training became fundamental, and the association began to deploy paramilitary task force formations. Engelbert Dollfuss, Austrian chancellor since 1932, attempted to strengthen them as a counterweight to the radical Heimwehr forces. Sturmscharen troopers also participated in the violent suppression of the Schutzbund revolt in February 1934.

After the Federal State of Austria was established in 1934, Schuschnigg became chancellor upon Dollfuss' assassination during the Nazi July Putsch and the Austrian right-wing paramilitary forces were gradually absorbed by the Fatherland Front (Vaterländische Front, VF) unity party. On 11 April 1936, the Ostmärkische Sturmscharen declared themselves a cultural organisation, hence the final merger of all defence forces into the VF by decree of Chancellor Schuschnigg in October was for them merely a formality. After the Austrian Anschluss to Nazi Germany in 1938, some former members of the Sturmscharen engaged in resistance to Nazism.
