= Stocker government =

Austrian government since 2025

- Cabinet of Austria

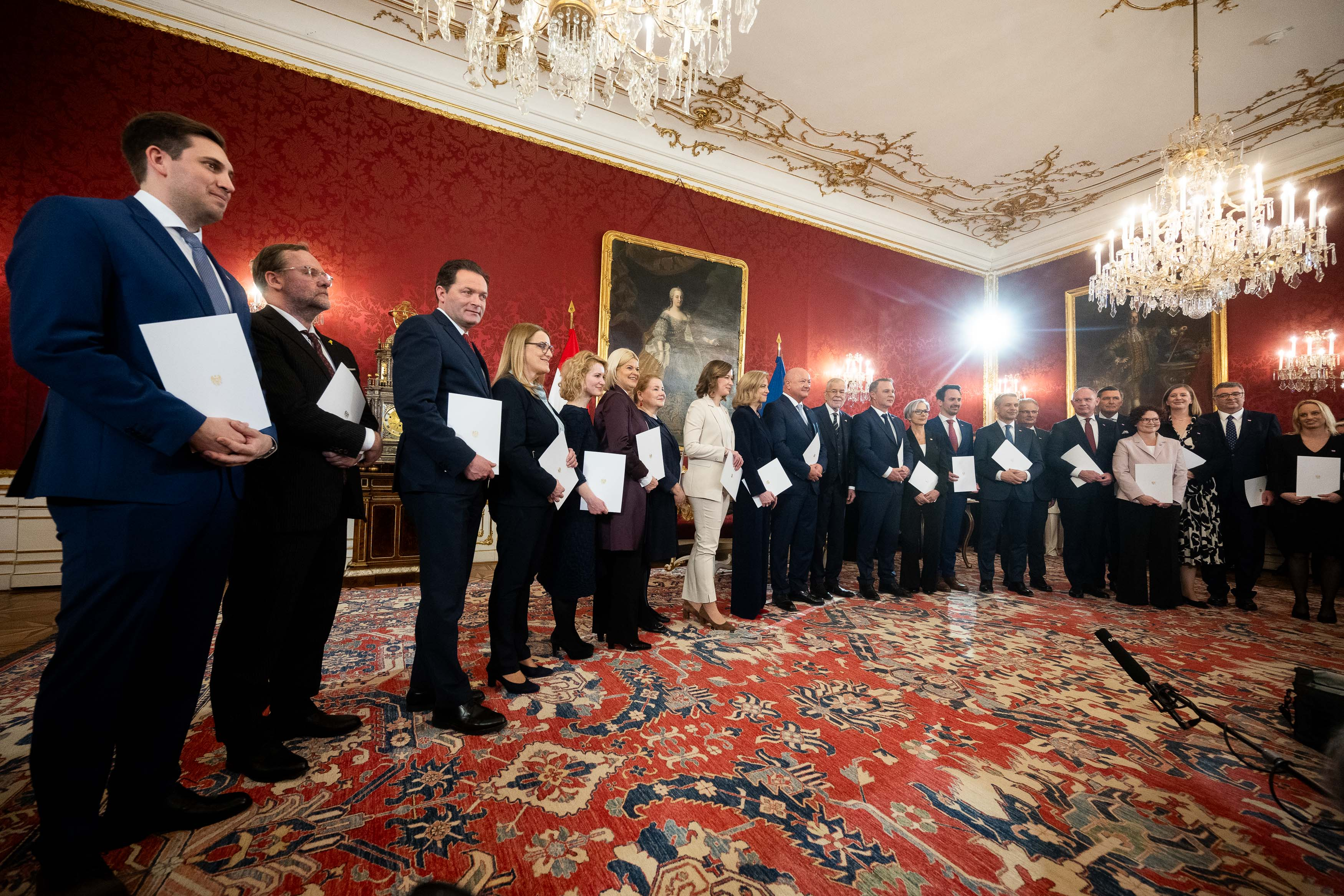
- Date formed: 3 March 2025

People and organisations
- President: Alexander Van der Bellen
- Chancellor: Christian Stocker
- Vice-Chancellor: Andreas Babler
- No. of ministers: 14 (incl. Stocker)
- Member parties: Austrian People's Party (ÖVP); Social Democratic Party of Austria (SPÖ); NEOS
- Status in legislature: Majority (coalition)
- Opposition parties: Freedom Party of Austria (FPÖ); The Greens (GRÜNE)
- Opposition leader: Herbert Kickl

History
- Election: 2024 legislative election
- Predecessor: Nehammer government (Note: Alexander Schallenberg briefly led a caretaker government between Nehammer's resignation and Stocker's inauguration.)

The Stocker government (German: Bundesregierung Stocker) was sworn in as the Government of Austria on 3 March 2025. It is headed by Chancellor Christian Stocker. It is the first tripartite coalition government in Austria since 1949.

== Cabinet ==
Portrait	Name	Office	Took office	Left office	Party	Home state
=== Chancellery ===
	Christian Stocker	Chancellor of Austria	3 March 2025		ÖVP	Lower Austria
	Andreas Babler	Vice-Chancellor of Austria; Minister for Housing, Arts, Culture, Media and Sport	3 March 2025		SPÖ	Lower Austria
=== Ministers ===
	Beate Meinl-Reisinger	Minister for European and International Affairs	3 March 2025		NEOS	Vienna
	Wolfgang Hattmannsdorfer	Minister for Economy, Energy and Tourism	3 March 2025		ÖVP	Upper Austria
	Gerhard Karner	Minister for the Interior	6 December 2021		ÖVP	Lower Austria
	Claudia Bauer	Minister for Europe, Integration and Family	3 March 2025		ÖVP	Upper Austria
	Klaudia Tanner	Minister for Defence	7 January 2020		ÖVP	Lower Austria
	Norbert Totschnig	Minister for Agriculture and Forestry, Climate and Environmental Protection, Regions and Water	18 May 2022		ÖVP	Tirol
	Peter Hanke	Minister for Innovation, Mobility and Infrastructure	3 March 2025		SPÖ	Vienna
	Eva-Maria Holzleitner	Minister for Women, Science and Research	3 March 2025		SPÖ	Upper Austria
	Korinna Schumann	Minister for Labour, Social Affairs, Health, Care and Consumer Protection	3 March 2025		SPÖ	Vienna
	Anna Sporrer	Minister for Justice	3 March 2025		SPÖ	Lower Austria
	Markus Marterbauer	Minister for Finance	3 March 2025		SPÖ	Upper Austria (born in Sweden)
	Christoph Wiederkehr	Minister for Education	3 March 2025		NEOS	Salzburg
=== State Secretaries ===
	Barbara Eibinger-Miedl	State Secretary in the Ministry of Finance	3 March 2025		ÖVP	Styria
	Alexander Pröll	State Secretary in the Chancellery	3 March 2025		ÖVP	Vienna
	Elisabeth Zehetner	State Secretary in the Ministry of Economy, Energy and Tourism	3 March 2025		ÖVP	Upper Austria
	Ulrike Königsberger-Ludwig	State Secretary in the Ministry of Labour, Social Affairs, Health, Care and Consumer Protection	3 March 2025		SPÖ	Upper Austria
	Jörg Leichtfried	State Secretary in the Ministry of Interior	3 March 2025		SPÖ	Styria
	Michaela Schmidt	State Secretary in the Ministry of Housing, Arts, Culture, Media and Sport	3 March 2025		SPÖ	Salzburg
	Sepp Schellhorn	State Secretary in the Ministry for European and International Affairs	3 March 2025		NEOS	Salzburg
