= Christian Broda =

Austrian lawyer and politician

Christian Broda (12 March 1916 in Vienna – 1 February 1987 in Vienna) was an Austrian lawyer and politician of the Social Democratic Party of Austria. He served as Minister of Justice of Austria from 1960 to 1966 in the third cabinet of Julius Raab, and again as Minister of Justice in the cabinet of Bruno Kreisky from 1970 to 1983. He was awarded the European Human Rights Prize of the Council of Europe in 1986.

== Literature ==
- Béla Rásky: "Christian Broda". In: Herbert Dachs (ed.), Die Politiker. Karrieren und Wirken bedeutender Repräsentanten der Zweiten Republik. Vienna: Manz 1995.
