= Ministry of Justice (Austria) =

Government ministry of Austria

- Bundesministerium für Justiz
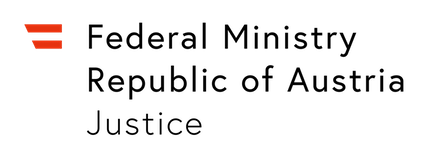

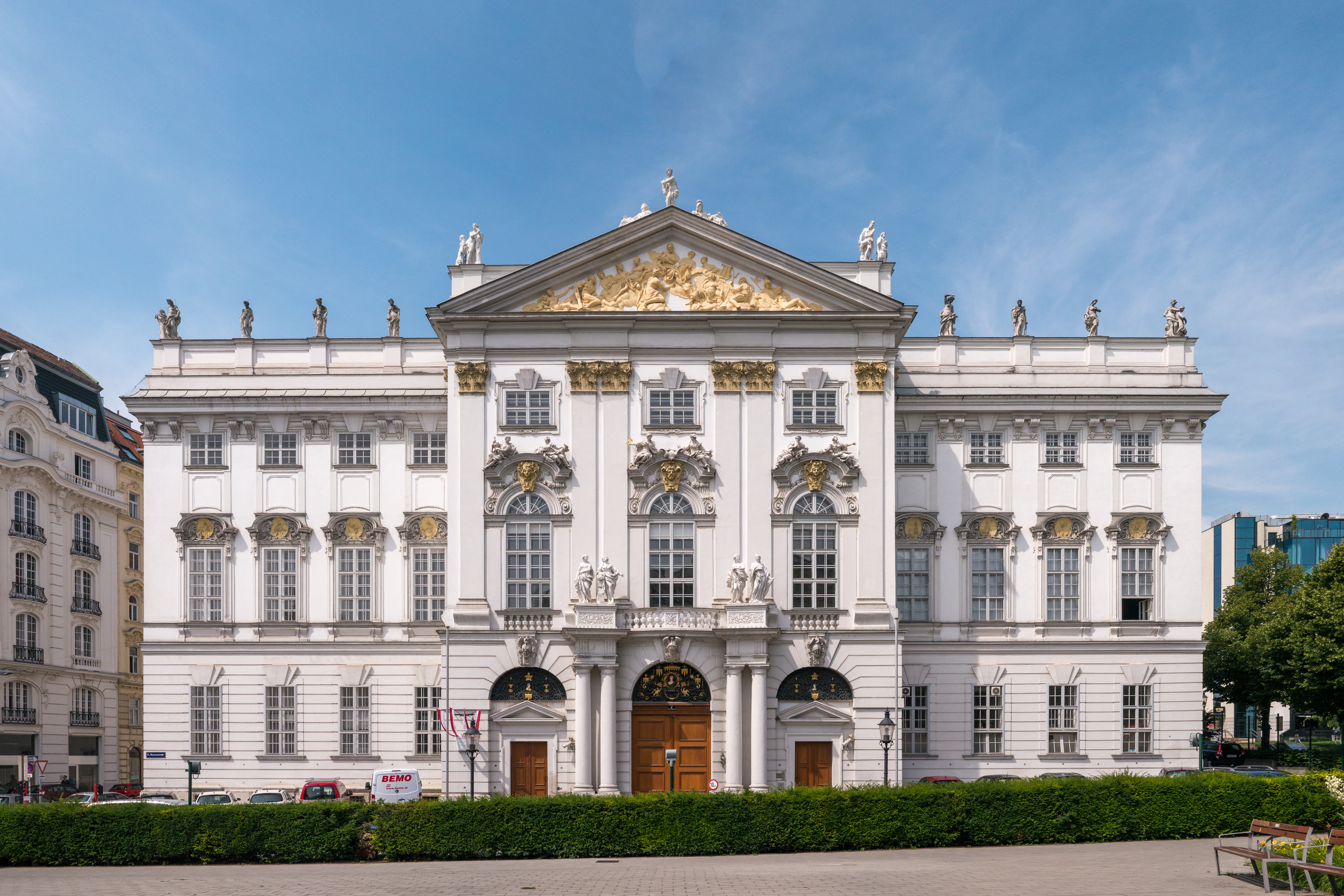

Agency overview
- Formed: 1749; 276 years ago (as Supreme Office of Justice)
- Headquarters: Palais Trautson, Museumstraße 7, Neubau, Vienna; 48°12′33″N 16°21′57″E
- Annual budget: €1,87 billion (FY 2022)
- Agency executive: Anna Sporrer, Minister
- Website: bmj.gv.at

The Ministry of Justice (German: Bundesminister für Justiz) is the government ministry of Austria responsible for the administration of justice. The ministry exercises administrative supervision and is charged with the compensation of the judiciary and the prosecutors, manages their office buildings and facilities, and administers the prison system.

The ministry is headquartered in the Palais Trautson. The current Minister of Justice is Anna Sporrer.

== History ==
First established in 1848, the ministry's exact name and portfolio have undergone changes numerous times throughout the years. From 2018 to 2020, the ministry was officially called the Ministry of Constitutional Affairs, Reforms, Deregulation and Justice (Bundesministerium für Verfassung, Reformen, Deregulierung und Justiz). In addition to its traditional responsibilities, it is tasked with supporting the Kurz cabinet's program of simplifying the country's unusually large body of constitutional law. and of reducing the amount of law on the books in general. One of its departments, the Constitutional Office (Verfassungsdienst), is the body tasked with representing the executive branch before the Constitutional Court and the Republic of Austria before the European Court of Justice and the European Court of Human Rights. The Constitutional Office also assists other ministries in drafting legislation and in evaluating the constitutionality of draft statutes prepared elsewhere. It is also in charge of the Austrian data protection agency.

== Structure ==
As of May 2018, the ministry consists of the Minister and her personal staff (Kabinett), the office of the director general, and seven departments:

- European and international affairs and protocol (Stabsstelle für Europäische und Internationale Justizangelegenheiten sowie Protokollarische Angelegenheiten)
- Public relations (Stabsstelle für Kommunikation und Öffentlichkeitsarbeit)
- Civil law (Zivilrechtssektion)
- Corrections (Generaldirektion für den Strafvollzug und den Vollzug freiheitsentziehender Maßnahmen)
- Coordination (Präsidialsektion)
- Criminal law (Strafrechtssektion)
- Constitutional Office (Verfassungsdienst)

The Minister and her staff are political appointees; the general secretary and the section heads are career civil servants.

== See also ==
- Justice ministry
- Politics of Austria
