= Timeline of Vienna =

Coordinates: 48.208333°N 16.373056°E

The following is a timeline of the history of the city of Vienna, Austria.

== Prior to 19th century ==
- c. 100 – Vindobona settled.
- 180 – Roman emperor Marcus Aurelius dies in Vindobona.
- 740 - Church of St Ruprecht, the oldest church in Vienna, first built.
- 881 – The Bavarians had their first clash at Wenia with the Hungarians (first mention of Vienna).
- 1030 – The Hungarians besiege Vienna.
- 1155
  - Henry II, Duke of Austria appoints Vienna as capital city.
  - Schottenstift founded.
- 1160 – St. Stephen's Cathedral built.
- 1221 – Vienna receives rights as staple port.
- 1237 – Vienna received a charter of freedom from Frederick II., confirmed in 1247.
- 1251 – Ottokar II of Bohemia in power.
- 1276 – Foundation stone for the Minorites Church laid by King Ottokar II of Bohemia.
- 1278 – City charter granted.
- 1280 – Jans der Enikel writes the Fürstenbuch, a first history of the city.
- 1349 – Augustinian Church consecrated.
- 1365 – University of Vienna founded.
- 1421 – Jews expelled.
- 1482 – Johann Winterburger sets up printing press (approximate date).
- 1485
  - Siege of Vienna by Kingdom of Hungary, city passed to Hungary.
  - Royal Court of King Matthias Corvinus of Hungary relocated to Vienna (known as Bécs in Hungarian).
- 1515 – First Congress of Vienna.
- 1529 – Siege of Vienna by Turks.
- 1556 – Vienna becomes seat of Holy Roman Empire under Ferdinand I.
- 1598 – Donaukanal regulated.
- 1602 – Melchior Klesl becomes Bishop of Vienna.
- 1643 – Schönbrunn Palace built.
- 1668 – July: premiere of Cesti's opera Il pomo d'oro.
- 1678 – Palais Modena completed.
- 1679 – Great Plague of Vienna.

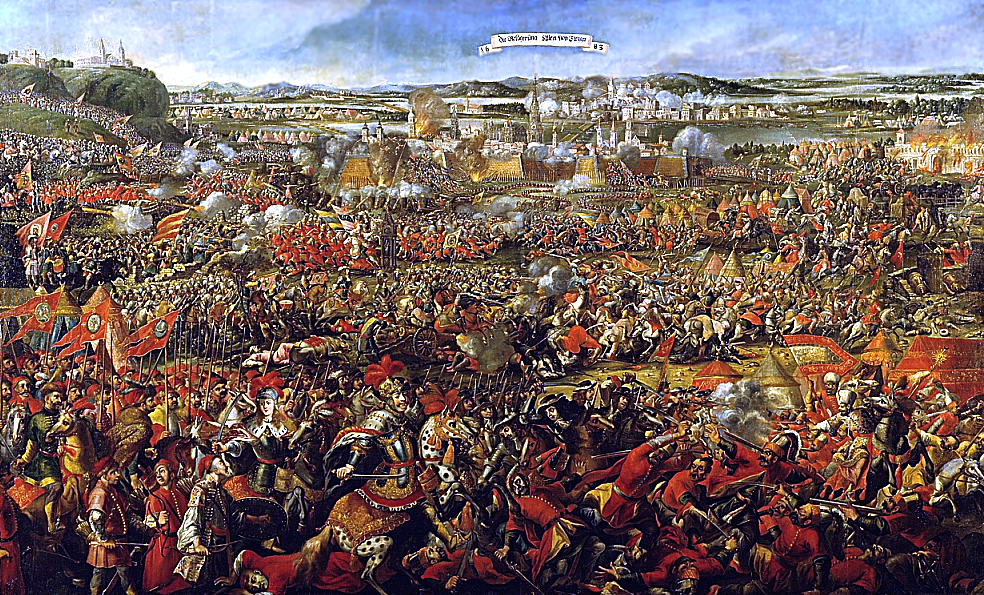
Battle of Vienna in 1683

- 1683 – Battle of Vienna.
- 1684 – Kollschitzky coffeehouse in business.
- 1692 – Academy of Fine Arts Vienna founded.
- 1702 – Palais Strozzi completed.
- 1703 – Palais Liechtenstein built.
- 1704 – Linienwall fortification built.
- 1709 – Theater am Kärntnertor built.
- 1712 – Palais Trautson completed.
- 1713 – Plague epidemic.
- 1716 – Palais Kinsky completed.
- 1718 – Vienna Porcelain Manufactory founded.
- 1724 – Population: 150,000.
- 1735 – Winter Riding School built.
- 1741 – Burgtheater opens.
- 1752 or 1765 – Schönbrunn Zoo opens.

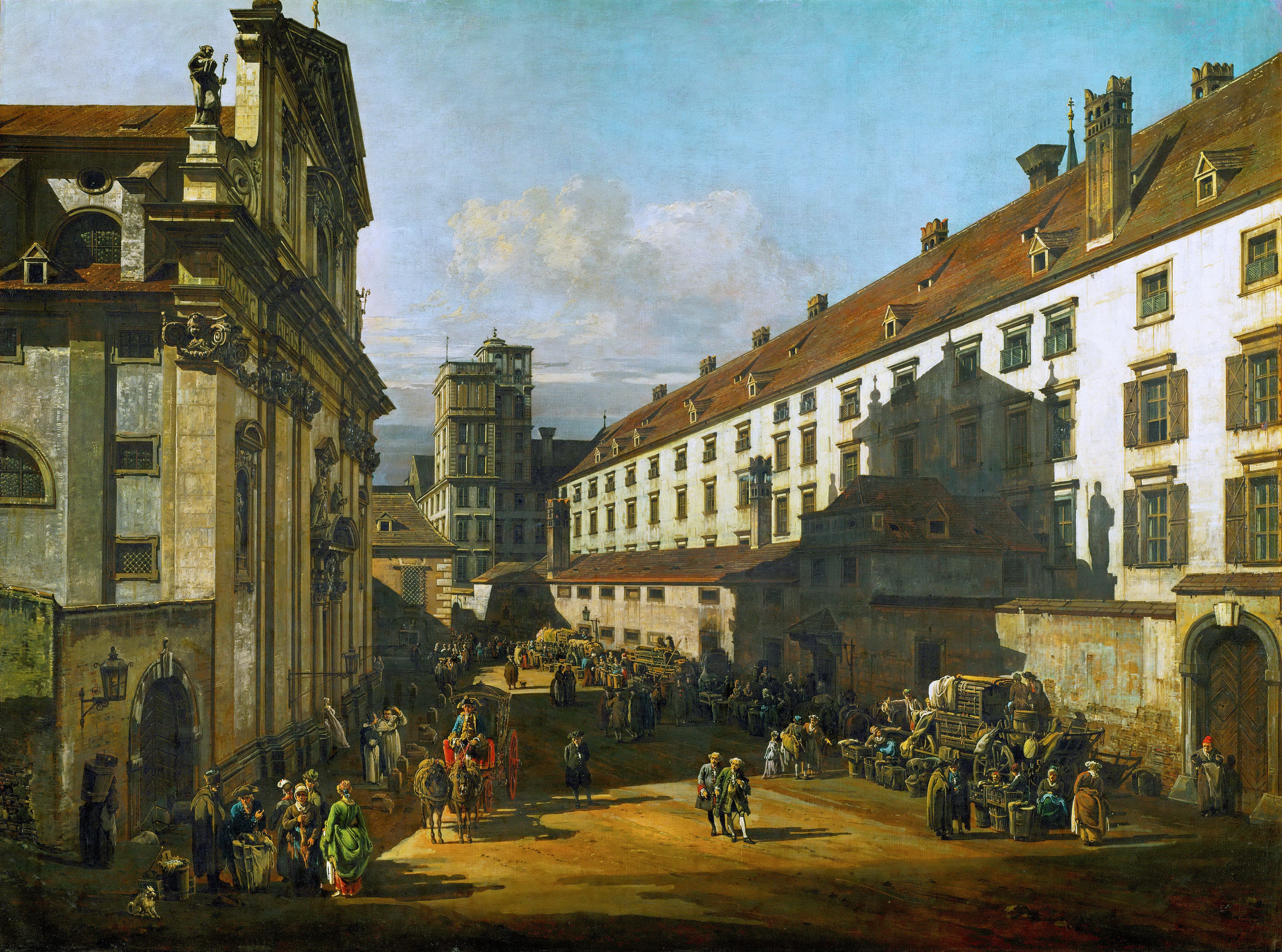
Dominican Church between 1758 and 1761 (painting by Bernardo Bellotto)

- 1762 – Premiere of Gluck's opera Orfeo ed Euridice.
- 1765 – Artaria publishing firm founded.
- 1766 – Prater opens.
- 1770 – Chess-playing Mechanical Turk introduced at Schönbrunn Palace.
- 1772 – Freyung Christmas market begins.
- 1781 – Mozart arrives to Vienna from Salzburg.
- 1786
  - Demel confectionery and Gesellschaft der Associierten founded.
  - 1 May: premiere of Mozart's opera The Marriage of Figaro.
- 1790 – Population: 200,000.
- 1791 – 30 September: premiere of Mozart's The Magic Flute. Wolfgang Amadeus Mozart dies.
- 1792 – Schweighofer piano manufactury established. Beethoven arrives to Vienna from Bonn.
- 1797 - 31 January: Franz Schubert is born in Alsergrund
- 1800 – 2 April: premiere of Beethoven's Symphony No. 1.

== 19th century ==
- 1802 – Palais Erdődy commissioned.
- 1805
  - 23 May: premiere of Beethoven's opera Fidelio.
  - 13 November: Napoleon takes city.
- 1807 – Czartoryski Palace built.
- 1808 – 22 December: premiere of Beethoven's Fifth and Sixth Symphonies, Choral Fantasy, and Piano Concerto No. 4 at the Theater an der Wien.
- 1809 – Battle of Aspern-Essling. Joseph Haydn dies.
- 1814
  - Congress of Vienna.
  - C.F. Peters music publisher in business.
- 1824 – 7 May: premiere of Beethoven's Symphony No. 9.
- 1827 – 27 March: Ludwig van Beethoven dies.
- 1828 – 19 November: Franz Peter Schubert dies.
- 1829 – Leopoldine Society formed.
- 1832 – Sachertorte invented.
- 1840 – Population: 231,050.
- 1842
  - Austrian Southern Railway begins.
  - Philharmonische Academie formed.
- 1847 – Austrian Academy of Sciences established.

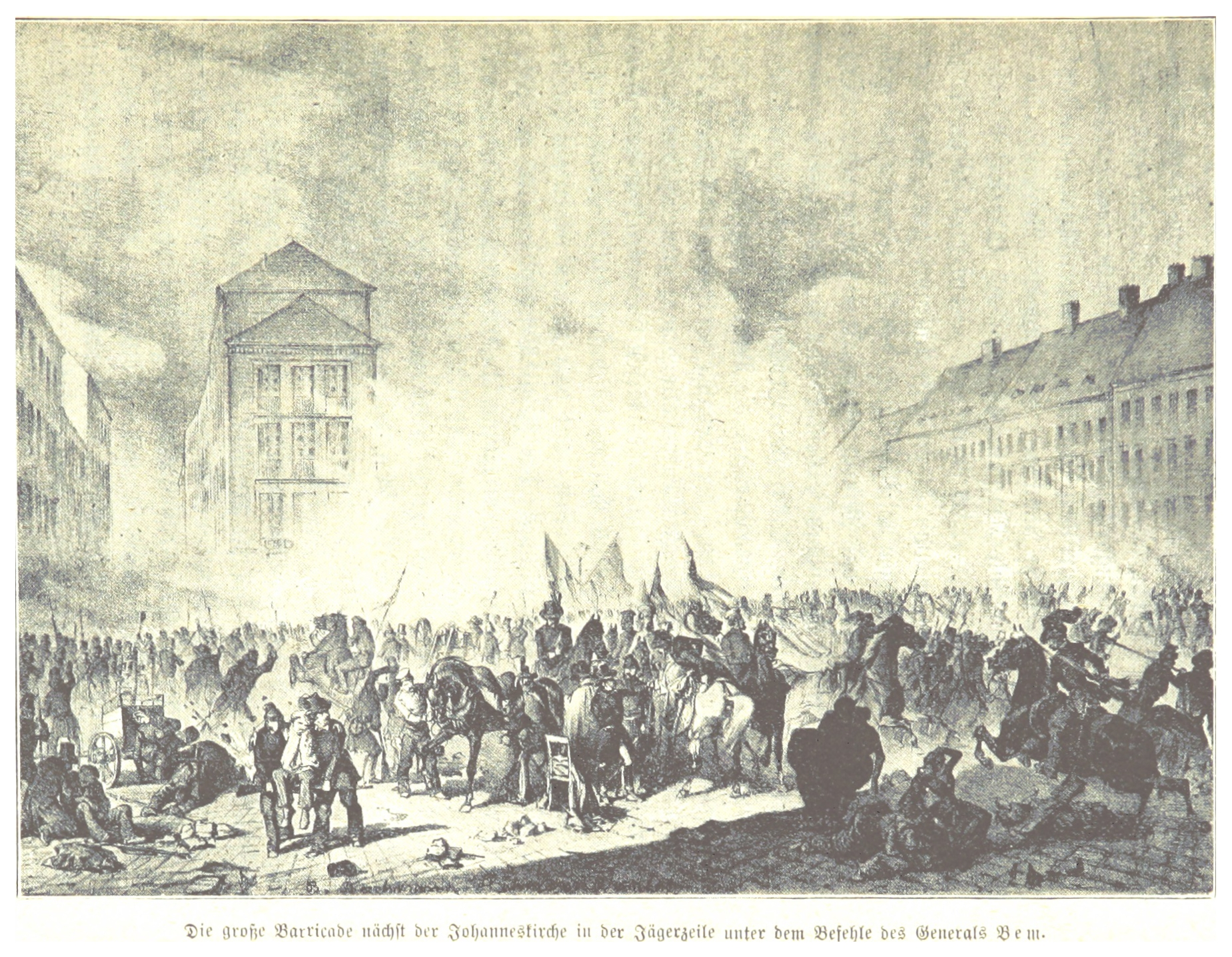
Vienna Uprising in 1848

- 1848 – Vienna Uprising.
- 1850
  - City expanded beyond Innere Stadt.
  - Population: 551,300.
- 1858 – Vienna Ring Road constructed.
- 1860/1864 – the fine and lofty tower of the Cathedral of St Stephen rebuilt.
- 1864
  - Palais Todesco completed.
  - Neue Freie Presse newspaper begins publication.
- 1867 – Palais Toskana built.
- 1869
  - Vienna State Opera house built.
  - Population: 842,951.
- 1870
  - Works started to regulate the Danube to make it safe for navigation.
  - Musikverein inaugurated.
- 1873
  - World exposition held.
  - Café Landtmann and Hotel Imperial in business.
- 1874
  - Palais Chotek completed.
  - Premiere of Strauss's opera Die Fledermaus.
- 1875 – Danube levees constructed.
- 1876
  - Academy of Fine Arts building erected.
  - Hotel Sacher established.
  - Café Central in business.
- 1878 – Palais Nathaniel Rothschild built.
- 1879 – Geological Survey of Austria formed.
- 1880
  - Café Sperl in business.
  - Population: 1,090,119.
- 1881 – Palace of Justice, Vienna built.
- 1882 – Palmenhaus Schönbrunn (greenhouse) opens.
- 1883 – Completion of the Vienna City Hall, an immense Gothic building.
- 1884 – Palais Albert Rothschild built.
- 1885 – Goldscheider Manufactory and Majolica Factory and Alpinen Gesellschaft Edelraute (hiking club) established.
- 1886 – Hermesvilla built.
- 1887 – Historical Museum of the City of Vienna established.
- 1889 – Vienna City Archives active.

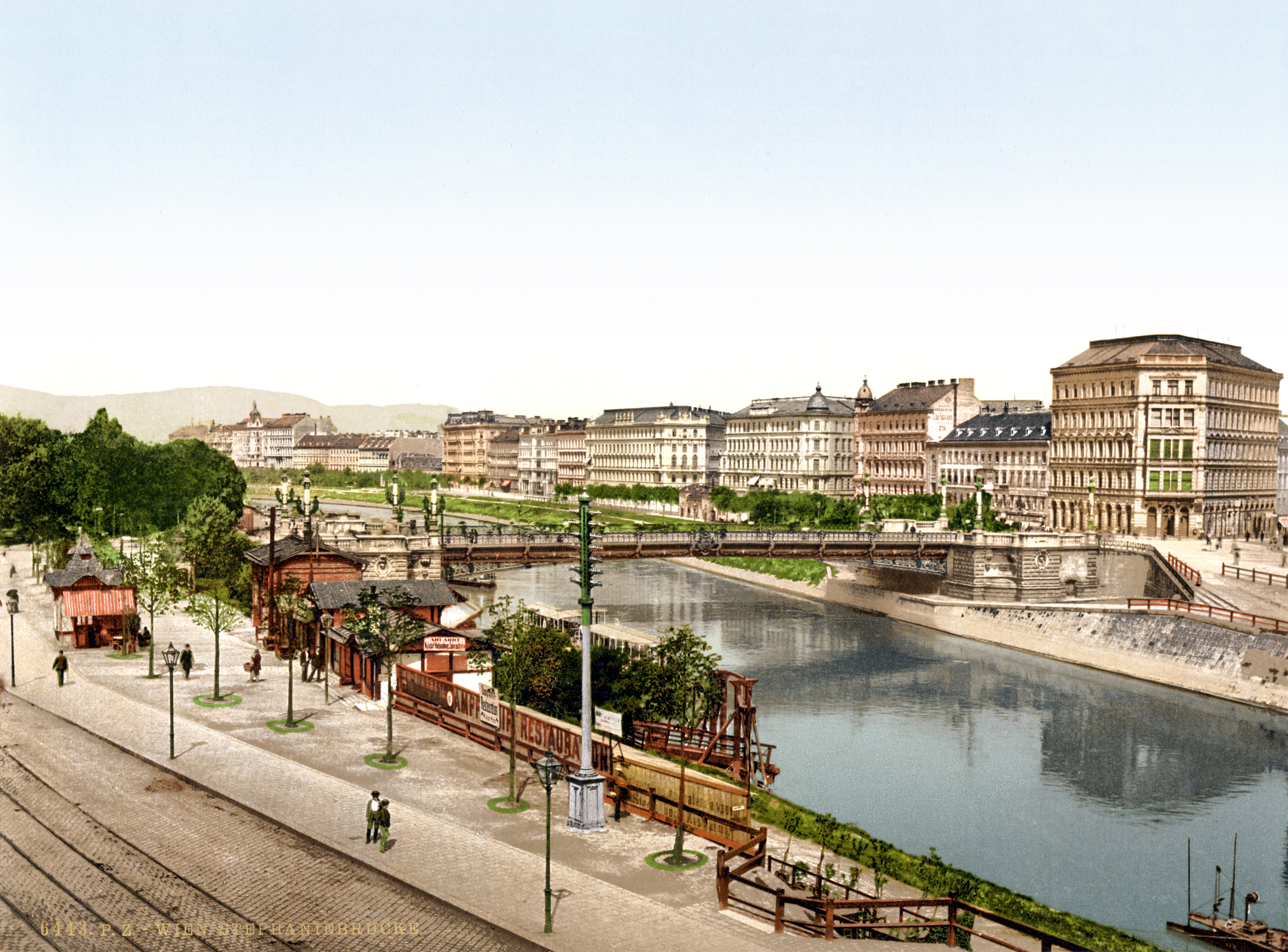
Late-19th-century view of the city

- 1890 – City expanded; population: 1,364,548.
- 1891 – Kunsthistorisches Museum (art museum) opens.
- 1892 – City hosts the 1892 European Figure Skating Championships.
- 1894
  - January: city hosts the 1894 European Figure Skating Championships.
  - Palais Rothschild (Prinz-Eugen-Straße) built.
- 1895 – Palais Lanckoroński completed.
- 1897
  - Wiener Riesenrad erected.
  - April: Vienna Secession art group founded.
- 1898
  - Vienna Stadtbahn begins.
  - Secession Building constructed.
  - City hosts the 1898 ICA Track Cycling World Championships.
- 1899
  - 4 November: Freud's The Interpretation of Dreams published.
  - Die Fackel magazine begins publication.
- 1900 – Population: 1,769,137.

== 20th century ==
=== 1900s–1940s ===
- 1901 – Universal Edition in business.
- 1902
  - Freudenau harbor constructed.
  - Franciszek Trześniewski opens restaurant.
- 1903
  - Kuchelau harbor constructed.
  - Wiener Werkstätte art group founded.
- 1904
  - Floridsdorf district added.
  - Café Korb in business.
- 1907 – City hosts the 1907 World Figure Skating Championships.
- 1908 – Vienna Psychoanalytic Society active.
- 1910 – Population: 2,031,000.
- 1911 – Vienna inflation riot
- 1912 – Aspern Airfield opens.
- 1913
  - 23 February: premiere of Schoenberg's Gurre-Lieder.
  - Richard Weiskirchner becomes mayor.
- 1915 – April: Conference of Central European Socialist Parties held in Vienna.

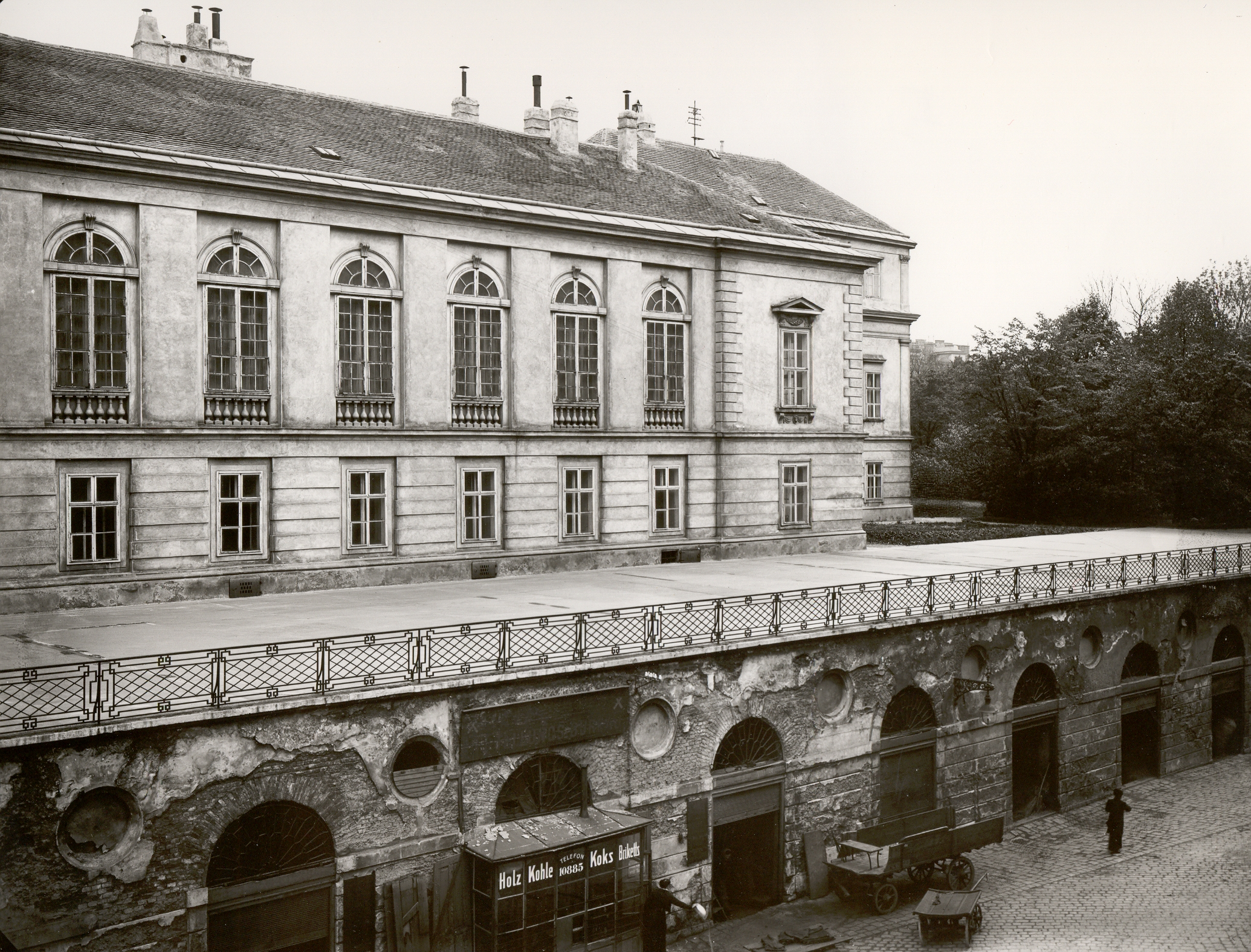
Palais Modena in 1916

- 1916 – 30 November: funeral of Franz Joseph I of Austria.
- 1918 – Red Vienna begins.
- 1919
  - Lainzer Tiergarten opens.
  - Jakob Reumann becomes mayor.
- 1920
  - Austrian National Library established.
  - Hungarian Historical Institute in Vienna founded.
- 1921
  - The Geistkreis seminar begins.
  - Österreichische Bundesgärten (garden) established.
  - International Working Union of Socialist Parties founded in Vienna.
- 1923
  - Karl Seitz becomes mayor.
  - Phaidon Press founded.
- 1924 – Collegium Hungaricum Vienna founded.
- 1925 – Kolosseum (cinema) opens.
- 1929 – Austrian Bridge Federation founded.
- 1931 – Ernst-Happel-Stadion built.
- 1934 – Richard Schmitz becomes mayor.

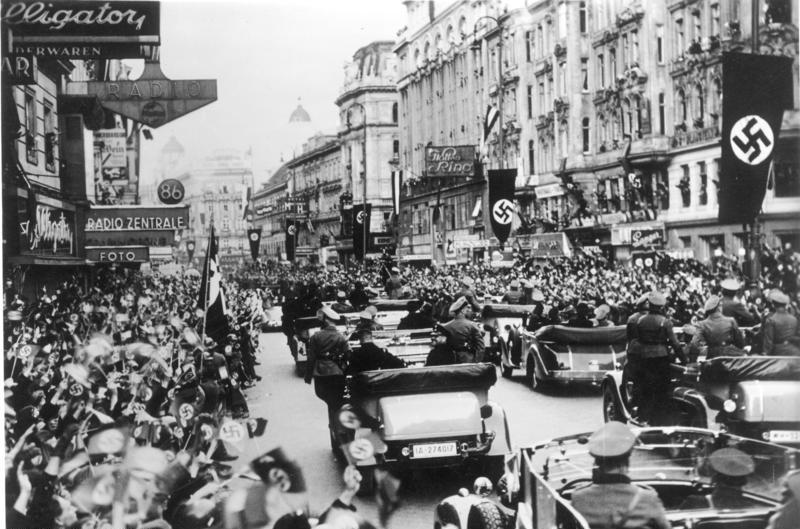
Anschluss in 1938

- 1938
  - Anschluss.
  - Hermann Neubacher becomes mayor.
  - City expands.
- 1940 – Philipp Wilhelm Jung becomes mayor.
- 1941 – Kehal Adas Yereim Vien established.
- 1942 – Bombing begins.
- 1943
  - 30 August: Vienna-Schwechat (Heidfeld) subcamp of the Mauthausen concentration camp established. Its prisoners were mostly Polish, Soviet, Italian and Spanish.
  - 30 December: Hanns Blaschke becomes mayor.
- 1944
  - Vienna-Schwechat ('Santa') subcamp of Mauthausen established.
  - 13 July: Vienna-Schwechat (Heidfeld) subcamp dissolved, Vienna-Floridsdorf subcamp of Mauthausen established. Prisoners moved from Schwechat (Heidfeld) to Floridsdorf.
  - 20 August: Vienna-Saurerwerke subcamp of Mauthausen established. Its prisoners were mostly Poles and Soviet citizens.
  - September: Vienna-Hinterbrühl subcamp of Mauthausen established. Its prisoners were mostly Polish, Soviet and Italian.
  - 28 September: Vienna-Schönbrunn subcamp of Mauthausen established.
- 1945
  - Vienna Offensive.
  - 31 March: Vienna-Schwechat ('Santa') subcamp dissolved. Prisoners moved to the Hinterbrühl subcamp.
  - 1 April: Floridsdorf, Hinterbrühl and Schönbrunn subcamps dissolved. Prisoners are evacuated by the SS in death marches to the Steyr-Münichholz subcamp and main Mauthausen camp. Massacre of 52 Hinterbrühl prisoners, who were unable to walk.
  - 2 April: Vienna-Saurerwerke subcamp dissolved. Prisoners are evacuated by the SS in a death march to the Steyr-Münichholz subcamp, except for ill prisoners who are left behind.
  - Allied-occupied city.
  - Rudolf Prikryl becomes mayor, succeeded by Theodor Körner.
  - Soviet War Memorial installed.
- 1948 – Italian Cultural Institute in Vienna founded.

=== 1950s–1990s ===
- 1951
  - March: city hosts the 1951 World Table Tennis Championships.
  - Franz Jonas becomes mayor.
- 1952 – City hosts the 1952 European Figure Skating Championships.
- 1954
  - Vienna International Airport opens.
  - Flood.
- 1955 – City hosts the 1955 World Figure Skating Championships.
- 1957
  - February: city hosts the 1957 European Figure Skating Championships.
  - International Atomic Energy Agency headquartered in Vienna.
- 1958 – Freudenauer Harbour Bridge built.

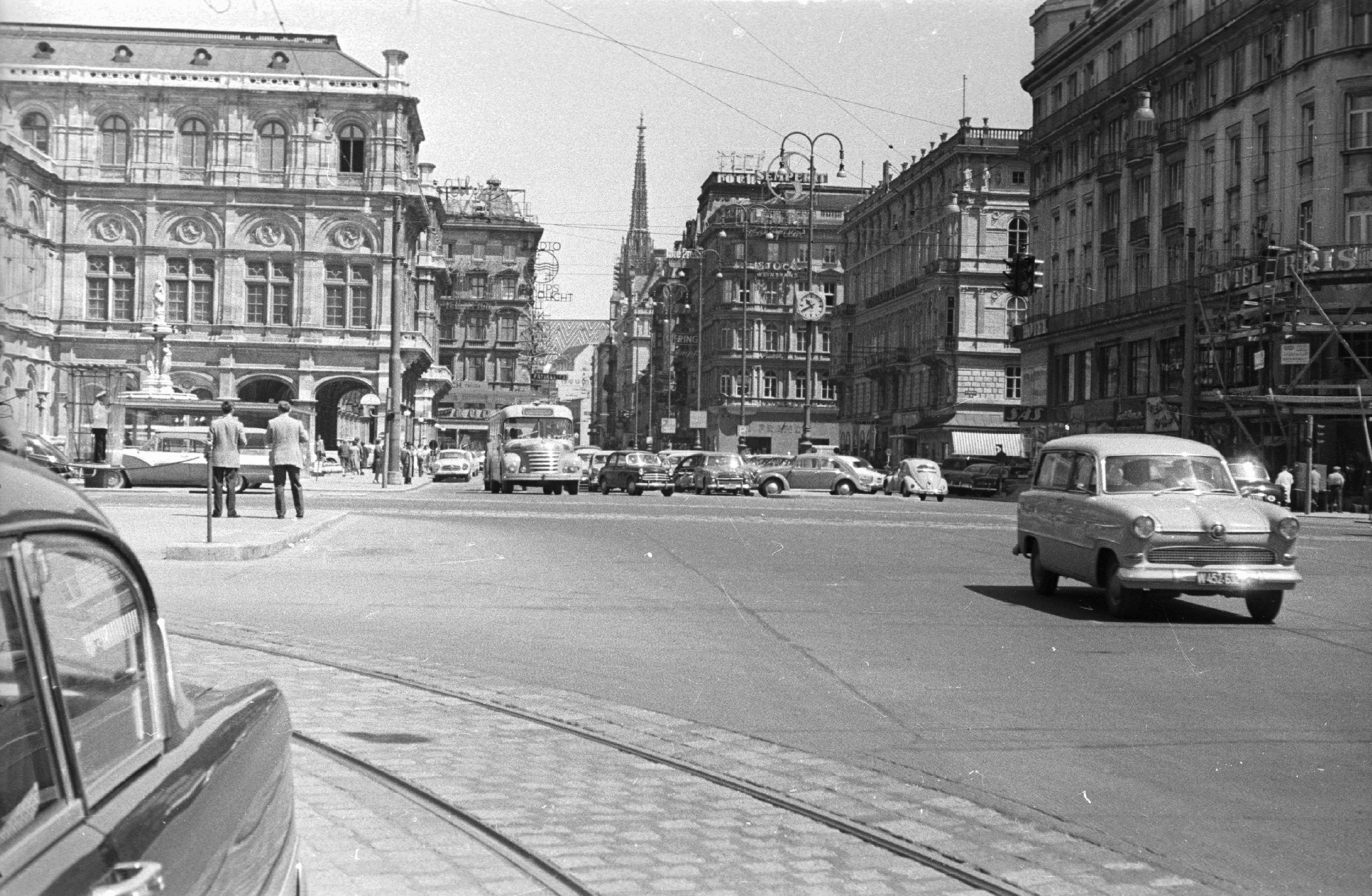
Vienna in 1959

- 1959
  - Vienna Museum opens.
  - City hosts World Festival of Youth and Students.
- 1960 – Österreichische Mediathek (sound archive) headquartered in city.
- 1961 – Vienna summit of USA and USSR.
- 1962 – Vienna S-Bahn begins.
- 1964 – Österreichisches Filmmuseum established.
- 1965 – Bruno Marek becomes mayor.
- 1967
  - February–March: city hosts the 1967 World Figure Skating Championships.
  - March: city hosts the 1967 Ice Hockey World Championships.
  - City hosts the Eurovision Song Contest 1967.
- 1968 – Austrian Science Fund formed.
- 1969 – OPEC Headquarter moves from Geneva, Switzerland to Vienna.
- 1970 – Felix Slavik becomes mayor.
- 1971 – City hosts the 1971 World Fencing Championships.
- 1973 – Leopold Gratz becomes mayor.
- 1974 – Polish Institute in Vienna founded.

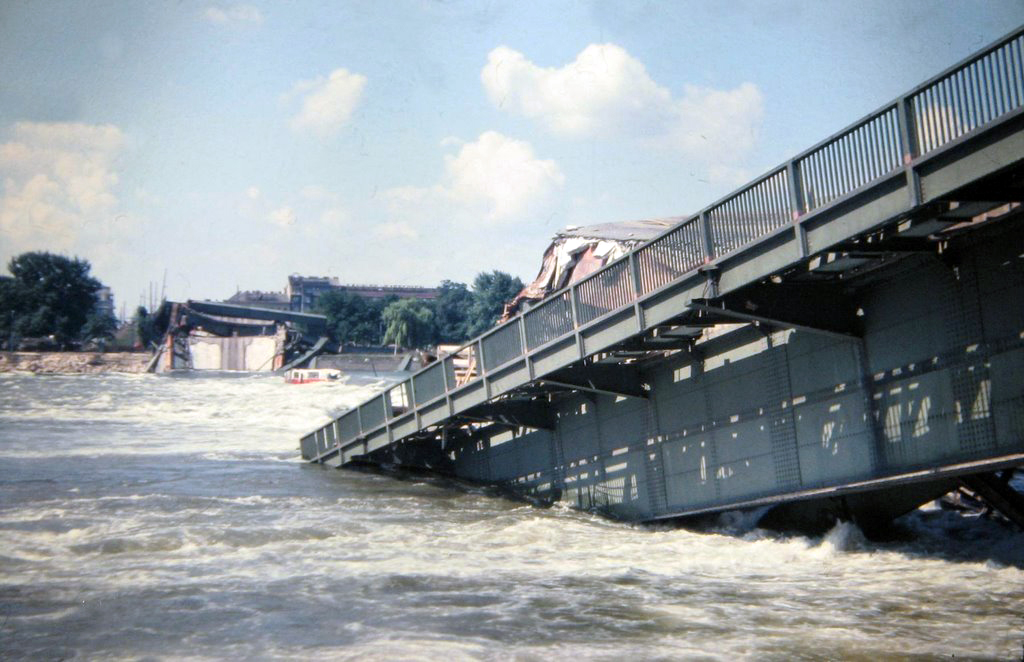
Reichsbrücke collapse in 1976

- 1976
  - 8 May: Vienna U-Bahn opens.
  - 1 August: Reichsbrücke collapse.
- 1977 – City hosts the 1977 Ice Hockey World Championships.
- 1979
  - March: city hosts the 1979 World Figure Skating Championships.
  - Vienna Islamic Centre and UNO City built.
- 1983
  - July: city hosts the 1983 World Fencing Championships.
  - Donauinselfest begins.
- 1984 – Helmut Zilk becomes mayor.
- 1985
  - Airport attack.
  - Institute of Technology Assessment founded.
- 1988
  - New Danube channel constructed.
  - ImPulsTanz Vienna International Dance Festival begins.
- 1990 – Museum in Progress created.
- 1991 – City hosts the 1991 World Rowing Championships.
- 1992 – The biggest AIDS charity event in Europe, the Life Ball begins.
- 1993 – World Conference on Human Rights held.
- 1994
  - Czech Centre in Vienna founded.
  - Michael Häupl becomes mayor.
- 1995 – Secretariat for the Organization for Security and Co-operation in Europe established.
- 1996 – City hosts the 1996 Men's Ice Hockey World Championships.
- 1998 – Andromeda-Tower built.
- 1999 – Millennium Tower built.
- 2000
  - City website online (approximate date).
  - Mischek Tower built.

== 21st century ==
- 2001 – IZD Tower and Ares Tower built.
- 2003 – Lighthouse Wien founded.
- 2004 – Saturn Tower built.
- 2005 – City co-hosts the 2005 IIHF World Championship.
- 2007 – EU Fundamental Rights Agency established.
- 2008
  - World Institute for Nuclear Security headquartered in city.
  - UEFA European Football Championship held.
- 2010 – Wiener Staatsballet formed.
- 2011
  - Smart City Wien begins.
  - Funeral of Otto von Habsburg.
- 2014 – Population: 1,797,337.
- 2015 – City hosts the Eurovision Song Contest 2015.
- 2020 – The Vienna attack occurs.
- 2026 – City hosts the Eurovision Song Contest 2026.

== See also ==
- History of Vienna
- History of the Jews in Vienna
- List of mayors of Vienna
- Vienna History Wiki
- Years in Austria
- Timelines of other cities in Austria: Graz, Linz, Salzburg

== Bibliography ==
=== in English ===
published in the 18th-19th century

- Thomas Nugent (1749), "Vienna", The Grand Tour, vol. 2: Germany and Holland, London: S. Birt, hdl:2027/mdp.39015030762572
- William Hunter (1803), "(Vienna)", Travels through France, Turkey, and Hungary, to Vienna, in 1792, vol. 2, London: J. White, OCLC 10321359
- Jedidiah Morse; Richard C. Morse (1823), "Vienna", A New Universal Gazetteer (4th ed.), New Haven: S. Converse
- John Russell (1828), "Vienna", A Tour in Germany, and Some of the Southern Provinces of the Austrian Empire, in 1820, 1821, 1822, Edinburgh: Constable, OCLC 614379840
- David Brewster, ed. (1832). "Vienna". Edinburgh Encyclopædia. Philadelphia: Joseph and Edward Parker. hdl:2027/uc2.ark:/13960/t3dz0hq2k.
- Frances Trollope (1838), Vienna and the Austrians, London: R. Bentley, OCLC 2431804 + v.2
- Mariana Starke (1839), "Vienna", Travels in Europe (9th ed.), Paris: A. and W. Galignani
- John Thomson (1845), "Vienna", New Universal Gazetteer and Geographical Dictionary, London: H.G. Bohn
- A.A. Paton (1861). "Vienna". Researches on the Danube and the Adriatic. Leipzig: Brockhaus. hdl:2027/hvd.32044017982406.
- "Vienna", Handbook for Travellers in Southern Germany (9th ed.), London: John Murray, 1863
- "Vienna". Bradshaw's Illustrated Hand-book to Germany. London: W.J. Adams & Sons. 1867.
- 'The Graphic' Guide to Vienna, London: Office of The Graphic, 1873, OL 24225739M
- David Kay (1880), "Principal Towns: Vienna", Austria-Hungary, Foreign Countries and British Colonies, London: Sampson Low, Marston, Searle, & Rivington, hdl:2027/mdp.39015030647005
- The Newest Plan and Guide of Vienna and Environs, Vienna: R. Lechner, 1891, OL 19356630M
- Norddeutscher Lloyd (1896), "Vienna", Guide through Germany, Austria-Hungary, Italy, Switzerland, France, Belgium, Holland and England, Berlin: J. Reichmann & Cantor, OCLC 8395555

published in the 20th century

- Robert C. Brooks (1901), "Vienna", Bibliography of Municipal Problems and City Conditions, Municipal Affairs, vol. 5 (2nd ed.), New York: Reform Club, OCLC 1855351
- Maria Hornor Lansdale (1902), Vienna and the Viennese, Philadelphia: H. T. Coates & Co., OCLC 1522879, OL 6920560M
- "Vienna", Jewish Encyclopedia, vol. 12, New York, 1907, hdl:2027/osu.32435029752839
- "Vienna" . Encyclopædia Britannica. Vol. 28 (11th ed.). 1910. pp. 50–53.
- Donald Olsen (1986). The City as a Work of Art: London, Paris, Vienna. Yale University Press. ISBN 9780300042122.
- Peter Csendes (1999). "Chronology". Historical Dictionary of Vienna. Scarecrow Press. ISBN 978-0-8108-3562-7.

published in the 21st century

- John W. Stamper (2004). "The Industry Palace of the 1873 World's Fair: Karl von Hasenauer, John Scott Russell, and New Technology in Nineteenth-Century Vienna". Architectural History. 47: 227–250. doi:10.1017/S0066622X00001763. JSTOR 1568823.
- Jens S. Dangschat & Alexander Hamedinger (2009). "Planning culture in Austria: the case of Vienna, the unlike city". In Jörg Knieling & Frank Othengrafen (eds.). Planning Cultures in Europe: Decoding Cultural Phenomena in Urban and Regional Planning. Ashgate. ISBN 978-0-7546-7565-5.

=== in German ===
- Karl Friedrich Arnold von Lützow (1876), Wiener Neubauten [Viennese Buildings] (in German), Wien: Lehmann & Wentzel, OCLC 17857346, OL 6565936M
- Moritz Bermann (1880), Alt- und Neu-Wien: Geschichte der Kaiserstadt und ihrer Umgebungen [Old and New Vienna: History of the Imperial City and its Surroundings], A. Hartleben, OCLC 11359182, OL 23423601M
- Eugen Guglia (1892), Geschichte der Stadt Wien [History of the City of Vienna] (in German), Wien: F. Tempsky, OL 23360656M
