= List of honorary citizens of Vienna =

The freeman of the city award (Ehrenbürgerrecht) is the highest decoration of the city of Vienna. It can also be revoked. Since 1839, initiated by mayor Ignaz Czapka, recipients have been listed in the honorary citizenship book, although a few are missing. The recipients also receive an official diploma

The following list is ordered according to the year of bestowal:

- Francis Rawdon (14 February 1797)
- Friedrich Ernst Graf Marschall (14 February 1797)
- Gottfried Freiherr van Swieten (14 February 1797)
- Ferdinand (Württemberg) (17 May 1797)
- Jakob Freiherr von Wöber (17 May 1797)
- Franz Josef Graf Saurau (17 May 1797)
- Joseph Graf Pergen (30 May 1797)
- Prokop Graf Lazansky von Bukowa (30 May 1797)
- Joseph Karl Graf Dietrichstein (30 May 1797)
- Johann Ferdinand Graf Kuefstein (30 May 1797)
- Johann Baptist Ritter von Lampi (18 June 1799)
- Anton Friedrich Graf Mittrowsky von Mitrowitz und Nemyschl (17 October 1801)
- Joseph Freiherr von Kielmannsegg (17 October 1801)
- Peter Anton Freiherr von Braun (28 December 1802)
- Joseph Ritter Girtler von Kleeborn (16 December 1803)
- Johann Ferdinand Hetzendorf von Hohenberg (15 February 1804)
- Joseph Haydn (1 April 1804)
- Vincenz Peter Anton Guldener von Lobes (4 January 1805)
- Louis Joseph Montoyer (25 September 1805)
- Rudolf Graf Wrbna von Freudenthal (16 January 1806)
- Joseph von Sonnenfels (11 November 1806)
- Leopold Ignaz Freiherr von Haan (15 November 1809)
- Ferdinand Graf von Bissingen und Nippenburg (2 January 1810)
- August Freiherr von Reichmann von Hochkirchen (2 January 1810)
- Ferdinand Freiherr Fechtig von Fechtenberg (4 May 1810)
- Philipp Graf Edling (6 October 1810)
- Heinrich Joseph Watteroth (1810)
- Joseph Preindl (12 August 1813)
- Klemens Wenzel Lothar von Metternich (24 October 1813)
- Karl Fürst zu Schwarzenberg (24 October 1813)
- Ludwig van Beethoven (1815)
- Bernhard Joseph Ritter Anders von Porodim (16 May 1816)
- Johann Sartory (22 May 1818)
- Joseph Seipelt (23 April 1829)
- Johann Christian Schiffner (22 September 1834)
- Ignaz Franz Castelli (5 February 1835)
- Leopold Ritter von Prosky (10 March 1836)
- Franz Anton Graf Kolowarat-Liebsteinsky (2 April 1839)
- Johann Talatzko Freiherr von Gestieticz (12 February 1840)
- Johann Joseph Knolz (10 December 1840)
- Joseph Freiherr von Spaun (18 May 1841)
- Maximilian Freiherr von Wimpffen (8 July 1841)
- Joseph Graf Sedlnitzky von Choltic (24 March 1842)
- Anton Gilbert Edler von Seydel (6 July 1842)
- Paul Sprenger (24 October 1842)
- Josef Baumgartner (24 October 1842)
- Franz Graf Hartig (15 November 1842)
- Salomon Mayer Freiherr von Rothschild (9 February 1843)
- Bartholomäus Graf Stürmer (14 April 1843)
- Karl Graf Inzaghi (20 April 1843)
- Franz Freiherr von Pillersdorf (20 April 1843)
- Franz Seraphim Graf Kuefstein (4 July 1843)
- Georg Graf Erdödy von Monyorókerék (7 November 1843)
- Ferdinand Leopold Graf Pálffy-Daun ab Erdöd (14 May 1844)
- Franz Buffa Freiherr von Lilienberg und Castellalt (4 August 1845)
- Johann Freiherr Krticzka von Jaden (30 August 1845)
- Johann Josef Prechtl (9 November 1846)
- Ludwig von Schwanthaler (3 February 1847)
- Adam Freiherr von Burg (20 May 1847)
- Anselm Salomon Freiherr von Rothschild (2 August 1847)
- Johann Adolf Fürst zu Schwarzenberg (26 February 1848)
- Johann Josef Wenzel Radetzky Graf von Radetz (7 August 1848)
- Josef Graf Jellacic von Buzim (4 September 1849)
- Julius Freiherr von Haynau (4 September 1849)
- Franz Joseph, Prince of Dietrichstein (25 January 1850)
- Felix Furst zu Schwarzenberg (7 January 1851)
- Maximilian Graf O'Donnell von Tyrconell (19 February 1853)
- Heinrich von Heß (18 December 1855)
- Karl Ferdinand Graf Buol-Schauenstein (29 April 1856)
- Karl Freiherr von Krauß (8 April 1859)
- Johann Freiherr von Kempen von Fichtenstamm (4 November 1859)
- Ludwig Benedek von Felsö-Eör (4 November 1859)
- Franz Freiherr von Sommaruga (18 July 1860)
- Anton Ritter von Schmerling (8 March 1861)
- Karl Wilhelm Fürst von Auersperg (18 February 1862)
- Franz Freiherr von Hein (18 February 1862)
- Franz Grillparzer (29 December 1863)
- Anastasius Grün (8 April 1864)
- Ludwig Freiherr von Gablenz (22 November 1864)
- Josef Fürst Colloredo-Mansfeld (25 January 1867)
- Friedrich Ferdinand Graf Beust (21 December 1867)
- Matthias Constantin Graf Wickenburg (18 January 1870)
- Karl Giskra (15 September 1870)
- Eduard Suess (17 October 1873)
- Ernst Karl von Hoyos-Sprinzenstein (17 October 1873)
- Karl Freiherr von Rokitansky (8 January 1874)
- Josef Hyrtl (17 March 1874)
- Franz Ritter von Khunn (4 February 1875)
- Josef Ritter von Führich (12 February 1875)
- Georg Sigl (11 February 1876)
- Josef Klucky (29 August 1876)
- Cajetan Freiherr von Felder (5 July 1878)
- Heinrich Freiherr von Ferstel (21 April 1879)
- Ignaz Kuranda (22 March 1881)
- Adolf Ignaz Ritter von Mautner-Markhof (24 June 1881)
- Eduard von Bauernfeld (22 May 1882)
- Friedrich Freiherr von Schmidt (6 September 1883)
- Hans Graf Wilczek (11 September 1883)
- Theophil Freiherr von Hansen (21 December 1883)
- Rudolf Eitelberger von Edelberg (3 March 1885)
- Anton Freiherr Hye von Glunek (25 May 1886)
- Alfred Ritter von Arneth (10 June 1887)
- Leopold Ritter von Hasner von Artner (25 June 1889)
- Ludwig Lobmeyr (25 July 1889)
- Eduard Ritter von Uhl (14 November 1889)
- Nikolaus Dumba (25 July 1890)
- Karl Lueger (3 July 1900)
- Heinrich Ritter von Wittek (5 May 1905)
- Aloys von und zu Liechtenstein (23 November 1906)
- Richard Graf von Bienerth-Schmeling (28 March 1916)
- Richard Weiskirchner (2 May 1916)
- Ottokar Graf Czernin von Chudenitz (2 May 1918)
- Jakob Reumann (21 December 1923)
- Franz Klein (11 April 1924)
- Richard Strauss (16 May 1924)
- Karl Seitz (6 September 1929)
- Leopold Kunschak (8 November 1946)
- Theodor Körner (23 April 1948)
- Karl Renner (28 October 1948)
- Adolf Schärf (15 April 1955)
- Johann Böhm (21 November 1958)
- Oskar Kokoschka (10 February 1961)
- Julius Raab (10 March 1961)
- Franz Jonas (21 April 1961)
- Franz König (25 October 1968)
- Bruno Marek (22 January 1970)
- Robert Stolz (9 July 1970)
- Bruno Kreisky (11 December 1975)
- Felix Slavik (28 February 1977)
- Anton Benya (29 June 1977)
- Herbert von Karajan (24 April 1978)
- Karl Böhm (12 September 1978)
- Hertha Firnberg (24 September 1979)
- Ernst Krenek (26 September 1980)
- Alfred Maleta (27 February 1981)
- Bruno Pittermann (27 February 1981)
- Rosa Jochmann (2 July 1981)
- Konrad Lorenz (18 February 1983)
- Rudolf Sallinger (24 February 1984)
- Elias Canetti (26 April 1985)
- Fritz Hochwälder (28 February 1986)
- Rudolf Kirchschläger (24 October 1986)
- Leonard Bernstein (10 December 1987)
- Gottfried von Einem (29 January 1988)
- Benedikt Zorn (22 February 1989)
- Rudolf Pöder (6 December 1990)
- Gertrude Fröhlich-Sandner (1993)
- Karl Dittrich (1993)
- Viktor Emil Frankl (28 June 1995)
- Leopold Gratz (1995)
- Helmut Zilk (1995)
- Hans Mayr (1995)
- Simon Wiesenthal (1995)
- Maria Schaumayer (9 August 1996)
- Karl Fellinger (30 May 1997)
- Max Weiler (17 December 1999)
- Billy Wilder (29 September 2000)
- Theodor "Teddy" Kollek (23 May 2001)
- Carl Szokoll (2003)
- Erika Chary (29 May 2008)
