= 2010 Viennese state election =

- 10 October 2010

All 100 seats in the Gemeinderat and Landtag of Vienna 51 seats needed for a majority All 13 seats in the state government
- Turnout: 774,079 (67.6%) ▲6.8%
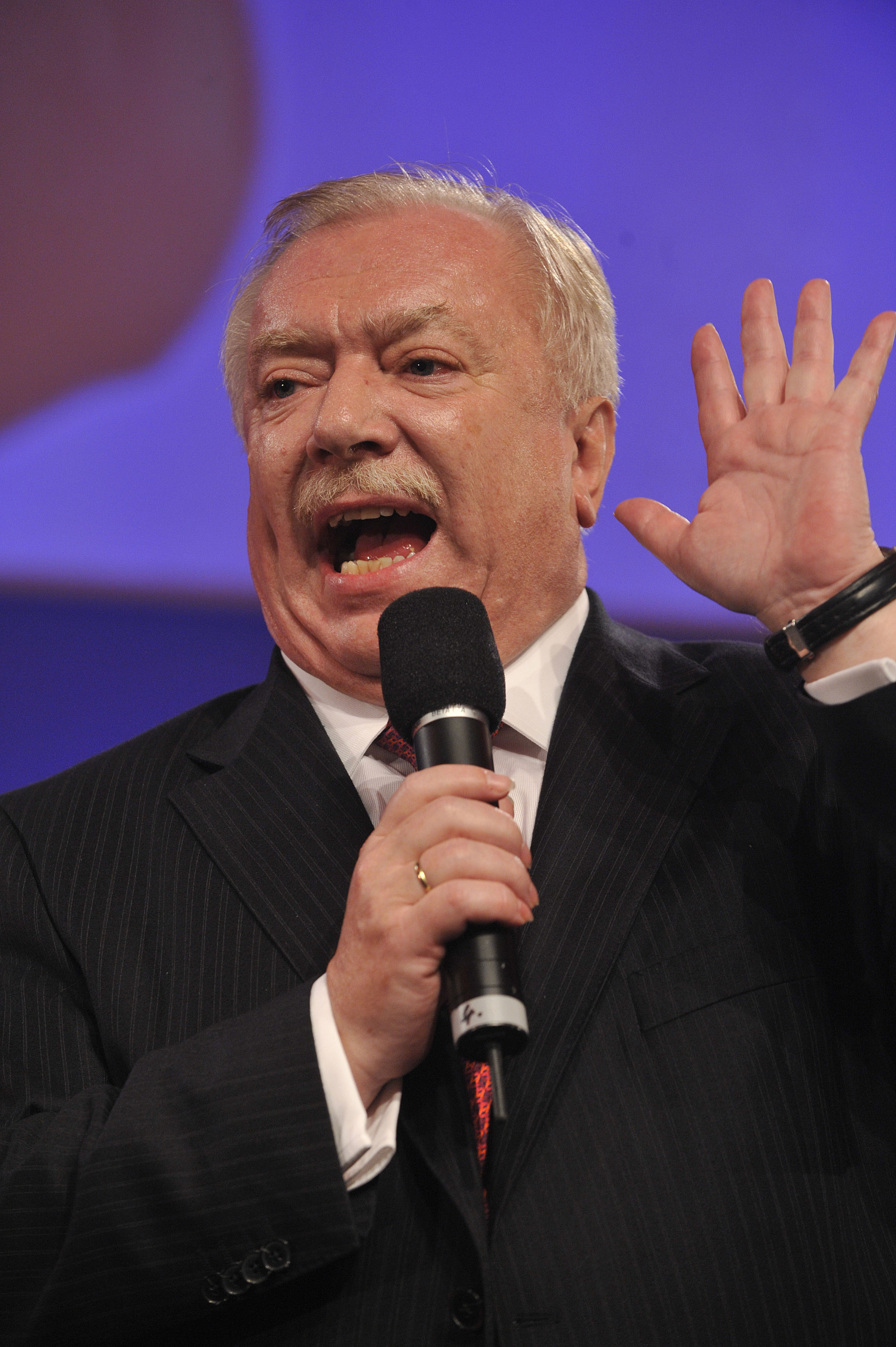

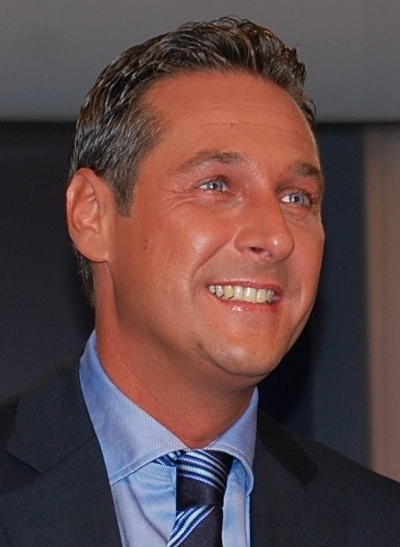

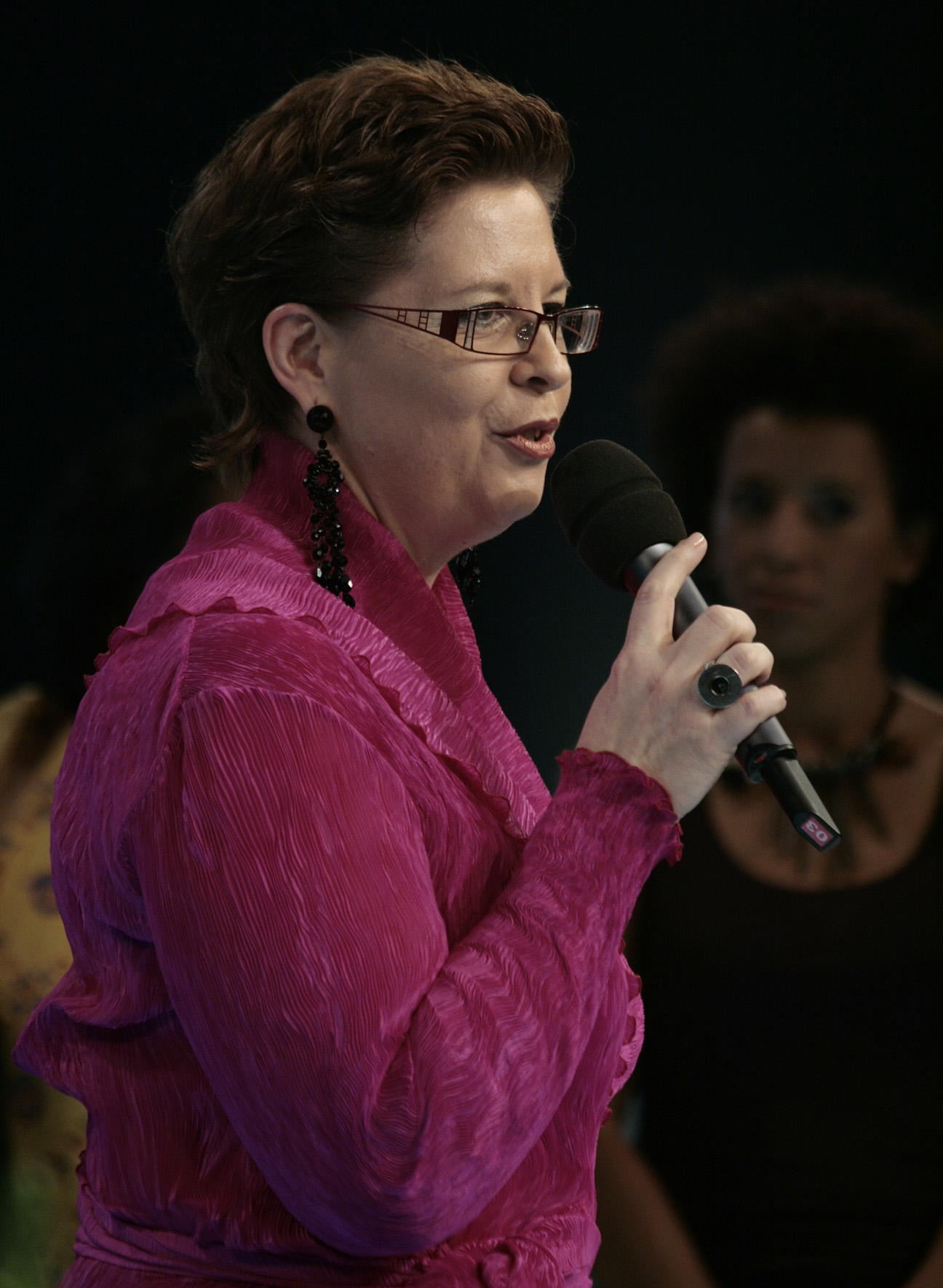

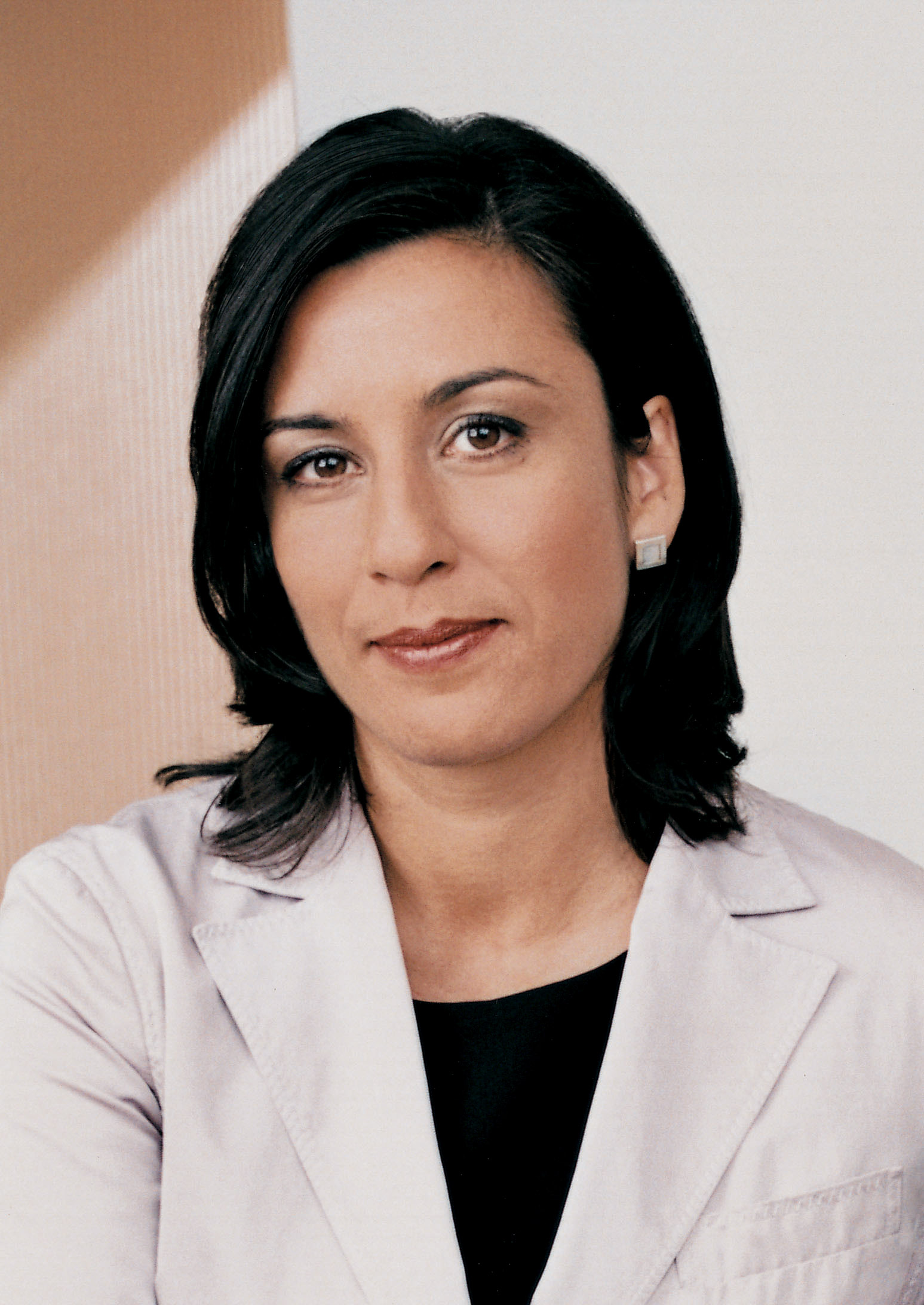
	First party	Second party
Leader	Michael Häupl	Heinz-Christian Strache
Party	SPÖ	FPÖ
Last election	55 seats, 49.1%	13 seats, 14.8%
Seats won	49	27
Seat change	▼6	▲14
Popular vote	334,757	194,517
Percentage	44.3%	25.8%
Swing	▼4.8%	▲10.9%
	Third party	Fourth party
Leader	Christine Marek	Maria Vassilakou
Party	ÖVP	Greens
Last election	18 seats, 18.8%	14 seats, 14.6%
Seats won	13	11
Seat change	▼5	▼3
Popular vote	105,627	95,445
Percentage	14.0%	12.6%
Swing	▼4.8%	▼2.0%
Mayor and Governor before election
Michael Häupl
SPÖ
Elected Mayor and Governor
Michael Häupl
SPÖ

The 2010 Viennese state election was held on 10 October 2010 to elect the members of the Gemeinderat and Landtag of Vienna.

The Social Democratic Party of Austria (SPÖ) lost its absolute majority for the first time since 1996. The Freedom Party of Austria (FPÖ) became the second largest party on a swing of eleven percentage points, while the Austrian People's Party (ÖVP) and The Greens both suffered losses. Mayor and Governor Michael Häupl was ultimately re-elected after the SPÖ formed a coalition with The Greens, the first state-level "red-green" coalition in Austrian history.

== Background ==
The Viennese constitution mandates that cabinet positions in the city government (city councillors, German: Stadtsräten) be allocated between parties proportionally in accordance with the share of votes won by each; this is known as Proporz. The number of city councillors is voted upon by the Landtag after each election, and may legally vary between nine and fifteen. City councillors are divided into two groups – "senior" councillors, who hold a cabinet portfolio, and "non-executive" councillors who do not. Non-executive councillors may vote in cabinet meetings, but do not otherwise hold any government responsibility. In practice, parties seek to form a coalition which holds a majority in both the Landtag and city government. City councillors bound to the coalition become senior councillors, while the opposition are relegated to non-executive status.

In the 2005 state election, the SPÖ increased its majority, while the opposition was divided between the ÖVP (18.8%), FPÖ (14.8%), and Greens (14.6%). Unusually, the Greens won one more seat than the FPÖ despite winning fewer votes; they also won an additional city councillor. The SPÖ won nine councillors, the ÖVP and Greens two each, and the FPÖ one. The SPÖ formed government alone.

== Electoral system ==
The 100 seats of the Gemeinderat and Landtag of Vienna are elected via open list proportional representation in a two-step process. The seats are distributed between eighteen multi-member constituencies. For parties to receive any representation in the Landtag, they must either win at least one seat in a constituency directly, or clear a 5 percent state-wide electoral threshold. Seats are distributed in constituencies according to the Hare quota, with any remaining seats allocated using the D'Hondt method at the state level, to ensure overall proportionality between a party's vote share and its share of seats.

== Contesting parties ==
The table below lists parties represented in the previous Landtag.

Name		Ideology	Leader	2005 result		
Name		Ideology	Leader	Votes (%)	Seats	Councillors
SPÖ	Social Democratic Party of Austria; Sozialdemokratische Partei Österreichs	Social democracy	Michael Häupl	49.1%	55 / 100	9 / 14
ÖVP	Austrian People's Party; Österreichische Volkspartei	Christian democracy	Christine Marek	18.8%	18 / 100	2 / 14
GRÜNE	The Greens – The Green Alternative; Die Grünen – Die Grüne Alternative	Green politics	Maria Vassilakou	14.6%	14 / 100	2 / 14
FPÖ	Freedom Party of Austria; Freiheitliche Partei Österreichs	Right-wing populism Euroscepticism	Heinz-Christian Strache	14.8%	13 / 100	1 / 14

In addition to the parties already represented in the Landtag, six parties collected enough signatures to be placed on the ballot.

- Alliance for the Future of Austria (BZÖ)
- Communist Party of Austria (KPÖ)
- Liberal Forum (LIF) – on the ballot only in 15 constituencies
- MUT Party, Human Environment Animal Welfare (MUT) – on the ballot only in Centre and Inner West
- Direct Democracy Platform (DEM) – on the ballot only in Donaustadt
- Socialist Left Party (SLP) – on the ballot only in Brigittenau

== Results ==
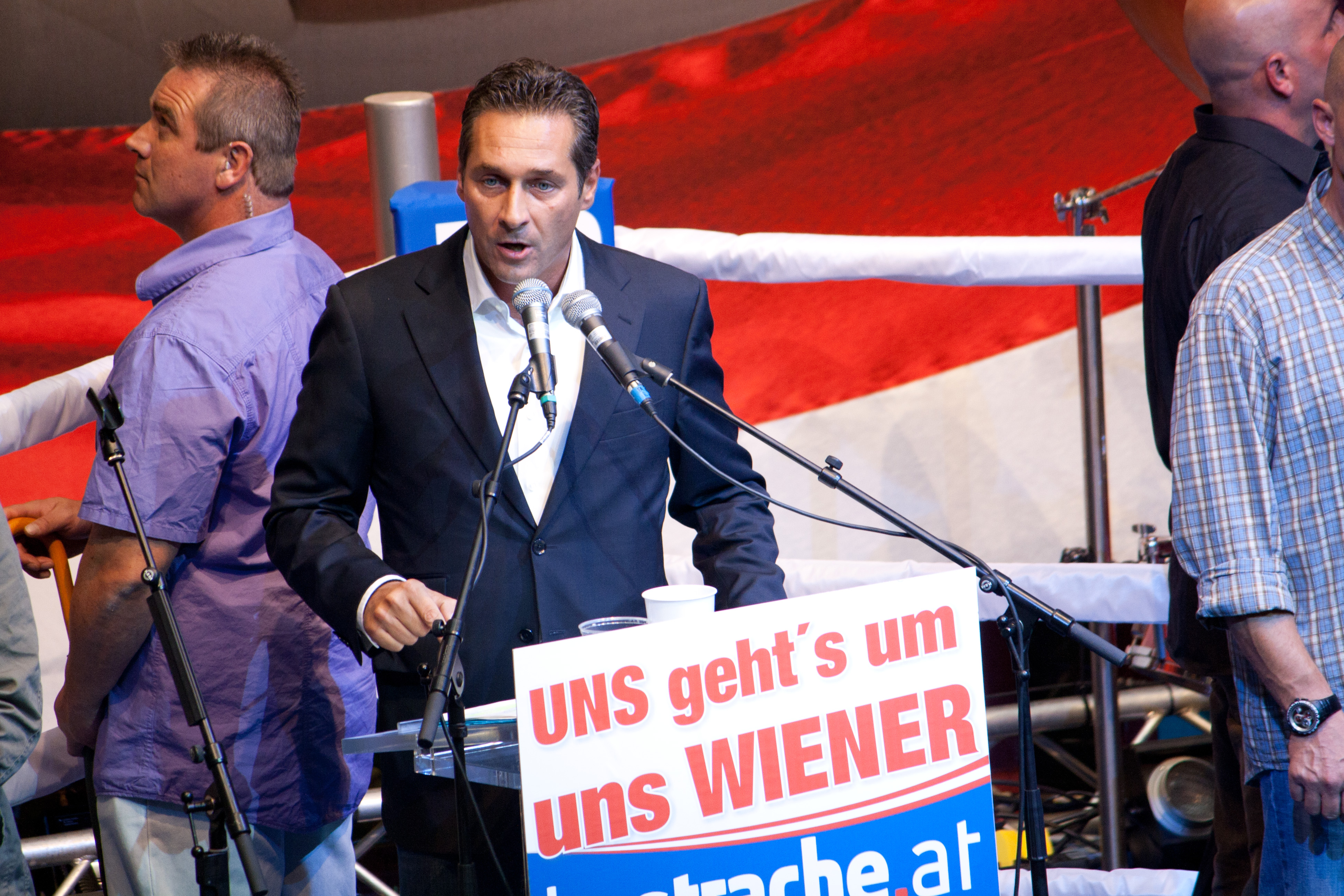
Heinz-Christian Strache, speaking at a rally before the 2010 Vienna elections.

Party	Votes	%	+/−	Seats	+/−	Coun.	+/−
Social Democratic Party of Austria (SPÖ)	334,757	44.34	–4.75	49	–6	8	–1
Freedom Party of Austria (FPÖ)	194,517	25.77	+10.94	27	+14	3	+2
Austrian People's Party (ÖVP)	105,627	13.99	–4.78	13	–5	1	–1
The Greens – The Green Alternative (GRÜNE)	95,445	12.64	–1.99	11	–3	1	–1
Communist Party of Austria (KPÖ)	8,425	1.12	–0.35	0	±0	0	±0
Alliance for the Future of Austria (BZÖ)	10,057	1.33	+0.18	0	±0	0	±0
Liberal Forum (LIF)	5,192	0.69	+0.69	0	±0	0	±0
MUT Party, Human Environment Animal Welfare (MUT)	514	0.07	New	0	New	0	New
Direct Democracy Platform (DEM)	331	0.04	New	0	New	0	New
Socialist Left Party (SLP)	124	0.01	–0.01	0	±0	0	±0
Invalid/blank votes	19,141	–	–	–	–	–	–
Total	774,079	100	–	100	0	13	–1
Registered voters/turnout	1,144,510	67.63	+6.82	–	–	–	–
Source: Viennese Government

Popular vote
SPÖ	44.34%
FPÖ	25.77%
ÖVP	13.99%
GRÜNE	12.64%
Other	3.26%

Gemeinderat and Landtag seats
SPÖ	49.00%
FPÖ	27.00%
ÖVP	13.00%
GRÜNE	11.00%

=== Results by constituency ===
Constituency	SPÖ		FPÖ		ÖVP		Grüne		Others	Total seats	Turnout
Constituency	%	S	%	S	%	S	%	S	%	Total seats	Turnout
Centre	39.7	3	16.9	1	18.8	1	20.4	1	4.2	6	67.6
Inner West	37.3	2	14.2		19.0	1	24.9	1	4.6	4	70.3
Leopoldstadt	45.6	2	22.5	1	11.0		17.0	1	3.9	4	65.8
Landstraße	43.0	2	20.2	1	16.5		16.8	1	3.5	4	68.1
Favoriten	48.8	5	33.8	3	8.6		6.2		2.7	8	65.0
Simmering	49.0	2	35.5	2	7.5		5.7		2.3	4	65.8
Meidling	47.1	2	27.1	1	11.5		11.1		3.3	3	64.6
Hietzing	34.9	1	19.8		28.8	1	13.5		3.0	2	73.2
Penzing	42.3	2	24.6	1	16.3		13.5		2.3	3	68.4
Rudolfsheim-Fünfhaus	47.3	1	24.0		9.8		16.2		2.7	1	62.8
Ottakring	46.8	2	24.7	1	11.3		14.0		2.2	3	66.6
Hernals	40.5	1	22.4		16.6		16.7		3.8	1	67.4
Währing	33.6	1	16.9		25.0	1	20.6		3.9	2	70.6
Döbling	38.0	1	20.2	1	26.4	1	12.7		2.7	3	70.6
Brigittenau	49.6	2	28.3	1	8.4		10.4		3.2	3	64.6
Floridsdorf	47.1	5	33.3	3	9.6	1	7.2		2.9	9	67.7
Donaustadt	48.7	5	31.4	3	9.4		7.4		3.1	8	69.0
Liesing	44.7	3	27.5	1	15.0	1	9.9		3.0	5	71.3
Remaining seats		7		7		6		7		27	
Total	44.3	49	25.8	27	14.0	13	12.6	11	3.3	100	67.6
Source: Viennese Government

== Aftermath ==
After the election, Häupl did not commit to negotiations with any party, but did rule out a coalition with the FPÖ. He stated he would not conduct simultaneous parallel negotiations with both the ÖVP and Greens. FPÖ leader Strache stated that he was open to any potential coalition, and declared he would remain in Vienna state politics to serve in the most senior position were available to him; mayor, deputy mayor, or city councillor. There were divisions within the ÖVP, as some members favoured remaining in opposition to build the party's profile with hopes of making gains in the next election.

There was substantial support for a prospective SPÖ-Green coalition within both parties. Regional SPÖ leaders Michael Ritsch and Peter Kaiser both spoke out in favour, as did Stefan Schennach, a former Green politician who joined the SPÖ earlier in the year. The Socialist Youth Austria also preferred this arrangement. Shortly after the election, a website titled "red-green for Vienna" was registered, featuring statements of support from various public figures, including director David Schalko, student activist Barbara Blaha, journalist Robert Misik, and former Liberal Forum leader Heide Schmidt.

At a party meeting, the Greens unanimously voted to begin negotiations with the SPÖ. This was reciprocated on 22 October. On 12 November, the two parties announced that they had agreed come to a coalition agreement. Greens leader Maria Vassilakou became Councillor for Urban Planning, Traffic & Transport, Climate Protection, Energy Planning and Public Participation in the fifth Häupl cabinet. This was the first time a coalition government of the SPÖ and Greens had taken office in an Austrian state.
