= Blaschke =

Blaschke is a German surname. Notable people with the surname include:

- Hugo Blaschke, (1881–1959), German dental surgeon, Hitler's personal dentist
- Jarin Blaschke (born 1978), American cinematographer
- Jayme Lynn Blaschke (born 1969), American journalist and author of science fiction, fantasy and related non-fiction
- Wilhelm Blaschke (1885–1962), Austro-Hungarian differential and integral geometer
- Hanns Blaschke (1896–1971), Austrian NSDAP politician

== See also ==
- 17637 Blaschke, a main-belt asteroid
