= Franz Josef Hauer =

Austrian politician

Mayor of Vienna
- In office 1727–1728
- Preceded by: Josef Hartmann
- Succeeded by: Johann Franz Purck
- In office 1721–1724
- Preceded by: Josef Hartmann
- Succeeded by: Josef Hartmann

Franz Josef Hauer was a mayor of Vienna.
