= Peter Joseph Kofler =

Austrian politician (1700–1764)

Peter Joseph Edler von Kofler
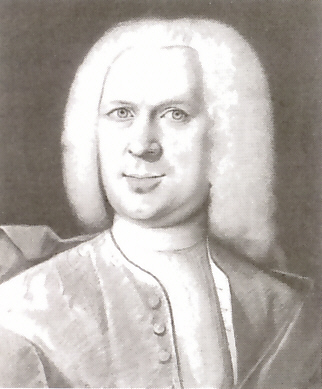

Mayor of Vienna
- In office 1751–1764
- Preceded by: Andreas Ludwig Leitgeb
- Succeeded by: Leopold Franz Gruber
- In office 1741–1744
- Preceded by: Johann Adam von Zahlheim
- Succeeded by: Andreas Ludwig Leitgeb

Personal details
- Born: 29 July 1700 Ruffré-Mendola, Bishopric of Trent
- Died: 26 May 1764 (aged 63) Vienna, Habsburg monarchy

Peter Joseph Edler von Kofler (29 July 1700 – 26 May 1764) was a mayor of Vienna.
