= Josef Anton Bellesini =

Austrian politician

Mayor of Vienna
- In office 1764–1767
- Preceded by: Leopold Franz Gruber
- Succeeded by: Leopold Franz Gruber

Josef Anton Bellesini was a mayor of Vienna.
