= Johann Franz Purck =

Austrian politician

Mayor of Vienna
- In office 1729–1730
- Preceded by: Franz Josef Hauer
- Succeeded by: Franz Daniel Bartuska

Johann Franz Purck was a mayor of Vienna.
