= Leopold Franz Gruber =

Austrian politician

Mayor of Vienna
- In office 1767–1773
- Preceded by: Josef Anton Bellesini
- Succeeded by: Josef Georg Hörl
- Incumbent
- Assumed office 1764
- Preceded by: Peter Joseph Edler von Kofler
- Succeeded by: Josef Anton Bellesini

Leopold Franz Gruber was a mayor of Vienna.
