= Franz Daniel Bartuska =

Austrian politician

Franz Daniel Edler von Bartuska

Mayor of Vienna
- In office 1731–1732
- Preceded by: Johann Franz Purck
- Succeeded by: Andreas Ludwig Leitgeb

Franz Daniel Edler von Bartuska was a mayor of Vienna.
