= Andreas Ludwig Leitgeb =

Austrian politician

Mayor of Vienna
- In office 1745–1751
- Preceded by: Peter Joseph Kofler
- Succeeded by: Peter Joseph Kofler
- In office 1733–1736
- Preceded by: Franz Daniel Edler von Bartuska
- Succeeded by: Johann Adam von Zahlheim

Andreas Ludwig Leitgeb was a mayor of Vienna.
