= Johann Adam von Zahlheim =

Austrian politician

Mayor of Vienna
- In office 1737–1740
- Preceded by: Andreas Ludwig Leitgeb
- Succeeded by: Peter Joseph Kofler

Johann Adam von Zahlheim was a mayor of Vienna.
