= 1898 ICA Track Cycling World Championships =

- Venue: Vienna, Austria
- Date: 8–12 September 1898
- Velodrome: Wiener Prater
- Events: 4

The 1898 ICA Track Cycling World Championships were the World Championship for track cycling. They took place in Vienna, Austria from 8 to 12 September 1898. Four events for men were contested, two for professionals and two for amateurs.

== Medal summary ==
Event	Gold	Silver	Bronze
Men's Professional Events
Men's sprint	George A. Banker; United States	Franz Verheyen; Germany	Edmond Jacquelin; France
Men's motor-paced	Richard Palmer; Great Britain		
Men's Amateur Events
Men's sprint	Paul Albert; Germany	Ludwig Opel; Germany	Thomas Summersgill; Great Britain
Men's motor-paced	Albert-John Cherry; Great Britain	Gustav Graben; Germany	Anton Huneck; Austria

== Medal table ==
Rank	Nation	Gold	Silver	Bronze	Total
1	Great Britain (GBR)	2	0	1	3
2	Germany (GER)	1	3	0	4
3	United States (USA)	1	0	0	1
4	Austria (AUT)	0	0	1	1
4	France (FRA)	0	0	1	1
Totals (5 entries)		4	3	3	10
