= List of mayors of Vienna =

Mayor and Governor of Vienna
- Bürgermeister und Landeshauptmann von Wien
- Coat of arms of Vienna

- Flag of Vienna

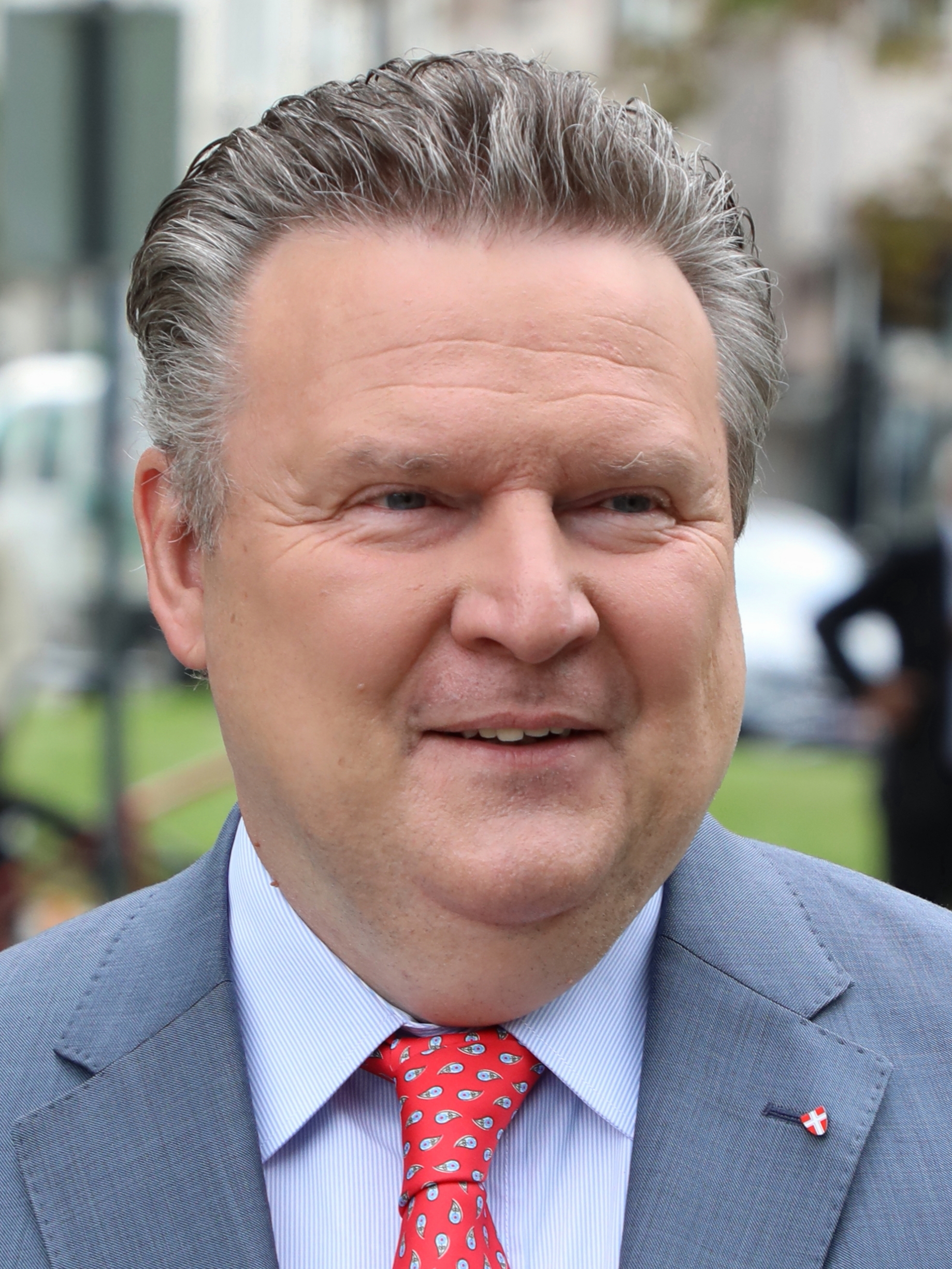
- Incumbent; Michael Ludwig since 24 May 2018
- Style: Mr. Mayor (on city instance); Mr. Governor (on state instance)
- Status: Landeshauptmann; Mayor
- Member of: State Government; Wiener Landtag und Gemeinderat
- Residence: Vienna City Hall
- Seat: Rathausplatz, Innere Stadt
- Nominator: Political parties
- Appointer: The Landtag sworn in by the President
- Term length: Five years (no term limit)
- Constituting instrument: Federal Constitutional Law
- Formation: 1282
- First holder: Konrad Poll; First Mayor in the Duchy and Archduchy of Austria; Jakob Reumann; First Mayor and State Governor; Rudolf Prikryl; First Mayor and State Governor in the Second Republic
- Deputy: Bettina Emmerling; Deputy Mayor and Deputy Governor of Vienna
- Website: wien.gv.at

This is a list of mayors and governors of Vienna since 1282.

Vienna is the capital city of Austria. Since 1920, it has also been an Austrian state, with its mayor doubling as the Landeshauptmann (governor or minister-president) of the State of Vienna.

Since 24 May 2018, Michael Ludwig has served as Mayor of Vienna.

== Duchy and Archduchy of Austria ==
- Konrad Poll 1282
- Heinrich Hansgraf 1285
- Konrad von Eslarn 1287
- Konrad Poll 1288–1305
- Heinrich Chrannest 1305–1307
- Dietrich von Kahlenberg 1307
- Heinrich von d. Neisse 1308
- Niklas von Eslarn 1309
- Niklas von Eslarn 1309–1313
- Heinrich von d. Neisse 1310
- Niklas Poll 1313–1315
- Hermann von St. Pölten 1316
- Niklas von Eslarn 1316–1317
- Hermann von St. Pölten 1318
- Otto Wülfleinstorfer 1319–1323
- Stephan Chriegler 1323
- Niklas Poll 1324–1327
- Stephan Chriegler 1327–1328
- Heinrich Lang 1329–1330
- Dietrich Urbetsch 1332–1333
- Hermann Snaezl 1333–1334
- Dietrich Urbetsch 1335–1337
- Konrad von Eslarn 1337–1338
- Berthold Poll 1338–1339
- Konrad Wiltwerker 1340–1343
- Hagen von Spielberg 1343–1344
- Reinprecht Zaunrüd 1345–1347
- Friedrich von Tierna 1348–1349
- Dietrich Flusthart 1350–1351
- Friedrich von Tierna 1352
- Heinrich Würfel 1353
- Dietrich Flusthart 1354
- Haunold Schuchler the Elder 1354
- Leopold Polz 1355
- Heinrich Straicher 1356–1357
- Haunold Schuchler the Elder 1357–1358
- Leopold Polz 1358–1360
- Heinrich Straicher 1359–1360
- Haunold Schuchler the Elder 1360–1361
- Hans von Tierna 1362–1364
- Friedrich Rüschl 1364
- Lukas Popfinger 1365–1366
- Thomas Swaeml 1366–1367
- Niklas Würfel 1368–1370
- Thomas Swaeml 1370–1371
- Ulrich Rößl 1372–1374
- Jans am Kienmarkt 1374–1376
- Paul Holzkäufl 1376–1379
- Jans am Kienmarkt 1379–1381
- Paul Holzkäufl 1381–1386
- Michael Geukramer 1386–1395
- Paul Holzkäufl 1396
- Paul Würfel 1396–1397
- Jakob Dorn 1398
- Hans Rockh 1398–1399
- Paul Holzkäufl 1399–1400
- Berthold Lang 1401
- Paul Würfel 1401–1403
- Haunold Schuchler the Younger 1402–1403
- Konrad Vorlauf 1403–1404
- Paul Würfel 1404–1405
- Rudolf Angerfelder 1405–1406
- Konrad Vorlauf 1406–1408
- Konrad Rampersdorffer 1408
- Hans Feldsberger 1408–1409
- Paul Geyr 1410
- Albrecht Zetter 1410–1411
- Rudolf Angerfelder 1411–1419
- Hans Musterer 1420–1421
- Ulrich Gundloch 1422
- Konrad Holzler the Elder 1423–1425
- Hans Scharffenberger 1425–1426
- Paul Würfel the Younger 1427
- Niklas Undermhimmel 1428–1429
- Konrad Holzler the Elder 1430–1433
- Hans Steger 1434–1439
- Niklas Undermhimmel 1438
- Konrad Holzler the Elder 1440–1441
- Andre Hiltprant 1442
- Hans Steger 1443
- Hans Haringseer 1444–1446
- Hans Steger 1447–1449
- Konrad Holzler the Younger 1450–1451
- Oswald Reicholf 1452
- Niklas Teschler 1453
- Oswald Reicholf 1454
- Konrad Holzler the Younger 1455
- Niklas Teschler 1456–1457
- Thomas Schwarz 1457
- Jakob Starch 1457–1460
- Christian Prenner 1461–1462
- Sebastian Ziegelhauser 1462
- Wolfgang Holzer 1462–1463
- Friedrich Ebmer 1463
- Ulrich Metzleinstorffer 1464–1466
- Martin Enthaimer 1467
- Andreas Schönbrucker 1467–1473
- Hans Heml 1473–1479
- Laurenz Haiden 1479–1484
- Stephan Een 1485–1486
- Leonhard Radauner 1487–1489
- Laurenz Taschendorfer 1489–1490
- Stephan Een 1490
- Paul Keck 1490–1493
- Friedrich Geldreich 1494–1496
- Paul Keck 1497 – 99
- Wolfgang Rieder 1500–1501
- Leonhard Lackner 1502
- Wolfgang Zauner 1503
- Paul Keck 1504–1507
- Sigmund Pernfuß 1507
- Paul Keck 1508
- Wolfgang Rieder 1509–1510
- Hans Süß 1511–1512
- Leonhard Pudmannsdorfer 1512
- Hans Kuchler 1513
- Friedrich Piesch 1514
- Johann Kaufmann 1515
- Hans Süß 1516
- Hans Rinner 1516–1517
- Leonhard Pudmannsdorfer 1518
- Wolfgang Kirchhofer 1519–1520
- Hans Süß 1520
- Martin Siebenbürger 1520–1521
- Gabriel Guetrater 1522–1524
- Hans Süß 1524–1526

== Habsburg Monarchy ==
- Roman Staudinger 1526
- Sebastian Sulzbeck 1527
- Wolfgang Treu 1528–1530
- Sebastian Eysler 1531
- Wolfgang Treu 1532–1533
- Johann Pilhamer 1534–1535
- Wolfgang Treu 1536–1537
- Hermes Schallautzer 1538–1539
- Paul Pernfuß 1540–1541
- Stephan Tenck 1542–46
- Sebastian Schrantz 1547–1548
- Sebastian Hutstocker 1549–1550
- Christoph Hayden 1551–1552
- Sebastian Hutstocker 1553–1555
- Hans Übermann 1556–1557
- Georg Prantstetter 1558–1559
- Thomas Siebenbürger 1560–1561
- Hermann Bayr 1562–1563
- Matthias Brunnhofer 1564–1565
- Hans Übermann 1566–1567
- Georg Prantstetter 1568–1569
- Hanns von Thau 1570–1571
- Georg Prantstetter 1572–1573
- Hanns von Thau 1574–1575
- Christoph Hutstocker 1576–1577
- Hanns von Thau 1578–1579
- Bartholomäus Prantner 1580–1581
- Hanns von Thau 1582–1583
- Bartholomäus Prantner 1584–1585
- Oswald Hüttendorfer 1586–1587
- Hanns von Thau 1588–1589
- Georg Fürst 1590–1591
- Bartholomäus Prantner 1592–1595
- Paul Steyrer 1596–1597
- Oswald Hüttendorfer 1598–1599
- Andreas Rieder 1600 – 01
- Georg Fürst 1602 – 03
- Augustin Haffner 1604 – 07
- Lukas Lausser 1608 – 09
- Daniel Moser 1610 – 13
- Veit Resch 1614 – 15
- Daniel Moser 1616 – 22
- Paul Wiedemann 1623 – 25
- Daniel Moser 1626 – 37
- Christoph Faßoldt 1638 – 39
- Konrad Bramber 1640 – 45
- Caspar Bernhardt 1646 – 48
- Johann Georg Dietmayr 1648 – 53
- Thomas Wolfgang Puechenegger 1654 – 55
- Johann Georg Dietmayr von Dietmannsdorf 1656 – 59
- Johann Christoph Holzner 1660 – 63
- Johann Georg Dietmayr von Dietmannsdorf 1664 – 67
- Johann Christoph Holzner 1667 – 69
- Daniel Lazarus Springer 1670 – 73
- Peter Sebastian Fügenschuh 1674 – 77
- Daniel Lazarus Springer 1678 – 79
- Johann Andreas von Liebenberg 1680 – 83
- Simon Stephan Schuster 1684 – 87
- Daniel Fockhy 1688 – 91
- Johann Franz Peickhardt 1692 – 95
- Jakob Daniel Tepser 1696 – 99
- Johann Franz Peickhardt 1700 – 03
- Jakob Daniel Tepser 1704 – 07
- Johann Franz Wenighoffer 1708 – 12
- Johann Lorenz Trunck von Guttenberg 1713 – 16
- Josef Hartmann 1717 – 20
- Franz Josef Hauer 1721 – 24
- Josef Hartmann 1725 – 26
- Franz Josef Hauer 1727 – 28
- Johann Franz Purck 1729 – 30
- Franz Daniel Edler von Bartuska 1731 – 32
- Andreas Ludwig Leitgeb 1733 – 36
- Johann Adam von Zahlheim 1737 – 40
- Peter Joseph Kofler 1741 – 44
- Andreas Ludwig Leitgeb 1745 – 51
- Peter Joseph Edler von Kofler 1751 – 64
- Leopold Franz Gruber 1764
- Josef Anton Bellesini 1764 – 67
- Leopold Franz Gruber 1767 – 73
- Josef Georg Hörl 1773–1804

== Austrian Empire and Austria-Hungary ==
- Stephan Edler von Wohlleben 1804 – 23
- Anton Joseph Edler von Leeb 1835 – 37
- Ignaz Czapka 1838 – 48
- Johann Kaspar Freiherr von Seiller 1851 – 61
- Andreas Zelinka 1861 – 68
- Cajetan Freiherr von Felder 1868 – 78
- Julius von Newald 1878 – 82
- Eduard Uhl 1882 – 89
- Johann Prix 1889 – 94
- Raimund Grübl 1894 – 95
- Hans von Friebeis 1895 – 96
- Josef Strobach 1896 – 97
- Karl Lueger 1897–1910 (CS)
- Josef Neumayer 1910 – 12 (CS)
- Richard Weiskirchner 1912 – 18 (CS)

== First Austrian Republic ==
- Richard Weiskirchner 1918 – 19 (CS)
- Jakob Reumann 1919 – 22 (SDAPÖ)

== Mayors and governors of Vienna ==
In 1922, the city of Vienna was constituted as a separate state of Austria. It had previously been the capital of Lower Austria. Thus Vienna's mayor also has the rank of a state governor.

Portrait	Mayor	Term of office			Political party
Portrait	Mayor	Took office	Left office	Days	Political party
First Austrian Republic
	Jakob Reumann	1 January 1922	13 November 1923	681	SDAPÖ
	Karl Seitz	13 November 1923	12 February 1934	3744	SDAPÖ
Federal State of Austria
	Richard Schmitz	13 February 1934	11 March 1938	1487	VF
Nazi Germany
	Hermann Neubacher	13 March 1938	14 December 1940	1007	NSDAP
	Philipp Wilhelm Jung	14 December 1940	30 December 1943	1111	NSDAP
	Hanns Blaschke	30 December 1943	6 April 1945	463	NSDAP
Second Austrian Republic
	Rudolf Prikryl	13 April 1945	16 April 1945	3	Independent
	Theodor Körner	17 April 1945	18 June 1951	2253	SPÖ
	Franz Jonas	18 June 1951	9 June 1965	5105	SPÖ
	Bruno Marek	10 June 1965	17 December 1970	2016	SPÖ
	Felix Slavik	21 December 1970	5 July 1973	927	SPÖ
	Leopold Gratz	5 July 1973	10 September 1984	4085	SPÖ
	Helmut Zilk	10 September 1984	7 November 1994	3710	SPÖ
	Michael Häupl	7 November 1994	24 May 2018	8599	SPÖ
	Michael Ludwig	24 May 2018	Incumbent	3028	SPÖ

== Longest-serving mayors ==
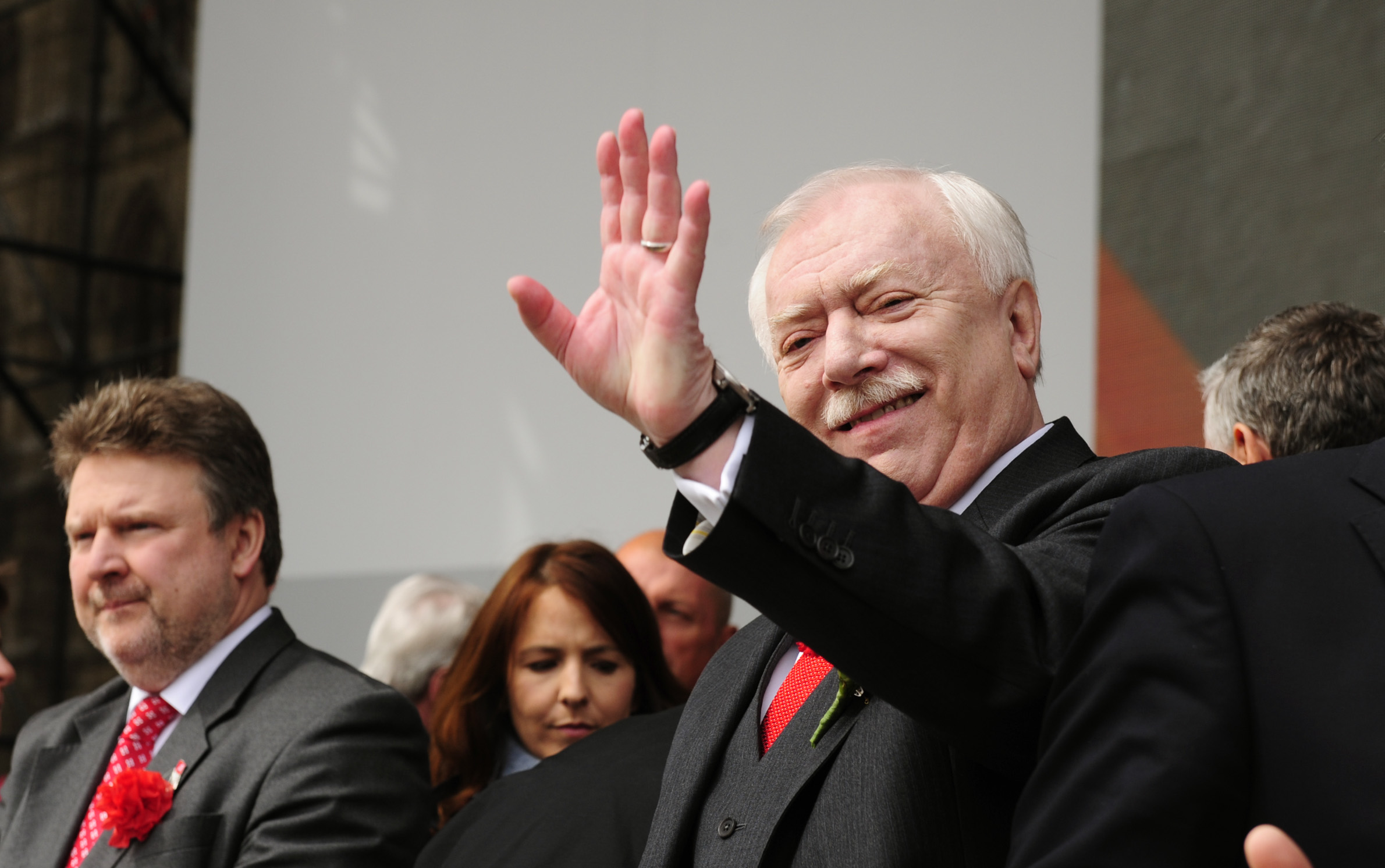
Michael Häupl (left) and Michael Ludwig (right) at the May Day celebration on Vienna's Rathausplatz, 2015. Häupl served as mayor from 1994 to 2018; Ludwig has been incumbent since 2018.

The following table lists all mayors of the Second Republic (since 1945) ranked by their length of tenure, with the incumbent mayor's tenure automatically updating daily.

Rank	Mayor	Length of tenure(s)	Timespan(s)	Party
1	Michael Häupl	23 years, 198 days	1994–2018	SPÖ
2	Franz Jonas	13 years, 353 days	1951–1965	SPÖ
3	Leopold Gratz	11 years, 67 days	1973–1984	SPÖ
4	Helmut Zilk	10 years, 58 days	1984–1994	SPÖ
5	Michael Ludwig	8 years, 106 days	2018–present	SPÖ
6	Theodor Körner	6 years, 66 days	1945–1951	SPÖ
7	Bruno Marek	5 years, 194 days	1965–1970	SPÖ
8	Felix Slavik	2 years, 196 days	1970–1973	SPÖ

== Mayors by party ==
The following table summarizes mayors of the Second Republic grouped by political party.

Party	Total time in office	Number of mayors	Mayors
**SPÖ; Social Democratic Party**	**81 years, 143 days (ongoing)**	8	Theodor Körner, Franz Jonas, Bruno Marek, Felix Slavik, Leopold Gratz, Helmut Zilk, Michael Häupl, **Michael Ludwig**

Notes:

- Green indicates the party of the current incumbent mayor
- Bold name indicates the current incumbent mayor

== Age-related statistics ==
The following table shows age-related data for all mayors of the Second Republic, with living mayors' ages automatically updating.

Mayor	Born	Age at start of mayoralty	Age at end of mayoralty	Post-mayoralty timespan	Died	Lifespan
Theodor Körner	24 April 1873	**71 years, 358 days** 17 April 1945	**78 years, 59 days** 22 June 1951	5 years, 196 days	4 January 1957	83 years, 255 days
Franz Jonas	29 September 1899	**51 years, 266 days** 22 June 1951	**65 years, 254 days** 10 June 1965	8 years, 318 days	24 April 1974	74 years, 207 days
Bruno Marek	23 January 1900	**65 years, 138 days** 10 June 1965	**70 years, 332 days** 21 December 1970	20 years, 39 days	29 January 1991	91 years, 6 days
Felix Slavik	3 May 1912	**58 years, 232 days** 21 December 1970	**61 years, 63 days** 5 July 1973	7 years, 93 days	6 October 1980	68 years, 156 days
Leopold Gratz	4 November 1929	**43 years, 243 days** 5 July 1973	**54 years, 311 days** 10 September 1984	21 years, 173 days	2 March 2006	76 years, 118 days
Helmut Zilk	9 June 1927	**57 years, 93 days** 10 September 1984	**67 years, 151 days** 7 November 1994	13 years, 352 days	24 October 2008	81 years, 137 days
Michael Häupl	14 September 1949	**45 years, 54 days** 7 November 1994	**68 years, 252 days** 24 May 2018	8 years, 106 days	—	76 years, 358 days
**Michael Ludwig**	3 April 1961	**57 years, 51 days** 24 May 2018	Incumbent			65 years, 157 days

Notes:

- Light green indicates living former mayors
- Green indicates the current incumbent mayor
- Living mayors' post-mayoralty timespan and lifespan automatically update daily

== Graphical representation ==
This is a graphical lifespan timeline of the mayors of Vienna since 1945, listed in order of first assuming office.

The following chart shows mayors by their age (living mayors in green), with the years of their time in office in color.

== See also ==
- History of Vienna
- Timeline of Vienna
