= Michael Häupl =

Austrian politician (born 1949)

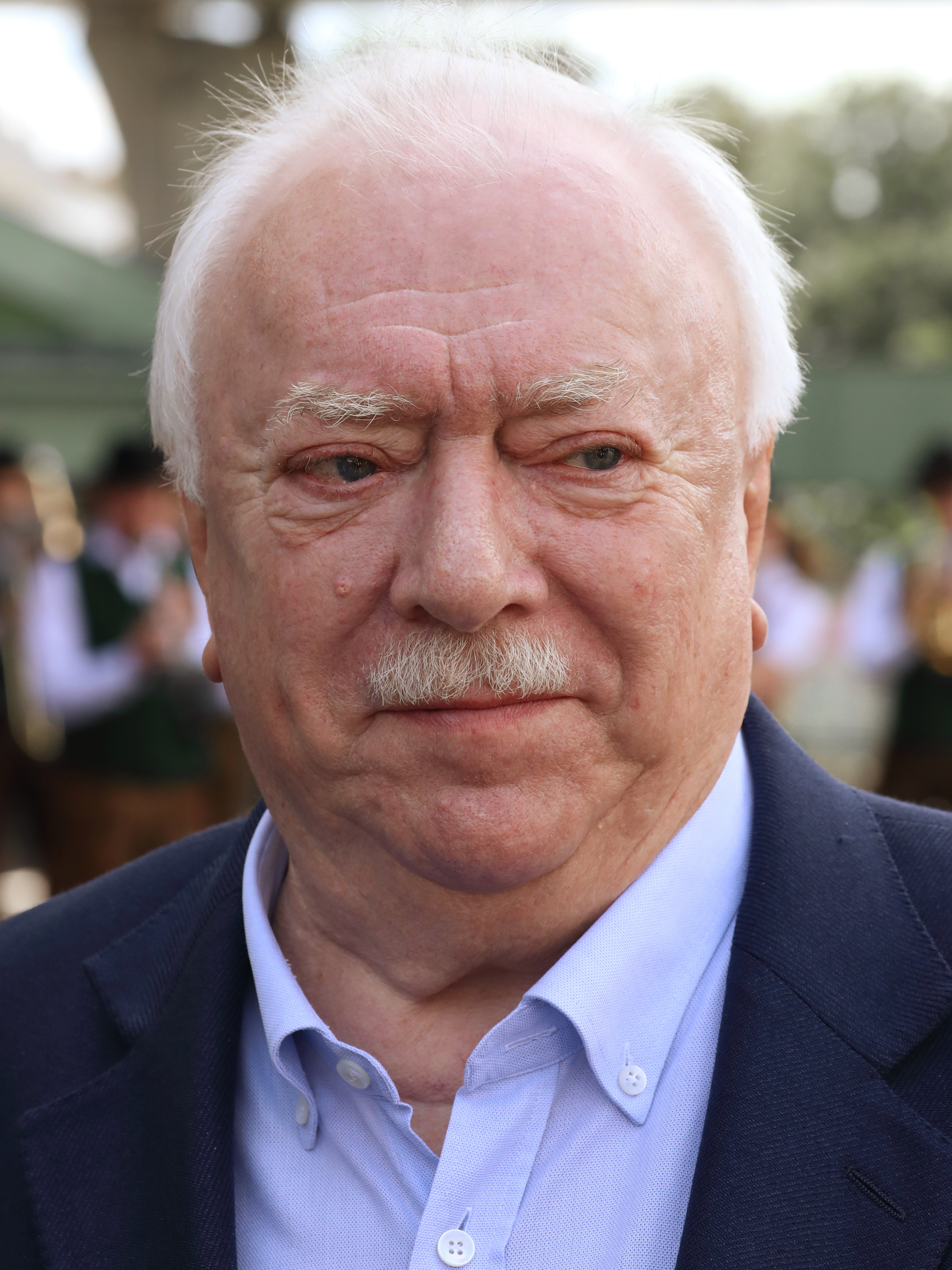
- Häupl in 2023

Mayor and Governor of Vienna
- In office 7 November 1994 – 24 May 2018
- Preceded by: Helmut Zilk
- Succeeded by: Michael Ludwig

Personal details
- Born: 14 September 1949 (age 77) Altlengbach, Austria
- Party: Social Democratic Party

Michael Häupl (born 14 September 1949) is an Austrian politician. A member of the Social Democratic Party of Austria (SPÖ), he served as mayor and governor of Vienna from 1994 to 2018.

== Early life and education ==
Häupl was born in Altlengbach, a small town in Lower Austria. He studied biology and zoology at the University of Vienna. He subsequently worked in the herpetological collection of the Natural History Museum Vienna from 1975 to 1983.

== Political career ==
Häupl led the Socialist Students of Austria from 1975 to 1977. From 1983 to 1988, he served as a member of the Municipal Council and Landtag of Vienna, and subsequently as City Councillor for Sport and the Environment. He became leader of the Vienna branch of the SPÖ in 1993, and succeeded Helmut Zilk as Mayor and Governor of Vienna on 7 November 1994.

In the 1996 state election, the SPÖ lost its absolute majority in the Vienna State Parliament for the first time, receiving 39.15 per cent of the vote and 43 of the 100 seats. It subsequently formed a coalition government with the Austrian People's Party (ÖVP). The SPÖ regained its absolute majority in the 2001 election and retained it in 2005. Following the 2010 election, in which the SPÖ fell one seat short of an absolute majority, Häupl formed a coalition with the Greens, creating Austria's first red–green state government. This coalition remained in office for two terms. Häupl stepped down as mayor in 2018, midway through his fifth term, after 23 years in office, and was succeeded by Michael Ludwig.

During his tenure as mayor, Häupl oversaw the development of several new urban districts, including Seestadt Aspern, the Sonnwendviertel and the Nordbahnviertel, as well as the expansion of the Vienna U-Bahn network, which grew from 57 stations at the beginning of his mayoralty to 98 stations by the time he left office.

== Personal life ==
Häupl had a daughter from his first marriage. His second marriage was to Helga Häupl-Seitz, with whom he had a son. On May 20, 2011, he married Barbara Hörnlein, who in 2015 became medical director of the Otto Wagner Hospital, and until around June 2016, medical director of the Wilhelminenspital, after which she became director of the Vienna Regional Health Insurance Fund.

In his younger years, Renate Brauner, a city councillor and former deputy mayor until 2018, was his partner. Their close friendship has endured to this day; as Die Presse wrote in October 2010, "Häupl can rely on few people as blindly as he does on his deputy."

In 2024, Häupl revealed that he had been diagnosed with Parkinson's disease.

Political offices
Preceded by Helmut Zilk	Mayor of Vienna; 1994–2018	Succeeded by Michael Ludwig
