= Philipp Wilhelm Jung =

German Nazi politician; Mayor of Vienna

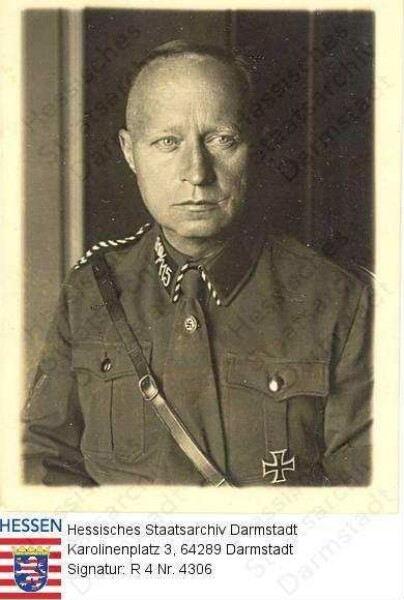
Philipp Wilhelm Jung

Philipp Wilhelm Jung (16 September 1884 – 9 September 1965) was a German Nazi politician.

Jung was born in Nieder-Flörsheim in the Grand Duchy of Hesse as the son of an elementary school teacher. He earned a doctoral degree in law.

Jung joined the SA in 1927 and the Nazi party in 1930. In 1933, after the Nazi Machtergreifung, he became president of the Hessian parliament. After the dismissal of Wilhelm Ehrhard by the Nazis, Jung was appointed provisional mayor of the city of Mainz. Already in May 1933 he was displaced by Robert Barth. He was prime minister of the People's State of Hesse from September 1933 until March 1935 when this function was taken over by Jakob Sprenger. During World War II Jung was the mayor of Vienna (1940–1943).

Jung died in Worms, West Germany in 1965.

Preceded by Hermann Neubacher	Mayor of Vienna; 1940–1943	Succeeded by Hanns Blaschke
