= Rudolf Prikryl =

Provisional Mayor of Vienna in 1945

Rudolf Prikryl

Rudolf Prikryl (21 March 1896 – 13 June 1965) was the provisionally-instated mayor of Vienna from 13 April to 16 April 1945, and is remembered as the "three days' mayor" (German: Drei-Tage-Bürgermeister).

Prikryl was born in Vienna, grew up in Alsergrund, and became a plumber's assistant. He served in the First World War, and married for the first time, getting divorced soon after. In the 1930s, he left his second wife and their two children and travelled to France, continuing on to Spain in 1938. He fought in the International Brigade in the Spanish Civil War against the Nationalists, and was injured. There is no reliable information about his movements in the time thereafter.

At the end of the Second World War, he was back in Vienna, and was apparently recognised by a Soviet officer alongside whom he had fought in Spain. This chance meeting resulted in him being made mayor, although the exact reasoning remains unclear. Although being Vienna's only communist mayor, the Communist Party of Austria never acknowledged Prikryl as a member.

His time as mayor saw no practical policy decisions, instead concentrating on bureaucratic tasks, chiefly giving out permissions of various kinds. On 17 April he was replaced by Theodor Körner.

Prikryl later married again, and started a plumbing firm, which later went bankrupt. He died in Vienna in poverty, and was buried in a grave of honour in Vienna's Feuerhalle Simmering.

Preceded by Hanns Blaschke	Mayor of Vienna; 1945	Succeeded by Theodor Körner
