= Felix Slavik =

Austrian politician and mayor of Vienna (1912 - 1980)

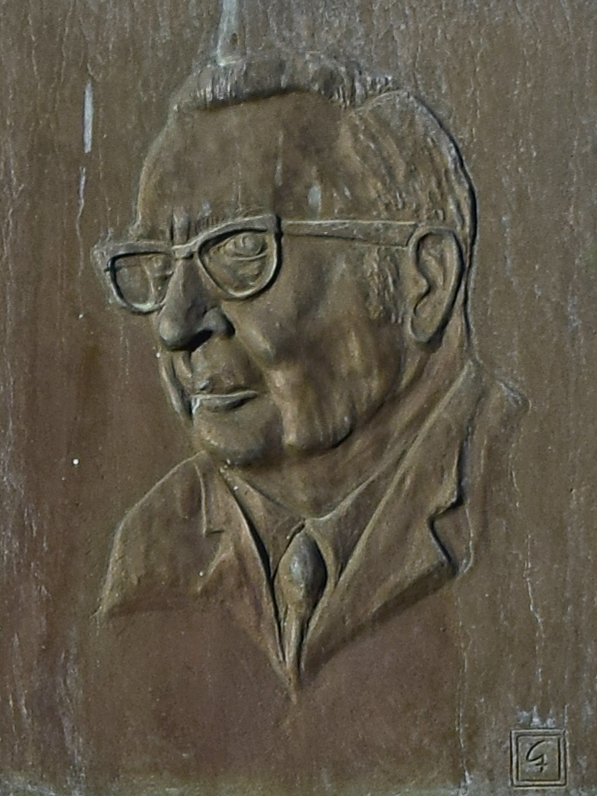
- Ehrengrab at the Vienna Central Cemetery

Mayor and Governor of Vienna
- In office 21 December 1970 – 5 July 1973
- Preceded by: Bruno Marek
- Succeeded by: Leopold Gratz

Personal details
- Born: 3 May 1912 Vienna, Austria-Hungary
- Died: 6 October 1980 (aged 68) Vienna, Austria
- Party: Socialist Party

Felix Slavik (3 May 1912 – 6 October 1980) was an Austrian politician who served as mayor and governor of Vienna from 1970 to 1973 as a member of the Socialist Party.

== Life ==
Slavik was born in Vienna in 1912. During the First World War, his family lived in Austrian-occupied Belgrade. He joined the Socialists (SPÖ) in 1926 and continued working for them even after the party was banned during the Austrofascist era. In 1935, Slavik was imprisoned for over a year in the Wöllersdorf internment camp.

After the Anschluss, Slavik sought contact with other socialist resistors as well as representatives of the Catholic resistance. Together, they discussed the formation of a unified trade union federation. When members of the group were arrested in November 1939, the Gestapo also took notice of Slavik, and he was accused of treason. He was sentenced to 49 months in prison and released in 1943. Around this time, he lost his right eye in a work accident. After his release, he continued resisting the regime, joining the 05 resistance movement.

In 1945, after the liberation of Vienna by Soviet troops, Slavik helped reconstruct the SPÖ. He served as city councillor for housing from 1945 to 1946. He represented Vienna in the Federal Council, the upper house of the Austrian Parliament, from 1946 to 1949, before being elected to the National Council, the lower house. He held this role until 1957, when he returned to Viennese politics and was elected to the Viennese Landtag. From 1957 to 1970, he served as finance minister and as vice mayor from 1959 to 1970. When Mayor Bruno Marek stepped down in 1970, Slavik succeeded him.

Slavik served as mayor until 1973, when he resigned after receiving only two-thirds of the vote in the SPÖ Vienna leadership election. His defeat was partly due to his strong support for the losing side in a referendum on the development of Sternwartepark in Währing. He was succeeded by Leopold Gratz.

Slavik died on 6 October 1980 and was buried in an Ehrengrab in the Central Cemetery. The Felix-Slavik-Straße in Floridsdorf was named in his honour.
