= Hanns Blaschke =

German-Austrian politician (1896–1971)

Hanns Blaschke (1 April 1896 – 25 October 1971) was an Austrian lawyer and politician. A member of the Nazi Party (NSDAP), he served as Bürgermeister (mayor) of Vienna from 30 December 1943 until 6 April 1945. He was convicted of treason after the end of the Second World War, but this judgement was overturned on appeal.

== Early life ==
Blaschke was born in Vienna in 1896. The son of a tax officer, he studied electrical engineering at the Vienna University of Technology. His studies were interrupted in 1914 by the outbreak of World War I. Blaschke fought in the Austro-Hungarian Army until the end of the war and was discharged with the rank of Oberleutnant. He resumed his studies and graduated in 1922 with a degree in engineering. He also studied patent law, passed the state law exam in 1926 and opened his own law firm in 1928.

== Nazi Party career ==
In 1931, Blaschke joined the Austrian Nazi Party and, in mid-1932, he became a department head at the Austrian State Executive Office for Economic Affairs. After participating in the 1934 July Putsch that sought to overthrow the Austrian government, he was sentenced to life imprisonment for treason but was released after two years under the terms of the July Agreement.

In March 1938, Blaschke participated in the annexation of Austria, taking part in the assault on the building of the Fatherland Front. Blaschke joined the Schutzstaffel (SS) on 12 March 1938 (SS number 292,790) and was promoted to SS-Brigadeführer in April 1944. At the April 1938 parliamentary election, he was elected as a deputy to the Reichstag from Ostmark. He was a prominent member of the Nazi administration, becoming a Vienna city councilor, first deputy Bürgermeister and, on 30 December 1943, Bürgermeister. He held this position until 6 April 1945 when the city was under assault from the Red Army during the Vienna offensive.

== Post-war prosecution ==
In 1948, Blaschke was convicted of high treason in Austria. He was sentenced to six years imprisonment and deprivation of property; however this judgement was overturned on appeal in 1958. Blaschke died in Salzburg in 1971.

Preceded by Philipp Wilhelm Jung	Mayor of Vienna; 1943–1945	Succeeded by Rudolf Prikryl
