= Theodor Körner (Austrian politician) =

President of Austria from 1951 to 1957 (1873–1957)

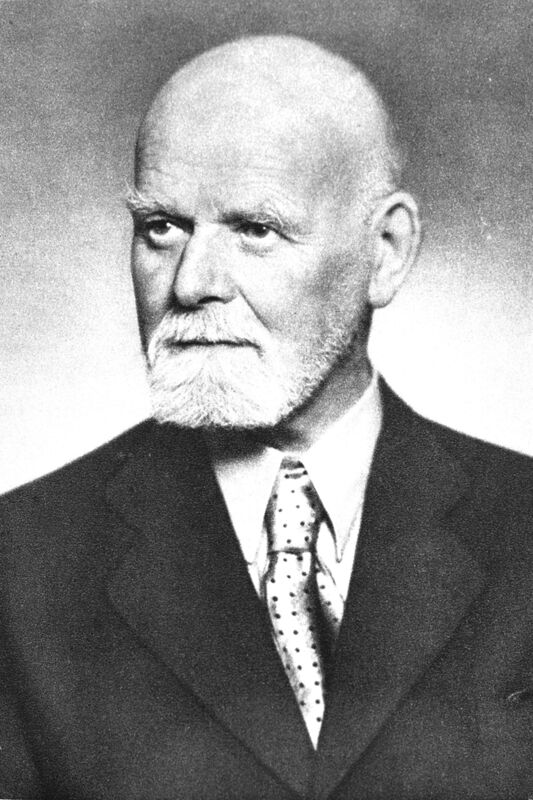
- Colorised photo of Körner in 1951

President of Austria
- In office 21 June 1951 – 4 January 1957
- Chancellor: Leopold Figl; Julius Raab
- Preceded by: Karl Renner
- Succeeded by: Adolf Schärf

Mayor and Governor of Vienna
- In office 17 April 1945 – 18 June 1951
- Preceded by: Rudolf Prikryl
- Succeeded by: Franz Jonas

Chair of the Federal Council
- In office 1 December 1933 – 17 February 1934
- Preceded by: Otto Ender
- Succeeded by: Franz Hemala

Personal details
- Born: 23 April 1873 Újszőny, Austria-Hungary now part of Komárom, Hungary
- Died: 4 January 1957 (aged 83) Vienna, Austria
- Party: Socialist Party

Military service
- Branch/service: Austro-Hungarian Army (1894–1918); Bundesheer (1918–1924)
- Rank: Colonel; General
- Unit: 72nd Infantry Brigade; Levoča Hungarian Infantry Regiment
- Commands: XV and VII Army Corps; First Isonzo Army; Inspector General of the Army
- Battles/wars: World War I; Battles of the Isonzo
- Awards: Austro-Hungarian Military Merit Cross Third Class; Imperial Order of the Iron Crown Third Class; Knight's Cross of the Military Order of Maria Theresa

Theodor Körner, Edler von Siegringen (German pronunciation: [ˈteːoˌdoːɐ̯ ˈkœʁnɐ]; 23 April 1873 – 4 January 1957) was an Austrian military officer and statesman of the Socialist Party of Austria. He served as the president of Austria from 1951 to 1957 and as the mayor of Vienna from 1945 to 1951.

== Early life ==
As son of an officer of the Austro-Hungarian Army, he was born in Újszőny, Kingdom of Hungary (today part of Komárom, Hungary), as the second child of an Artillery Captain, later promoted to major Theodor Karl Körner, Edler von Siegringen (1828-1917) and his wife, Karoline Fousek (1849–1929). He had one older sister, Rosa Antonia (b. 1872) and one younger brother Richard (1874-1915), who later became lieutenant colonel in the Austro-Hungarian Armed Forces during World War I. He was great nephew of poet Theodor Körner and was distantly related to Bertha von Suttner, through her mother, Sophie Wilhelmine von Körner (1815-1884), who was also related to the poet.

== Biography ==
In 1883–1888, Körner lived in Chrastava, where his father was born, and attended the elementary school there. From 1888, he attended the military school in Hranice, graduated at the head of his class as a pioneer from the Imperial and Royal Technical Military Academy, and became lieutenant in 1894. He served as an officer in Agram (today Zagreb, Croatia) and was promoted to major in 1904, in which year he became a member of the Austrian staff. During World War I, he was an active commander on the Italian front. He resigned from his military career in 1924 as a General.

Always interested in politics, he joined the Social Democrats and became a member of parliament in 1924. He served as Chairman of the Federal Council of Austria between December 1933 and February 1934.

Körner was a member of the Technischer Ausschuss (Technical Committee) of the Republikanischer Schutzbund and, alongside Alexander Eifler, considered one of its two leading military strategists. As opposed to Eifler, who favored a more streamlined and classic military organization for the Social-Democratic paramilitary, Körner proposed a strategic outline utilizing guerilla warfare and mass action in the case of a civil war. Eifler was eventually able to assert his strategic views in his struggle with Körner, in the course of which Körner left the technical committee in 1930.

The civil war in Austria and the installation of the austro-fascist dictatorship under Engelbert Dollfuss ended Körner's career as a politician. He was arrested, like other members of his party, by the authoritarian government that banned all opposition parties and put their representatives into prison. During World War II, Körner was again imprisoned, this time by the Nazis.

After the war, in April 1945, Körner became Mayor of Vienna in the newly erected Second Republic. Körner was responsible for rebuilding and reconstructing Vienna, which was heavily destroyed due to the bombing during the war. After the death of Karl Renner, his party nominated Körner as candidate for the presidency, and Körner won the elections with slightly more than 51 percent of the votes. He therefore became the first President of Austria directly elected by the people. Körner died in Vienna, in office, the second consecutive President to do so.

Körner had a profound knowledge of military sciences and wrote about military theory. In Vienna, there is a Gemeindebau and a street named after him, as is the Theodor Körner Prize, an Austrian award for science and art.

A motor vessel, the MS Theodor Körner was built in 1965 and currently operates on the Danube River as a "Bike & Boat" cruise ship, accommodating 135 passengers plus crew.

== Awards ==
- Honorary Doctorate at the Vienna University of Technology (1945)
- Honorary citizen of Vienna city (1948)
- Grand Cross special class of the Order of Merit of the Federal Republic of Germany (1956)

== Sources ==
- Ilona Duczynska: (Hrsg. und kommentiert): Theodor Körner. Auf Vorposten. Ausgewählte Schriften 1928 - 1938. Europaverlag, Wien, 1977, ISBN 3-203-50617-3
- Thea Leitner: Körner aus der Nähe. Danubia Verlag, Wien, 1951.
- Eric C. Kollman: Militär und Politik. VERL.DF.GESCH.U.POL., Wien, 1973.
- Thea Leitner: Hühnerstall und Nobelball. 1938–1955. Leben in Krieg und Frieden. Ueberreuter, Wien, 2004, ISBN 3-8000-3927-3
