= Bruno Marek =

Austrian politician and mayor of Vienna (1900 - 1991)

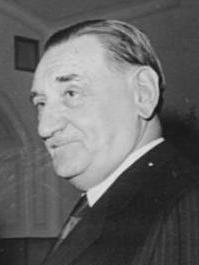

Mayor and Governor of Vienna
- In office 10 June 1965 – 17 December 1970
- Preceded by: Franz Jonas
- Succeeded by: Felix Slavik

Personal details
- Born: 23 January 1900 Vienna, Austria-Hungary
- Died: 29 January 1991 (aged 91) Vienna, Austria
- Party: Socialist Party

Bruno Marek (23 January 1900 – 29 January 1991) was an Austrian politician who served as mayor and governor of Vienna from 1965 to 1970 as a member of the Socialist Party.

== Life ==
Born in Mariahilf, Vienna's 6th district, in 1900, Marek attended a business school before participating in the latter stages of the First World War in 1918. After the war, during the period of Red Vienna, he became involved in the Socialist Party (SPÖ). He worked for the district council of Mariahilf before joining Vienna's trade fair. After the victory of the Austrofascists in the Austrian Civil War, the SPÖ was banned, and Marek was imprisoned.

During the Second World War, Marek opposed the Nazi regime, assisting with resistance efforts in the latter stages of the war. In 1945, he was appointed director of the trade expo, as well as district chairman of Mariahilf. He was elected to the Landtag of Vienna, becoming its president in 1949. After Mayor Franz Jonas was elected President of Austria in 1965, Marek replaced him on 10 June 1965.

During Marek's mayorship, the city planned and began building the U-Bahn, the Spittelau incineration plant, and the fourth Danube bridge, the Praterbrücke. The city also started construction on the New Danube and the Donauinsel and initiated the construction of the UNO-City. Marek stepped down in December 1970, citing age concerns.

In his retirement, Marek led the Archives of the Austrian Resistance. He died on 29 January 1991, shortly after his 91st birthday. The Bruno-Marek-Hof in Mariahilf and the Bruno-Marek-Allee near the Prater in Leopoldstadt were named in his honour. He was buried in an Ehrengrab in the Central Cemetery.
