= Leopold Gratz =

Mayor of Vienna, Austria from 1973 to 1984

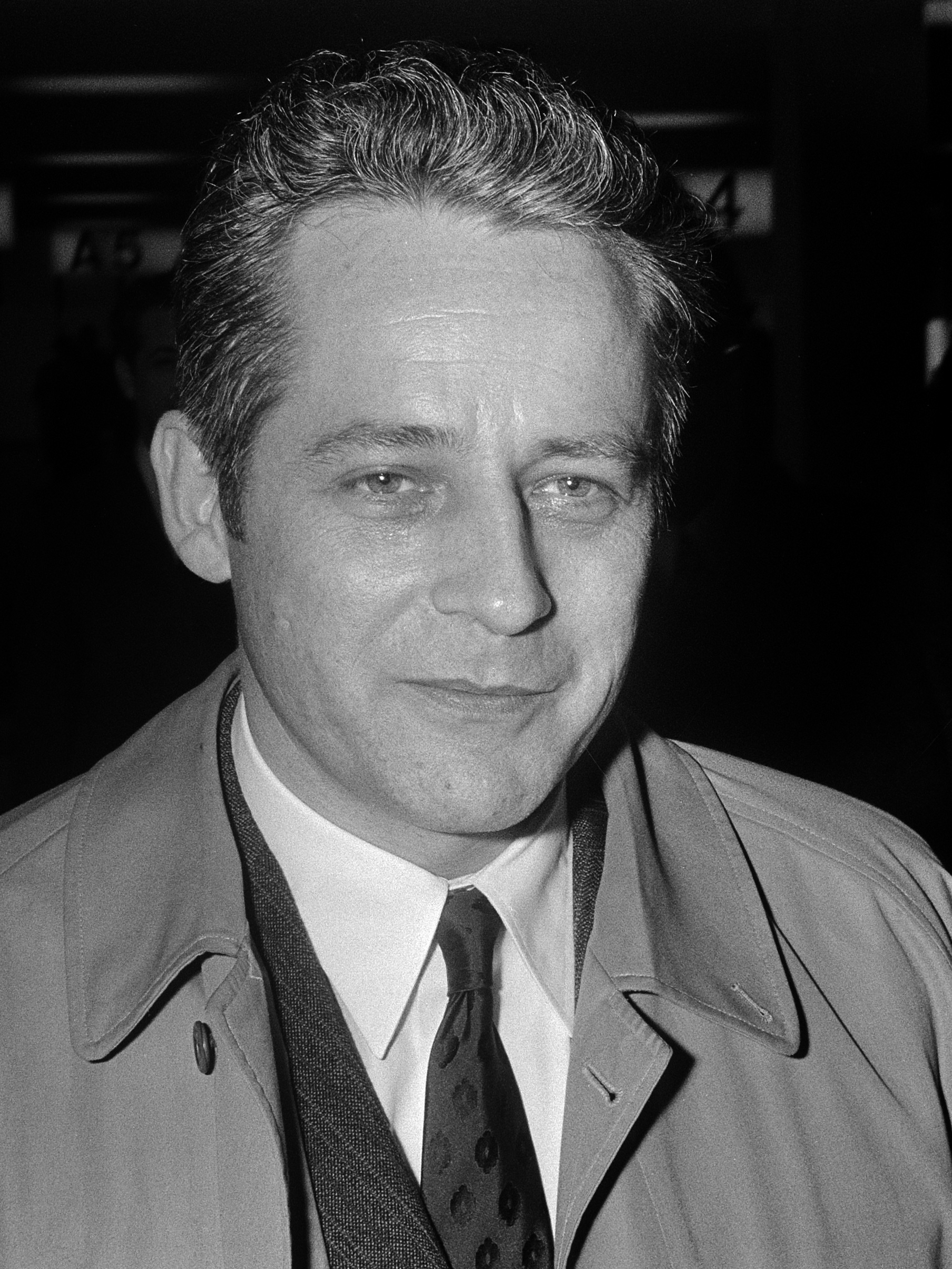

Mayor and Governor of Vienna
- In office 5 July 1973 – 10 September 1984
- Preceded by: Felix Slavik
- Succeeded by: Helmut Zilk

Minister for Foreign Affairs
- In office 10 September 1984 – 16 June 1986

President of the National Council
- In office 17 December 1986 – 23 February 1989

Member of the National Council
- In office 30 March 1966 – 15 June 1973
- In office 17 December 1986 – 23 February 1989

Member of the Federal Council
- In office 25 October 1963 – 30 March 1966

Personal details
- Born: 4 October 1929 Vienna, Austria
- Died: 2 March 2006 (aged 76) Vienna, Austria
- Party: Socialist Party

Leopold Gratz (German: [ˈlɛopolt ˈgʁat͡s]; 4 November 1929 – 2 March 2006) was an Austrian politician who served as mayor and governor of Vienna from 1973 to 1984 as a member of the Socialist Party.

== Life ==
Born in Vienna, Gratz was a law graduate from the University of Vienna and a member of the Austrian Socialist Party (SPÖ). From 1963 to 1966 he was a member of the Bundesrat, from 1970 to 1971 Minister of Education and the Arts. From 1966 to 1973 he served as a member of the National Council of Austria, from 1986 to 1989 as the President of The National Council of Austria, and from 1971 to 1973 as the leader of the Socialist group in the Parliament of Austria.

From 1973 to 1984 he was Mayor of Vienna and head of Vienna's municipal government. In 1976, he became chairman of the Vienna chapter of the Austrian Social Democratic Party. From 1984 to 1986 he was the Minister of Foreign Affairs. From 1986 to 1989 he was the President of the National Council. His term of office as Mayor of Vienna was overshadowed by the "Bauring" affair and the scandal around the construction of the Vienna General Hospital. He decided to resign from the government in 1989 following another scandal, the Udo Proksch affair. Burdening his authority as the second highest politician of the Republic of Austria, Gratz had tried to protect his close friend Udo Proksch, who later was convicted of the murder of six seamen and received a life sentence, from criminal prosecution. After Gratz decided to abandon politics, he remained a member of the party executive committee of the SPÖ Vienna as well as president of the International Conference on Kampuchea (ICK) by request of the United Nations Organization (UNO).

In 1979, Leopold Gratz was named a Knight of the Grand Cross of the Order of Saint Silvester by Pope John Paul II. In 1995, Leopold Gratz was officially made an Honorary Citizen of Vienna. In 2010, a square behind the Austrian parliament in downtown Vienna was named after Leopold Gratz (Leopold-Gratz-Square).

== Awards and honors ==
Grand Cross of the Order of Prince Henry (Portugal) - awarded on 18 April 1984

Political offices
Preceded by Felix Slavik	Mayor of Vienna; 1973 — 1984	Succeeded by Helmut Zilk
