= Helmut Zilk =

Austrian journalist and politician

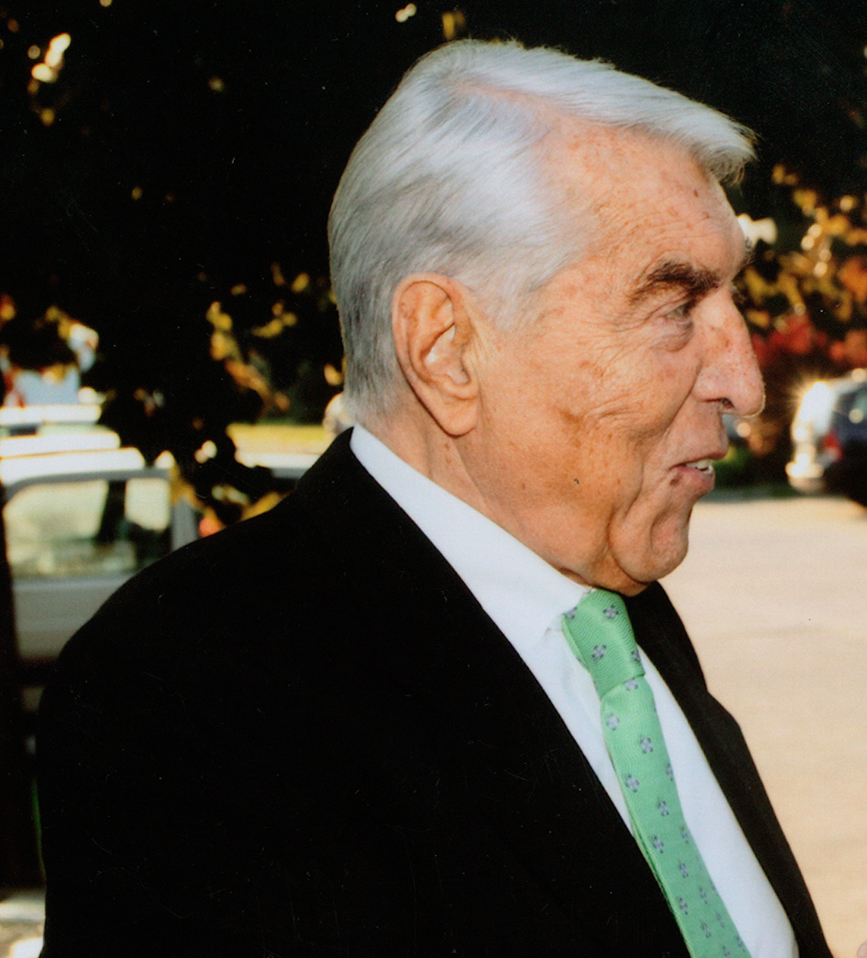
- Helmut Zilk in July 2008

Mayor and Governor of Vienna
- In office 10 September 1984 – 7 November 1994
- Preceded by: Leopold Gratz
- Succeeded by: Michael Häupl

Personal details
- Born: 9 June 1927 Vienna, Austria
- Died: 24 October 2008 (aged 81) Vienna, Austria
- Party: Social Democratic Party
- Spouse: Dagmar Koller

Helmut Zilk (9 June 1927 – 24 October 2008) was an Austrian broadcaster, media executive, and politician in the Austrian Social Democratic Party. He served as mayor of Vienna between 1984 and 1994.

== Biography ==
Helmut Zilk was born in the Favoriten district of Vienna in 1927 to Franz and Stefanie Zilk. Shortly after his birth, the family moved to Łódź in Poland, where his father was a manager at the Harlander Zwirnfabrik. The family subsequently returned to Vienna in 1929, where Franz got a job as a dispatch manager for a city newspaper.

Zilk had a close relationship with his liberal father, who opposed National Socialism and discouraged him from joining the Waffen-SS. Stefanie Zilk was interested in the Viennese arts scene, and she often took her son to see plays and operettas.

Zilk briefly joined the KPÖ (Communist Party of Austria) after the war, but left in 1946 as he found that he did not agree with their ideologies. He eventually joined the SPÖ in 1950. Zilk studied German language and literature, pedagogy, psychology, and philosophy at the University of Vienna. He received his doctorate in philosophy (Dr. phil) in 1951, and subsequently worked in education. In 1955, he passed the teaching examination in pedagogy and began working for Austrian Radio and Television (ORF) part-time as a freelance broadcast journalist.

In 1967, Zilk was appointed program director at ORF. Chancellor Josef Klaus was initially opposed to this appointment, due to Zilk's SPÖ membership, but he agreed to it after Zilk promised to be objective. Zilk left ORF in 1974 to take up a role as ombudsman for the Kronen Zeitung newspaper. He was appointed Vienna City Councillor for Cultural Affairs in 1979. Zilk had a brief stint as Minister for Education and Culture from 1983 to 1984.

Zilk was Mayor of Vienna from 1984 to 1994. In December 1993, he was severely injured when he opened a letter bomb which had been sent to his home in Innere Stadt by Franz Fuchs. He lost two fingers in the incident.

After retiring from politics, he joined the board of Wiener Städtische Insurance, and returned to ORF as a broadcaster where he presented the talk show "Lebenskünstler" from 1995 to 2008.

Zilk died on 24 October 2008 of heart failure, after returning home ill from a holiday in Portugal. He was married three times and had one son from his second marriage. He married Austrian musical theatre star, Dagmar Koller in 1978 with whom he remained married until his death.

=== Collaboration with Czech State Security (StB) ===
In October 1998, the Süddeutsche Zeitung reported that Helmut Zilk had collaborated with Czechoslovak secret police (StB) during the 1960s. Zilk denied the allegations. The controversy, together with information contained in the StB archives, led the Czech authorities to cancel a planned state honour for Zilk. The affair received extensive coverage in the Czech and Austrian media. The Czech presidential office stated it had found no basis for the allegations, and President Havel personally apologized to him.

In 2009, previously classified StB documents concerning Zilk were made public. It was recorded that Zilk met StB agents 58 times between 1965–68, during which he provided information on Austrian political affairs and received money and gifts in return. Zilk was given the codename "Holec", and StB records included receipts signed under the covername Johann Maiz.

After the Soviet occupation of Czechoslovakia, StB agent Ladislav Bittman defected to the West and disclosed information about Zilk.

The Zilk & StB affair was later fictionalised in the 2016 Austrian-Czech film Deckname Holec (Codename Holec), directed by Franz Novotny. Set during the Prague Spring and the Soviet invasion of Czechoslovakia in 1968, the film depicts a fictionalised account of Zilk becoming entangled with the StB and a love triangle with a Czech film director and actress.

=== Honours ===
- 1967: Golden Camera award
- 1989: Grand Decoration of Honour in Gold with Star for Services to the State of Vienna
- 1991: Honorary Senator, University of Vienna
- 1994: Honorary Citizen of the City of Prague
- 1995: Honorary Citizen of the City of Vienna
- 2001: Grand Cross with Star of the Order of Merit of the Federal Republic of Germany
- 2001: Grand Cross of the Order of St. Gregory the Great
- 2010: the former Albertina square in central Vienna was renamed to Helmut Zilk Square

Political offices
Preceded by: Leopold Gratz	Mayor of Vienna; 1984–1994	Succeeded by: Michael Häupl
