= Jakob Reumann =

Mayor of Vienna in the First Austrian Republic

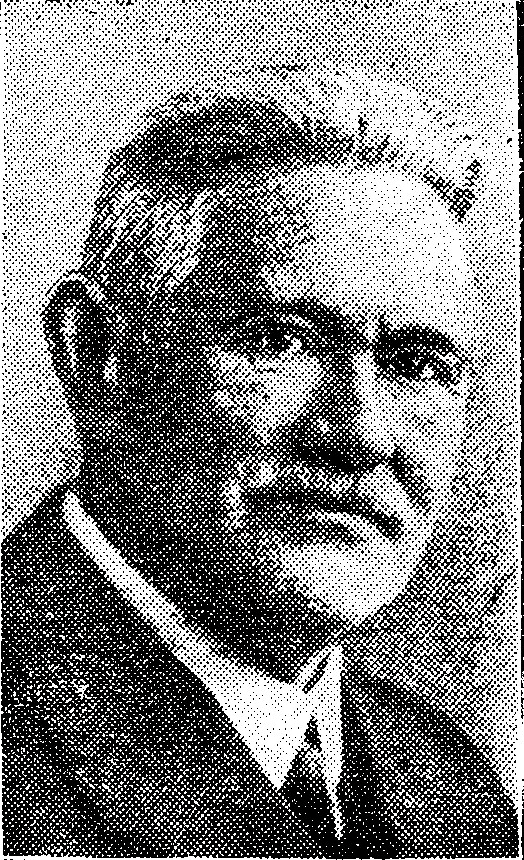
Jakob Reumann

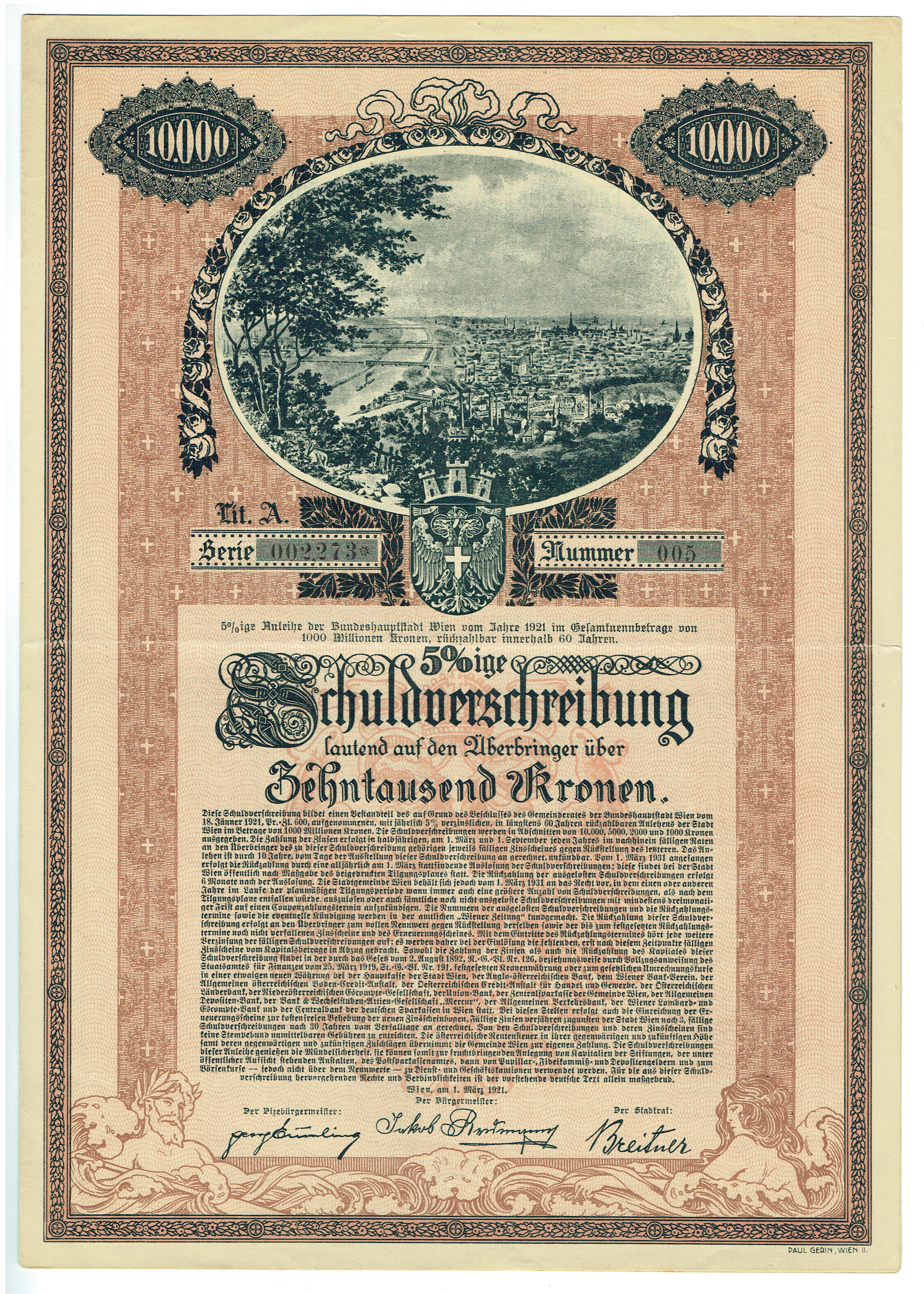
Bond of Vienna, issued 1 March 1921, signed by Mayor Jakob Reumann

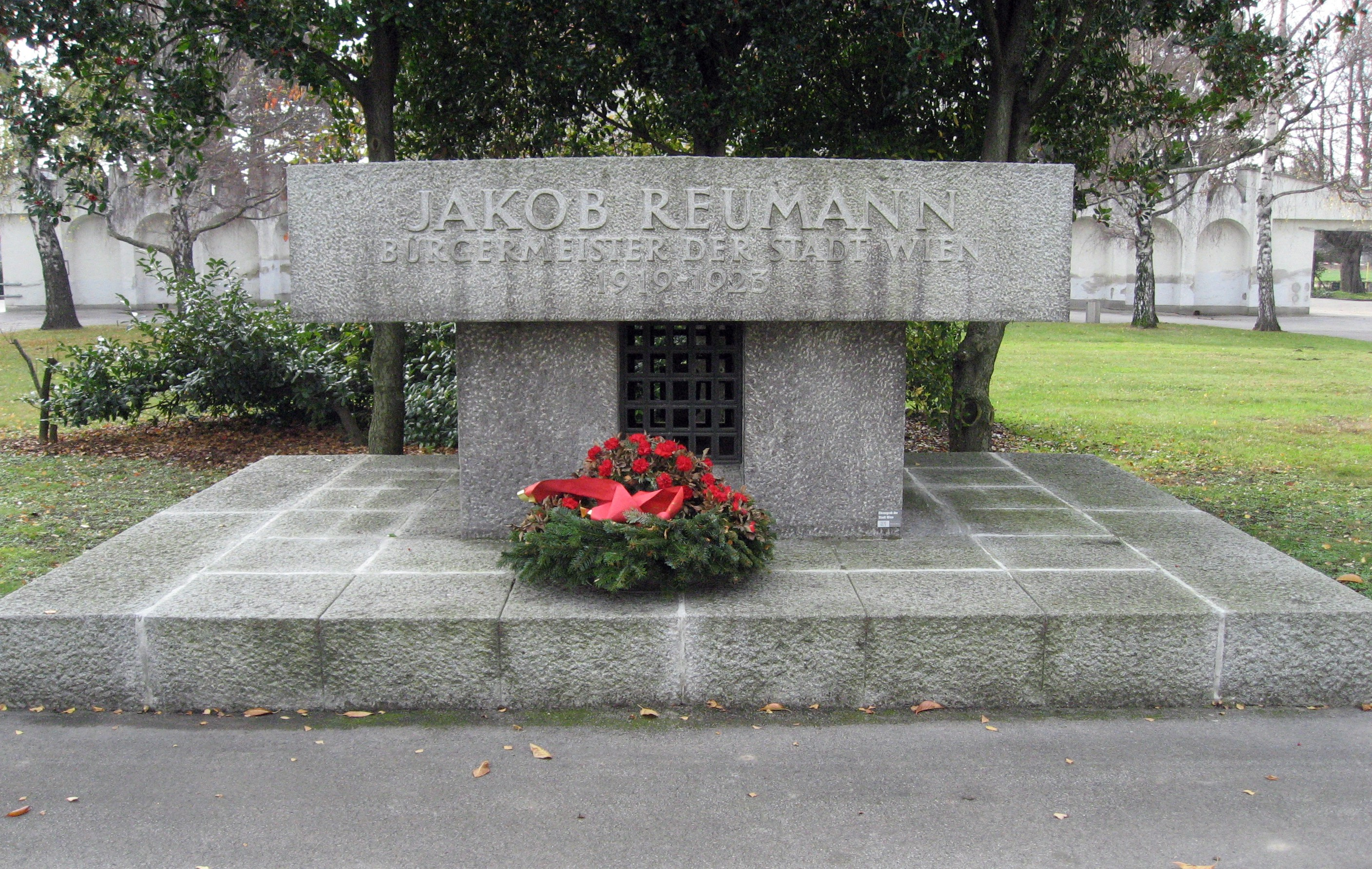
Grave of Jakob Reumann

Jakob Reumann (31 December 1853 in Vienna – 29 July 1925 in Klagenfurt) was an Austrian Social Democratic politician and the first social democratic mayor of Vienna from 1919 to 1923.

== Biography ==
On the Hainfeld Party Convention of 1888/1889, Jakob Reumann was designated first secretary of the newly founded Social Democratic Party, which then united social democrats of the whole multinational Austrian part of Austria-Hungary. From 1900, he has been elected member of Vienna's Gemeinderat (city parliament), from 1907 member of the Austrian Reichsrat (parliament). In 1917 city councillor, in 1918 vice-mayor, he was elected mayor on 21 May 1919, the first social democratic mayor in the history of Vienna. 1918/1919 he was also a member of the Provisional National Council of German Austria (Provisorische Nationalversammlung für Deutschösterreich).

In 1922, as mayor he became Landeshauptmann (governor) of the new State of Vienna. The same year saw the opening of Feuerhalle Simmering, the first crematorium in Austria. Reumann had to defend this decision at the Constitutional Court as he had granted building permission for the crematorium against the order of a federal minister from the Christian Social Party. He was the president of the Federal Council of Austria in 1920s.

In 1923, the Gemeinderat concluded on the first large housing programme to build 25,000 flats within five years. On 13 November 1923 Jakob Reumann stepped down as mayor and was made honorary citizen of Vienna. His ashes are buried at Feuerhalle Simmering in Vienna. A few weeks after his death in 1925, in the tenth district, Favoriten, a workers' district where Reumann had his personal roots, a square was named Reumannplatz. Today it is the namesake station of the underground line no. 1 and the site of attractive Amalienbad (Amalia Spa).

== See also ==
- List of members of the Austrian Parliament who died in office

Government offices
Preceded by Richard Weiskirchner	Mayor of Vienna; 1919–1923	Succeeded by Karl Seitz
