= 2025 Viennese state election =

Election in Vienna, Austria

- 27 April 2025

All 100 seats in the Gemeinderat and Landtag of Vienna 51 seats needed for a majority All 13 seats in the state government
- Turnout: 696,345 (62.7%) ▼2.5%
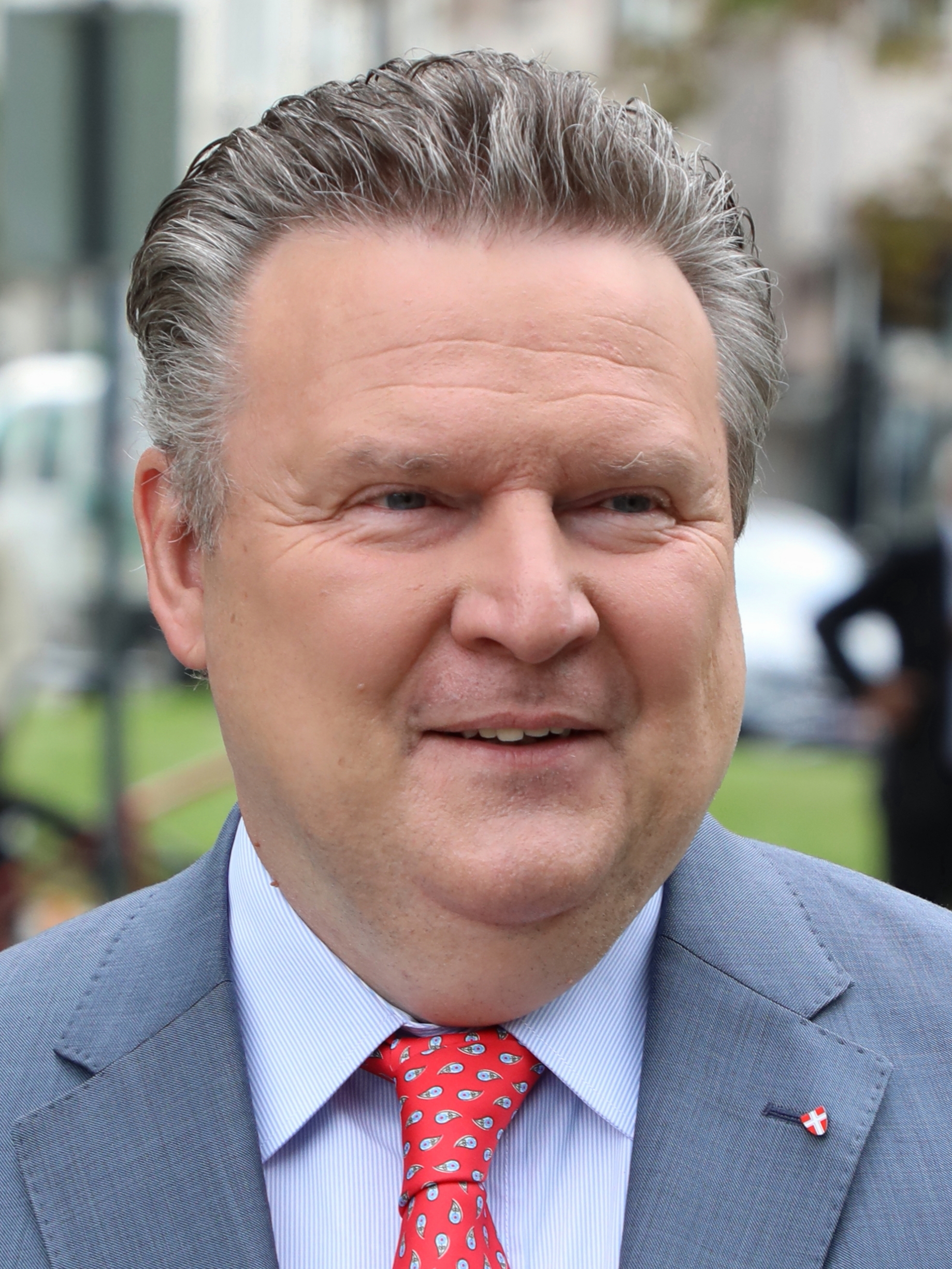

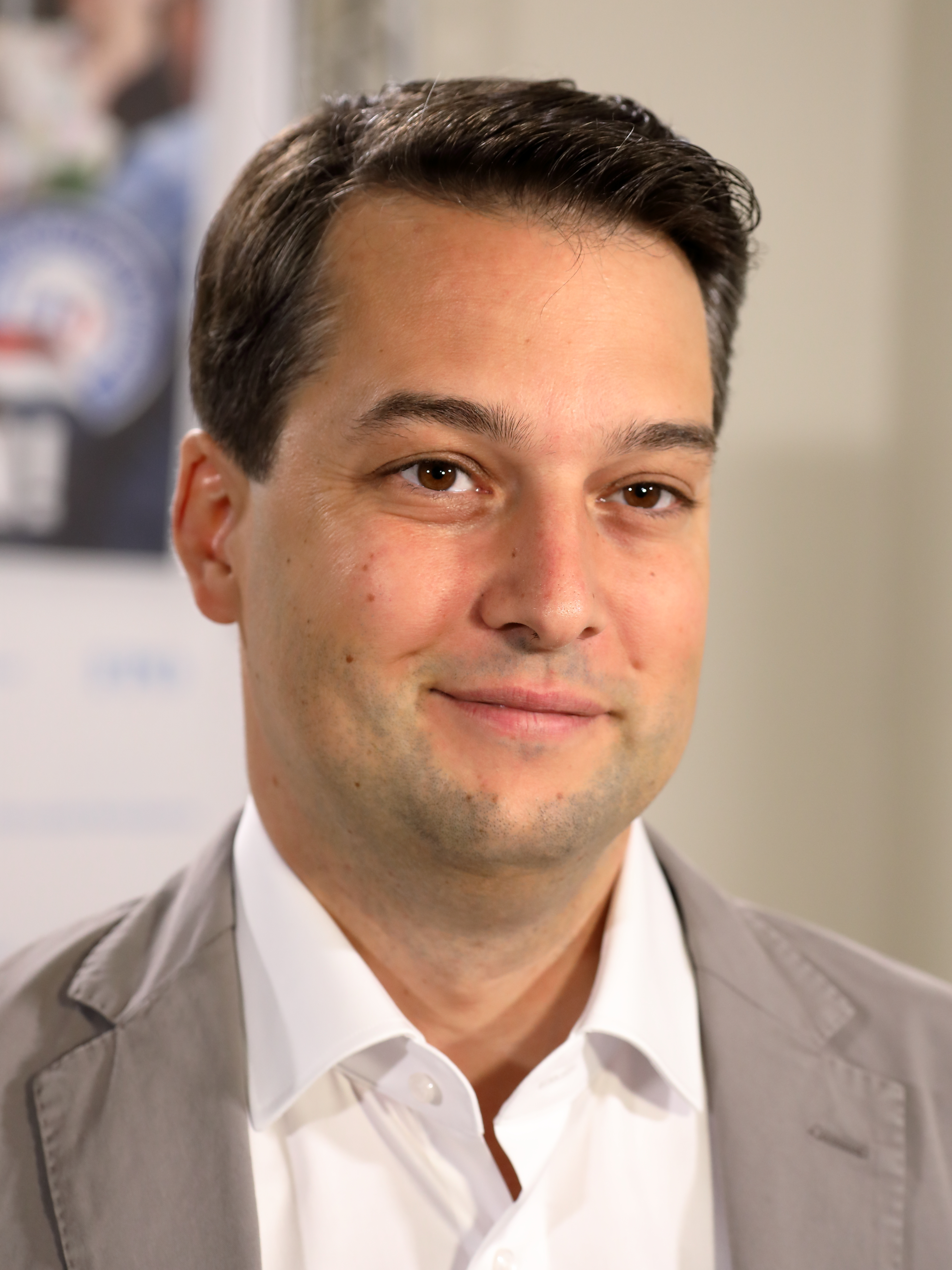

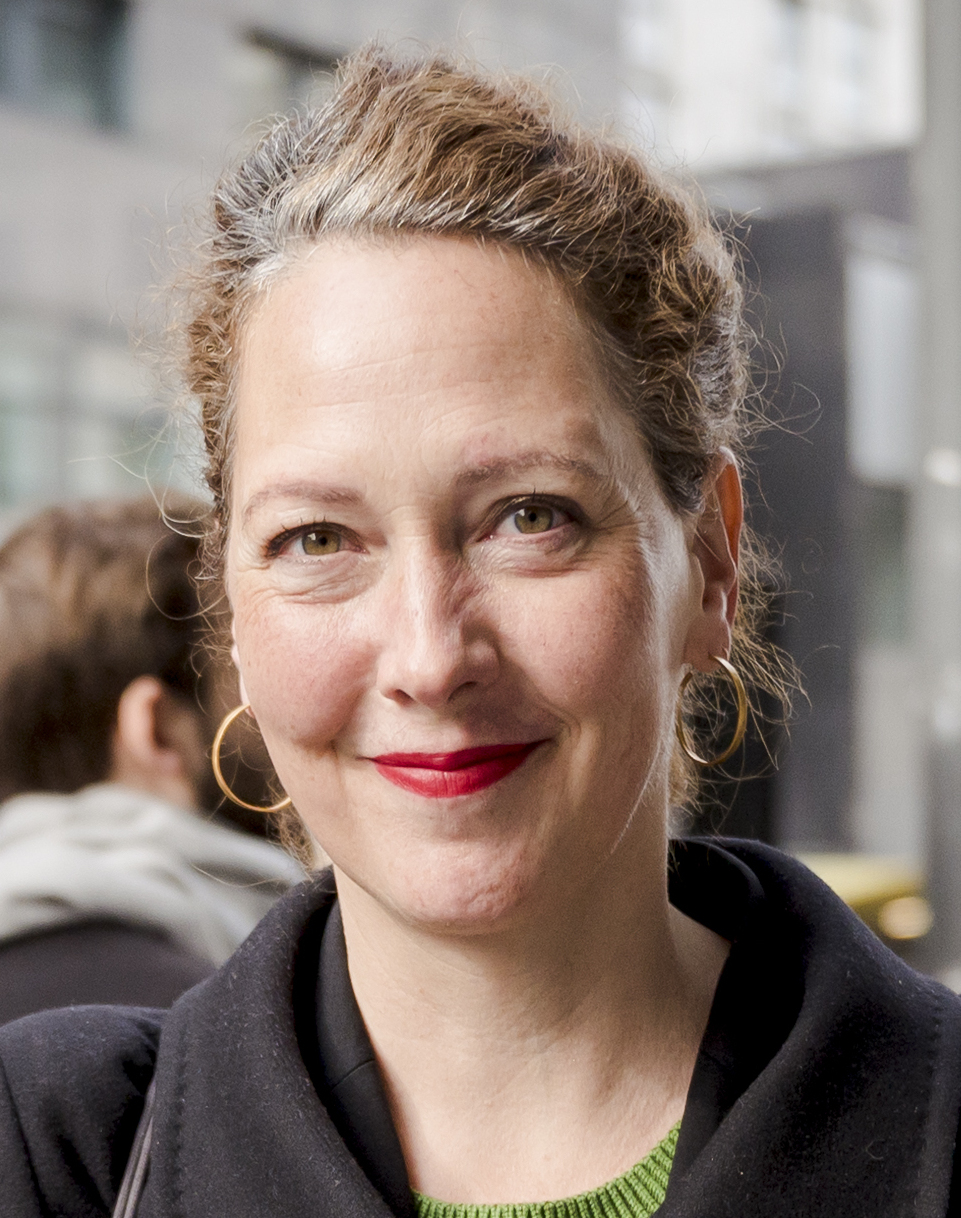
| | First party | Second party | Third party |
|---|---|---|---|
| Candidate | Michael Ludwig | Dominik Nepp | Judith Pühringer |
| Party | SPÖ | FPÖ | Greens |
| Last election | 46 seats, 41.6% | 8 seats, 7.1% | 16 seats, 14.8% |
| Seats won | 43 | 22 | 15 |
| Seat change | ▼3 | ▲14 | ▼1 |
| Popular vote | 268,514 | 138,761 | 98,995 |
| Percentage | 39.4% | 20.4% | 14.5% |
| Swing | ▼2.2pp | ▲13.2pp | ▼0.3pp |
| | Fourth party | Fifth party |
| Candidate | Selma Arapović | Karl Mahrer |
| Party | NEOS | ÖVP |
| Last election | 8 seats, 7.5% | 22 seats, 20.4% |
| Seats won | 10 | 10 |
| Seat change | ▲2 | ▼12 |
| Popular vote | 68,152 | 65,820 |
| Percentage | 10.0% | 9.7% |
| Swing | ▲2.5pp | ▼10.8pp |
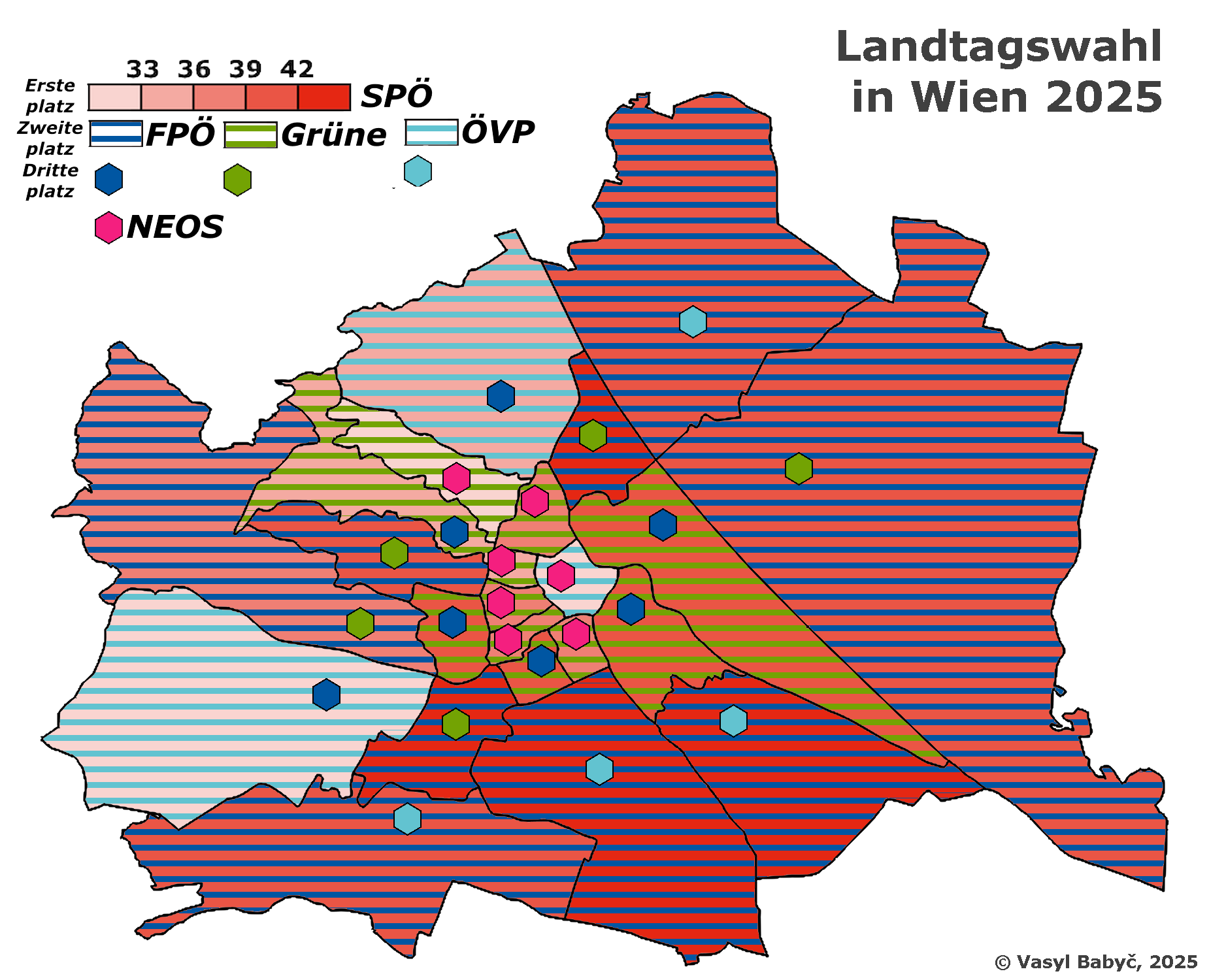
Mayor and Governor before election
Michael Ludwig
SPÖ
Elected Mayor and Governor
Michael Ludwig
SPÖ

The 2025 Viennese state election was held to elect the members of the Gemeinderat and Landtag of Vienna on 27 April 2025.

== Background ==
In the 2020 state election, the SPÖ under mayor Michael Ludwig was able to improve its 2015 result after the downward trend of the last elections and again became the strongest party with 41.6%. The Greens under Birgit Hebein also improved and achieved their best result so far in Vienna with 14.8%. The NEOS under Christoph Wiederkehr also recorded small gains and reached 7.5%. After suffering its worst result ever in 2015, the ÖVP was now able to more than double its share of the vote and received 20.4%; their lead candidate was former Federal Finance Minister Gernot Blümel. The FPÖ under Dominik Nepp lost more than two thirds of its vote share and reached 7.1%, its worst result since the state and municipal elections in 1983. The newly founded Team HC Strache – Alliance for Austria received 3.3% of the vote, which was below the electoral threshold, and thus failed to get any seats, as did the small parties LINKS with 2.1%, the Beer Party with 1.8%, and SÖZ with 1.2%. Other small parties played no significant role.

In 2020, a total of 1,133,010 people were eligible to vote, of whom 597,027 were women and 535,983 men. Voter turnout fell sharply to 65.27%, but this was still a higher turnout than in the 2005 state election, which had the lowest voter turnout to date with 60.81%.

The share of absentee votes that ended up being counted reached a new high of 28.34% among all eligible voters in the wake of the coronavirus pandemic, meaning that more than 43 percent of all votes cast were by absentee ballot.

After exploratory talks between the mayoral party SPÖ with the ÖVP, the Greens and NEOS, the SPÖ surprisingly decided to start coalition negotiations with the NEOS instead of the previous coalition partner, the Greens. A coalition with the ÖVP was rejected due to little agreement on topics. A coalition with the FPÖ was rejected outright by the SPÖ.

On 16 November 2020, the first contents of the new coalition agreement were presented. On 24 November 2020, Michael Ludwig (SPÖ) was re-elected as mayor with 60 out of 100 votes – 54 of them from the new coalition – and the new city government was sworn in by Federal President Alexander Van der Bellen.

A 5% threshold applies to state and municipal elections in Vienna. In the past, the NEOS have campaigned for lowering it to 3%.

== Statistics ==
A total of 1,109,936 Austrian citizens who are at least 16 years old on election day will be eligible to vote, a slight decrease from the 1,133,010 in the previous state election in 2020. The number of voting-eligible Austrian citizens is declining for years, despite Vienna growing by more than 110,000 people between 2020 and 2025, in large parts because of non-citizen immigrants. The voting-eligible citizen population is declining because of more deaths than births among citizens and a negative migration balance to other Austrian states and countries, which is not compensated by enough naturalisations of non-citizens. 36% of Viennese older than 16 are not eligible to vote in the election due to lack of Austrian citizenship.

A total of 265,328 absentee ballots were issued for the election, or 23.9% of eligible voters. The number is much smaller than absentee ballots requested for the 2020 election, because of the Coronavirus pandemic at the time - and therefore cannot be compared. It can be compared however to the Austrian legislative election in 2024 in Vienna, when 288,156 absentee ballots were issued in Vienna to eligible Austrian voters living in the city (excl. Austrians abroad) - or 25.9% of eligible Austrian voters living in Vienna.

== Contesting parties ==
The table below lists parties represented in the current Gemeinderat and Landtag.

| Name | | Ideology | Party leader(s) | 2020 result | | |
| Name | | Ideology | Party leader(s) | Votes (%) | Seats | Councillors |
|---|---|---|---|---|---|---|
| SPÖ | Social Democratic Party of Austria; Sozialdemokratische Partei Österreichs | Social democracy | Michael Ludwig | 41.6% | 46 / 100 | 7 / 13 |
| ÖVP | Austrian People's Party; Österreichische Volkspartei | Conservatism | Karl Mahrer | 20.4% | 22 / 100 | 2 / 13 |
| GRÜNE | The Greens – The Green Alternative; Die Grünen – Die Grüne Alternative | Green politics | Judith Pühringer; Peter Kraus | 14.8% | 16 / 100 | 2 / 13 |
| NEOS | NEOS – The New Austria and Liberal Forum; NEOS – Das Neue Österreich und Liberales Forum | Liberalism | Christoph Wiederkehr | 7.5% | 8 / 100 | 1 / 13 |
| FPÖ | Freedom Party of Austria; Freiheitliche Partei Österreichs | National conservatism Right-wing populism | Dominik Nepp | 7.1% | 8 / 100 | 1 / 13 |

The following additional parties/lists will appear on the ballot in all 17 constituencies:

1. KPÖ und LINKS - Kommunistische Partei Österreichs und LINKS Wien - (short ballot abbreviation: KPÖ)
2. Team HC Strache - Allianz für Österreich - (short ballot abbreviation: HC)

The following additional parties/lists will appear on the ballot only in some of the 17 constituencies:

1. Soziales Österreich der Zukunft - (short ballot abbreviation: SÖZ) - (in 14/17 constituencies)
2. Pro 23 für ein lebenswertes und zukunftsfittes Liesing - (short ballot abbreviation: PRO) - (in 1/17 constituencies)
3. Plattform Obdachlos - Armut - Arbeitslos - Teuerung - (short ballot abbreviation: HERZ) - (in 1/17 constituencies)

== Opinion polling ==

=== Recent opinion polling ===
The poll aggregator Europe Elects lists INSA, Market, Market/Lazarsfeld, Peter Hajek Public Opinion Strategies, Foresight Research Hofinger GmbH, Spectra, Unique Research GmbH, IFDD, DEMOX, OGM, GfK, IMAS, Triple M Matzka and IMAD in its database as reliable pollsters in Austria.

| Polling firm/Client | Fieldwork date | Sample size | SPÖ | ÖVP | Grüne | NEOS | FPÖ | HC | KPÖ | Others | Lead |
|---|---|---|---|---|---|---|---|---|---|---|---|
| 2025 state election | 27 Apr 2025 | – | 39.4 | 9.7 | 14.5 | 10.0 | 20.4 | 1.1 | 4.1 | 0.9 | 19.0 |
| Market-Lazarsfeld/oe24.at | 26–27 April 2025 | 784 | 37-38 | 11-12 | 13-14 | 8-9 | 22-23 | – | 4-5 | 2-3 | 15 |
| OGM/ServusTV | 25–27 April 2025 | 1,000 | 37.5 | 11.0 | 12.5 | 9.5 | 22.0 | 2.5 | 3.5 | 1.5 | 15.5 |
| Foresight/Hajek/ORF/APA/ATV/Puls24 | 17–26 April 2025 | 3,764 | 37.0 | 11.5 | 12.5 | 8.5 | 23.5 | 1.5 | 4.0 | 1.5 | 13.5 |
| Market-Lazarsfeld/oe24.at | 17–20 April 2025 | 845 | 37 | 11 | 13 | 9 | 23 | – | 4 | 3 | 14 |
| IFDD/krone.at | 15–18 April 2025 | 1,000 | 38 | 11 | 13 | 9 | 22 | 2 | 4 | 1 | 16 |
| Market/derStandard.at | 7–10 April 2025 | 802 | 38 | 11 | 12 | 11 | 21 | 2 | 4 | 1 | 17 |
| Unique Research/Heute/ATV/Puls24 | 3–10 April 2025 | 1,200 | 39 | 11 | 12 | 9 | 22 | 2 | 4 | 1 | 17 |
| OGM/Kurier | 4–9 April 2025 | 917 | 39 | 12 | 12 | 9 | 21 | 2 | 3 | 2 | 18 |
| Triple M/news.at | 28 March–7 April 2025 | 1,000 | 40 | 10 | 11 | 10 | 23 | 1 | 4 | 1 | 17 |
| IFDD/Vienna Green Party | 28 March–1 April 2025 | 1,000 | 39 | 12 | 12 | 9 | 21 | 2 | 4 | 1 | 18 |
| Market-Lazarsfeld/oe24.at | 27–31 March 2025 | 836 | 38 | 10 | 12 | 9 | 24 | – | 4 | 3 | 14 |
| IFDD/w24.at | 21–24 March 2025 | 1,000 | 40 | 11 | 12 | 9 | 21 | 2 | 4 | 1 | 19 |
| IFDD/krone.at | 11–15 March 2025 | 1,000 | 40 | 10 | 12 | 9 | 22 | 2 | 4 | 1 | 18 |
| 2020 state election | 11 Oct 2020 | – | 41.6 | 20.4 | 14.8 | 7.5 | 7.1 | 3.3 | 2.1 (Note: as LINKS) | 3.2 | 21.2 |

An unscientific, non-representative mock vote of both people who have Austrian citizenship and don't have Austrian citizenship (and therefore can't vote in the Viennese election) found that 47.7% would vote for SPÖ, 19.3% for the Greens, 14.3% for KPÖ, 8.1% for FPÖ, 5.2% for ÖVP, 4.7% for NEOS, and 0.7% for HC. About 60 percent of the 9.797 people voting in the unscientific, non-representative mock vote had Austrian citizenship. This so-called "passport doesn't matter"-poll was organized by the human rights NGO "SOS Mitmensch".

=== Older opinion polling ===
| Polling firm/Client | Fieldwork date | Sample size | SPÖ | ÖVP | Grüne | NEOS | FPÖ | KPÖ | BIER | MFG | Others | Lead |
|---|---|---|---|---|---|---|---|---|---|---|---|---|
| Unique Research/HEUTE | 27–30 Jan 2025 | 800 | 40 | 10 | 11 | 9 | 23 | 4 | 1 | – | 2 | 17 |
| Market-Lazarsfeld/oe24.at | 20–22 Jan 2025 | 800 | 36 | 12 | 16 | 10 | 20 | 4 | 1 | – | 1 | 16 |
| IFDD/W24 | 4–6 Dec 2024 | 1,000 | 37 | 11 | 12 | 10 | 22 | 4 | 3 | – | 1 | 15 |
| Market/DER STANDARD | 6–12 Aug 2024 | 771 | 36 | 15 | 10 | 9 | 19 | 3 | 7 | – | 1 | 17 |
| IFDD/W24 | 24–27 Jun 2024 | 1,000 | 36 | 12 | 12 | 8 | 19 | 4 | 7 | – | 2 | 17 |
| IFDD/W24 | 21–26 Mar 2024 | 1,000 | 36 | 11 | 11 | 8 | 21 | 4 | 8 | – | 1 | 15 |
| IFDD/W24 | 14–19 Dec 2023 | 1,026 | 37 | 11 | 11 | 8 | 21 | 3 | 7 | – | 2 | 16 |
| Unique Research/HEUTE | 2–5 Oct 2023 | 813 | 35 | 10 | 8 | 8 | 23 | 3 | 12 | – | 1 | 12 |
| IFDD/WH Media | 3–5 Jun 2023 | 1,000 | 40 | 13 | 11 | 7 | 20 | 3 | 6 | – | 0 | 20 |
| IFDD/WH Media | 1–7 Mar 2023 | 1,000 | 41 | 13 | 11 | 7 | 20 | – | 6 | – | 2 | 21 |
| IFDD/WH Media | 25–29 Nov 2022 | 1,000 | 42 | 11 | 9 | 7 | 19 | – | 8 | – | 4 | 23 |
| IFDD/WH Media | 5–9 Sep 2022 | 1,000 | 42 | 11 | 10 | 8 | 16 | – | 8 | 2 | 3 | 23 |
| TCS-Heuritsch/n.a. | Jun 2022 | 1,000 | 47 | 10 | 10 | 8 | 18 | – | – | 4 | 3 | 22 |
| IFDD/WH Media | 25–28 Apr 2022 | 1,250 | 47 | 11 | 10 | 9 | 14 | – | 5 | 3 | 1 | 21 |
| IFDD/Kronen Zeitung | 21–25 Feb 2022 | 800 | 46 | 12 | 9 | 8 | 14 | – | 6 | 4 | 1 | 23 |
| OGM/Kurier | 22–24 Feb 2022 | 802 | 47 | 13 | 11 | 8 | 13 | – | 3 | 3 | 2 | 19 |
| Market/DER STANDARD | 3–7 Feb 2022 | 805 | 46 | 14 | 13 | 10 | 9 | – | – | 3 | 5 | 28 |
| IFDD/WH Media/W24 | 12–16 Dec 2022 | 1,250 | 45 | 12 | 10 | 9 | 14 | – | – | – | 10 | 31 |
| IFDD/Kronen Zeitung | 4–9 Oct 2021 | 1,000 | 45 | 13 | 11 | 9 | 16 | – | – | – | 6 | 29 |
| Triple M Matzka/W24 | 19–27 Aug 2021 | 1,004 | 45 | 15 | 11 | 11 | 15 | – | – | – | 3 | 30 |
| Peter Hajek/SPÖ Wien | 16–20 Jul 2021 | 800 | 45 | 16 | 10 | 9 | 15 | – | – | – | 5 | 29 |
| Triple M Matzka/W24 | 27 May–4 Jun 2021 | 1,018 | 46 | 15 | 11 | 11 | 13 | – | – | – | 4 | 31 |
| IFDD/Kronen Zeitung | 15–22 Apr 2021 | 803 | 46 | 16 | 9 | 10 | 14 | – | – | – | 5 | 30 |
| Triple M Matzka/W24 | 26 Mar–5 Apr 2021 | 1,014 | 46 | 16 | 11 | 11 | 13 | – | – | – | 3 | 30 |
| Research Affairs/TZ Österreich | 6–8 Apr 2021 | 500 | 45 | 17 | 9 | 10 | 13 | – | – | – | 6 | 28 |
| Unique Research/SPÖ Wien | 19–25 Feb 2021 | 800 | 46 | 19 | 9 | 9 | 12 | – | – | – | 5 | 27 |
| Triple M Matzka/W24 | 5–14 Jan 2021 | 1,009 | 44 | 18 | 12 | 9 | 12 | – | – | – | 5 | 26 |
| OGM/Kurier | 18–19 Nov 2020 | 800 | 43 | 19 | 13 | 10 | 8 | – | – | – | 7 | 24 |
| 2020 state election | 11 Oct 2020 | – | 41.6 | 20.4 | 14.8 | 7.5 | 7.1 | 2.1 | 1.8 | – | 4.5 | 21.2 |

=== Projected turnout ===
- 68 % (stating that "I will certainly vote.") - ORF/Foresight
- 70 % (stating that "I will certainly vote.") - oe24.at/Market-Lazarsfeld

Sources: https://wien.orf.at/stories/3302404/ and https://www.youtube.com/watch?v=bHjfFoRSRJs

== Results ==
2025 Viennese state election
| Party | Votes | % | +/– | Seats | +/– |
|---|---|---|---|---|---|
| Social Democratic Party of Austria (SPÖ) | 268,514 | 39.38 | –2.24 | 43 | –3 |
| Freedom Party of Austria (FPÖ) | 138,761 | 20.35 | +13.24 | 22 | +14 |
| The Greens – The Green Alternative (GRÜNE) | 98,995 | 14.52 | –0.28 | 15 | –1 |
| NEOS – The New Austria (NEOS) | 68,152 | 10.00 | +2.53 | 10 | +2 |
| Austrian People's Party (ÖVP) | 65,820 | 9.65 | –10.78 | 10 | –12 |
| Communist Party of Austria and LINKS (KPÖ) | 27,657 | 4.06 | +2.00 | 0 | 0 |
| Team HC Strache – Alliance for Austria (HC) | 7,533 | 1.10 | –2.17 | 0 | 0 |
| Social Austria of the Future (SÖZ) | 5,737 | 0.84 | –0.36 | 0 | 0 |
| Pro23 (PRO) | 525 | 0.08 | +0.03 | 0 | 0 |
| Plattform Obdachlos (HERZ) | 114 | 0.02 | new | 0 | 0 |
| Total | 681,808 | 100.00 | – | 100 | 0 |
| Valid votes | 681,808 | 97.91 | –0.20 | | |
| Invalid/blank votes | 14,537 | 2.09 | +0.20 | | |
| Total votes | 696,345 | 100.00 | – | | |
| Registered voters/turnout | 1,109,936 | 62.74 | –2.53 | | |
Source: Viennese Government (Results tables) Viennese Government (Press release of the official certified results)

Party strength by administrative district

SPÖ

FPÖ

ÖVP

Greens

NEOS

== Government Formation ==
In May 2025, after the SPÖ held talks with multiple parties it was made known that they would work with the NEOS.
