= Michael Ludwig =

Austrian politician

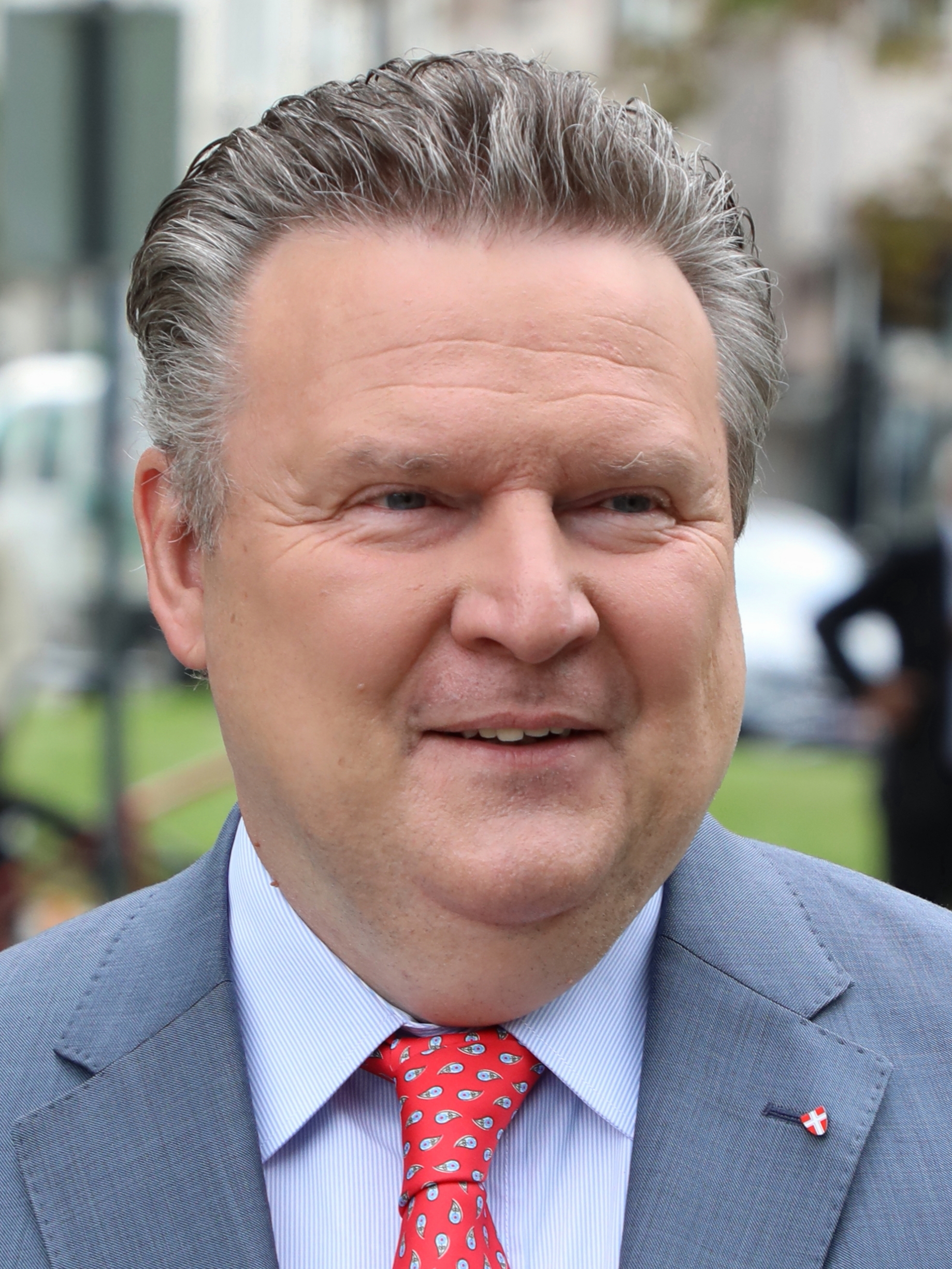
- Ludwig in 2020

Mayor and Governor of Vienna
- Incumbent
- Assumed office 24 May 2018
- Deputy: Maria Vassilakou; Birgit Hebein; Christoph Wiederkehr; Bettina Emmerling
- Preceded by: Michael Häupl

Chairman of the Social Democratic Party of Vienna
- Incumbent
- Assumed office 27 January 2018
- Preceded by: Michael Häupl
- In office 26 March 2009 – 25 November 2010
- Governor: Michael Häupl

City Councillor for Housing, Construction, and Urban Renewal
- In office 22 January 2007 – 24 May 2018
- Governor: Michael Häupl

Personal details
- Born: 3 April 1961 (age 65) Vienna, Austria
- Party: Social Democratic
- Spouse: Irmtraud Rossgatterer (m. 2018)

Michael Ludwig (born 3 April 1961) is an Austrian politician of the Social Democratic Party (SPÖ). Since 2018, he has been Mayor and Governor of Vienna, the capital and largest city of Austria.

== Early life ==
Ludwig grew up in Vienna's 21st district, Floridsdorf, living in a Gemeindebau (municipal housing estate). He grew up under the governments of SPÖ Chancellor Bruno Kreisky, who he cites as his political idol. He studied political science and history at the University of Vienna and was awarded a doctorate in 1992 with a dissertation on the Socialist Unity Party of Germany, the then-ruling party of East Germany.

== Political career ==
Ludwig began his career in local politics in Vienna as a district councillor in Floridsdorf from 1994 to 1995. From 1996 to 1999, he served as a representative on the Federal Council, the upper house of the Austrian parliament. In 1999, he entered the Municipal Council and Landtag of Vienna. In January 2007, Ludwig was appointed City Councillor for Housing, Construction, and Urban Renewal under mayor Michael Häupl (SPÖ), succeeding Werner Faymann. Ludwig became the second Deputy Mayor of the 26 March 2009. He left office after the 2010 state election, and was succeeded by Maria Vassilakou of the Greens.

In 2010, Ludwig took over the chairmanship of the SPÖ Floridsdorf from Kurt Eder. On 28 May 2011, he was elected one of five deputy chairmen at the SPÖ Vienna state party conference. In the lead-up to the 2017 federal election, Ludwig spoke out against the prospect of a coalition between the SPÖ and Freedom Party of Austria (FPÖ), claiming the parties had too little in common.

In 2017, Häupl announced his pending retirement, and Ludwig was elected to succeed him as chairman of the SPÖ Vienna at the state party conference, winning 57 percent of the delegate votes against opponent Andreas Schieder.

== As Mayor ==
On 24 May 2018, Ludwig succeeded Häupl as Mayor of Vienna, and was sworn in as Governor by President Alexander van der Bellen on 29 May 2018. In the 2020 Viennese state elections, Ludwig led the SPÖ to 41.62 per cent of the vote, an increase of 2.03 percentage points compared with the 2015 election. Despite gains by the Greens, the SPÖ's previous coalition partner, Ludwig opted to form a coalition with the liberal party NEOS, which received 7.47 per cent of the vote. On 17 November 2020, the first red-pink coalition in Austria was presented. Under this arrangement, the SPÖ retained six executive councillors, while the education portfolio was assigned to NEOS.

In October 2023, Ludwig announced his withdrawal from the federal bodies of the SPÖ. Political opponents and sections of the media interpreted this step as a sign of opposition to the party's federal chairman, Andreas Babler, an interpretation which Ludwig rejected. At the 2025 Viennese elections, Ludwig again stood as the SPÖ's lead candidate, with the party receiving 39.38 per cent of the vote, a decrease of 2.24 percentage points compared with 2020. Despite this being the SPÖ's second-worst result in Vienna since 1945, the party remained the largest group in the parliament by a significant amount, and the coalition with the NEOS continued.

== Personal life ==
In August 2018, Ludwig married his longtime partner Irmtraud Rossgatterer.
