= 2020 Viennese state election =

State election in Vienna, Austria

- 11 October 2020

All 100 seats in the Gemeinderat and Landtag of Vienna 51 seats needed for a majority All 13 seats in the state government
- Turnout: 739,485 (65.3%) ▼9.4%
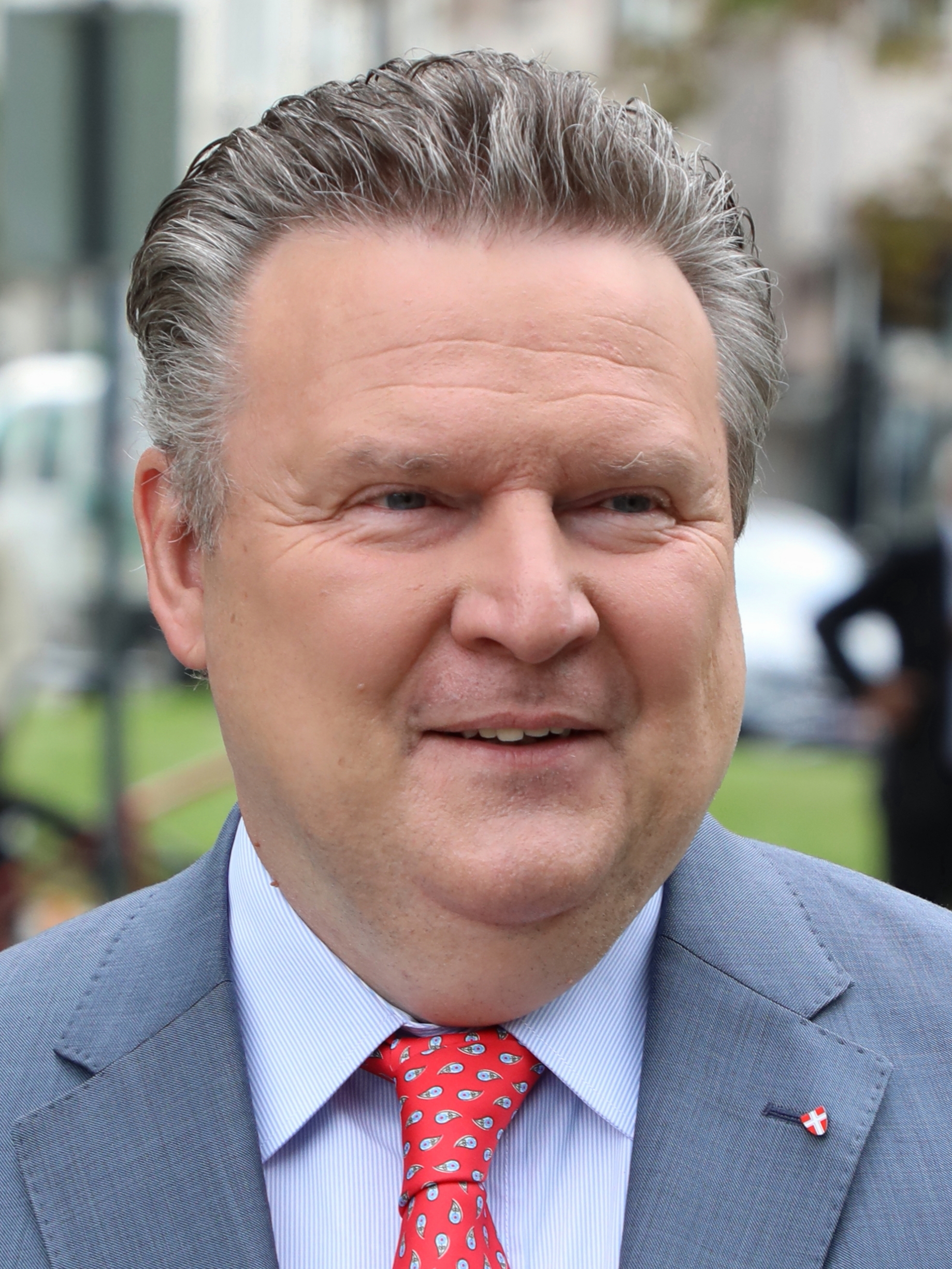

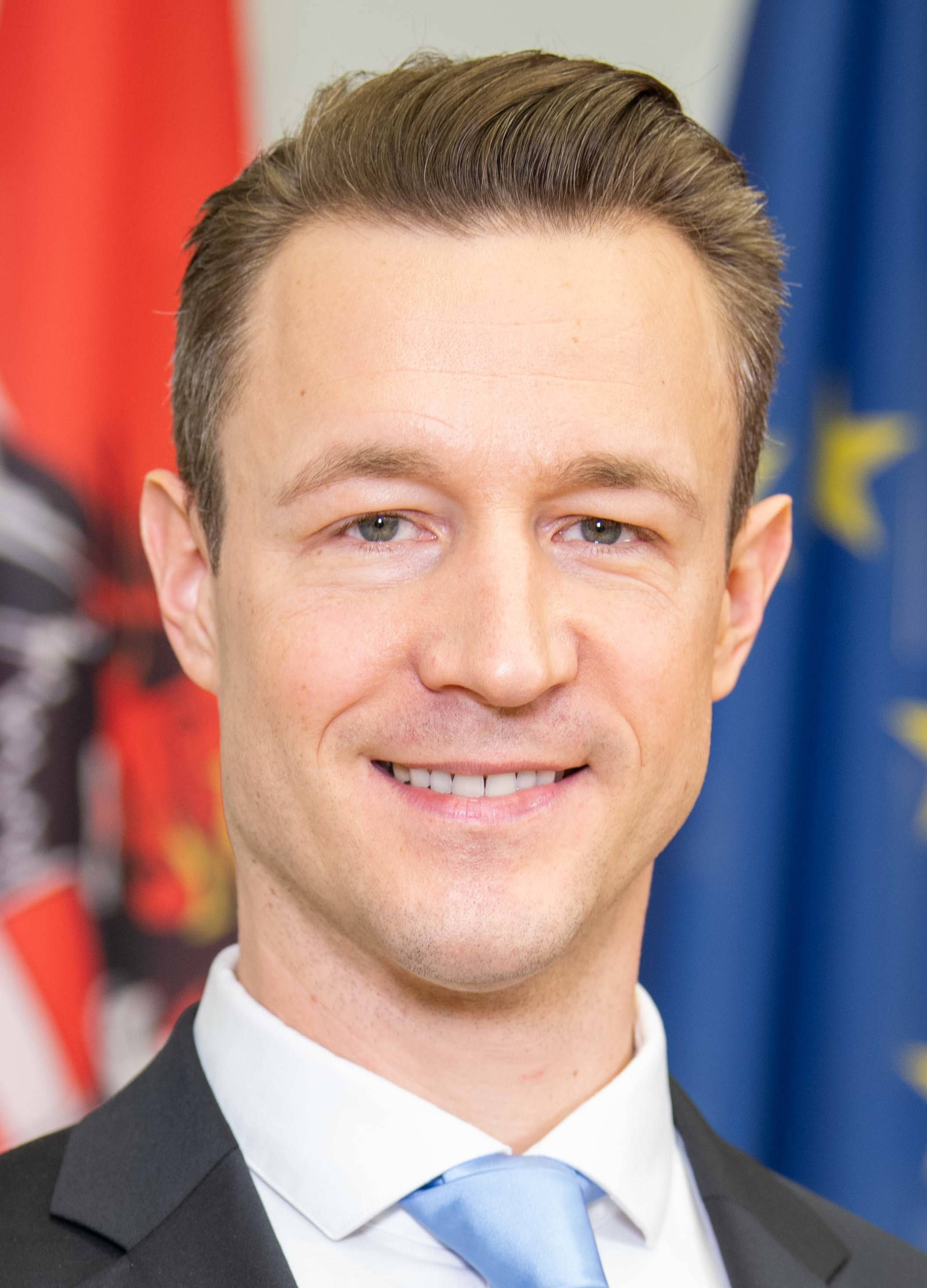

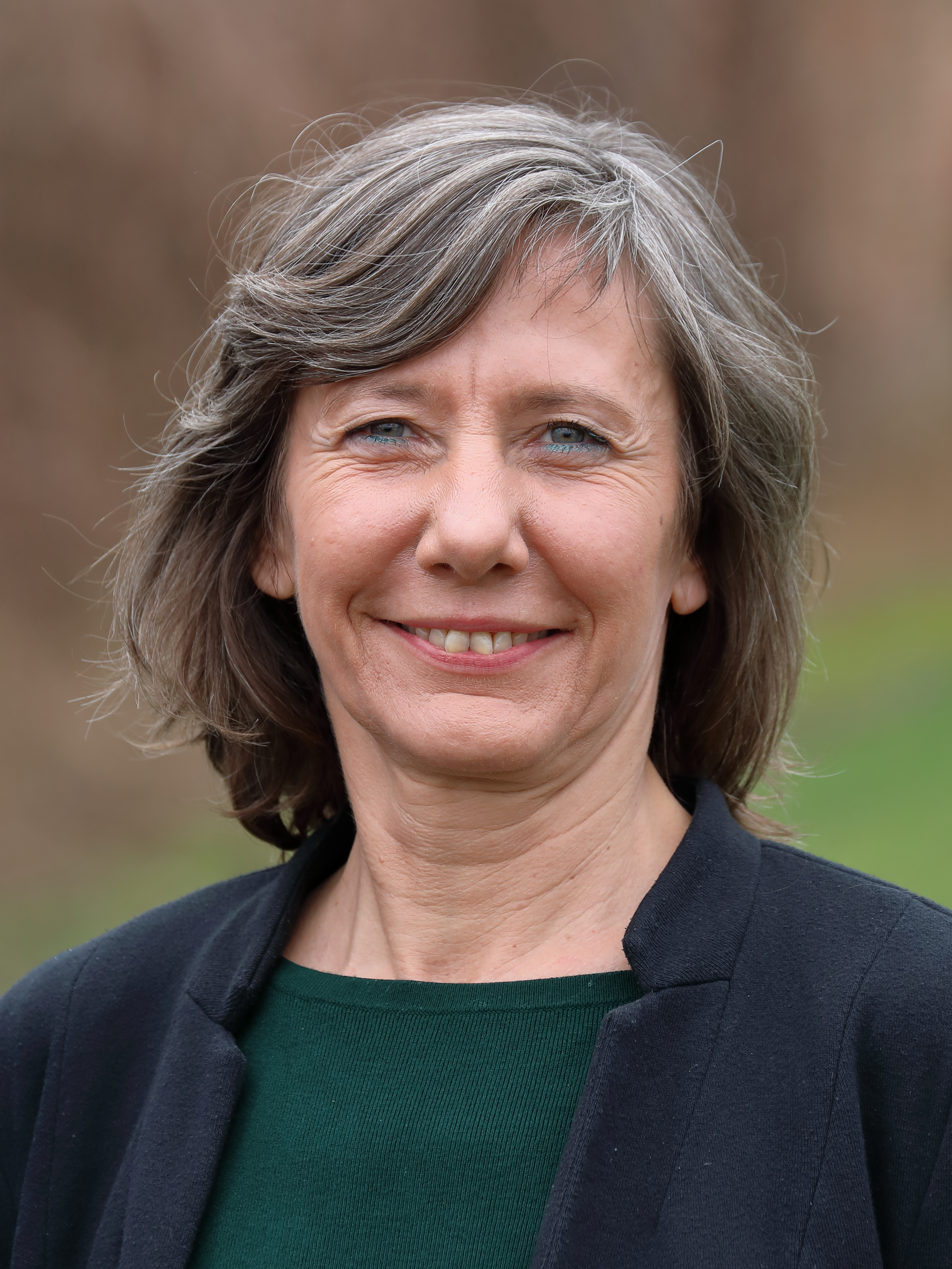

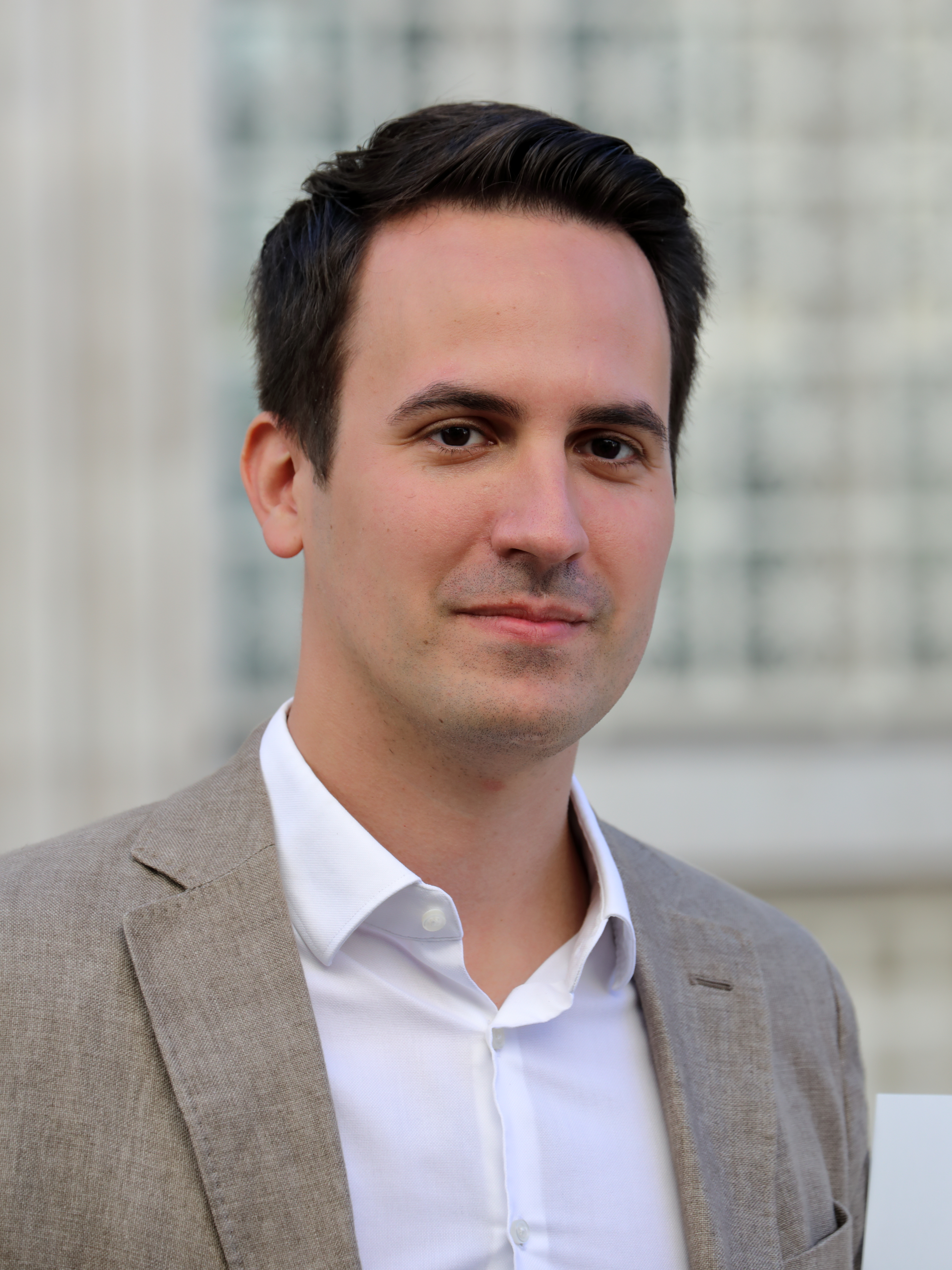

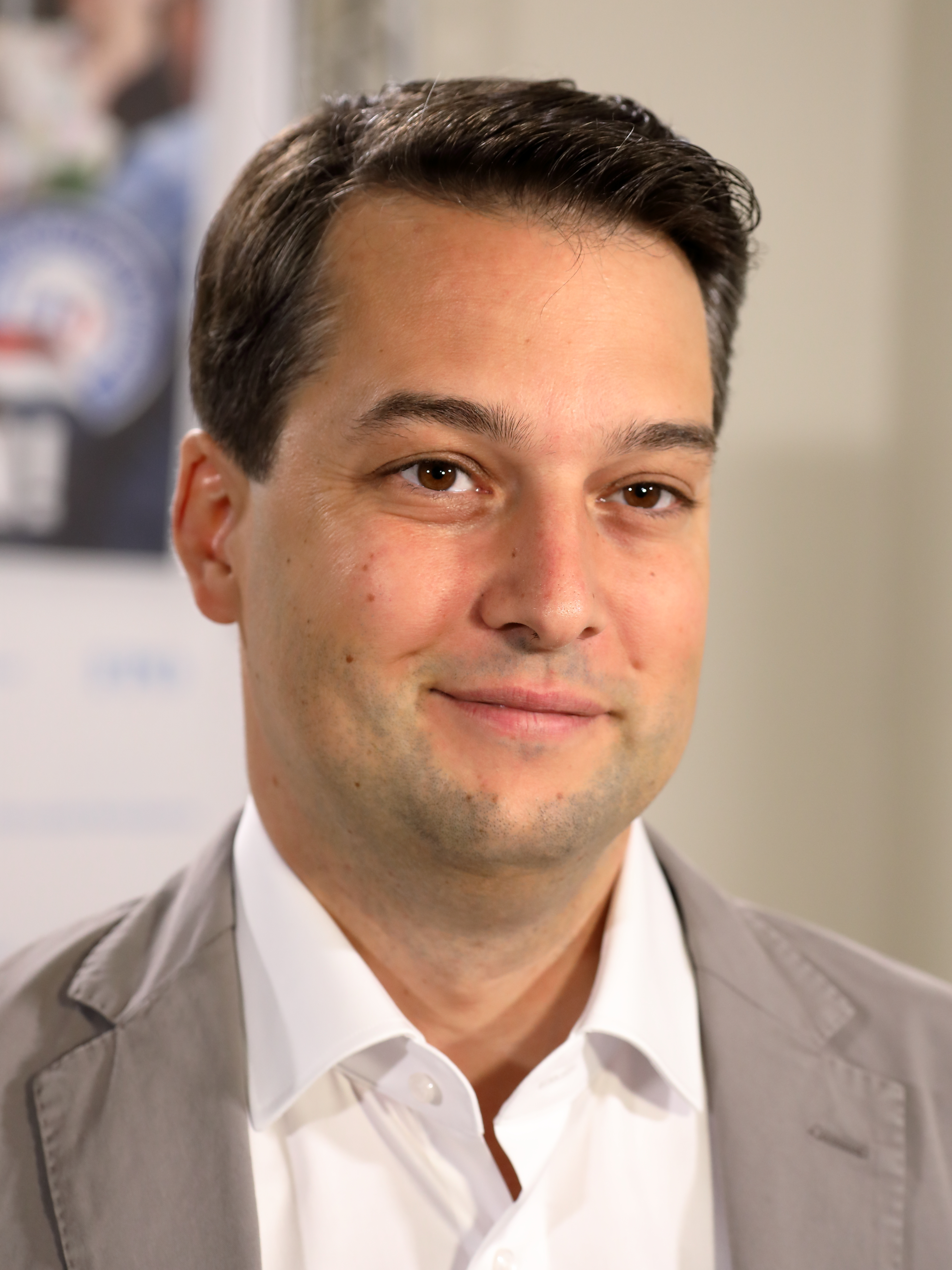
	First party	Second party	Third party
Candidate	Michael Ludwig	Gernot Blümel	Birgit Hebein
Party	SPÖ	ÖVP	Greens
Last election	44 seats, 39.6%	7 seats, 9.2%	10 seats, 11.8%
Seats won	46	22	16
Seat change	▲2	▲15	▲6
Popular vote	301,967	148,238	107,397
Percentage	41.6%	20.4%	14.8%
Swing	▲2.0%	▲11.2%	▲3.0%
	Fourth party	Fifth party
Candidate	Christoph Wiederkehr	Dominik Nepp
Party	NEOS	FPÖ
Last election	5 seats, 6.2%	34 seats, 30.8%
Seats won	8	8
Seat change	▲3	▼26
Popular vote	54,173	51,603
Percentage	7.5%	7.1%
Swing	▲1.3%	▼23.7%
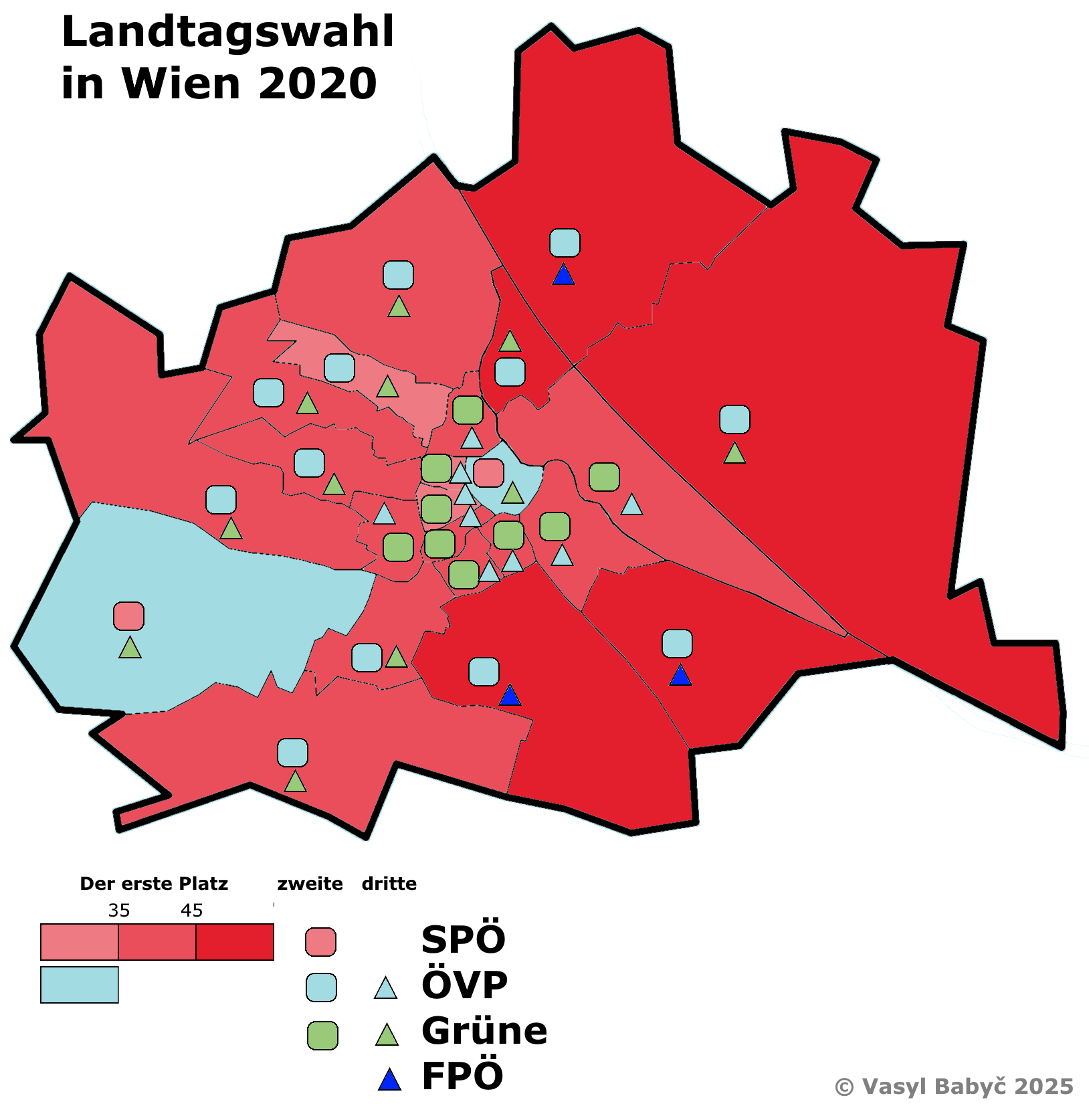
- Results by district.
Mayor and Governor before election
Michael Ludwig
SPÖ
Elected Mayor and Governor
Michael Ludwig
SPÖ

The 2020 Viennese state election was held on 11 October 2020 to elect the members of the Gemeinderat and Landtag of Vienna. The outgoing government was a coalition of the Social Democratic Party (SPÖ) and The Greens.

The SPÖ remained comfortably in first place with small gains. Conversely, the previously second-placed Freedom Party of Austria (FPÖ) suffered a catastrophic defeat, losing 80% of its votes compared to 2015 and becoming the smallest party in the legislature. The Austrian People's Party (ÖVP) moved into second place after more than doubling its vote share. The Greens recorded their best result to date, just under 15%. NEOS – The New Austria (NEOS) moved into fourth place with minor gains. Team HC Strache fell short of the 5% electoral threshold to enter the Gemeinderat and Landtag.

On 27 October, Mayor and Governor Michael Ludwig announced that the SPÖ would seek a coalition with NEOS. Negotiations were successful and the parties presented their coalition pact on 17 November. Ludwig was re-elected as Mayor by the Gemeinderat and Landtag on 24 November, and the new government was sworn in the same day.

== Background ==
The Viennese constitution mandates that cabinet positions in the city government (city councillors, German: Stadträte) be allocated between parties proportionally in accordance with the share of votes won by each; this is known as Proporz. The number of city councillors is voted upon by the Landtag after each election, and may legally vary between nine and fifteen. City councillors are divided into two groups – "senior" councillors, who hold a cabinet portfolio, and "non-executive" councillors who do not. Non-executive councillors may vote in cabinet meetings, but do not otherwise hold any government responsibility. In practice, parties seek to form a coalition which holds a majority in both the Landtag and city government. City councillors bound to the coalition become senior councillors, while the opposition are relegated to non-executive status.

In the 2015 state election, the SPÖ and ÖVP both suffered losses, with the former recording its worst result since 1996 and the latter its worst ever. This came to the benefit of the FPÖ, which achieved its best ever result, and NEOS, which entered the Landtag for the first time. The SPÖ won seven councillors, the FPÖ four, the Greens one, and the ÖVP one. The SPÖ renewed its coalition with the Greens.

In August 2017, Mayor and Governor Michael Häupl announced his impending retirement. He had served since 1994. He did not seek re-election as head of the Vienna SPÖ in January 2018, and was succeeded by long-serving city councillor Michael Ludwig. Häupl resigned as Mayor and Governor on 24 May 2018, and Ludwig was subsequently elected as his replacement by the Gemeinderat and Landtag. He was sworn in on 29 May.

The Ibiza affair in May 2019 led to the resignation of Vice-Chancellor Heinz-Christian Strache and a general decline in support for the FPÖ nationally, which was seen in the 2019 federal election and subsequent state elections in Vorarlberg, Styria, and Burgenland. Strache resigned from all political offices in November 2019, but in early 2020 announced he would join The Alliance for Austria to run in the Viennese state election. The party subsequently adopted the name Team HC Strache – Alliance for Austria.

== Electoral system ==
The 100 seats of the Gemeinderat and Landtag of Vienna are elected via open list proportional representation in a two-step process. The seats are distributed between eighteen multi-member constituencies. For parties to receive any representation in the Landtag, they must either win at least one seat in a constituency directly, or clear a 5 percent state-wide electoral threshold. Seats are distributed in constituencies according to the modified Hare quota, with any remaining seats allocated at the state level to create a greater degree of proportionality between a party's vote share and its share of seats.

After the 2015 election, a minor reform to the electoral system was passed, changing the formula for distribution of seats in constituencies. The new formula increases the number of votes required to win a seat in a constituency, resulting in fewer seats being distributed to parties through constituencies and more distributed on the state level. This reform was seen as beneficial to minor parties, which are unlikely to win more than a few seats in constituencies, and must rely on state-level distribution for most of their representation.

== Election statistics ==
A total of 1,133,010 people were eligible to vote in the state election, among them 597,027 women and 535,983 men. Only Austrian citizens aged 16 or older on election day were eligible. Thus, 30% of the Viennese population had no right to vote or stand as a candidate. For the district council elections held on the same day, a total of 1,362,789 voters were eligible; this number is higher than for the state election as EU citizens aged over 16 are eligible to vote in the district coulcil elections. Among this number were 712,131 women and 650,658 men.

A total of 1,494 polling stations were set up on election day. As many as 500,000 absentee/postal ballots were expected to be issued for the election. Requesting a postal ballot in person was permitted from 14 September, with the option to cast the vote early in-person right after requesting it at Vienna's various election offices. On 9 October, the City of Vienna announced that a final total of 382,214 absentee/postal ballots were issued for the election, of which 360,563 were issued to Austrian citizens for the Gemeinderat and Landtag election and an additional 21,651 to EU citizens who are eligible to vote only in the district elections. This set a new record for Vienna, topping the 266,150 voting cards issued in Vienna for the 2019 Austrian legislative election.

== Contesting parties ==
The table below lists parties represented in the previous Landtag.

Name		Ideology	Lead candidate	2015 result		
Name		Ideology	Lead candidate	Votes (%)	Seats	Councillors
SPÖ	Social Democratic Party of Austria; Sozialdemokratische Partei Österreichs	Social democracy	Michael Ludwig	39.6%	44 / 100	7 / 13
FPÖ	Freedom Party of Austria; Freiheitliche Partei Österreichs	Right-wing populism Euroscepticism	Dominik Nepp	30.8%	34 / 100	4 / 13
GRÜNE	The Greens – The Green Alternative; Die Grünen – Die Grüne Alternative	Green politics	Birgit Hebein	11.8%	10 / 100	1 / 13
ÖVP	Austrian People's Party; Österreichische Volkspartei	Christian democracy	Gernot Blümel	9.2%	7 / 100	1 / 13
NEOS	NEOS – The New Austria and Liberal Forum; NEOS – Das Neue Österreich und Liberales Forum	Liberalism; Pro-Europeanism	Christoph Wiederkehr	6.2%	5 / 100	0 / 13

In addition to the parties already represented in the Landtag, seven parties collected enough signatures to be placed on the ballot.

- Team HC Strache – Alliance for Austria (HC)
- LEFT (LINKS)
- Social Austria of the Future (SÖZ)
- Beer Party of Austria (BIER)
- Volt Austria (Volt) – on the ballot only in Centre and Inner West
- We for Floridsdorf (WIFF) – on the ballot only in Floridsdorf
- Pro23 – List Ernst Paleta (PRO) – on the ballot only in Liesing

=== Lead candidates ===
Party	Candidate	Offices held
SPÖ	Michael Ludwig	Mayor and Governor of Vienna (since 2018); Chairman of SPÖ Vienna (since 2018); City Councillor for Housing, Construction, and Urban Renewal (2007–2018)
FPÖ	Dominik Nepp	Chairman of FPÖ Vienna (since 2019); Non-executive City Councillor (since 2017)
GRÜNE	Birgit Hebein	Deputy Mayor of Vienna (since 2019); Chairwoman of The Greens Vienna (since 2019); City Councillor for Urban Development, Transport, Climate, and Energy (since 2019)
ÖVP	Gernot Blümel	Chairman of ÖVP Vienna (since 2015); Federal Minister of Finance (since 2020); Non-executive City Councillor (2015–2018)
NEOS	Christoph Wiederkehr	Spokesman of NEOS Vienna (since 2018); NEOS group leader in the Gemeinderat and Landtag of Vienna (since 2018); Member of the Gemeinderat and Landtag of Vienna (since 2015)
HC	Heinz-Christian Strache	Chairman of Team HC Strache – Alliance for Austria (since 2020); Vice-Chancellor of Austria (2017–2019); Chairman of the FPÖ (2005–2019)
LINKS	Anna Svec	Counsellor at law
SÖZ	Martha Bißmann	Member of the National Council (2017–2019); Presidential campaign manager for Irmgard Griss (2016)
BIER	Marco Pogo	Chairman of the Austrian Beer Party (since 2015); Frontman of Turbobier

== Opinion polling ==
=== Graphical summary ===
Local regression of polls conducted.

=== Party polling ===
Polling firm	Fieldwork date	Sample size	SPÖ	FPÖ	Grüne	ÖVP	NEOS	HC	Others	Lead
2020 state election	11 Oct 2020	–	41.6	7.1	14.8	20.4	7.5	3.3	5.3	21.2
Research Affairs	3–5 Oct 2020	800	42	11	13	19	7	5	3	23
OGM	29 Sep–1 Oct 2020	803	42	10	17	19	6	4	2	23
Research Affairs	28–30 Sep 2020	404	42	10	13	20	7	6	2 (Note: BIER 1%, Other 1%.)	22
Market	25–29 Sep 2020	787	42	9	16	21	6	4	2	21
Unique Research	16–25 Sep 2020	1,610	42	9	15	19	7	4	4	23
Research Affairs	21–24 Sep 2020	400	40	10	13	21	8	6	2 (Note: BIER 1%, Other 1%.)	19
Demox Research (ÖVP)	6–18 Sep 2020	800	43.5	11.5	14	15.5	7	5.5	3	28
Research Affairs	14–16 Sep 2020	400	40	11	13	20	7	6	3 (Note: BIER 1%, Other 2%.)	20
Research Affairs	8–10 Sep 2020	400	41	11	14	20	7	5	2	21
OGM	7–9 Sep 2020	804	41	10	16	21	6	4	2	20
Unique Research	28 Aug–4 Sep 2020	1,603	41	9	15	20	7	5	3	21
Research Affairs	31 Aug–2 Sep 2020	400	40	12	13	21	7	5	2	19
Research Affairs	25–27 Aug 2020	400	39	11	14	23	7	4	2	16
OGM	18–20 Aug 2020	805	39	11	16	21	7	4	2	18
Research Affairs	17–20 Aug 2020	401	39	11	14	22	8	3	3	17
Research Affairs	3–6 Aug 2020	400	39	10	14	22	8	4	3	17
OGM	13–16 Jul 2020	801	38	10	17	23	7	4	1	15
Research Affairs	6–9 Jul 2020	412	38	9	15	23	8	5	2	15
OGM	5 Jul 2020	?	38	10	17	24	6	4	1	14
Market	15–18 Jun 2020	804	38	9	16	25	7	4	1	13
Hajek	5–10 Jun 2020	800	38	8	17	23	6	6	2	15
Research Affairs	5–10 Jun 2020	500	36	8	15	24	8	6	3	12
Unique Research	5 Jun 2020	809	38	8	15	25	7	5	2	13
Research Affairs	25–27 May 2020	400	33	9	16	25	8	6	3	8
Research Affairs	20–23 Apr 2020	400	37	9	17	23	7	5	2	14
OGM	19 Apr 2020	791	37	8	17	24	7	5	2	13
Unique Research	6 Mar 2020	?	36	10	19	22	6	5	2	14
Research Affairs	24–28 Feb 2020	400	34	11	17	20	9	7	2	14
OGM	February 2020	?	36	10	18	21	8	5	–	15
Karmasin Research	29 Jan 2020	1,000	35	13	16	19	8	7	2	16
Research Affairs	3–9 Jan 2020	400	32	12	17	21	10	5	3	11
OGM	20 Dec 2019	902	33	17	17	20	10	–	3	13
OGM	20 Dec 2019	902	33	14	17	20	10	4 (Note: Theoretical polling.)	2	13
Unique Research	2 Nov 2019	?	36	16	18	20	8	–	2	16
Research Affairs	11–17 Jul 2019	403	34	24	12	16	8	–	6 (Note: JETZT 3%.)	10
Unique Research	30 May 2019	800	37	21	14	17	8	–	3	16
DEMOX	January–March 2019	492	39	24	9	16	8	–	4 (Note: JETZT 2%.)	15
Research Affairs	17–23 Jan 2019	409	36	26	8	16	10	–	4 (Note: JETZT 2%.)	10
Unique Research	16 Nov 2018	?	37	25	10	17	8	–	3	12
Research Affairs	30 Aug–5 Sep 2018	415	35	28	6	18	8	–	5 (Note: JETZT 2%.)	7
Research Affairs	24–30 May 2018	417	34	29	7	19	7	–	4 (Note: JETZT 2%.)	5
OGM	27 May 2018	?	34	27	6	22	6	–	5 (Note: JETZT 4%.)	7
Research Affairs	17–19 Jan 2018	410	32	30	8	18	8	–	4 (Note: JETZT 3%.)	2
Unique Research	16 Jan 2018	?	34	20	8	22	9	–	8 (Note: JETZT 6%.)	14
IFES	12–19 Dec 2017	800	39	22	6	19	8	–	6	17
OGM	27–30 Nov 2017	500	32	29	6	20	8	–	5	3
Research Affairs	28 Apr 2017	?	24	40	15	10	8	–	–	16
Unique Research	20 Jan 2017	?	31	37	11	10	8	–	–	6
Research Affairs	15 Jan 2017	?	25	38	17	9	8	–	–	13
Hajek	16 Oct 2016	?	27	40	15	7	8	–	3	13
2015 state election	11 Oct 2015	–	39.6	30.8	11.8	9.2	6.2	–	2.4	8.8

=== Better Mayor polling ===
Better Mayor polling
Polling firm	Fieldwork date	Sample size													None/ Unsure	Lead
Polling firm	Fieldwork date	Sample size	Häupl SPÖ	Ludwig SPÖ	Strache FPÖ	Gudenus FPÖ	Nepp FPÖ	Vassilakou Grüne	Hebein Grüne	Blümel ÖVP	Meinl- Reisinger NEOS	Wiederkehr NEOS	Strache HC	Pilz JETZT	None/ Unsure	Lead
Research Affairs	28–30 Sep 2020	404		50			7		10	19		5	6		3	31
Research Affairs	17 Sep 2020	?		47			8		9	19		6	6		5	28
OGM	7–9 Sep 2020	804		54			9		12	15		4	6		–	39
Research Affairs	8–10 Sep 2020	400		48			8		10	19		6	5		4	29
Research Affairs	31 Aug–2 Sep 2020	400		47			8		9	21		6	5		4	26
Research Affairs	25–27 Aug 2020	400		47			8		8	22		6	5		4	25
Research Affairs	17–20 Aug 2020	401		47			8		8	21		7	4		5	26
Research Affairs	3–6 Aug 2020	400		46			7		9	20		7	6		5	26
OGM	13–16 Jul 2020	801		48			9		11	22		4	5		–	26
Research Affairs	6–9 Jul 2020	412		44			6		10	21		6	6		7	23
OGM	5 Jul 2020	?		50			8		11	22		3	5		–	28
Market	15–18 Jun 2020	804		42			5		11	16		1	2		23	26
Hajek	5–10 Jun 2020	800		54			6		11	19		1	8		–	35
Research Affairs	5–10 Jun 2020	500		43			6		11	23		5	8		4	20
Unique Research	5 Jun 2020	809		38			4		7	14		2	5		30	24
Research Affairs	25–27 May 2020	400		41			7		11	24		5	8		4	17
Research Affairs	20–23 Apr 2020	400		43			6		12	23		5	7		4	20
Research Affairs	24–28 Feb 2020	400		42			8		12	21		5	8		4	21
Karmasin Research	29 Jan 2020	1,000		40.2			8.1		11.0	18.4		2.2	10.3		9.8	21.8
Research Affairs	3–9 Jan 2020	400		40			8		13	22		–	6		11	18
Research Affairs	29 Nov–5 Dec 2019	400		40			9		17	21		–	5		8	19
Research Affairs	11–17 Jul 2019	403		42	13		–		12	22		–	–		21	20
Research Affairs	17–23 Jan 2019	409		39	22		–		7	14	15	–	–	3	–	17
Research Affairs	24–30 May 2018	417		39	24		–	5	–	16	11	–	–	5	–	15
OGM	27 May 2018	?		33	–	12	–	2	–	11	5	–	–	7	30	21
OGM	27–30 Nov 2017	500	29	–	22	–	–	1	–	10	3	–	–	–	35	7

== Results ==
2020 Viennese state election
Party	Votes	%	+/–	Seats	+/–
Social Democratic Party of Austria (SPÖ)	301,967	41.62	+2.03	46	+2
Austrian People's Party (ÖVP)	148,238	20.43	+11.19	22	+15
The Greens – The Green Alternative (GRÜNE)	107,397	14.80	+2.96	16	+6
NEOS – The New Austria (NEOS)	54,173	7.47	+1.31	8	+3
Freedom Party of Austria (FPÖ)	51,603	7.11	–23.68	8	–26
Team HC Strache – Alliance for Austria (HC)	23,688	3.27	New	0	New
LEFT (LINKS)	14,919	2.06	+0.99	0	±0
Beer Party of Austria (BIER)	13,095	1.80	New	0	New
Social Austria of the Future (SÖZ)	8,742	1.20	New	0	New
We for Floridsdorf (WIFF)	1,201	0.17	+0.01	0	±0
Pro23 – List Ernst Paleta (PRO)	376	0.05	New	0	New
Volt Austria (Volt)	102	0.01	New	0	New
Total	725,501	100.00	–	100	0
Valid votes	725,501	98.11	+0.62		
Invalid/blank votes	13,984	1.89	–0.62		
Total votes	739,485	100.00	–		
Registered voters/turnout	1,133,010	65.27	–9.48		
Source: Viennese Government

Popular vote
SPÖ	41.62%
ÖVP	20.43%
GRÜNE	14.80%
NEOS	7.47%
FPÖ	7.11%
HC	3.27%
Other	5.30%

Gemeinderat and Landtag seats
SPÖ	46.00%
ÖVP	22.00%
GRÜNE	16.00%
NEOS	8.00%
FPÖ	8.00%

=== Results by constituency ===
Results by District

Constituency	SPÖ		ÖVP		Grüne		NEOS		FPÖ		HC		Others	Total seats	Turnout
Constituency	%	S	%	S	%	S	%	S	%	S	%	S	%	Total seats	Turnout
Centre	36.9	2	19.5	1	22.4	1	9.4		4.3		2.0		5.4	4	69.1
Inner West	34.4	1	18.3	1	26.0	1	10.7		3.6		1.4		5.6	3	74.3
Leopoldstadt	42.5	2	14.6		21.6	1	7.6		5.1		2.8		5.8	3	66.8
Landstraße	39.6	2	19.1	1	19.2	1	9.4		5.0		2.5		5.2	4	68.1
Favoriten	48.4	5	18.7	1	8.2		4.5		9.5		4.6		6.2	6	59.3
Simmering	46.6	3	17.2	1	6.7		4.3		14.9		4.6		5.7	4	60.3
Meidling	44.8	2	18.7	1	13.7		6.4		7.0		3.6		5.7	3	60.7
Hietzing	31.4	1	32.4	1	14.3		11.6		5.0		2.3		3.1	2	72.5
Penzing	39.2	2	23.1	1	15.6		8.2		6.5		2.8		4.5	3	67.4
Rudolfsheim-Fünfhaus	42.3	1	14.1		21.2		5.9		5.7		2.9		8.0	1	61.4
Ottakring	41.7	2	17.9		17.9		6.5		6.0		3.1		6.8	2	64.9
Hernals	36.4	1	21.0		20.0		9.0		5.4		2.4		5.9	1	68.3
Währing	30.6	1	24.8		23.0		11.7		3.6		1.8		4.5	1	74.0
Döbling	35.1	1	29.6	1	13.3		10.7		5.5		2.5		3.4	2	69.4
Brigittenau	48.2	2	15.7		14.4		5.1		7.0		3.3		6.4	2	60.1
Floridsdorf	46.2	4	20.4	2	8.0		5.2		9.7	1	4.9		5.6	7	61.2
Donaustadt	46.2	5	21.1	2	9.1	1	6.3		9.0	1	4.2		4.2	9	64.2
Liesing	41.7	2	24.2	1	10.4		7.8		8.0		3.4		4.5	3	66.9
Remaining seats		7		8		11		8		6		–		40	
Total	41.6	46	20.4	22	14.8	16	7.5	8	7.1	8	3.3	0	5.3	100	65.3
Source: Viennese Government

=== Analysis ===
The FPÖ only won one-fifth as many votes as it had in 2015; analysis by SORA indicated that 100,000 people who gave their vote to the FPÖ in 2015 did not vote in 2020. The party lost 43,000 votes to the ÖVP, 32,000 to the SPÖ, and 17,000 to Team HC. Overall, the FPÖ gained less than 1,000 votes from other parties compared to 2015.

Polling indicated that federal politics was a major factor among the majority of voters of almost all parties, including 74% of ÖVP voters, and 56–57% of Green, NEOS, and FPÖ voters. By contrast, only 36% of SPÖ voters stated that federal politics was a major factor in their choice.

Analysis by SORA indicated strong voting trends in different age groups, with the SPÖ and ÖVP strongest among older voters, and the Greens and NEOS stronger among younger voters. In contrast to the overall trend, the ÖVP improved its performance only negligibly among voters under 29, winning just 7%. The FPÖ crashed from 25% to 5%, with the difference made up by gains for the Greens (27%) and minor parties (12%). The Greens also placed second among 30-44 year olds at 19% to the ÖVP's 17%, while NEOS and the FPÖ recorded their best results among this demographic at 11% and 9%, respectively.

According to analysis published by the OGM Institute, 20% of voters of Turkish immigrant background voted for Social Austria of the Future (SÖZ), making it the second-most popular party among this demographic. SÖZ, a minor party representing immigrant interests, won just 1.2% of the vote overall. The SPÖ also performed better among Turkish immigrants than the overall electorate, with all other parties performing worse, particularly the ÖVP (10%) and Greens (9%). Voters of Serbian immigrant background voted moderately more strongly for the SPÖ, FPÖ, and Team HC than the general electorate.

== Aftermath ==
Greens leader Birgit Hebein stated the result was a "very clear mandate" for a renewal of the incumbent SPÖ–Green government. NEOS lead candidate Christoph Wiederkehr expressed his party's desire to join the state government, naming increased funding for education, economic relief, transparency, and a focus on the city's peripheral regions as conditions for a coalition.

FPÖ lead candidate Dominik Nepp described the loss as "painful", but attributed it to residue from the Ibiza affair. He stated he would have to analyse the full result before considering whether he would resign as regional party leader. Nepp and federal leader Norbert Hofer later confirmed they would each retain their positions despite the disastrous defeat. Heinz-Christian Strache blamed the FPÖ for his new party's failure to enter the Gemeinderat and Landtag, accusing them of "heartlessly causing the split".

Political scientist Thomas Hofer stated that an SPÖ–ÖVP government was unlikely due to potential conflict with the federal government, which makes it unfavourable for the ÖVP. He also believed the SPÖ were unlikely to cede the finance ministry to Gernot Blümel, which would be a major stumbling block. Fellow political scientist Kathrin Stainer-Hämmerle described a potential SPÖ–NEOS government as a "counter-model" to the federal ÖVP–Green government, offering the public an alternative. Concurring with commentary from the Kurier, she also believed that the result weakened the position of federal SPÖ leader Pamela Rendi-Wagner while confirming the strength of the party's popular state governors Ludwig, Hans Peter Doskozil, and Peter Kaiser. She questioned the FPÖ's choice to downplay the consequences of the result, speculating that the party may be privately considering a change in leadership on both the state and federal level.

=== Government formation ===
Mayor Michael Ludwig declined to commit to negotiations with any particular party, stating he was open to negotiations with all except the FPÖ. Mathematically, the SPÖ could form a majority with any one of the other parties. Ludwig stated that social cohesion and good cooperation are the "basic premise" for any coalition, and that he wanted talks to begin quickly.

Alexander Nikolai and Ernst Nevrivy, chairmen of the local SPÖ in Leopoldstadt and Donaustadt, voiced their support for a SPÖ–NEOS government. They criticised the conduct of the Greens during the previous term, claiming they had diverged from the coalition agreement, and expressed their belief that the SPÖ could cooperate well with NEOS. By contrast, former mayor Michael Häupl spoke out in favour of a renewed coalition with the Greens, stating that NEOS diverged too much from the SPÖ on economic policy to work together effectively. He also stated that the ÖVP, since their "turquoise" turn, had moved too far from the SPÖ to be viable partners in government.

Exploratory talks with NEOS, the Greens, and the ÖVP were held from 19 to 21 October. Ludwig stated his desire to have a coalition agreement in place by mid-November. He elaborated on his party's policy positions going into negotiations, rejecting the possibility of privatizing healthcare or withdrawing housing subsidies. NEOS leader Wiederkehr and Greens leader Hebein both described their respective talks as productive, and were optimistic about prospects of entering government with the SPÖ. ÖVP leader Blümel stated discussions were "constructive" but that there were "differences" between the two parties, especially in policy areas such as minimum wage, pensions, and the ÖVP's demand that knowledge of the German language be required for access to public housing. After this, commentators speculated that chances of an SPÖ–ÖVP coalition were very low, while the Greens and NEOS were both considered equally viable options.

On 27 October, Ludwig announced that the SPÖ would seek coalition negotiations with NEOS. He stated that priority areas would be responding to the COVID-19 pandemic, expanding the healthcare sector, strengthening business, improving education, and combating climate change. Explaining his decision, he said that while the Greens and SPÖ's policy was similar, they placed emphasis on different areas. He expressed that while he was satisfied with the accomplishments of the SPÖ–Green government, "the time seems ripe to try something new." He stated that the vote in the SPÖ presidium was unanimous, while only two members of the party executive voted against. NEOS leader Wiederkehr welcomed the announcement, stating his focus on improving education, job creation, and addressing the pandemic. He expressed his hope for a "reform coalition" between the two parties.

Greens leader Hebein voiced her disappointment and her concerns that a government with NEOS could take conservative positions on the health system and climate change. The Viennese ÖVP stated that the decision was predictable, as a coalition with NEOS was "the most convenient route with the weakest partner". They claimed that the SPÖ had been inflexible and unwilling to compromise during exploratory talks. FPÖ leader Nepp accused the other parties of playing a game of "who can offer less", and claimed his party would be the only serious opposition force in the next legislative period. The Viennese branch of the Socialist Youth spoke out against going into government with NEOS, with chairwoman Fiona Herzog describing the decision as "madness". She criticised NEOS's record on trade unions and endorsed coalition with the Greens, stating they have "always proved to be a good coalition partner." She stated that she was one of the two members of the party executive to vote against the coalition, with the other vote against coming from a representative of SPÖ's student branch.

The bulk of negotiations concluded by 12 November, with the parties agreeing on various policy areas. The coalition agreement was finalised and presented on 17 November.

Ludwig was re-elected as Mayor by the Gemeinderat and Landtag on 24 November, receiving 60 votes. This figure accounted for the 54 seats of the new governing coalition plus six votes from the opposition. Ludwig and his new government was sworn in shortly thereafter. NEOS leader Wiederkehr, the sole city councillor for his party, became Vice Mayor and councillor for education.

=== City councillors ===
The composition of the city councillors after the election are as follows:

Party	Councillors	Status
SPÖ	6 / 13	Government
ÖVP	3 / 13	Non-executive
GRÜNE	2 / 13	Non-executive
NEOS	1 / 13	Government
FPÖ	1 / 13	Non-executive
