= 2005 Viennese state election =

- 23 October 2005

All 100 seats in the Gemeinderat and Landtag of Vienna 51 seats needed for a majority All 14 seats in the state government
- Turnout: 694,515 (60.8%) ▼5.8%
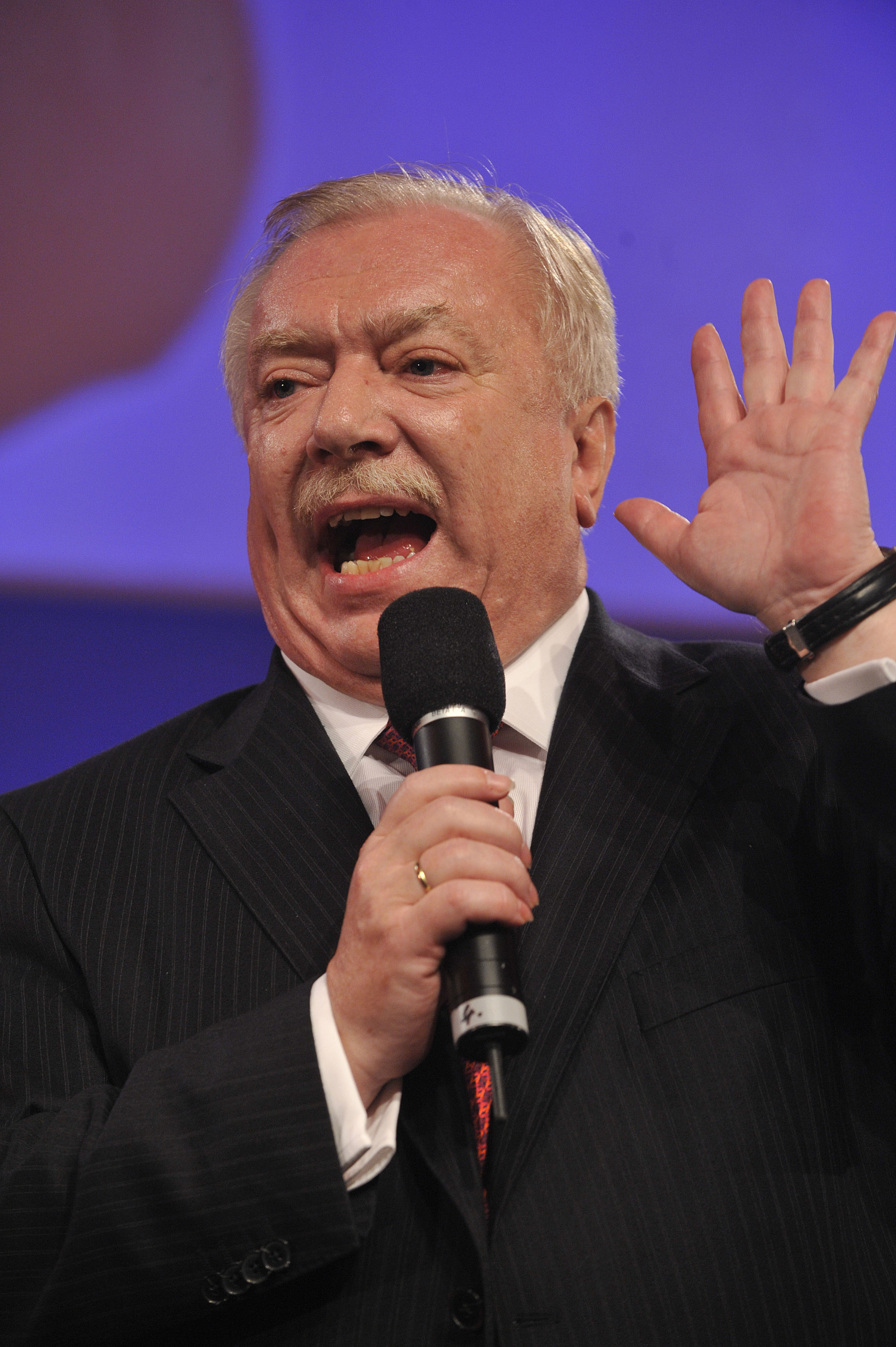

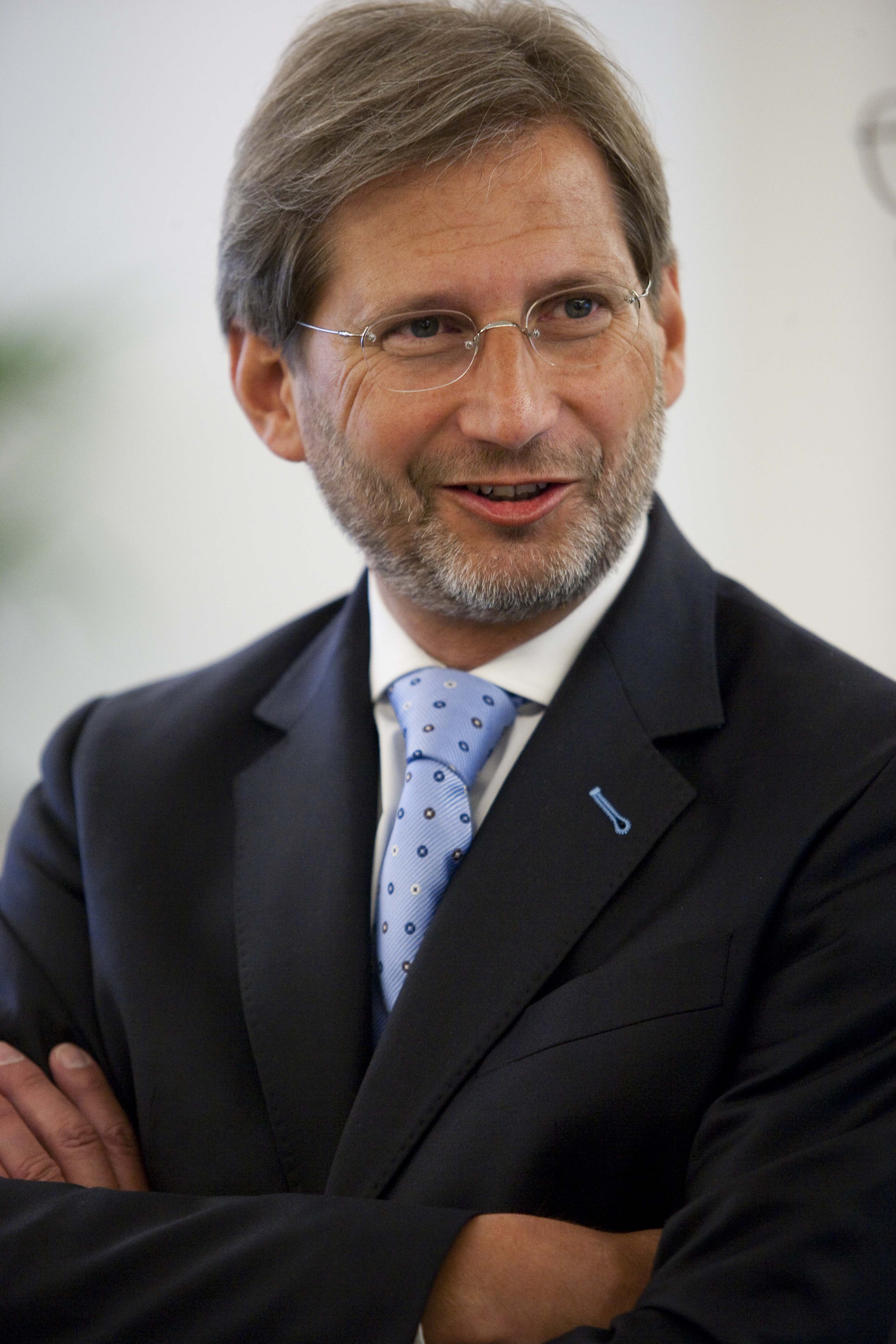

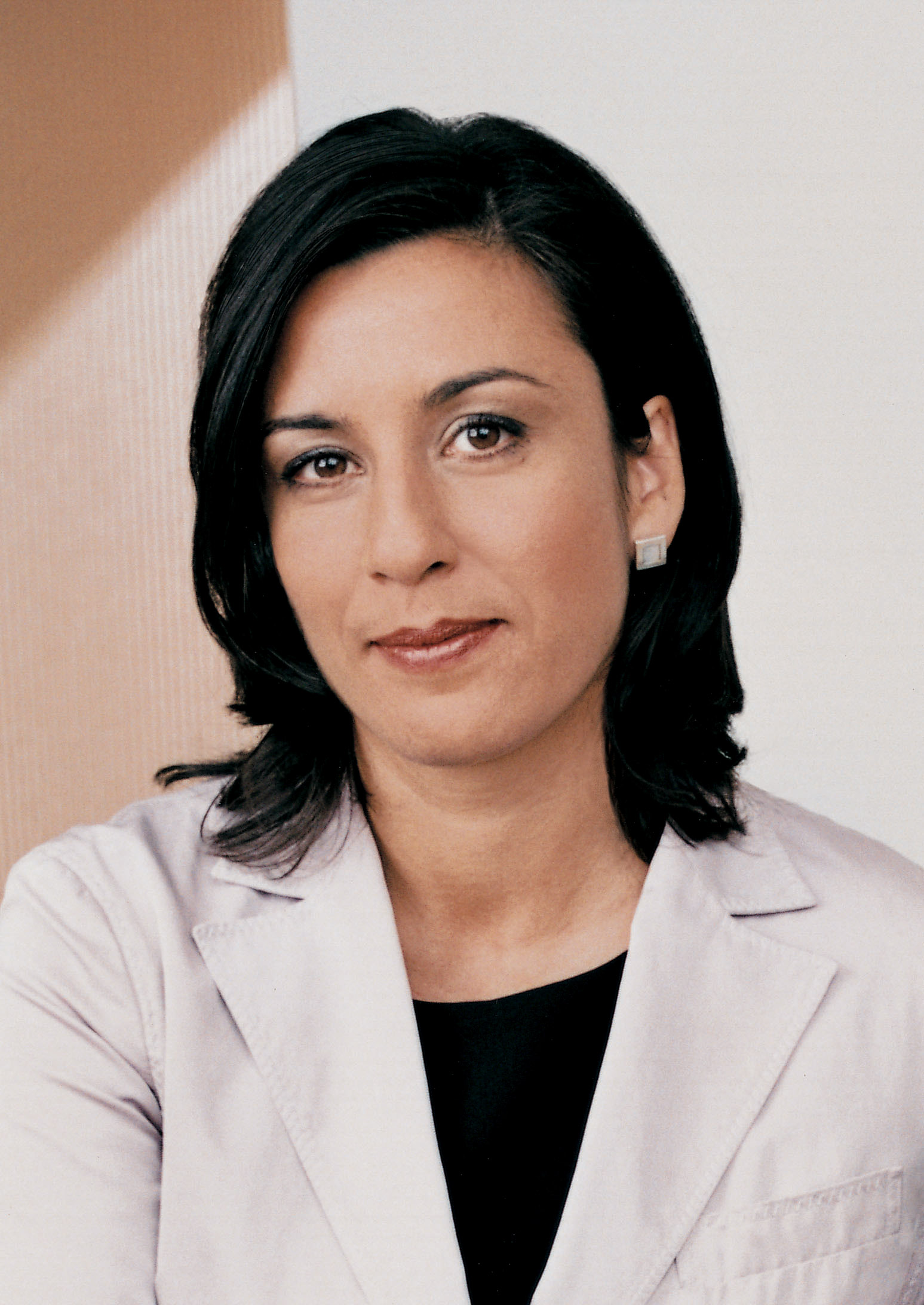

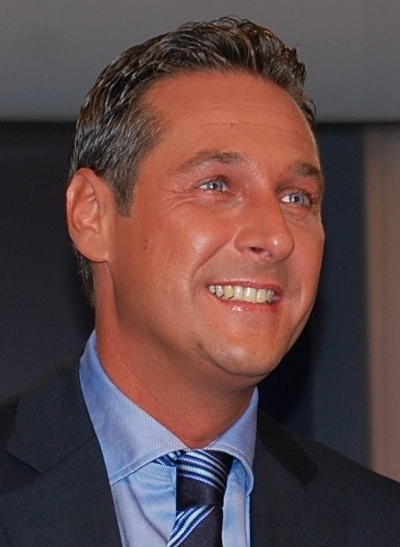
	First party	Second party
Leader	Michael Häupl	Johannes Hahn
Party	SPÖ	ÖVP
Last election	52 seats, 46.9%	16 seats, 16.4%
Seats won	55	18
Seat change	▲3	▲2
Popular vote	333,611	127,531
Percentage	49.1%	18.8%
Swing	▲2.2%	▲2.4%
	Third party	Fourth party
Leader	Maria Vassilakou	Heinz-Christian Strache
Party	Greens	FPÖ
Last election	11 seats, 12.4%	21 seats, 20.2%
Seats won	14	13
Seat change	▲3	▼8
Popular vote	99,432	100,780
Percentage	14.6%	14.8%
Swing	▲2.2%	▼5.3%
Mayor and Governor before election
Michael Häupl
SPÖ
Elected Mayor and Governor
Michael Häupl
SPÖ

The 2005 Viennese state election was held on 23 October 2005 to elect the members of the Gemeinderat and Landtag of Vienna.

The governing Social Democratic Party of Austria (SPÖ) led by Mayor and Governor Michael Häupl won a landslide victory, increasing its absolute majority by an additional three seats and winning just under half of the vote. The Freedom Party of Austria (FPÖ) suffered substantial losses, falling from second to fourth place. The Austrian People's Party (ÖVP) returned to second place for the first time since 1991. The Greens achieved their best-ever result, winning 14.6% of votes and becoming the third largest party in the Gemeinderat and Landtag. To date this is the last election any party won a majority in the Landtag.

== Background ==
The Viennese constitution mandates that cabinet positions in the city government (city councillors, German: Stadtsräten) be allocated between parties proportionally in accordance with the share of votes won by each; this is known as Proporz. The number of city councillors is voted upon by the Landtag after each election, and may legally vary between nine and fifteen. City councillors are divided into two groups – "senior" councillors, who hold a cabinet portfolio, and "non-executive" councillors who do not. Non-executive councillors may vote in cabinet meetings, but do not otherwise hold any government responsibility. In practice, parties seek to form a coalition which holds a majority in both the Landtag and city government. City councillors bound to the coalition become senior councillors, while the opposition are relegated to non-executive status.

In the 2001 state election, the SPÖ regained the absolute majority it had lost in 1996. The FPÖ suffered substantial losses, but remained the second largest party with 20% of the vote. The Greens also made gains, with the Liberal Forum lost its seats. The SPÖ won nine city councillors and formed government alone.

== Electoral system ==
The 100 seats of the Gemeinderat and Landtag of Vienna are elected via open list proportional representation in a two-step process. The seats are distributed between eighteen multi-member constituencies. For parties to receive any representation in the Landtag, they must either win at least one seat in a constituency directly, or clear a 5 percent state-wide electoral threshold. Seats are distributed in constituencies according to the Hare quota, with any remaining seats allocated using the D'Hondt method at the state level, to ensure overall proportionality between a party's vote share and its share of seats.

== Contesting parties ==
The table below lists parties represented in the previous Landtag.

Name		Ideology	Leader	2001 result		
Name		Ideology	Leader	Votes (%)	Seats	Councillors
SPÖ	Social Democratic Party of Austria; Sozialdemokratische Partei Österreichs	Social democracy	Michael Häupl	46.9%	52 / 100	9 / 15
FPÖ	Freedom Party of Austria; Freiheitliche Partei Österreichs	Right-wing populism Euroscepticism	Heinz-Christian Strache	20.2%	21 / 100	3 / 15
ÖVP	Austrian People's Party; Österreichische Volkspartei	Christian democracy	Johannes Hahn	16.4%	16 / 100	2 / 15
GRÜNE	The Greens – The Green Alternative; Die Grünen – Die Grüne Alternative	Green politics	Maria Vassilakou	12.4%	11 / 100	1 / 15

In addition to the parties already represented in the Landtag, four parties collected enough signatures to be placed on the ballot.

- Communist Party of Austria (KPÖ)
- Alliance for the Future of Austria (BZÖ)
- Vienna Forum (WIF) – on the ballot only in Donaustadt
- Socialist Left Party (SLP) – on the ballot only in Centre

== Results ==
Party	Votes	%	+/−	Seats	+/−	Coun.	+/−
Social Democratic Party of Austria (SPÖ)	333,611	49.09	+2.18	55	+3	9	±0
Austrian People's Party (ÖVP)	127,531	18.77	+2.38	18	+2	2	±0
The Greens – The Green Alternative (GRÜNE)	99,432	14.63	+2.18	14	+3	2	+1
Freedom Party of Austria (FPÖ)	100,780	14.83	–5.33	13	–8	1	–2
Communist Party of Austria (KPÖ)	9,969	1.47	+0.83	0	±0	0	±0
Alliance for the Future of Austria (BZÖ)	7,824	1.15	New	0	New	0	New
Vienna Forum (WIF)	294	0.04	New	0	New	0	New
Socialist Left Party (SLP)	124	0.02	+0.01	0	±0	0	±0
Invalid/blank votes	14,950	–	–	–	–	–	–
Total	694,515	100	–	100	0	14	–1
Registered voters/turnout	1,142,126	60.81	–5.77	–	–	–	–
Source: Viennese Government

Popular vote
SPÖ	49.09%
ÖVP	18.77%
FPÖ	14.83%
GRÜNE	14.63%
Other	2.68%

Gemeinderat and Landtag seats
SPÖ	55.00%
ÖVP	18.00%
GRÜNE	14.00%
FPÖ	13.00%

=== Results by constituency ===
Constituency	SPÖ		ÖVP		Grüne		FPÖ		Others	Total seats	Turnout
Constituency	%	S	%	S	%	S	%	S	%	Total seats	Turnout
Centre	37.9	3	25.0	2	23.6	2	10.6		2.9	7	59.6
Inner West	34.0	2	24.8	1	29.3	2	9.0		3.0	5	61.2
Leopoldstadt	49.9	2	15.1		17.8	1	14.1		3.0	3	59.0
Landstraße	43.3	2	21.9	1	19.3	1	12.6		3.0	4	59.9
Favoriten	57.7	6	12.1	1	8.1		19.6	2	2.5	9	59.5
Simmering	60.8	3	10.6		7.4		18.8	1	2.4	4	60.0
Meidling	52.3	3	16.0		12.5		16.5		2.7	3	59.2
Hietzing	36.6	1	34.7	1	15.6		11.0		2.1	2	66.5
Penzing	45.8	2	21.6	1	15.2		14.8		2.6	3	61.9
Rudolfsheim-Fünfhaus	51.0	2	13.8		16.4		15.9		2.9	2	55.5
Ottakring	51.5	3	15.8		14.4		15.8		2.5	3	59.9
Hernals	42.5	1	22.4		17.7		14.9		2.5	1	60.2
Währing	32.4	1	33.0	1	22.0		10.3		2.2	2	63.1
Döbling	38.1	1	33.5	1	14.8		11.7		2.0	2	63.7
Brigittenau	56.7	2	12.1		11.7		16.8		2.8	2	58.1
Floridsdorf	57.8	6	13.1	1	9.1		17.0	1	3.1	8	61.4
Donaustadt	57.8	6	13.1	1	9.9	1	16.4	1	2.9	9	61.8
Liesing	51.4	3	19.5	1	12.1		14.5	1	2.5	5	64.9
Remaining seats		6		6		7		7		26	
Total	49.1	55	18.8	18	14.6	14	14.8	13	2.7	100	60.8
Source: Viennese Government
