= Constitution of Vienna =

The Constitution of Vienna is the city-state constitution of the Austrian state of Vienna.

The current constitution was enacted on 15 October 1968, passed by the Municipal Council and Landtag of Vienna.

== History ==
The Constitution of Vienna has been amended 42 times since 1968.

On 10 November 2020, there was a celebration of the history of the constitution on the 100th anniversary of the preceding constitution.

== Structure and content ==
The constitution defines 23 districts for the be city to be administered through.

The constitution allows for referendums.

Vienna's city council has the status of a state parliament.
