= Team HC Strache – Alliance for Austria =

Political party in Austria

Team HC Strache - Alliance for Austria Team HC Strache – Allianz für Österreich
- Chairman: Heinz-Christian Strache
- Deputy chairman: Karl Baron
- General-Secretary: Christian Höbart
- Founded: 12 December 2019
- Split from: Freedom Party of Austria
- Headquarters: Ebendorferstraße 4, 1010 Vienna
- Ideology: Right-wing populism Anti-immigration; Euroscepticism
- Political position: Far-right
- National Council: 0 / 183
- Federal Council: 0 / 61
- State diets: 0 / 440
- European Parliament: 0 / 19

Website
- www.teamhcstrache.at

Team HC Strache – Alliance for Austria (German: Team HC Strache – Allianz für Österreich, HC) is a political party in Austria. It was founded in December 2019 under the name The Alliance for Austria (German: Die Allianz für Österreich, DAÖ) by three former members of the Freedom Party of Austria (FPÖ) led by Karl Baron. In February 2020, former FPÖ leader Heinz-Christian Strache confirmed he would run for the DAÖ in the 2020 Viennese state election. The party subsequently promoted Strache to federal party chairman and adopted its current name. The party failed to win seats in the election.

== Background ==
=== Ibiza affair ===
On 17 May 2019, a secretly-recorded video featuring Freedom Party of Austria (FPÖ) politicians Heinz-Christian Strache and Johann Gudenus was released to the press. In the video, both men appear receptive to proposals by a woman calling herself Alyona Makarova, posing as a niece of Russian businessman Igor Makarov, who suggests providing their party with positive news coverage in return for government contracts. Strache and Gudenus also hint at corrupt practices involving other wealthy donors to the FPÖ in Europe and elsewhere.

After the story broke, then-Vice-Chancellor and FPÖ chairman Strache came under intense pressure to step down. The next day, he announced his resignation from the government and as party leader. The scandal led to the collapse of the federal government and a snap election in which the FPÖ suffered substantial losses. Strache was implicated in further corruption in September, and his FPÖ membership was suspended on 1 October. The same day, he announced his withdrawal from politics.

=== Foundation of the DAÖ ===
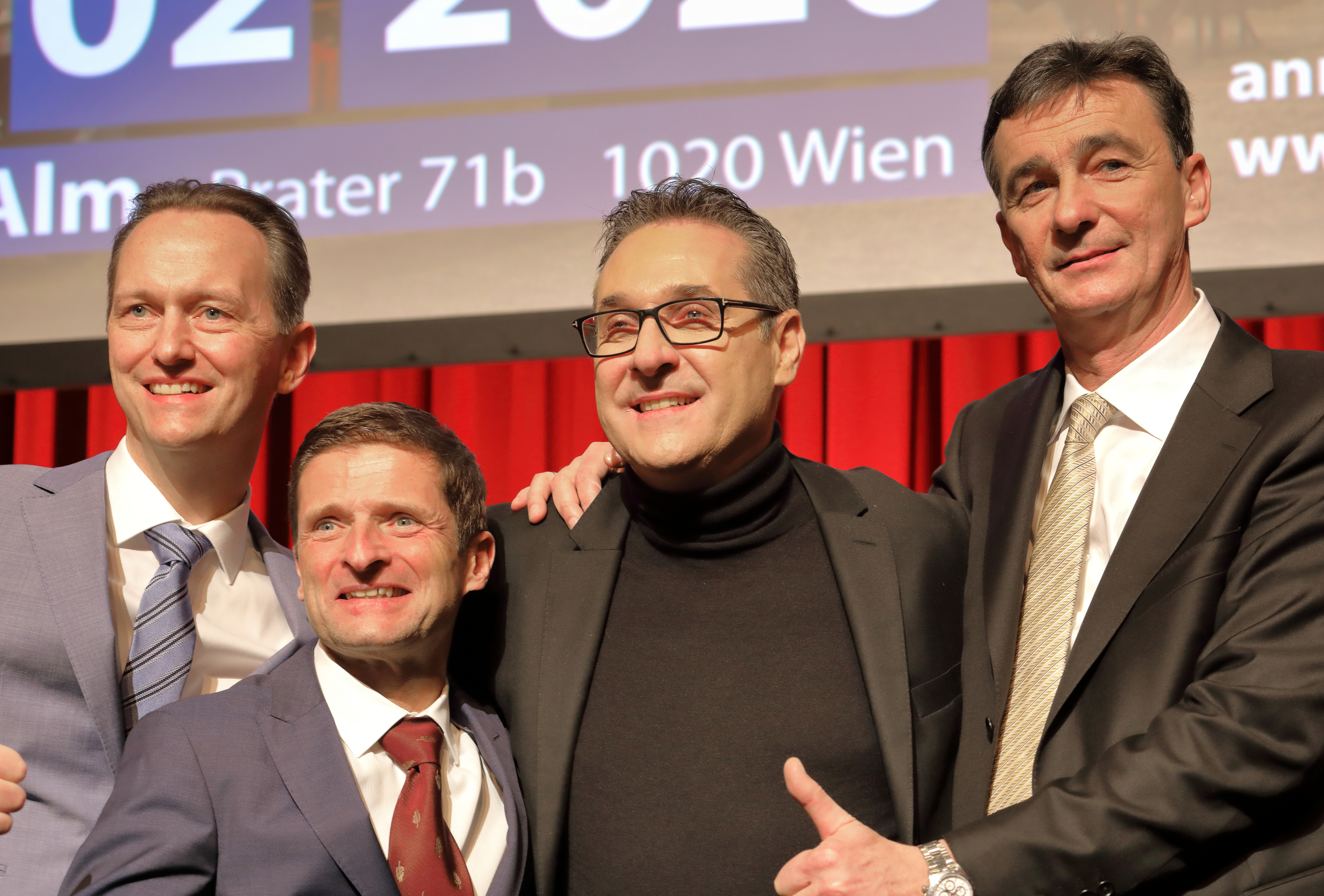
Heinz-Christian Strache with the DAÖ founders at their "New Year's Meeting" in January 2020.

In the Vienna branch of the Freedom Party, where Strache had begun his political career, he still retained some of his popularity. Karl Baron, a strong supporter, was removed as head of the FPÖ's trade association after he voiced his support for Strache to return to politics.

On 12 December 2019, Baron and two other FPÖ members of the Viennese parliament, Dietrich Kops and Klaus Handler, announced that they were leaving the Vienna FPÖ and forming their own party named the Alliance for Austria (DAÖ). They stated their hope that Strache would lead the party in the upcoming Viennese election, and announced his appearance as a speaker at their "New Year's Meeting" on 23 January.

On 13 December, Strache was officially expelled from the FPÖ. He stated that he would consider his next steps over Christmas, and did not rule out a return to politics. On 15 December, he denied having any interest in chairing DAÖ, and stated he hoped for a more sustainable project to assist his return.

Strache indeed appeared as a speaker at the DAÖ conference on 23 January. There, he denigrated the FPÖ, describing its line toward him as "ingratiation", and claimed it had "lost head, heart and soul" after his departure. He announced that he would run in the Viennese state election, though he did not directly confirm that he wanted to do so as the lead candidate of DAÖ, stating he needed to have further discussions before an official announcement was made. David Krutzler of Der Standard described this as a delaying tactic, with which Strache sought to "keep interest in his person simmering".

Another conference was held on 23 February; in the lead-up, Strache announced that he would make his candidacy official there. He stated the party would seek to change its name to "List HC" or a similar title; "HC" is an abbreviation of "Heinz-Christian" and a common nickname for Strache in Austria. At an extraordinary party congress on 14 May, the DAÖ renamed itself to Team HC Strache – Alliance for Austria, and adopted the abbreviation "HC" or "Team HC". Strache was also chosen as party chairman, with Baron becoming deputy.

In July, a fourth FPÖ deputy in the Viennese parliament, Günter Kasal, defected to Team HC.

== 2020 Viennese state election ==
Team HC presented its list for the election in August. As expected, Strache was the lead candidate. The character of a number of candidates came under scrutiny, with one candidate recorded as having chanted anti-Semitic slogans, such as "Soros must go!" and "Rothschild must go!". Another had attended a protest against the Austrian COVID-19 response, at which he had insulted federal Chancellor Sebastian Kurz and questioned whether the SARS-CoV-2 virus actually existed. A third was a professional physician who had expressed anti-vaccination beliefs.

Team HC won 3.3% of votes cast in the election, below the 5% electoral threshold to enter the legislature. Despite this, Strache insisted he would continue with the party and expand beyond Vienna, naming the local elections in Upper Austria as his next goal. The party would not run in the Upper Austria elections.

== 2025 Viennese state election ==
Team HC ran citywide in the 2025 Viennese state election. The threshold to win seats is 5%. The party won 1.10%.
