= LINKS (Austria) =

LEFT LINKS
- Spokespersons: Anna Svec, Can Gülcü, Angelika Adensamer
- Founded: 10 January 2020
- Headquarters: Heinestraße 35/12 1020 Wien
- Ideology: Anti-capitalism; Anti-fascism; Feminism; Minorities interests
- Political position: Left-wing
- European affiliation: Party of the European Left (partner)
- Colours: Purple; Orange
- National Council: 0 / 183
- Federal Council: 0 / 61
- State diets: 0 / 440
- Viennese District councils: 23 / 1,144

Website
- links.wien

The LEFT (German: LINKS) is a small left-wing political party in Vienna, Austria. It was founded in January 2020 and stood for the first time in the 2020 Viennese state election in all districts and constituencies with top candidate Anna Svec. LINKS achieved a total of 23 mandates in 15 Vienna district representatives.

== Formation ==
LINKS was founded on January 10 and 11, 2020 as a party with a view to the Viennese district and municipal council elections in autumn. Around 400 people took part in the founding meeting held in Vienna Rudolfsheim-Fünfhaus. The declared goal of the group is to move into the Vienna City Council and all 23 Vienna district councils. Members of the Vienna KPÖ, the Young Left, Wien anders as well as organizers of the Thursday demonstrations critical of the government and numerous people who were already involved in the Aufbruch project participated in the founding meeting of LINKS. In addition, smaller left-wing organizations such as Collective Left and the Workers Viewpoint took part. At the founding meeting, principles and an organizational structure were decided, and three speakers and a coordination team were elected.

== Political positions ==
LINKS describes itself as an anti-capitalist, anti-racist, feminist and solidary political force. LINKS advocates a reduction in working hours to 30 hours per week, a minimum wage of 1,950 euros net (27,842 net per year) and "unconditional livelihood security of 1,500 euros for all Viennese – regardless of whether they are unemployed, part-time or work in the household". For around 30 percent of the Viennese population without Austrian citizenship, LINKS calls for a "right to vote for everyone after one year of residence". In order to “finance the exit from oil and gas and net zero greenhouse gas emissions by 2030”, LINKS demands a “climate tax for all companies based in Vienna based on the subway tax model”.

== Participation in the 2020 Viennese election ==
LINKS ran for the first time in the Vienna district and municipal council elections on October 11, 2020. The top candidate from the left for the Vienna municipal council election 2020 was legal advisor Anna Svec. Together with Angelika Adensamer (2nd place) and Can Gülcü (3rd place), she formed the top trio for the municipal council level. The list in the Wieden district was headed by District Councilor Amela Mirković, who had left the Vienna Greens in February 2020 and switched to LINKS. The five district councilors of the electoral alliance Vienna differently elected in 2015 – Josef Iraschko (Leopoldstadt), Susanne Empacher (Landstraße), Wolf-Goetz Jurjans (Margareten), Didi Zach (Rudolfsheim-Fünfhaus) and Fritz Fink (Ottakring) – ran for candidates in their respective districts on the first list position for LINKS. The list in the Floridsdorf district was headed by the well-known health expert and former SPÖ politician Christoph Baumgärtel, who previously had headed an SPÖ section in Floridsdorf, then had made Langenzersdorf known throughout Austria before leaving the SPÖ in December 2019 and becoming a founding member of LINKS in January 2020.

While the entry into the municipal council failed with a result of 14,919 votes or 2.06%, a total of 23 seats were achieved in the district representative elections in 15 districts; Floridsdorf was not among them.
