= Maria Vassilakou =

Austrian politician

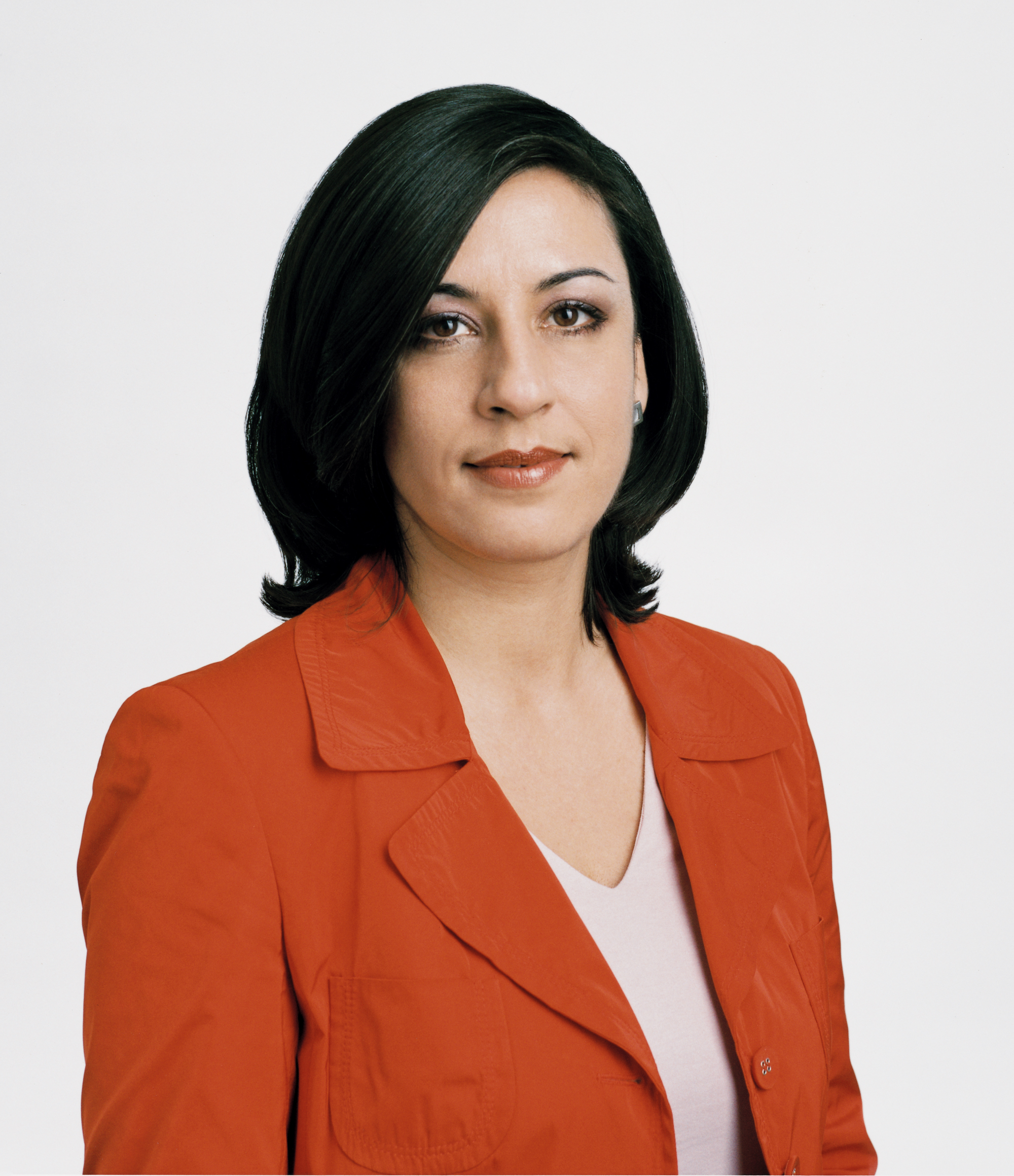

Deputy Mayor and Deputy Governor of Vienna Executive City Councillor for Urban Planning, Traffic & Transport, Climate Protection, Energy Planning and Public Participation
- In office 25 November 2010 – 26 June 2019 Serving with Dominik Nepp
- Governor: Michael Häupl; Michael Ludwig
- Succeeded by: Birgit Hebein

Executive City Councillor for Urban Planning, Traffic & Transport, Climate Protection, Energy Planning and Public Participation
- In office 9 March 2011 – 1 January 2012
- Governor: Michael Häupl

Personal details
- Born: 23 February 1969 (age 56); Athens, Greece
- Political party: Green Party

Maria Vassilakou (Greek: Μαρία Βασιλάκου; born 23 February 1969) is a Greek-born Austrian politician. She served as leader of the Viennese Green Party from 2004 to 2010 and Deputy Mayor and Deputy Governor of Vienna from 2010 to 2019, as well as Executive Councillor for Urban Planning, Traffic & Transport, Climate Protection, Energy Planning and Public Participation (Stadtentwicklung, Verkehr, Klimaschutz, Energieplanung und BürgerInnenbeteiligung). Her successor is Green Party politician Birgit Hebein.
