= Dominik Nepp =

Austrian politician (born 1982)

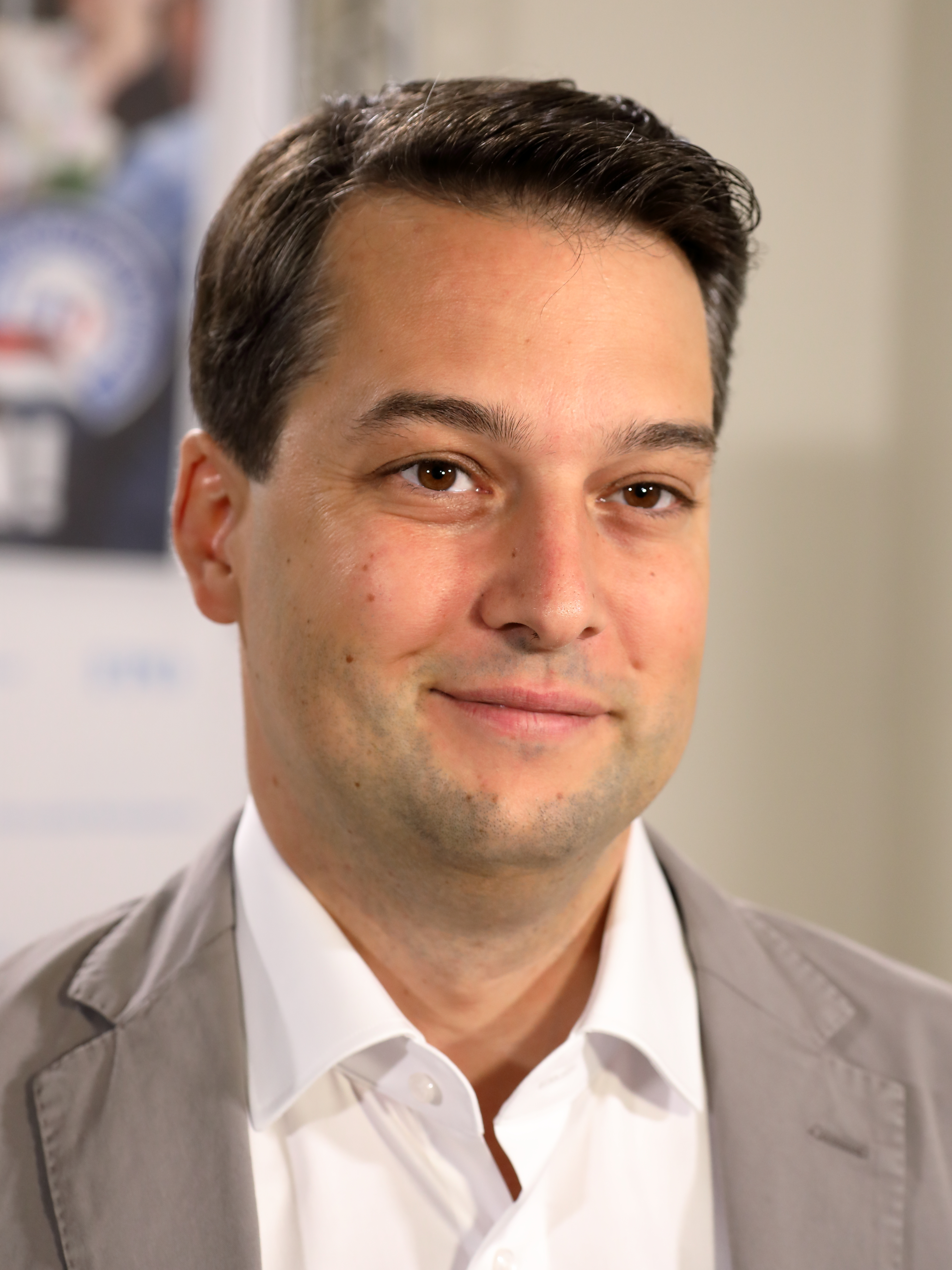

Leader of the Freedom Party of Austria in Vienna
- Incumbent
- Assumed office 19 May 2019
- Preceded by: Heinz-Christian Strache

Deputy Mayor of Vienna (non-executive)
- Incumbent
- Assumed office December 2017
- Preceded by: Johann Gudenus

City Councillor of Vienna (non-executive)
- Incumbent
- Assumed office December 2017
- Preceded by: Johann Gudenus

Leader of the Freedom Party of Austria in the Gemeinderat and Landtag of Vienna
- In office October 2015 – December 2017
- Preceded by: Johann Gudenus
- Succeeded by: Anton Mahdalik

Member of the Gemeinderat and Landtag of Vienna
- Incumbent
- Assumed office 10 October 2010

Personal details
- Born: 14 February 1982 (age 44) Vienna, Austria
- Party: Freedom
- Children: 2

Dominik Nepp (born 14 February 1982) is an Austrian politician who has been leader of the Freedom Party (FPÖ) in Vienna since 2019. He has been non-executive deputy Mayor and city councillor in the government of Vienna since 2017.

== Personal life ==
Nepp graduated from the Billrothstraße Gymnasium in Vienna in 2000. From 2013 to 2017, he completed a four-semester Master's course in Leadership, Politics and Management at the University of Applied Sciences Campus Vienna and graduated with the Master of Arts in Political Management, not to be confused with the academic degree of the same name, Master of Arts (MA).

He is married to Barbara Nepp, who was appointed to the ORF Public Council in 2018, and has two daughters.

== Political career ==
Nepp was a member of the Ring Freiheitlicher Jugend (RFJ), the youth branch of the Freedom Party. He was deputy chairman of RFJ Döbling from 2000 to 2003, then chairman from 2003 to 2006. From April to June 2006, he was deputy regional chairman at the RFJ Vienna, and from June 2006 to September 2007 managing regional chairman. In September 2007 he became chairman of the RFJ Vienna, and from September 2009 to 2012 he also served as federal chairman of the RFJ.

Nepp briefly served as deputy leader of FPÖ Döbling from March to September 2006. From 2005 to 2010 he was a district councillor in Döbling; since March 2008 he has also been chairman of FPÖ Döbling. He was elected to the Gemeinderat and Landtag of Vienna in the 2010 Viennese state election, and was re-elected in 2015. After the 2015 state election, Nepp became chairman of the FPÖ parliamentary group in the Viennese parliament, as the successor to Johann Gudenus.

In December 2017, he succeeded Gudenus as non-executive city councillor and deputy Mayor of Vienna. He was replaced as parliamentary leader by Anton Mahdalik.

In May 2019, after the resignation of Heinz-Christian Strache during the Ibiza affair, Nepp was designated leader of FPÖ Vienna.

In November 2019, he was selected as the FPÖ's lead candidate in the 2020 Viennese state election.
