= Birgit Hebein =

Austrian politician (born 1967)

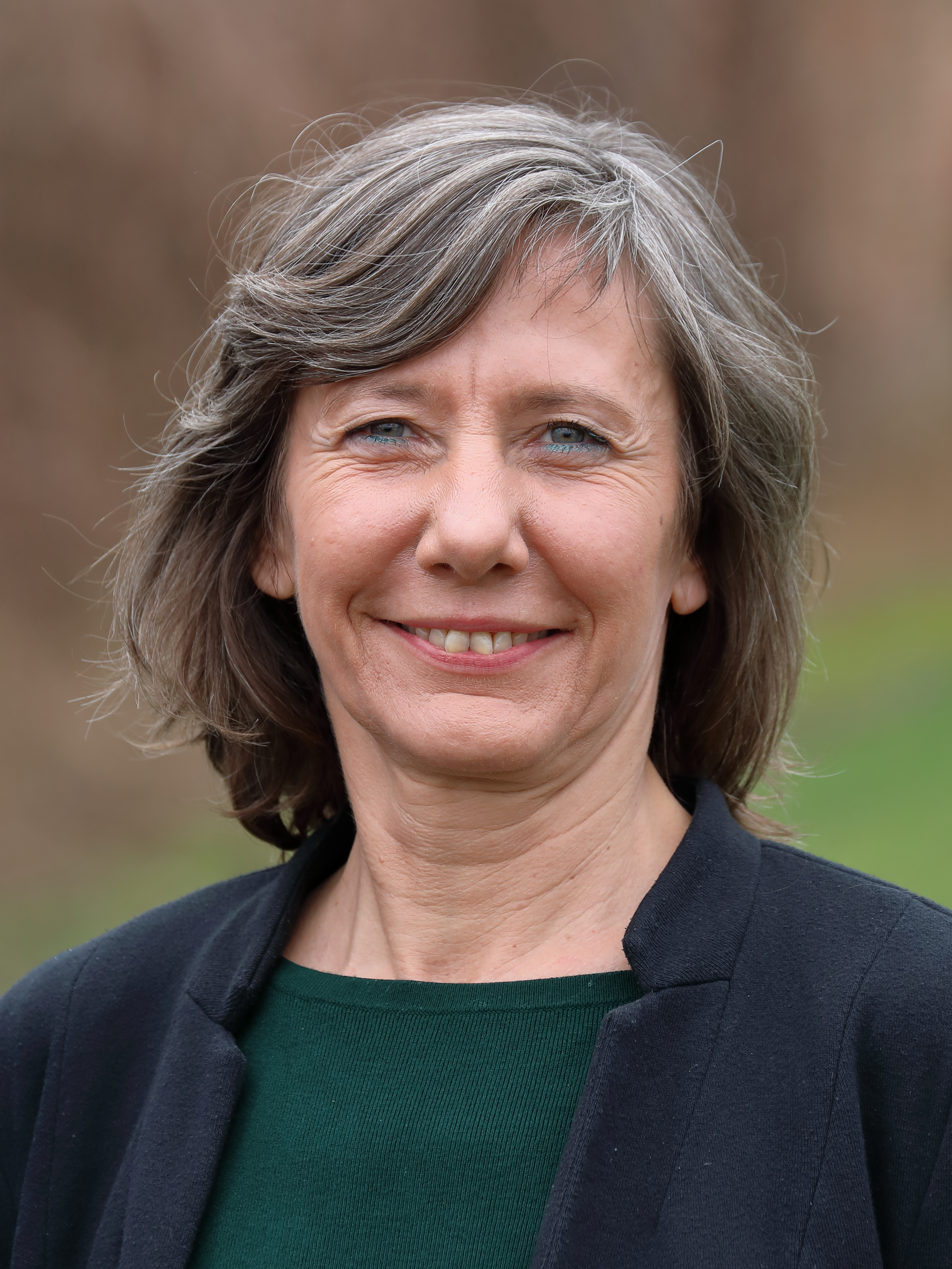
- Hebein in 2020

Deputy Mayor of Vienna
- In office 26 June 2019 – 24 November 2020
- Preceded by: Maria Vassilakou
- Succeeded by: Christoph Wiederkehr

Leader of The Greens in Vienna
- In office 22 June 2019 – 18 January 2021
- Preceded by: Office established
- Succeeded by: Peter Kristofel (interim)

City Councillor for Urban Development, Transport, Climate Protection, Energy Planning, and Citizen Participation
- In office 26 June 2019 – 24 November 2020
- Preceded by: Maria Vassilakou
- Succeeded by: Kathrin Gaál (Housing, Urban Renewal, and Women); Jürgen Czernohorszky (Climate, the Environment, and Citizen Participation)

Member of the Gemeinderat and Landtag of Vienna
- In office 10 October 2010 – 22 June 2019

Personal details
- Born: Birgit Hebein; 13 January 1967 (age 59) Villach, Carinthia
- Party: The Greens – The Green Alternative (until 2021)
- Children: 2

Birgit Hebein (born 13 January 1967) is a former Austrian politician of The Greens. She served as Deputy Mayor of Vienna and City Councillor for Urban Development, Transport, Climate Protection, Energy Planning, and Citizen Participation from 2019 to 2020. At the same time, she was chairwoman of the Vienna Greens. Prior, who served as a member of the Gemeinderat and Landtag of Vienna from 2010 to 2019. She resigned as party leader in January 2021, and later resigned her party membership in August, citing the policies of the ÖVP–Green federal government.

== Personal life ==
Hebein has lived in Vienna since 1986. She is a qualified social worker, and was employed by Caritas Vienna from 1990 to 1992. She also worked in other NGO areas and was active in the conscientious objection group Gruppe für Totalverweigerung (Group for Total Refusal).

== Political career ==
Hebein was responsible for security policy in the Austrian Students' Association from 1996 to 1997. She was elected district councillor for Rudolfsheim-Fünfhaus on the Greens list in the 2005 local elections, and served as group chairwoman from 2007. Hebein was elected to the Gemeinderat and Landtag in the 2010 Viennese state election. Thereafter she served as social affairs spokeswoman for the Vienna Greens.

Hebein is secretary of the communist youth organisation "Free Austrian Youth - Movement for Socialism" (FÖJ-BfS).

When hundreds of refugees arrived at Vienna's Westbahnhof railway station in early September 2015, Hebein organized and negotiated with the authorities and ÖBB. In 2018 she drew attention to herself through her commitment to negotiations for the new Vienna minimum income and criticism of the alcohol ban in public spaces. She argued that the ban only leads to displacement, and suggested instead that moderate alcohol consumption should be permitted in care facilities for the homeless so that they do not have to rely on public space.

=== 2018 Greens leadership election ===
In November 2018, the Vienna Greens held an election to determine their lead candidate for the next state election. After incumbent Deputy Mayor and two-time lead candidate Maria Vassilakou announced her pending retirement and decision not to compete, the election was considered an open contest. Hebein announced her candidacy two days later on 4 September. She was considered a dark horse candidate, described by Der Standard as a representative of the left "Fundi" wing of the party. Hebein won 33% of votes cast in the first round, placing second behind Peter Kraus and ahead of candidates David Ellensohn, Benjamin Kaan, and Marihan Abensperg-Traun. In the fourth and final round of voting, she won the election with 49% of votes to Kraus's 45% (the remainder were invalid). Contrary to the speculation of commentators, she clarified that she would continue the Greens' coalition with the SPÖ until the scheduled election date in 2020. Her reputation as a left-winger was reinforced by a widely-reported quip she made shortly after her victory: "Yes, of course I do left-wing politics. What else?"

During her first major appearance in front of the party base on 1 December, Hebein voiced her support for a restructuring and opening of the Greens. She stated her aim was to make the party more nimble and action-oriented, but that they should remain ecologically-centred.

=== Deputy Mayor ===
Upon Maria Vassilakou's retirement from politics in June 2019, Hebein succeeded her as deputy Mayor and city councillor. The Greens' state congress held at the time voted to change the statutes and, for the first time, establish the office of party chairperson. Hebein thus became the first party chairwoman of the Vienna Greens.

At a party conference in February 2020, Hebein was formally chosen as the Greens' lead candidate for the October state election.

The Greens won 14.8% in the election, their best result to date. They increased their representation in the Gemeinderat and Landtag from 10 to 16 seats. Afterwards, Hebein called for a renewal of the incumbent SPÖ–Green government, citing the result as a "very clear mandate" for its continuation.

However, the SPÖ opted to form a coalition with NEOS rather than renew the incumbent government. After it became clear that the Greens would return to opposition, Hebein unsuccessfully sought election as Greens parliamentary chair, as well as to each of the Greens' non-executive city council positions. Afterwards, she announced she would not take up her seat in the Gemeinderat and Landtag. Shortly before the swearing-in of the new city government, she announced she planned to resign as state party leader prior to the scheduled end of her term in 2021. Hebein left office as Vice Mayor and city councillor on 24 November.

Hebein resigned as Greens chairwoman on 18 January 2021, and party secretary Peter Kristofel became interim leader. She was succeeded full-time by Judith Pühringer and Peter Kraus in October.

On 22 August, Hebein announced that she had resigned her membership of the Greens in protest against the direction of the ÖVP–Green federal government. She stated that the ÖVP had violated the coalition agreement by refusing to accept refugees from Afghanistan, and that the Greens had failed to challenge them. She voiced concern about the coalition pact at large, saying: "If we look at it honestly, we have reached the limit with the already-daring strategy to correct course with government participation," and that the social and political atmosphere of the country had continued "developing in turquoise-authoritarian direction ... as if nothing had changed."
