= Municipal Council and Landtag of Vienna =

Legislative bodies in Vienna, Austria

Gemeinderat and Landtag of Vienna Wiener Gemeinderat und Landtag

Type
- Type: Landtag
- Houses: Gemeinderat; Landtag

History
- Founded: Gemeinderat: 1848; Landtag: 10 November 1920

Leadership
- Chairman of the Gemeinderat: Thomas Reindl (SPÖ)
- President of the Landtag: Ernst Woller (SPÖ)

Structure
- Seats: 100
- Political groups: Government (53): SPÖ (43); NEOS (10); Opposition (47): FPÖ (22); GRÜNE (15); ÖVP (10)
- Length of term: five years

Elections
- Last election: 27 April 2025

Meeting place
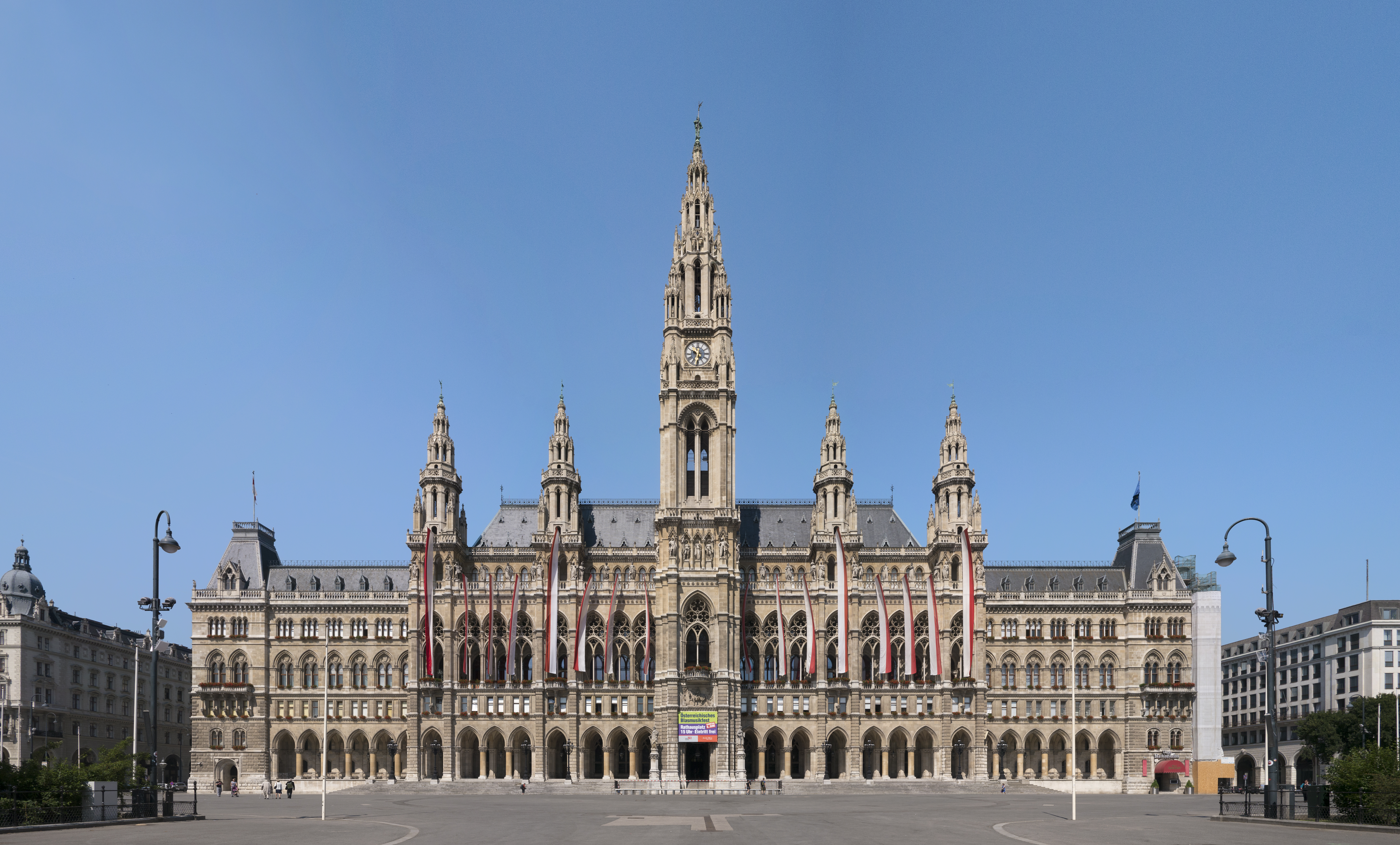
- Vienna City Hall; Rathausplatz, Vienna

Website
- wien.gv.at

As Vienna, the capital of Austria is both a city and a state, the 100 members of the Municipal Council (Gemeinderat) of the city of Vienna also act as members of the Landtag (legislative assembly) of the state of Vienna. Members serve for five years.

While the municipal council and the state parliament consist of the same members, they meet separately, complete with separate presiding officers: the chairman of the Municipal Council and the President of the Landtag. This is because the Vienna City Constitution requires city and state business to be kept separate. When the deputies meet as the Municipal Council, they can only deal with matters of the city, but not the affairs of the state. When the deputies meet as the Landtag, they may only deal with the matters of the state, but not the affairs of the city. Thus, the legal situation in Vienna is different to that in other city-states such as Berlin, Moscow, or Singapore.

== Gemeinderat of Vienna ==
The Gemeinderat, formed for the first time after the revolution in 1848 on the basis of the provisional municipal law of March 17, 1849, issued by the imperial patent, was correspondingly enlarged in the following decades. After the incorporation of Floridsdorf in 1904/1905 the Gemeinderat comprised 165 representatives until 1923. The legal provisions for this were decided by the Landtag of Lower Austria as the State Law.

The municipal council could only be elected by all citizens living in Vienna after 1918. Before then, the leading classes of Vienna and Lower Austria had prevented the general right to vote, realized for men in Cisleithania in 1907, in the municipal and state policy.

In the Vienna city constitution, the Gemeinderat is mentioned before the Landtag, as was decided by the Federal Constitutional Law, which entered into force on the same day as the city constitution. It is, therefore, the municipal council that is the supreme collegial body of the statutory city of Vienna.

In 1923, the number of representatives in the Gemeinderat/Landtag was reduced to 120, and in 1929 (first applied in the 1932 election) to 100 (the number it still has today).

In the Austrofascist dictatorship of 1934-1938, the municipal council was replaced by the parliament of Vienna.

The Gemeinderat has elected the mayor (who since November 10, 1920, also serves as the Landeshauptmann, or governor of the state of Vienna) and the (executive) city councils since June 1, 1920. These have also functioned simultaneously as members of the Viennese regional government since November 10, 1920. In addition, the Gemeinderat controls all other community bodies and decides on budget and clearance (including the state budget, which is not separate). It also decides on all the city's major expenditures, the city plan, the service plan and the business division for Wiener Stadtsenat and the Viennese provincial government. It is, therefore, a very busy body, also with the municipal councils for the individual business groups of the magistrate. The municipal council is to be understood legally as an organ of the executive branch, since municipalities in Austria do not have their own legislation, but have to implement federal and state laws.

Since 1918, the Social Democrats have been the largest party in the Municipal Council/Landtag at every free election. The only break in this tradition came from 1934 to 1945, when the democratic form of government was interrupted and the mayors were appointed by the government (by the Austrofascist Federal State of Austria from 1934 to 1938, and by the Nazis from 1938 to 1945). The pre-1934 legal situation was restored with the return of peace in 1945.

== Landtag of Vienna ==
The Municipal Council of the city of Vienna has also functioned as the Landtag of the State of Vienna since November 10, 1920. On that day, the Federal Constitution passed by the Austrian Constitutional Assembly on 1 October 1920 entered into force, which defined Vienna as a separate federal state and laid down rules for the legal and economic separation of Vienna from Lower Austria. The "municipal council as a state parliament" passed the Viennese city constitution that is essentially valid up to today on November 10, 1920, which was promulgated in the first edition of the state law gazette for Vienna. On 1 January 1922, the "separation law", which had been resolved by the Viennese and the Lower Austrian Landtag on 29 December 1921, entered into force. After long negotiations, the property of the former state of Lower Austria was divided between the two new states.

The Landtag has the right to legislate for provincial and constitutional laws; state competencies are determined by the Federal Constitutional Law. Legislative drafts can be introduced as government bills, by means of initiative motions (supported by at least five regional deputies) or by referendums to the Landtag. Like the other state parliaments in Austria, the Viennese state parliament is hardly active intensively, since the provincial legislature has only a few competencies. The existence and size of the state parliaments have therefore led to controversial discussions for several years. The controversy has little interest in the Viennese parliament, however, since its deputies are mostly active as municipal councillors.

== Meeting place ==
Until June 20, 1885 the Gemeinderat met in the meeting room in the Altes Rathaus, which is now used by the District Authority of the 1st District, Innere Stadt. Since then the Gemeinderat has met in the (New) Rathaus, completed in 1883, and has met there as the Landtag since 10 November 1920. The council chamber was originally equipped with its own carriage driveway on Friedrich-Schmidt-Platz. From there (today a back entrance to the Rathaus) staircases 7 and 8 lead directly to the council chamber on the first floor. Access to the visitor and press galleries is from the second floor.

== See also ==
- Constitution of Vienna
- Distribution of seats in the Austrian Landtage
