= Timeline of Graz =

Coordinates: 47.066667°N 15.433333°E

The following is a timeline of the history of the city of Graz, Austria.

== Prior to 14th century ==
- 1180 – Graz becomes capital of the Duchy of Styria.
- 1239 – Graz Friary active.

== 14th–16th centuries ==
- 1379 – Graz becomes capital of Inner Austria; Leopold III in power.
- 1438 – Graz Castle built.
- 1462 – Graz Cathedral built.
- 1560 – Clock tower built on the Schlossberg.
- 1585 – University of Graz founded.
- 1588 – Belltower built on the Schlossberg.
- 1590 – Dobel Castle built.

== 17th–18th centuries ==
- 1619 – Habsburg Ferdinand II becomes Holy Roman Emperor; relocates from Graz to Vienna.
- 1635 – Eggenberg Palace built (approximate date).
- 1640 – Mausoleum of Ferdinand II, Holy Roman Emperor consecrated.
- 1645 – Styrian Armoury built.
- 1652 – Grabenkirche (church) dedicated.
- 1724 – Mariatrost Basilica (church) built.
- 1776 – Schauspielhaus Graz (theatre) built.
- 1780 – Count John D'Alton becomes Governor.
- 1786 – Catholic See of Seckau prince-bishop residence relocated to Graz.
- 1794 – Prison in use.
- 1797 – French in power.

== 19th century ==
- 1809 – June: Battle of Graz.
- 1811
  - Landesmuseum Joanneum (museum) established.
  - Graz University of Technology founded by Archduke John of Austria
- 1816 – Music school established.
- 1823 – Population: 40,000 (approximate).
- 1828 – Graz Mutual Insurance Company founded.
- 1844 – Southern Railway in operation (approximate date).
- 1847 – Central Railway Station opens.
- 1850 – Historical Society of Styria founded.
- 1855 – Grazer Telegraf newspaper begins publication.
- 1864 – Technical High School and Thalía Theatre active.
- 1872 – Grazer Waggon- & Maschinen-Fabriks-Aktiengesellschaft (manufacturer) in business.
- 1876 – Steiermärkische Fechtklub (fencing club) founded.
- 1878 – Horse trams begin operating.
- 1885 – Grazer Congress (concert hall) built.
- 1887 – Sacred Heart of Jesus Church built.
- 1888 - Grazer Alpenclub (hiking club) formed.
- 1889 – Club der Amateurfotografen (photography club) founded.
- 1894 – Schlossbergbahn funicular railway begins operating.
- 1899
  - Graz Opera house inaugurated.
  - Electric tram begins operating.
- 1900 – Population: 138,370.

== 20th century ==
=== 1900s–1950s ===
- 1902 – Grazer AK (sports club) formed.
- 1904 – Kleine Zeitung newspaper begins publication.
- 1909
  - SK Sturm Graz (football club) formed.
  - Grand Hotel Wiesler in business.
- 1912 – LKH-Universitätsklinikum (hospital) built.
- 1913 – Volkskundemuseum (folkloric museum) opens.
- 1914 – September: Talerhof concentration camp in operation near city.
- 1919 – Vinzenz Muchitsch becomes mayor.
- 1920 - Population: 157,032.
- 1925 – Graz Airport active.
- 1938
  - February: City becomes part of Nazi Germany.
  - Julius Kaspar becomes mayor.
- 1941 – Trolleybuses begin operating.
- 1945
  - Allied occupation of Austria begins; Styria overseen by British forces.
  - Eduard Speck becomes mayor.
  - Die Wahrheit communist newspaper begins publication.
- 1951
  - Population: 226,476.
  - Die Aula magazine begins publication.
- 1955 – July: Allied occupation of Austria ends per Austrian State Treaty.

=== 1960s–1990s ===
- 1960
  - Gustav Scherbaum becomes mayor.
  - Hafnerriegel (residence building) constructed.
  - Forum Stadtpark (art gallery) opens.
- 1963 – Eisstadion Liebenau (sports arena) built.
- 1971 – Tramway Museum Graz founded.
- 1973 – Alexander Götz becomes mayor.
- 1985 – Alfred Stingl becomes mayor.
- 1993 – Nausner & Nausner Verlag (publisher) in business.
- 1995 – Das Megaphon newspaper begins publication.
- 1997 – Schwarzenegger-Stadium opens.
- 1998
  - Diagonale film festival active.
  - Schreibkraft magazine founded.
- 1999 – Old Town designated an UNESCO World Heritage Site.

== 21st century ==
- 2001
  - Magna Steyr automobile manufacturer headquartered in Graz.
  - Springfestival begins.
- 2002 – Stadthalle Graz (assembly hall) opens.
- 2003
  - Graz Art Museum built.
  - City designated a European Capital of Culture.
  - Murinsel (amphitheatre) opens.
  - Homeless World Cup football contest held.
  - Siegfried Nagl becomes mayor.
- 2005 – Elevate Festival begins.
- 2007
  - Rondo built.
  - Einkaufszentrum Murpark (shopping mall) in business.
- 2013 – Population: 265,778.
- 2015 – A van and knife attack kills three and injures 36.
- 2016 - Overnight stays in Graz Hotels exceed 1.1 million for the first time.
- 2025 - A school shooting kills ten and injures at least 30.

== See also ==
- Graz history
- History of Graz
- List of mayors of Graz
- List of churches in Graz
- History of Styria
- Timelines of other cities in Austria: Linz, Salzburg, Vienna

== Bibliography ==
published in 17th-19th centuries

- Zeiller, Martin (1649). "Gratz". Topographia Provinciarum Austriacarum Austriae, Styriae, Carinthiae, Carniolae, Tyrolis. Topographia Germaniae (in German). Frankfurt. p. 68+.
- "Gratz", Handbook for Travellers in Southern Germany (9th ed.), London: J. Murray, 1863
- Charles Knight, ed. (1867). "Gratz". English Cyclopaedia. London. hdl:2027/nyp.33433000064802.
- Graz; Geschichte und Topographie der Stadt und ihrer Umgebung (in German), Verlag der Geschäftsführung der 48. Versammlung der deutschen Naturforscher und Ärzte, 1875
- W. Pembroke Fetridge (1881), "Gratz", Harper's Hand-book for Travellers in Europe and the East, New York: Harper & Brothers
- Graz, Illustrated Europe, Zürich: Orell Füssli & Co., c. 1890s
- Norddeutscher Lloyd (1896), "Gratz", Guide through Germany, Austria-Hungary, Italy, Switzerland, France, Belgium, Holland and England, Berlin: J. Reichmann & Cantor, OCLC 8395555

published in 20th century

- "Graz" . Encyclopædia Britannica. Vol. 12 (11th ed.). 1911. pp. 395–396.
- "Gratz", Austria-Hungary (11th ed.), Leipzig: Karl Baedeker, 1911, OL 18759934M (+ 1871 ed., 1907 ed.)
- William H. Hubbard (1980). "Aspects of Social Mobility in Graz, 1857–1880". Historical Social Research (14): 3–26. JSTOR 20754660.
