= Timeline of Linz =

The following is a timeline of the history of the city of Linz, Austria.

== Prior to 19th century ==
- ca.400 CE - Roman fortress of Lentia
- 799 CE - First mention of the name Linz
- 823 CE - Archbishop of Passau in power.
- 1190 - Babenberger Leopold V in power (approximate date).
- 1210 - Linzer Schloss (castle) expanded (approximate date).
- 1236 - Siege by Bavarians.
- 1251 - Ottokar II of Bohemia in power.
- 1260 - Provincial administration based in the castle by Ottokar II of Bohemia.
- 1324 - City rights granted.
- 1391 - First mention of a prison at the castle.
- 1489 - Meeting of Frederick III, Holy Roman Emperor and Matthias Corvinus, King of Hungary.
- 1490 - Linz becomes capital of Österreich ob der Enns province.
- 1497 - Bridge built.
- 1564 - Linzer Landhaus construction begins.
- 1619 - Castle seized by Protestant rebels.
- 1620 - Bavaria in power.
- 1626 - Peasants' War: castle besieged by the peasants.
- 1628 - Austria in power.
- 1659 - Town Hall expanded.
- 1680 - Count Raimondo Montecuccoli a professional soldier, died in Linz.
- 1682 - Church of Ignatius built.
- 1684 - 5 March: Holy League alliance established in the city between the Holy Roman Empire, Polish-Lithuanian Commonwealth and Republic of Venice.
- 1723 - Trinity Column, Linz erected on the Hauptplatz (Linz).
- 1725 - Deutschordenskirche Linz (church) built.
- 1741 - Linz taken by Bavarian forces during the War of the Austrian Succession.
- 1742 - Linz recovered from the Bavarians.
- 1785 - Roman Catholic Diocese of Linz established.
- 1786 - Army barracks placed in the castle.
- 1800 - Fire.

== 19th century ==
- 1803 - Linz State Theatre built.
- 1809 - 3 May: Battle of Ebelsberg fought near Linz during the War of the Fifth Coalition.
- 1811 - Prison located in the castle.
- 1833 - Museum Francisco-Carolinum founded.
- 1836 - Turmbefestigung Linz (fortification) built.
- 1851 - Prison relocated from the castle to Garsten. Army barracks placed in the castle.
- 1858
  - Linz Hauptbahnhof (main railway station) opened.
  - Vienna-Linz railway begins operating.
- 1864 - Neustadtviertel development begins.
- 1865 - Tages-Post (Linz) newspaper begins publication.
- 1869 - Linzer Volksblatt (newspaper) begins publication.
- 1873 - Lustenau (Linz) and Waldegg (Linz) become part of Linz.
- 1877 - Linz Synagogue built.
- 1880 - Horsecar tram begins operating.
- 1890 - Population: 47,560.

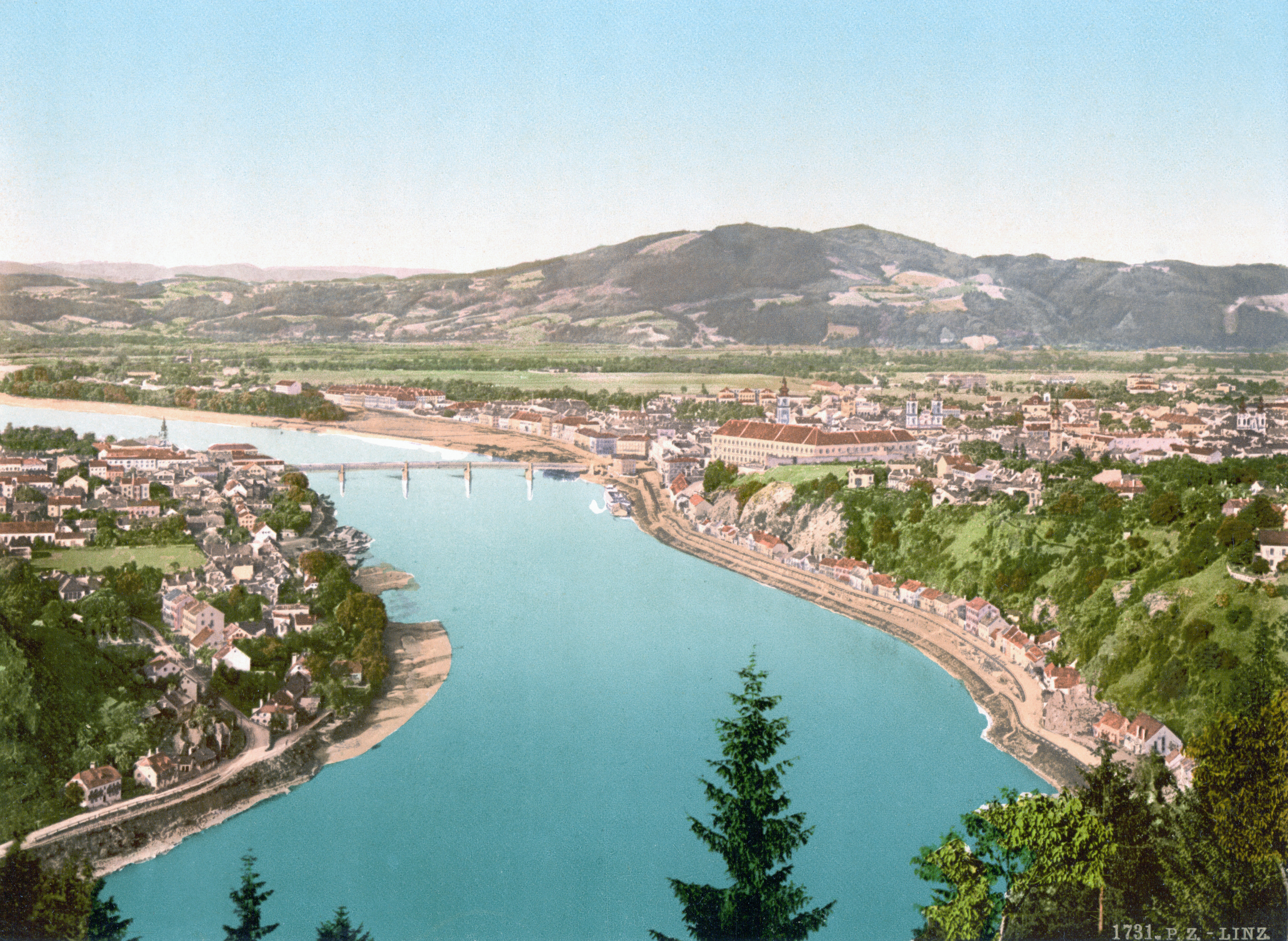
Linz at the turn of the 19th and 20th centuries

- 1896 - Oberösterreichische Landesarchiv (regional archives) headquartered in Linz.^{(de)}
- 1898 - Pöstlingbergbahn (railway) begins operating.
- 1899 - Flood.
- 1900
  - Linzer Eisenbahnbrücke (bridge) opens.
  - Population: 58,778.

== 20th century ==
- 1909 - Central Kino (Linz) (cinema) opens on Landstraße (Linz).
- 1910 - Population: 67,817.
- 1915 - St. Peter (Linz) becomes part of Linz.
- 1919 - Pöstlingberg (district) and Urfahr become part of Linz.
- 1920 - Population: 93,473.
- 1923
  - Kleinmünchen becomes part of Linz.
  - Linzer Volksstimme newspaper begins publication.
- 1924 - Cathedral of the Immaculate Conception consecrated.
- 1926 - Amtliche Linzer Zeitung (newspaper) begins publication.
- 1933 - Christkönigkirche (Linz) (church) built.
- 1934 - 12 February: Austrian Civil War begins at the Hotel Schiff in Linz, where the Social Democratic Party of Austria kept an office.
- 1936 - Tabakfabrik Linz (tobacco factory) built.
- 1937 - Linz designated a "Führer city" by Hitler.

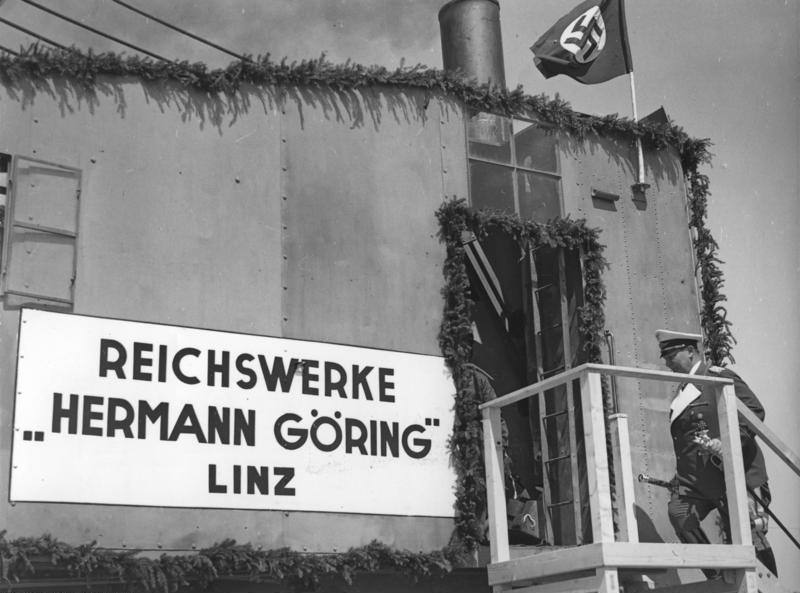
Hermann Göring in Linz in 1938

- 1938
  - 12 March: Hitler arrives in Linz during the annexation of Austria into Nazi Germany.
  - Linz becomes seat of the Nazi Reichsgau Oberdonau (administrative division).
  - Mauthausen-Gusen concentration camp begins operating near Linz.
  - Ebelsberg and St. Magdalena (Linz) become part of Linz.
  - Eisenwerke Oberdonau (steelworks) begins operating.
- 1939 - Keferfeld becomes part of Linz.
- 1940
  - Nibelungenbrücke (Linz) (bridge) built.
  - Linz Städtischen Symphonieorchester (orchestra) formed.
- 1943
  - 11 January: Linz I subcamp of the Mauthausen concentration camp established. Its prisoners were mostly from German-occupied Poland, Yugoslavia, Soviet Union and Germany.
  - Bruckner Orchestra Linz active.
- 1944
  - Bombing by Allied forces during World War II.
  - 21 February: Linz II subcamp of Mauthausen established. Its prisoners were mostly from German-occupied Poland and Soviet Union.
  - Oberleitungsbus Linz begins operating.
  - 26 May: Linz III subcamp of Mauthausen established. Its prisoners were mostly from German-occupied Soviet Union and Poland.
  - 3 August: Linz I subcamp dissolved, prisoners moved to the Linz III subcamp.
- 1945
  - Bombing by Allied forces.
  - May: Prisoners of the Linz II subcamp are either moved to the Linz III subcamp or sent on a death march to the main Mauthausen camp. Subcamp dissolved.
  - 5 May: Allied forces take city. Linz III subcamp liberated by American troops.
  - Oberösterreichische Nachrichten newspaper begins publication.
- 1947 - University of Art and Design Linz established
- 1952
  - Linzer Stadion (stadium) opens.
  - Linz Botanical Garden established.
- 1962 - St. Theresia (Linz) church built.
- 1965 - Memorial stone to former prisoners of the Linz I and Linz III subcamps of the Mauthausen concentration camp erected.
- 1966 - Hochschule für Sozial- und Wirtschaftswissenschaften (school) established.

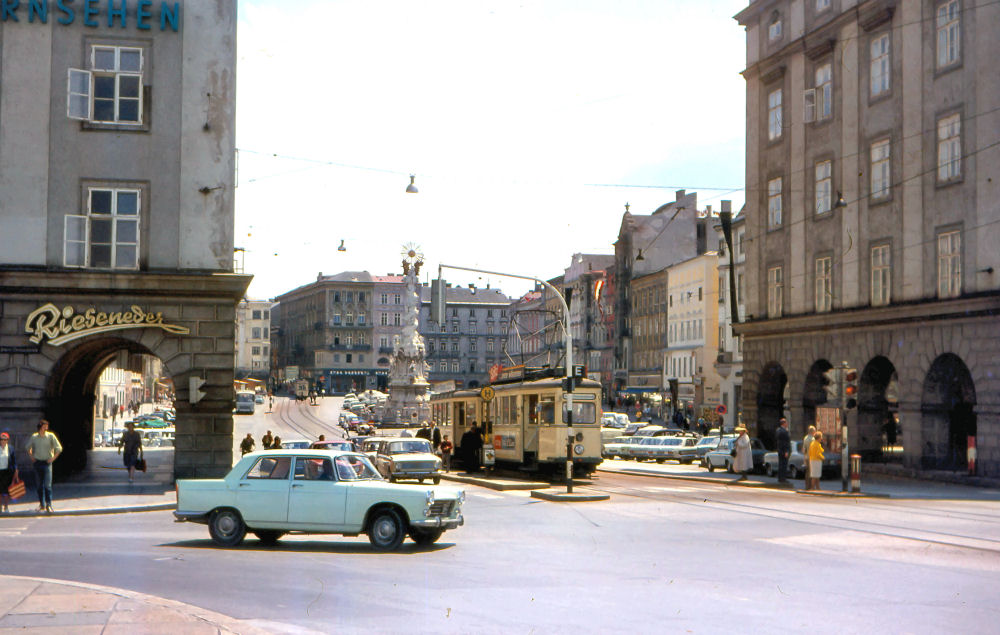
Linz in 1972

- 1972 - VOEST Bridge built.
- 1974 - Brucknerhaus assembly hall opens.
- 1975 - Johannes Kepler University Linz active.
- 1979 - Ars Electronica festival begins.
- 1985 - Neues Rathaus (Linz) (city hall) built.
- 1986 - Donauhalle ice rink opens.
- 1988 - Franz Dobusch becomes mayor.
- 1994 - Honorary Consulate of the Czech Republic opened.
- 2000 - Linz AG established.

== 21st century ==
- 2001 - Memorial at the former Linz II subcamp of the Mauthausen concentration camp erected.
- 2003 - Lentos Art Museum opens.
- 2004 - Linz Hauptbahnhof (train station) rebuilt.
- 2010 - City co-hosts the 2010 European Men's Handball Championship.
- 2013 - Klaus Luger becomes mayor.
- 2014 - Honorary Consulate of Poland opened.
- 2016
  - City hosts the 2016 World Karate Championships.
  - Population: 200,843.

== See also ==
- Linz history (de)
- List of mayors of Linz
- Kastell Lentia, Roman-era fortress
- Archiv der Stadt Linz (city archives)
- Timelines of other cities in Austria: Graz, Salzburg, Vienna

== Bibliography ==
=== in English ===
- "Linz". Chambers's Encyclopaedia. London. 1901. hdl:2027/hvd.hn52jv.
- "Linz" . Encyclopædia Britannica. Vol. 16 (11th ed.). 1910. p. 737.
- "Linz", Austria-Hungary (11th ed.), Leipzig: Karl Baedeker, 1911 + 1871 ed.
- Evan B. Bukey (1978), "The Nazi Party in Linz, 1939: A Sociological Perspective", German Studies Review, vol. 1
- Evan B. Bukey (1983), "Hitler's Hometown under Nazi Rule: Linz, Austria, 1938-45", Central European History, 16 (2): 171–186, doi:10.1017/S0008938900013285, JSTOR 4545983, S2CID 145742746
- Amelia Carr (2001). "Linz". In John M. Jeep (ed.). Medieval Germany: an Encyclopedia. Garland Publishing. p. 455. ISBN 0-8240-7644-3.

=== in German ===
- Benedikt Pillwein (1824). Beschriebung der Provinzial-Hauptstadt Linz und ihrer nächsten Umgebung (in German).
- Gottlob Heinrich Heinse (1838). Linz und seine Umgebungen (in German) (2nd ed.). 1812 ed.
- "Linz". Brockhaus' Konversations-Lexikon (in German). Vol. 11 (14th ed.). Leipzig: Brockhaus. 1896. hdl:2027/njp.32101064064551.
- Konrad Schiffmann (1905). "Baugeschichte des Linzer Theaters". Drama und Theater in Österreich ob der Enns bis zum Jahre 1803 (in German). Verlag des Vereines Museum Francisco-Carolinum. pp. 86–97.
- Karl Schwager (1971), "Geschichte der Juden in Linz", in Hugo Gold (ed.), Geschichte der Juden in Osterreich: Ein Gedenkbuch (in German), Tel Aviv, OCLC 425299
- Otto Ruhsam, ed. (1989). Historische Bibliographie der Stadt Linz (in German). Archiv der Stadt Linz. ISBN 3900388709.
- Fritz Mayrhofer; Willibald Katzinger (1990). Geschichte der Stadt Linz (in German). ISBN 3853581005.
