= Schloss Obermurau =

Austrian castle located in Sytria

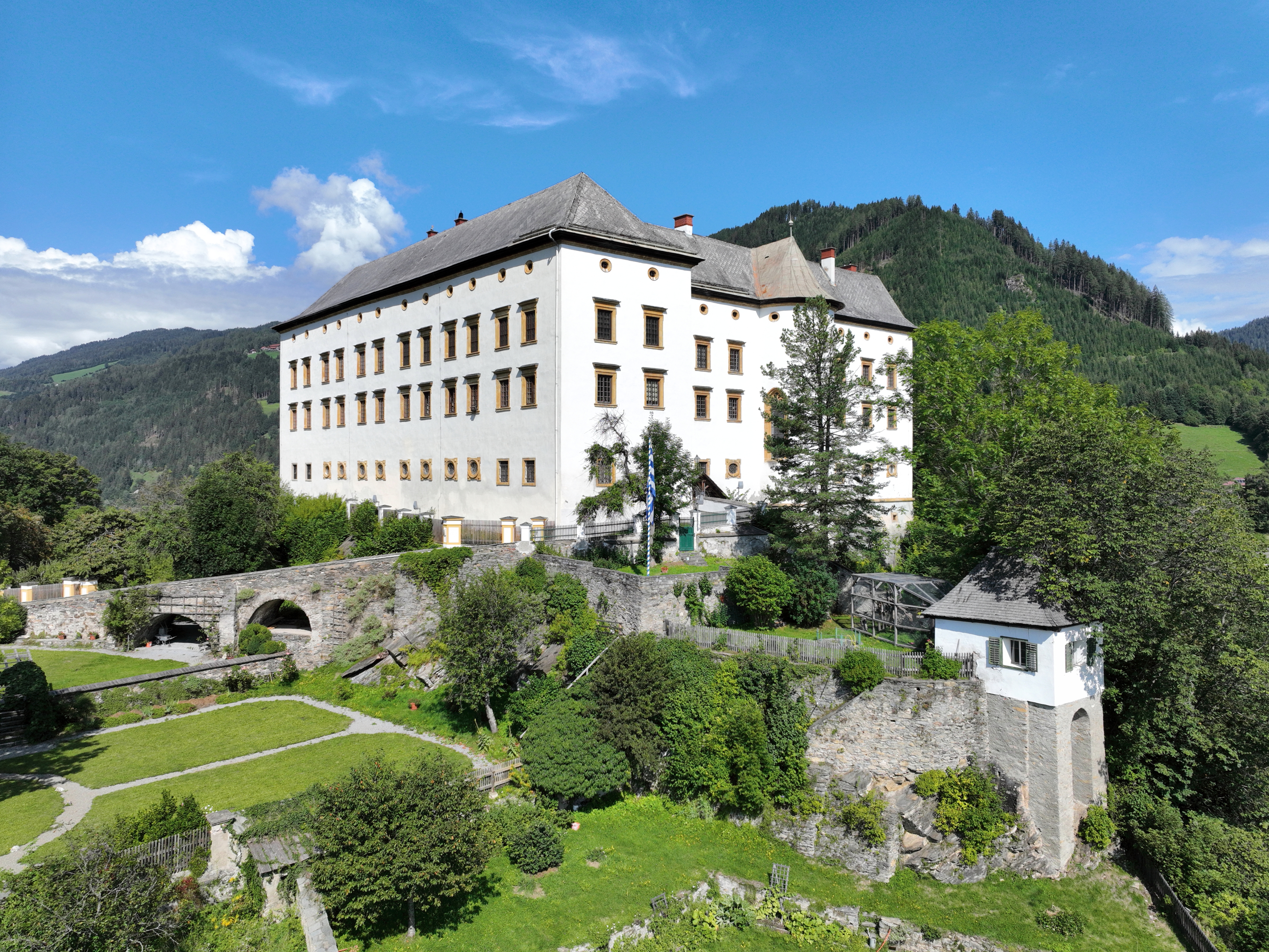
- Schloss Obermurau

General information
- Status: Completed
- Type: Hill castle
- Location: Murau, Schloßberg 1, 8850 Murau, Austria, Austria
- Coordinates: 47°6′42.64″N 14°10′9.24″E
- Construction started: 1232 (794 years ago)
- Owner: Schwarzenberg family

Website
- https://www.murau.gv.at/schloss-murau.html

Schloss Obermurau (also referred to as Schloss Murau) is a Renaissance castle located on the Schlossberg hill above the town of Murau in the Austrian state of Styria. The site has been associated with fortifications since the 13th century and has served as a seat of power for various noble families, most notably the Schwarzenberg family, who continue to own the castle today. The current structure, completed in the mid-17th century, is a four-winged Renaissance palace with Baroque interior features.

== History ==
The origins of the castle date back to around 1232, when a fortress was constructed by Ulrich von Liechtenstein, a prominent Styrian noble and minnesinger. This early structure was destroyed during the conflict between King Ottokar II of Bohemia and the Habsburgs (1276–1278), but was subsequently rebuilt by Ulrich's son, Otto von Liechtenstein.

In 1580, the last male heir of the Liechtenstein-Murau line, Christoph von Liechtenstein, died. His widow, Anna Neumann von Wasserleonburg, inherited the estate. In 1617, she married Georg Ludwig von Schwarzenberg, who was considerably younger. Following her death in 1623, Georg Ludwig commissioned the demolition of the old medieval castle and initiated construction of a new Renaissance residence. This new structure was completed between 1628 and 1643, forming the core of the present Schloss Obermurau.

The Schwarzenberg family, elevated to princely status in 1670, retained ownership of the castle, which has remained in their possession ever since.

== Architecture ==
Schloss Obermurau is a three-story, four-winged complex arranged around a rectangular courtyard. Its design reflects Renaissance principles with later Baroque influences. Notable architectural features include arcaded inner courtyards, a chapel dedicated to St. Achatius, and richly decorated interiors.

Interior elements include stucco work attributed to the Italian artist Giuseppe Pazarino (c. 1640), 17th-century altarpieces, wooden coffered ceilings, and tiled stoves dating to the late 16th and early 17th centuries. The Rittersaal (Knights' Hall) and Katzensaal (Cat Hall) are among the most notable rooms, featuring original furnishings, historical tapestries, and elaborate woodwork.

== See also ==
- List of castles in Austria
- Styria
- House of Schwarzenberg
- House of Lichtenstein
- House of Habsburg

== Gallery ==
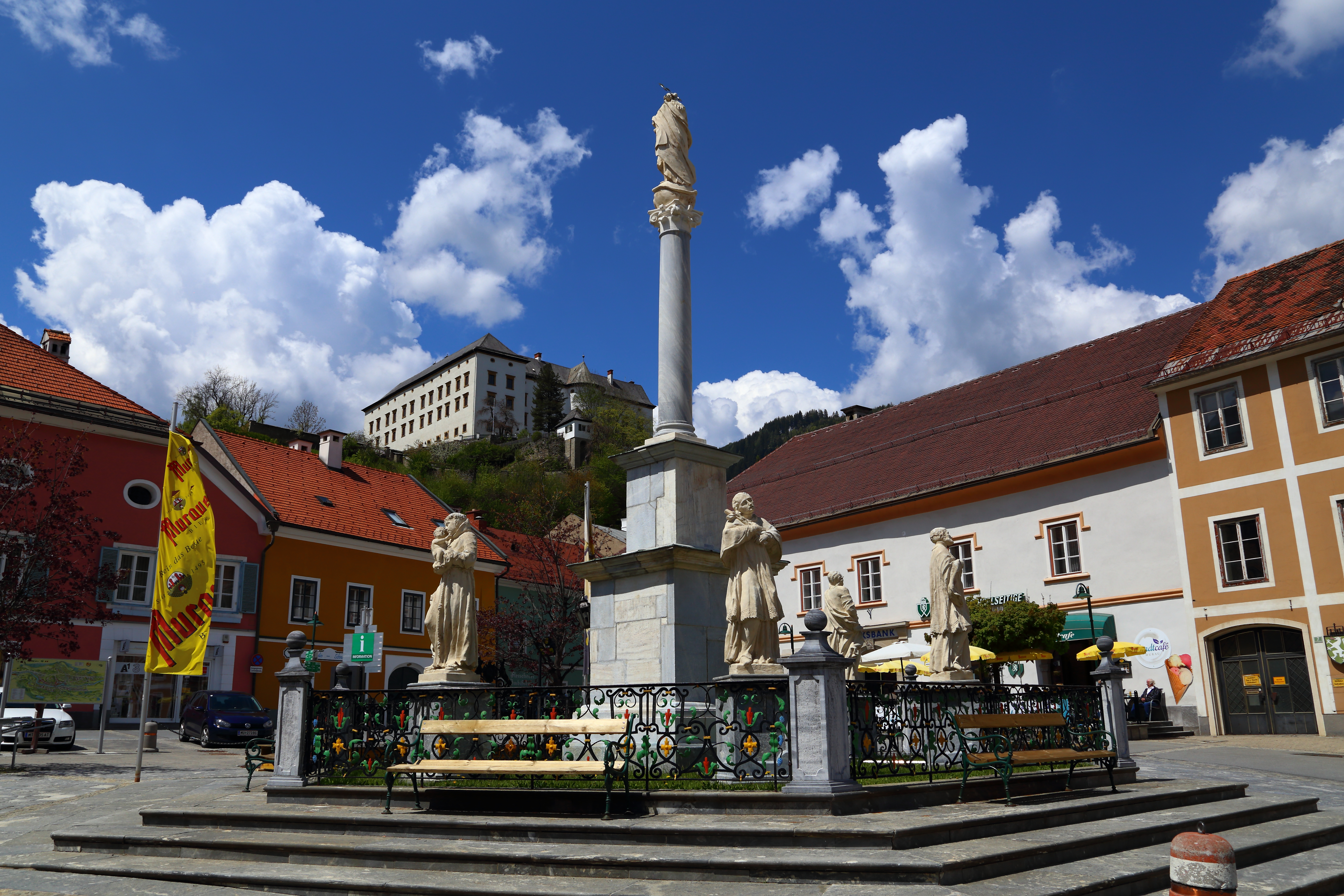
City View

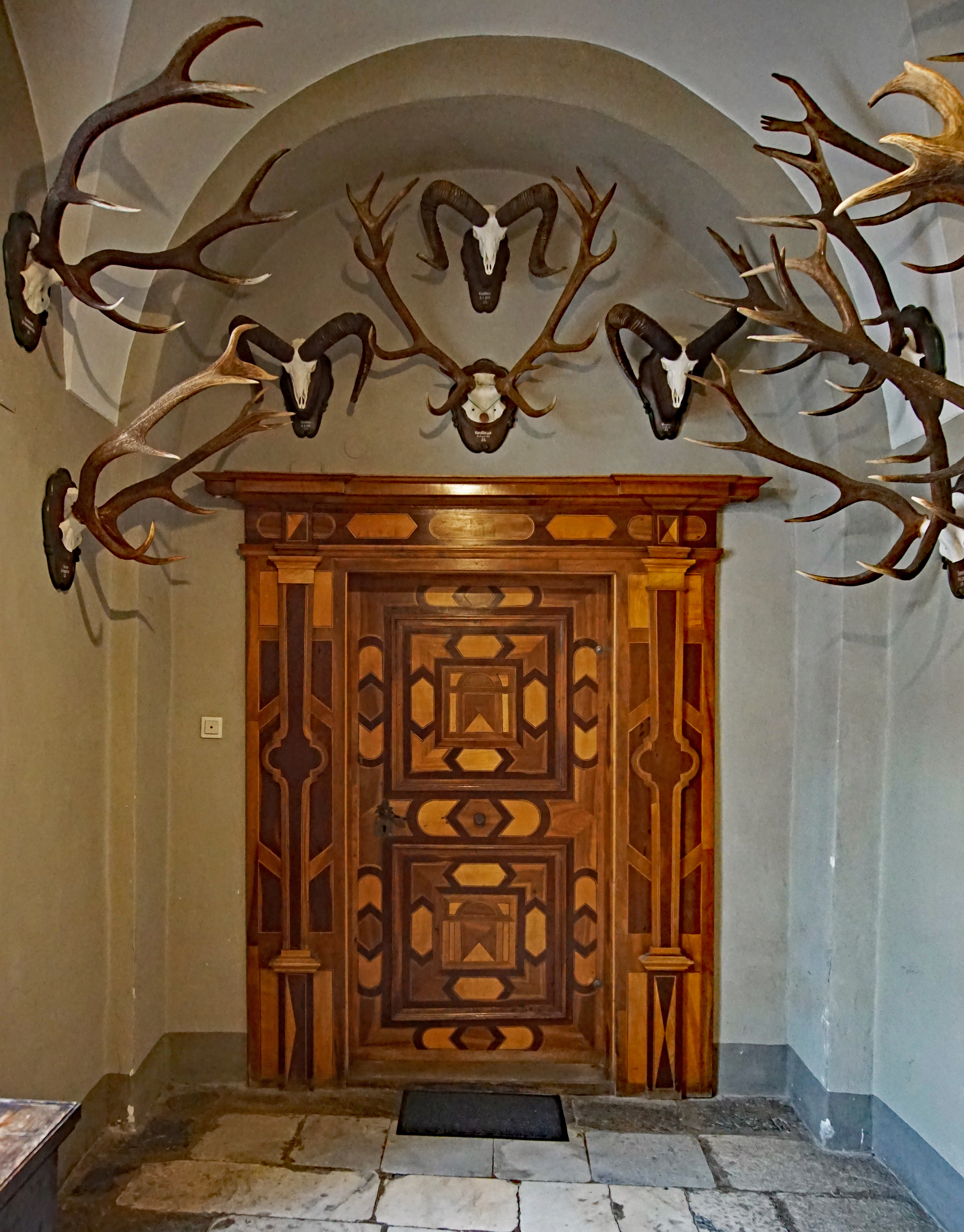
Inside View

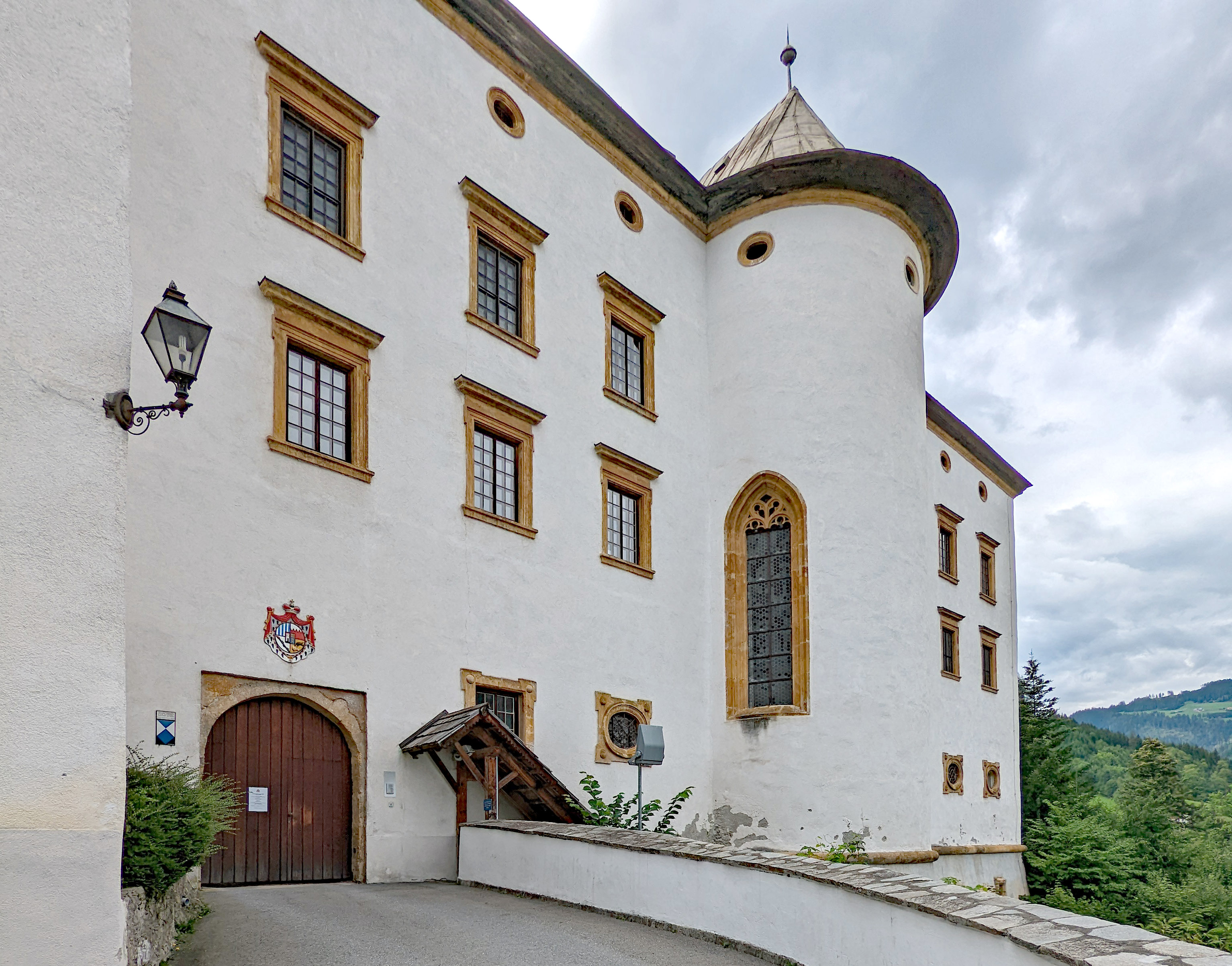
Entry View
