= Fairytale Express Graz =

Railway line in Austria

Coordinates: 47.073911°N 15.437594°E

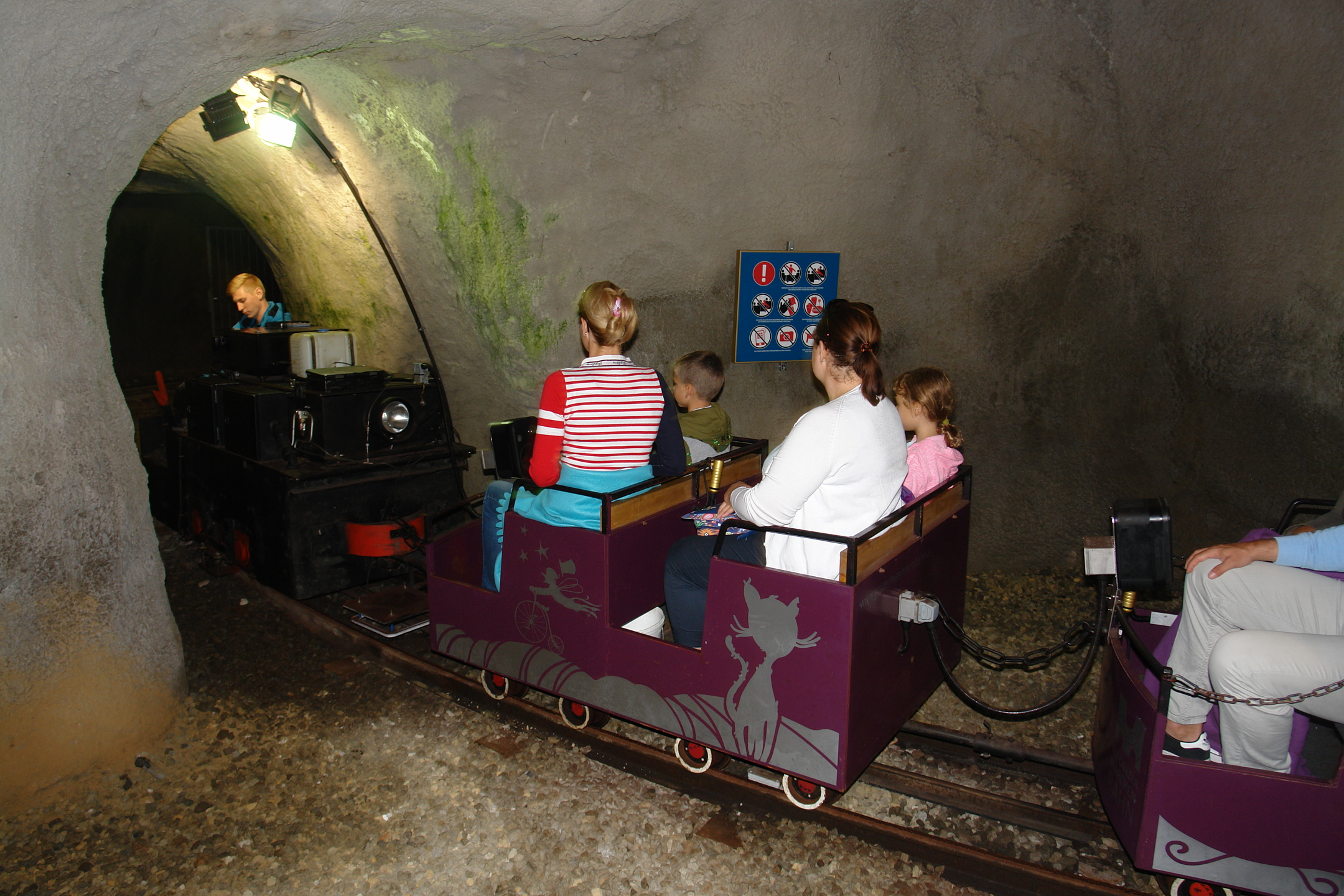
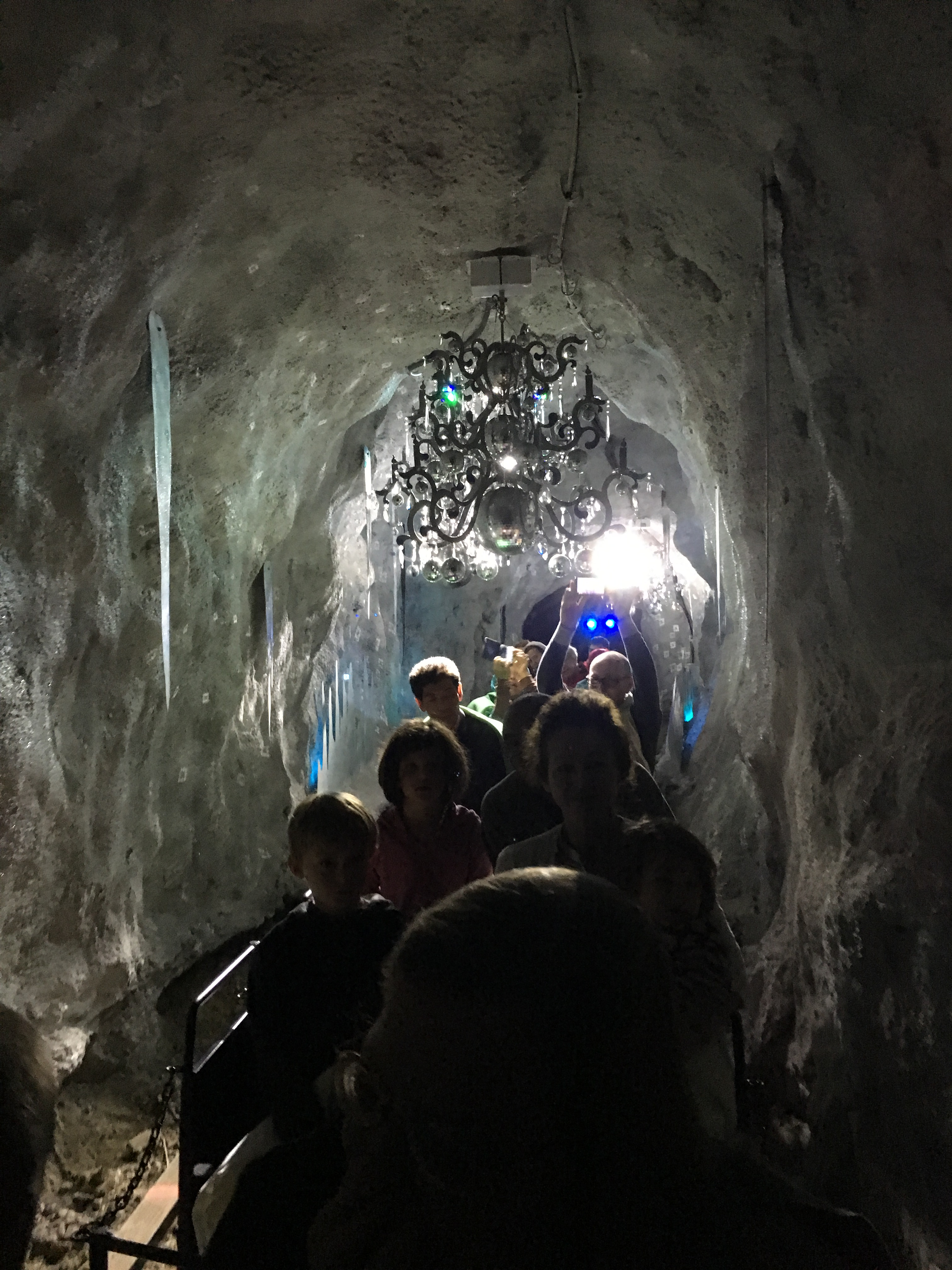
- Fairy Tale Express Graz Fairy Tale Express Graz

Technical
- Line length: 2 km (1.2 mi)
- Track gauge: 600 mm (1 ft 11 5/8 in)

The Fairytale Express Graz is a 2 km (1.2 mi) long 600 mm (1 ft 11 5/8 in) gauge grotto railway in the tunnel of the Schloßberg (castle hill) in Graz. It starts in the tunnel at the lower level of the Schloßberg lift, which is accessible from Schloßbergplatz.

== History ==
During the World War II, the tunnels of the Schloßberg, built in 1937, served as a haven from air raids for 40,000 people from 1943 onwards. The extensive 6.3 km (3.9 mi) long tunnel system with 20 entrances offered protection to the inhabitants of the city.

In the post-war period, the air raid tunnels were initially no longer used, until the first Fairytale Grotto Railway was established in 1968 in a section of the tunnel system, which was accessible via an entrance in the Wickenburggasse. Ten years later, the business was temporarily closed-down, and the Fairytale Grotto Railway was out of service for four years.

The railway was reopened in 1982. From 1984, the passable track was extended and the entrance relocated to the Schloßbergplatz. The necessary construction work was supported by the private Mining and Railway Museum, which stores its heritage rail vehicles in the tunnels since 1984 but is not yet accessible for the general public. The train operation was converted to electricity and the gallery walls were secured with shotcrete.

At that time, many plastic dolls were displayed in the tunnels of the castle hill, which represented 34 fairytales such as Snow White. The trip took at that time about 20 to 25 minutes on the 2 km (1.2 mi) long track with 600 mm (1 ft 11 5/8 in) gauge. DC-powered electric locomotives like the locomotive Heinz 1 hauled trains with ten cars built in 1968 at a speed of 4 kilometres per hour (2.5 mph) on a track with eight points. Up to 20 passengers could ride in the old Fairytale Grotto Railway. In 1997, the worn tracks were completely renewed during the construction of the Schloßberglift and the venue Dom im Berg, with a track change from 500 to 600 mm gauge. In 1999, the railway was reopened, but was closed in 2000 due to the tightened safety regulations after the fire of the Kaprun disaster and taken over by the city of Graz. After implementing extensive health and safety features, the railway resumed operation at the end of 2011.

From early 2012 to November 2014, the fairy tale grotto railway was redesigned. The required renovation of the tunnel and the train was partially required, because of the amended legal provisions, which were much more complex than originally expected. Two thirds of the costs of 1.6 million Euros were spent on the renovation of the mining tunnel. The Graz Children's Museum FRida & freD was commissioned to redesign the content. On 14 November 2014, it was officially opened under the new name Grazer Märchenbahn (Fairy Tale Express Graz).

== Route ==
Each of the two electrically driven trains passes a total of 22 stations and stops at 10 of these, so that the passengers can illuminate the exhibits with their flashlights during the approximately 35-minute journey:

- Otherworld (short stopover)
- Horse-drawn carriage
- Old witch's land (short stopover)
- Meadow of flowers
- Giant feet (short stopover)
- Autumn
- Fairy tale forest (interactive stop)
- Robber's cave
- Treasure cave (interactive stop)
- Flight
- Oriental wye (interactive stop and reversal point)
- Thunderstorms
- Water
- Ice world (interactive stop)
- Stones - Metamorphosis (interactive stop)
- Mirror
- Spring (passing loop)
- Food
- Thorn hedge (interactive stop)
- Headgear
- Guard
- Ballroom (interactive stop)

== Exhibition concept ==
The modern concept of the Fairy Tale Express Graz intends to offer both children from 4 years and above as well as adults an equally impressive experience, instead of presenting the fairy tale contents just by animated dolls as in earlier years.

The fairy tale world was carefully staged, whereby the figures and fairy tale contents are not explicitly represented. The collage of light and darkness, drive and standstill as well as the stimulating comments and fairy tale quotes allow a variety of associations in the coolness of the dark tunnel, leaving as much freedom as possible to the passengers' imagination.

The train ride runs through some very dark tunnels, in which both young children and claustrophobic grown-ups could get scared. The temperature inside the tunnel is approximately 8–12 °C all year round, which requires appropriate clothing.
