= Franz Langoth =

Austrian nationalist politician

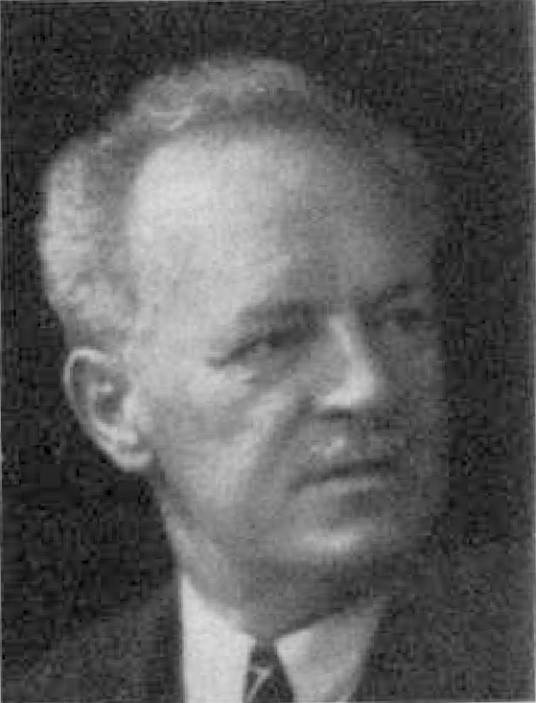
- Langoth, c. 1938
- Born: Franz Langoth; 20 August 1877; Linz, Austria-Hungary
- Died: 17 April 1953 (aged 75); Linz, Austria
- Citizenship: Austrian, German (1938–1945)
- Known for: Politician and administrator
- Notable work: Kampf um Österreich (1951)
- Title: Mayor of Linz
- Term: 1944-1945
- Predecessor: Leopold Sturma
- Successor: Ernst Koref
- Political party: Greater German People's Party; Nazi Party

Franz Langoth (20 August 1877 – 17 April 1953) was an Austrian nationalist politician who later became a leading figure in the country's Nazi movement. He was a judge on the People's Court, an SS-Brigadeführer and the mayor of Linz. Though interned by the Allies at the end of the Second World War, he faced no charges in denazification proceedings.

== Nationalist politics ==
A native of Linz, Langoth was the son of a miller and a flour merchant and qualified as a teacher in 1896. He began his political career as a nationalist member of the Landtag of Upper Austria in 1909. He served in the Austro-Hungarian Army during the First World War and subsequently with the Landsturm as a Leutnant.

In the immediate aftermath of the war, Langoth became head of the provincial security committee in Linz and, although he became noted for his hard-line völkisch beliefs and his strong support for Anschluss, he also worked closely with Johann Nepomuk Hauser, the governor of Upper Austria who was noted for his Christian socialist beliefs. As deputy Landeshauptmann Langoth gained a reputation as a strong, albeit even-handed, upholder of law and order in the province. In particular, Langoth clashed regularly with Emil Fey, particularly as he had banned marches by the Heimwehr in Upper Austria. Langoth's reputation as law enforcer even saw Engelbert Dollfuss offer him the post of Federal Minister of Public Security in May 1932 but the offer was rejected.

Langoth became leader of the Greater German People's Party after the First World War, leading the party on a strongly antisemitic and racist course. However, whilst the party initially enjoyed a following it soon lost out to the Nazi Party and Langoth joined this group in 1933. He also joined the Schutzstaffel at the same time. Under the Ständestaat Langoth established the Hilfswerk Langoth which provided welfare payments to Nazi activists and played an important role in ensuring the continuation of the Nazi movement. Although the Nazi Party was banned in Austria after the attempted July Putsch of 1934, Kurt Schuschnigg allowed Langoth's group to be active due to his high standing. Langoth, along with Ernst Kaltenbrunner and Anton Reinthaller, even met with Schuschnigg in 1935 in an attempt to get the ban on the Nazis lifted in return for a guarantee of co-operation with the regime.

== Under the Nazis ==
Langoth was a strong supporter of the Anschluss and he argued that "the election on 10 April 1938 in Austria had been an example of a true, democratic plebiscite and would be recorded as a pure and clean vote in future history". At the 10 April 1938 parliamentary election, he was elected to the Reichstag as a deputy from Ostmark and retained this seat until the fall of the Nazi regime. Langoth became head of the Nationalsozialistische Volkswohlfahrt for Austria and the upper Danube area. He also served as a judge in the Volksgerichtshof where he passed 41 death sentences. He also obtained the rank of SS-Brigadeführer. Towards the end of the Second World War he also served as Mayor of Linz and, as the Allies advanced, Langoth sought out the Austrian resistance and negotiated with them the transfer of Linz to their administration.

== Post-war activities ==
Langoth was arrested by the United States forces and interned at Glasenbach until 1947, although he surprisingly faced no charges under the denazification process and was amnestied by the Austrian government in 1950. He became an advisor to the founders of the Federation of Independents and was an honorary member of the party. His 1951 autobiography Kampf um Österreich was characterised by its continuing support for Nazism.

=== Street naming controversy ===
In the post-war era Langoth was for some time considered a 'good' Nazi who bore no responsibility for the excesses of the regime, to the extent that in 1972 a street in Linz was renamed Langothstraße. The name continued in use until 1986 when the street was restored to its original name of Kaisergasse.

== Literature ==
- Die Gemeindevertretung der Stadt Linz vom Jahre 1848 bis zur Gegenwart. Geschichte – Biographien. Druck- und Verlags-Anstalt Gutenberg, Linz 1968, p. 189 f.
- Graf, Wolfgang: Österreichische SS-Generäle. Himmlers verlässliche Vasallen. Hermagoras-Verlag, Klagenfurt u. a. 2012, ISBN 978-3-7086-0578-4.
- Georg Grüll: Das Linzer Bürgermeisterbuch. Städtische Sammlungen der Stadt Linz, Linz 1953.
- Schuster, Walter: Deutschnational, nationalsozialistisch, entnazifiziert. Franz Langoth, eine NS-Laufbahn. Archiv der Stadt Linz, Linz 1999, ISBN 3-900388-79-2.
