= Timeline of Salzburg =

The following is a timeline of the history of the city of Salzburg, Austria.

== Prior to 18th century ==
- 696 - St Peter's Abbey, Salzburg founded.
- 739 - Roman Catholic diocese of Salzburg established.
- 774 - Cathedral built.
- 798 - made an archbishopric.
- 1077 - Hohensalzburg Castle construction begins.
- 1167 - Fire accident on 4 April.
- 1287 - City rights granted.
- 1350 - Bürgerspitalkirche St. Blasius (church) built.
- 1370 - Konrad Taufkind becomes mayor.
- 1492 - Stieglbrauerei zu Salzburg (brewery) established.
- 1498 - Jews expelled from Salzburg.
- 1512 - Sebastianskirche (Salzburg) (church) built.
- 1519 - Hohensalzburg Castle expanded.
- 1523 - Rathaus Salzburg (town hall) built.
- 1525 - German Peasants' War.
- 1587 - Wolf Dietrich Raitenau becomes prince-archbishop.
- 1588 - Neue Residenz (Salzburg) construction begins on the Residenzplatz.
- 1606 - Schloss Altenau built.
- 1619 - Hellbrunn Palace built near Salzburg.
- 1623 - Paris Lodron University opens.
- 1652 - Universitätsbibliothek Salzburg (library) founded.
- 1668 - Cathedral rebuilt.
- 1674 - Maria Plain church consecrated near Salzburg.
- 1689 - Erhardkirche (Salzburg) (church) rebuilt.
- 1697 - Chiemseehof (palace) rebuilt.

== 18th-19th centuries ==
- 1702 - Holy Trinity Church, Salzburg built.
- 1707 - Kollegienkirche, Salzburg (church) built.
- 1711 - Kajetanerkirche (church) built.
- 1731 - Protestants expelled from Salzburg.
- 1756 - The birth of future composer Mozart at no.9 Getreidegasse.
- 1767 - Sigmundstor (Salzburg) (tunnel) built through the Mönchsberg.
- 1805
  - City sacked by French forces.
  - Salzburg becomes part of the Austrian Empire.
- 1809 - Salzburg becomes part of the Kingdom of Bavaria.
- 1816 - Salzburg becomes part of the Austrian Empire again per Treaty of Munich (1816).
- 1818 - Fire.
- 1842 - Mozart Monument installed in the Mozartplatz.
- 1849 - Salzburg becomes seat of the Duchy of Salzburg.
- 1850 - Museum Carolino-Augusteum active.
- 1860 - Salzburg Hauptbahnhof (train station) opens.
- 1880 - Mozarteum Foundation established.

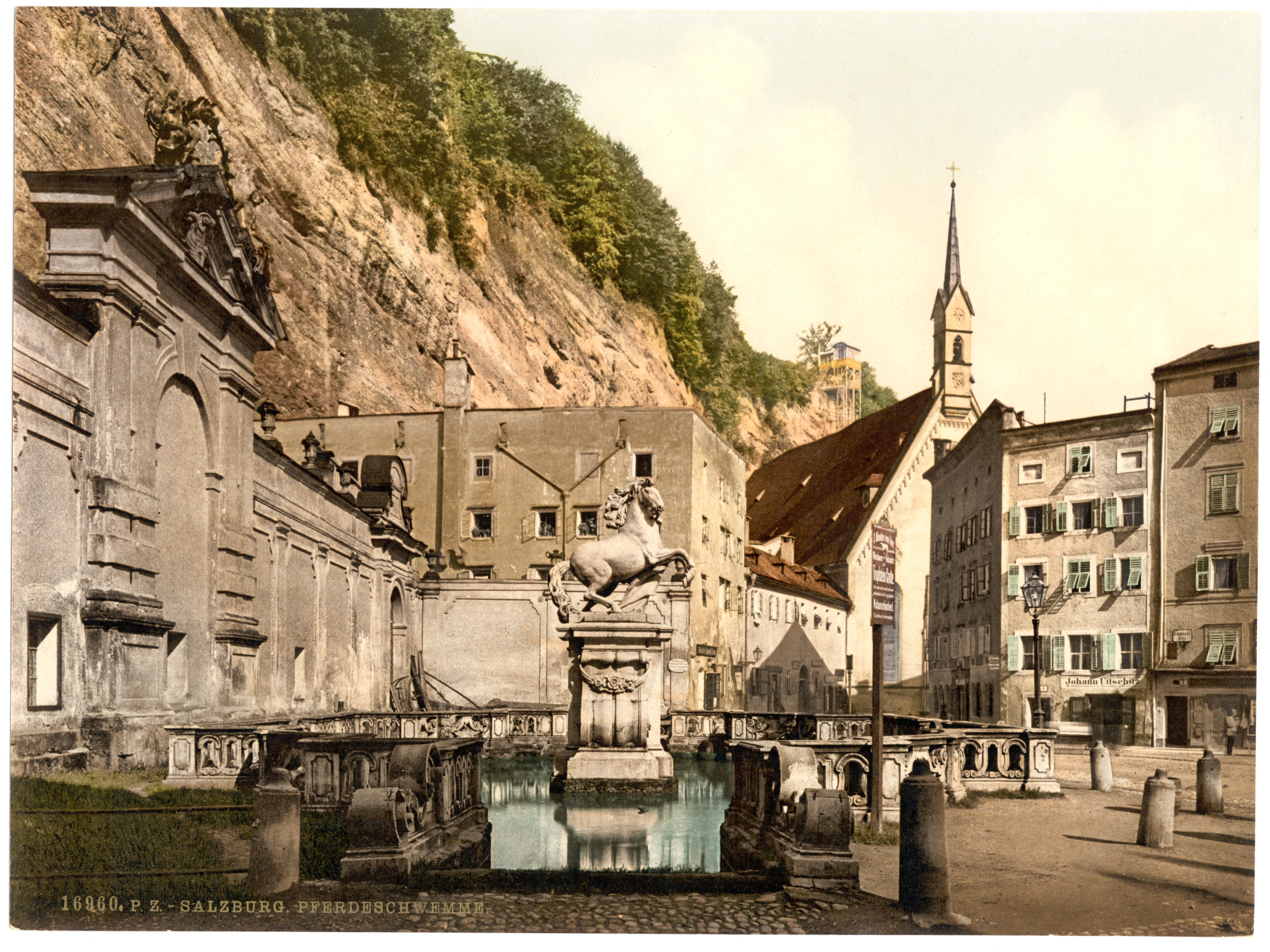
Salzburg in the 1890s

- 1890 - Population: 27,741.

== 20th century ==
- 1901 - Salzburg Synagogue built.
- 1903 - Volksbibliothek (library) opens.
- 1914 - Salzburger AK 1914 football club formed.
- 1918 - Hunger protest.
- 1920
  - Salzburg Festival of theatre and music begins.
  - Population: 36,450.
- 1926 - Kieselgebäude built.
- 1933 - SV Austria Salzburg (football club) formed.
- 1935 - Gnigl and Maxglan become part of city.

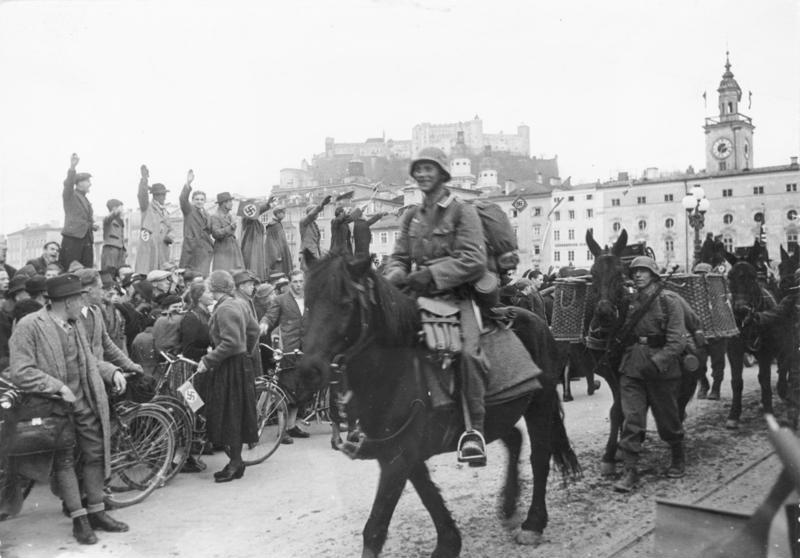
German annexation in 1938

- 1938
  - March: Annexation of Austria into Nazi Germany.
  - Salzburg becomes seat of the Nazi Reichsgau Salzburg (administrative division).
- 1942 - SS Alpenland forced labour subcamp established.
- 1944
  - Bombing of Salzburg in World War II begins.
  - December: Salzburg-Bomb Detection forced labour subcamp established.
- 1945
  - 12 January: Salzburg-Explosives forced labour subcamp established.
  - March: Salzburg-Clearing forced labour subcamp established.
  - Bombing of Salzburg ends.
  - 4 May: American forces take city. Forced labour subcamps dissolved.
- 1951 - Population: 102,927.
- 1956 - Mozart Week established begins.
- 1957 - Alfred Bäck becomes mayor.
- 1960 - Großes Festspielhaus (theatre) opens.
- 1962 - Universität Salzburg active.
- 1971 - Stadion Lehen (stadium) opens.
- 1988 - Salzburg City Archive established.
- 1996 - Altstadt designated an UNESCO World Heritage Site.
- 1999 - Heinz Schaden becomes mayor.

== 21st century ==
- 2016 - Population: 150,938 city; 545,815 state.

== See also ==
- Salzburg history
- History of Salzburg
- List of mayors of Salzburg
- List of bishops of Salzburg
- Iuvavum, Roman-era settlement
- History of Salzburg (state)
- Timelines of other cities in Austria: Graz, Linz, Vienna

== Bibliography ==
in English

- W. Pembroke Fetridge (1881), "Salzburg", Harper's Hand-book for Travellers in Europe and the East, New York: Harper & Brothers
- "Salzburg", Guide through Germany, Austria-Hungary, Switzerland, Italy, France, Belgium, Holland, the United Kingdom, Spain, Portugal, &c (9th ed.), Berlin: J.H. Herz, 1908, OCLC 36795367
- "Salzburg", Encyclopædia Britannica (11th ed.), New York, 1910, OCLC 14782424 – via Internet Archive***Please note that a wikilink to the article on [Salzburg (city)] in [EB1911] is not available***
- "Salzburg", Austria-Hungary (11th ed.), Leipzig: Karl Baedeker, 1911 + 1871 ed.
- Ring, Trudy, ed. (1995). "Salzburg". Northern Europe. International Dictionary of Historic Places. Fitzroy Dearborn. pp. 664+. ISBN 978-1-136-63944-9.
- John M. Jeep, ed. (2001). "Salzburg". Medieval Germany: an Encyclopedia. Garland Publishing. ISBN 0-8240-7644-3.

in German

- F. W. Zillner (1885). Geschichte der Stadt Salzburg (in German).
- J. Meurer (1889). Fuhrer durch Salzburg (in German). Vienna.
- Trautwein (1901). Salzburg (in German). Innsbruck.
- Widmann (1907). Geschichte Salzburgs (in German). Gotha.
- Bayr, Hochland, Salzburg, Salzkammergut. Griebens Reiseführer (in German). 1920.
- Heinz Dopsch [in German]; Robert Hoffmann [in German] (1996). Geschichte der Stadt Salzburg (in German). Universitätsverlag A. Pustet. ISBN 3-7025-0340-4.
- Friederike Zaisberger [in German] (1998). Geschichte Salzburgs (in German). Vienna: Verlag für Geschichte und Politik. ISBN 3-7028-0354-8.
- Dohle, Oskar; Mitterecker, Thomas Josef, eds. (2014). Salzburg im Ersten Weltkrieg: Fernab der Front - dennoch im Krieg (in German). Vienna: Böhlau Verlag. ISBN 978-3-205-79578-0.
