= List of mayors of Linz =

This is a list of mayors (Bürgermeister) of the city of Linz, Austria.

== Austrian Empire ==
- 1821–1848: Joseph Bischoff
- 1848–1854: Reinhold Körner
- 1854–1854: Johann Heinrich Jungwirth
- 1854–1856: Josef Dierzer von Traunthal
- 1856–1861: Vinzenz Fink
- 1861–1867: Reinhold Körner
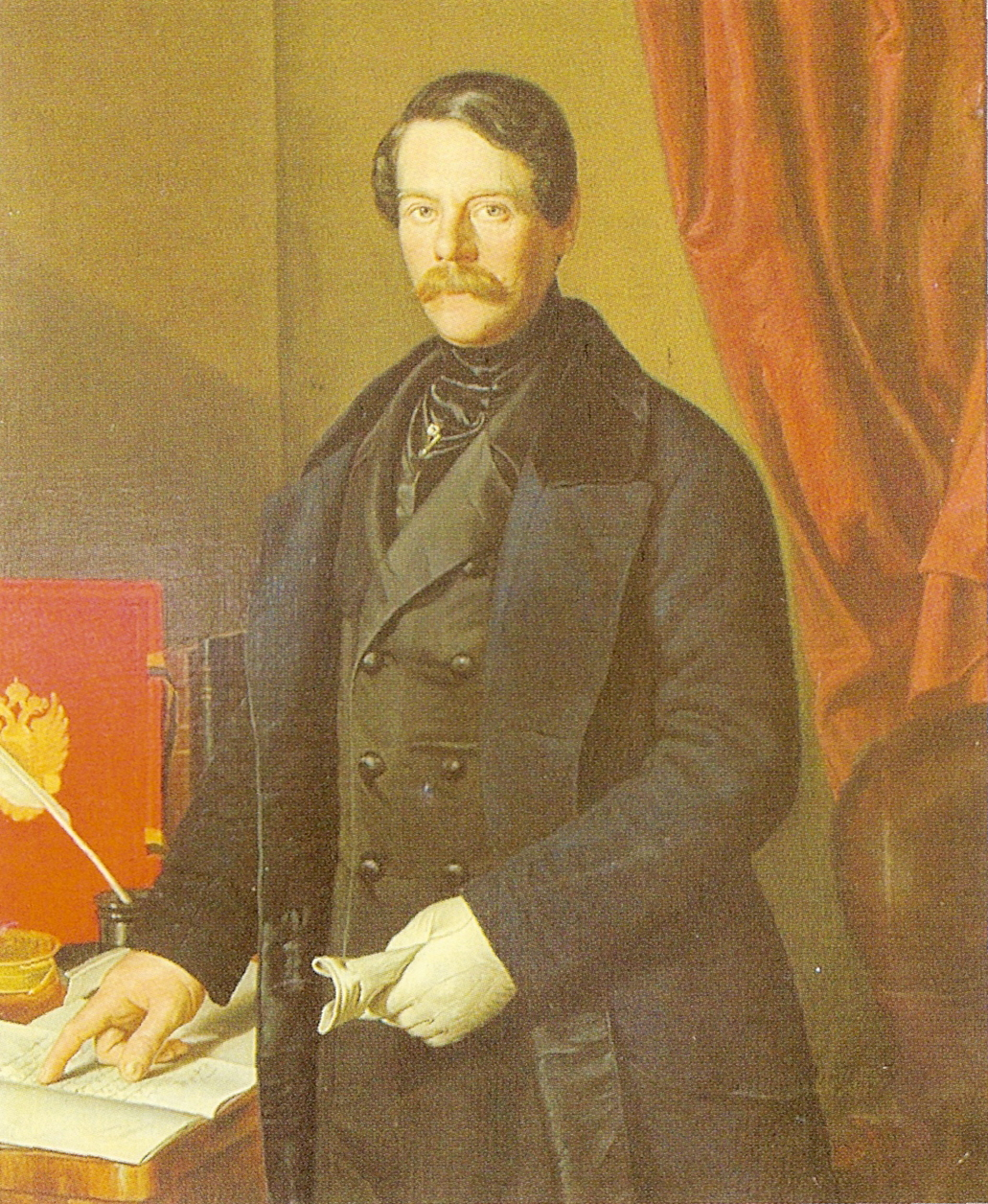
Reinhold Körner

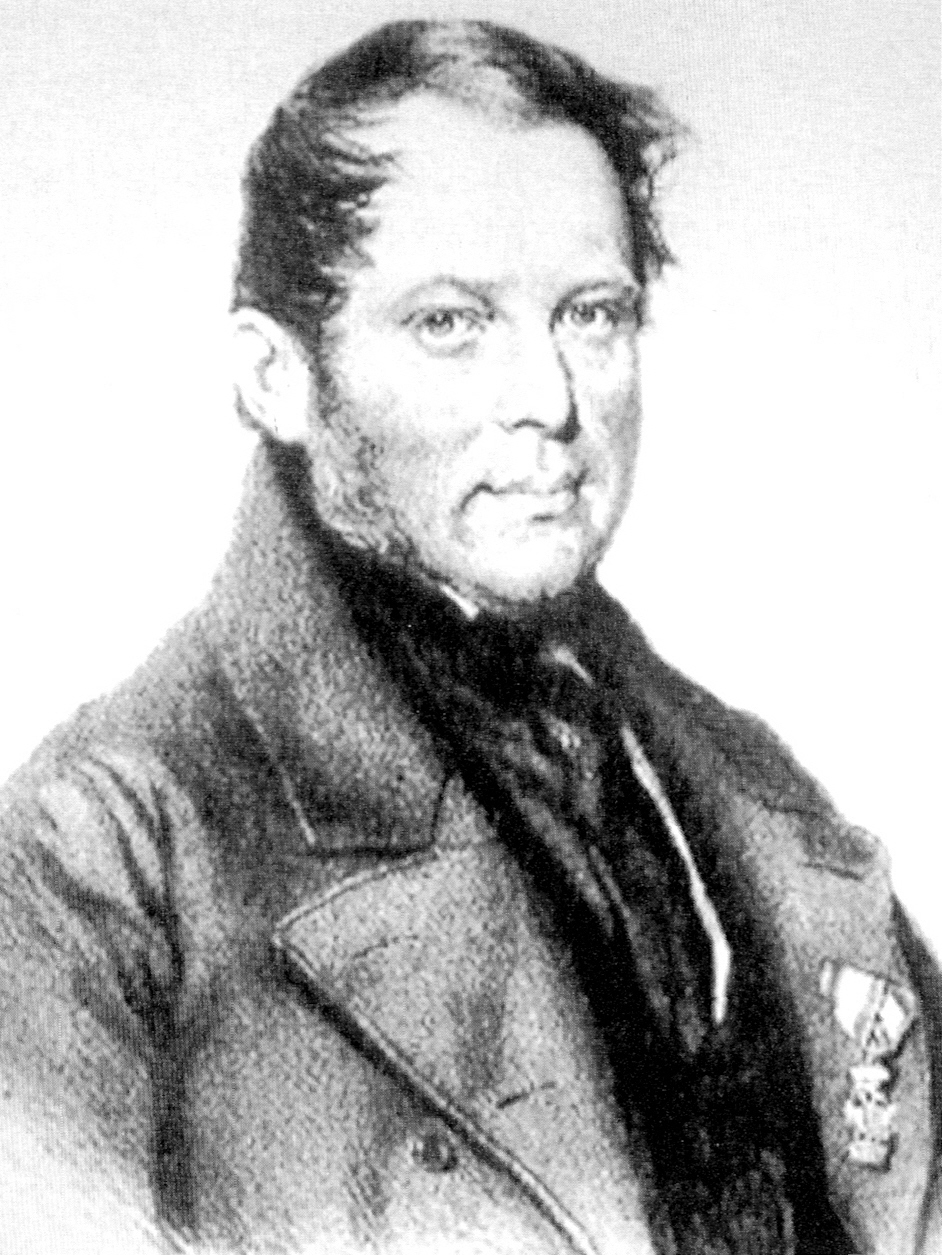
Josef Dierzer von Traunthal

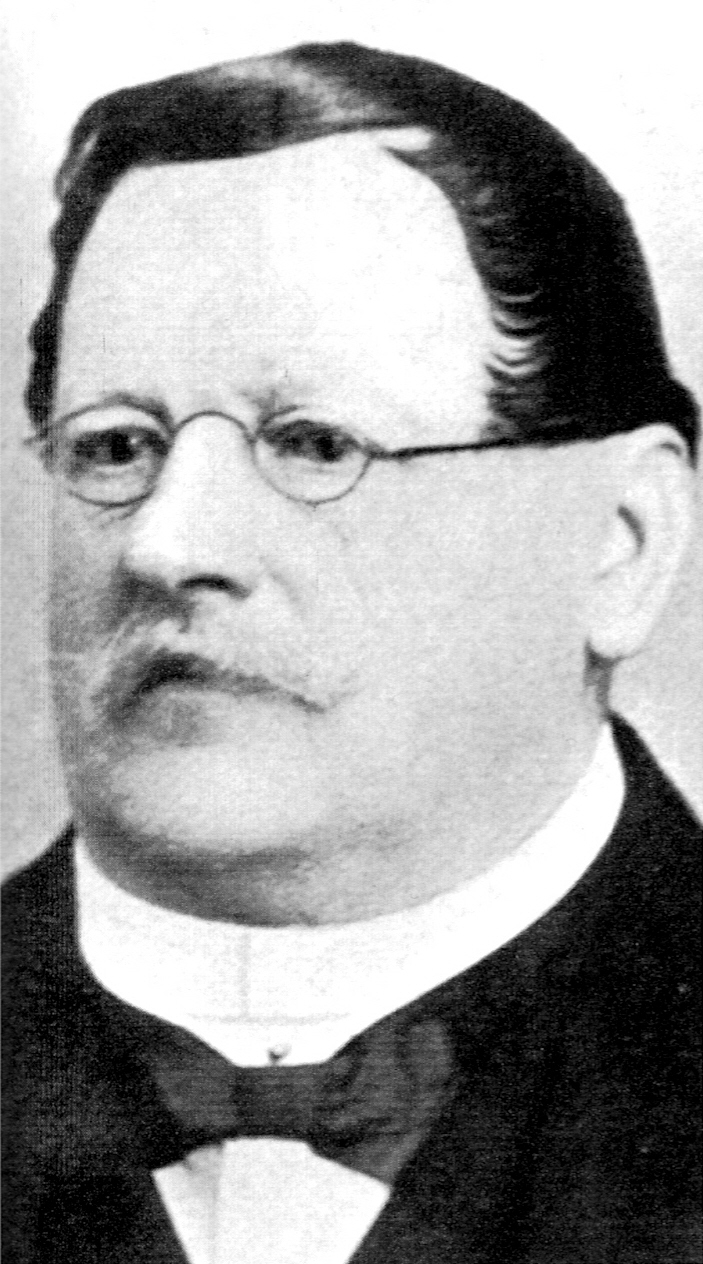
Vinzenz Fink

== Austro-Hungarian Empire ==
- 1867–1873: Viktor Drouot
- 1873–1885: Karl Wiser
- 1885–1894: Johann Evangelist Wimhölzel
- 1894–1900: Franz Poche
- 1900–1907: Gustav Eder
- 1907–1918: Franz Dinghofer
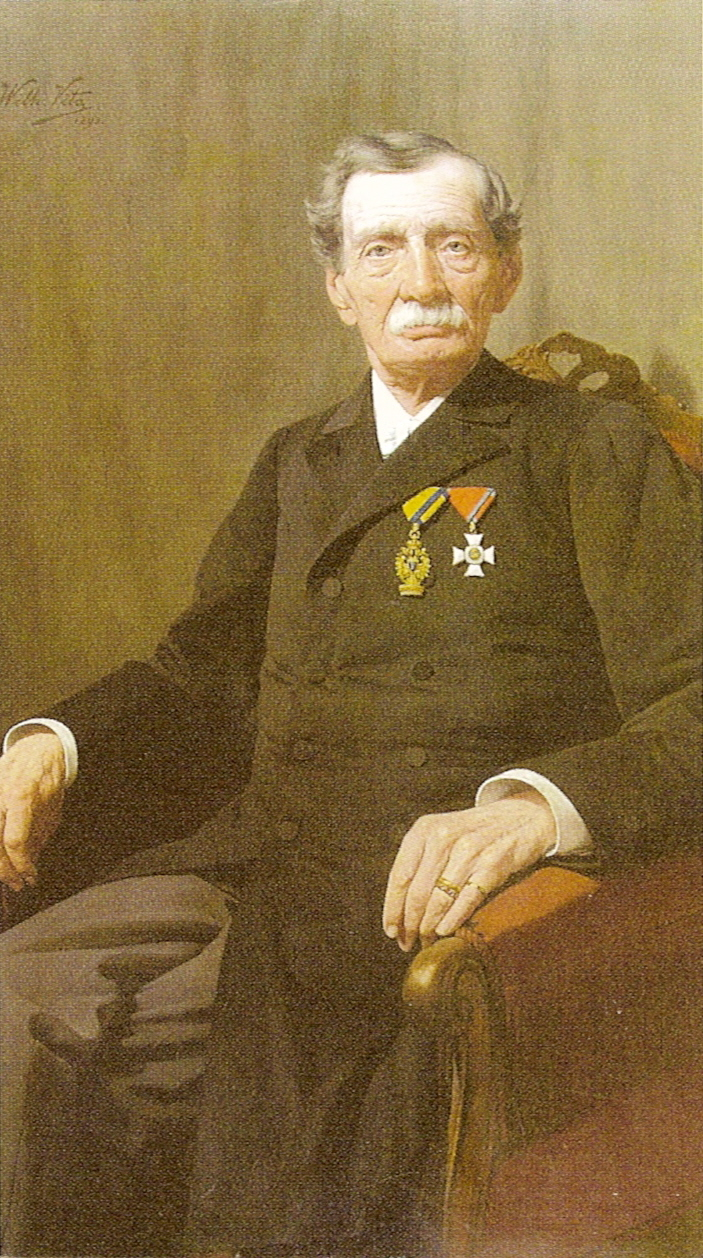
Viktor Drouot

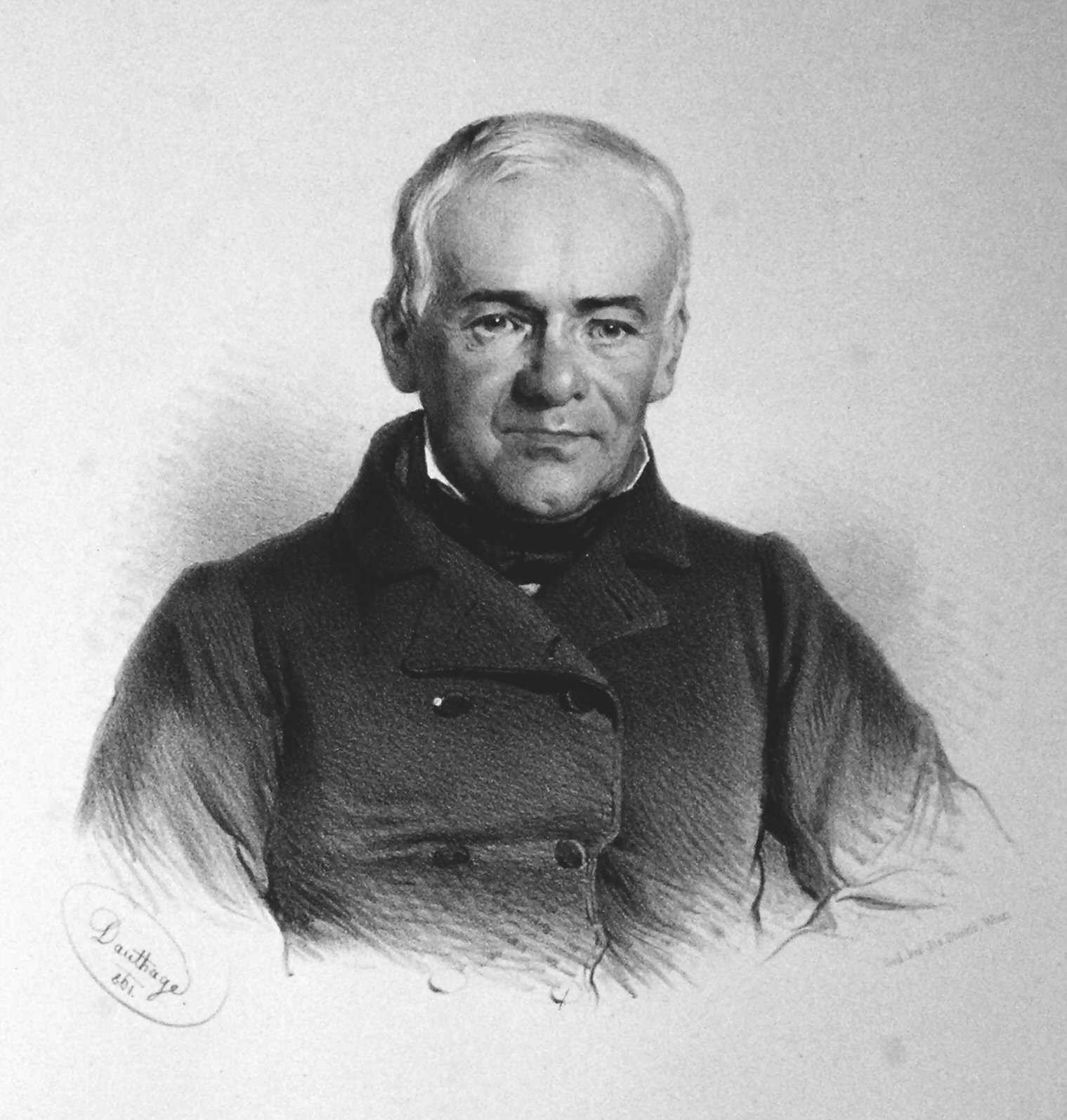
Karl Wiser

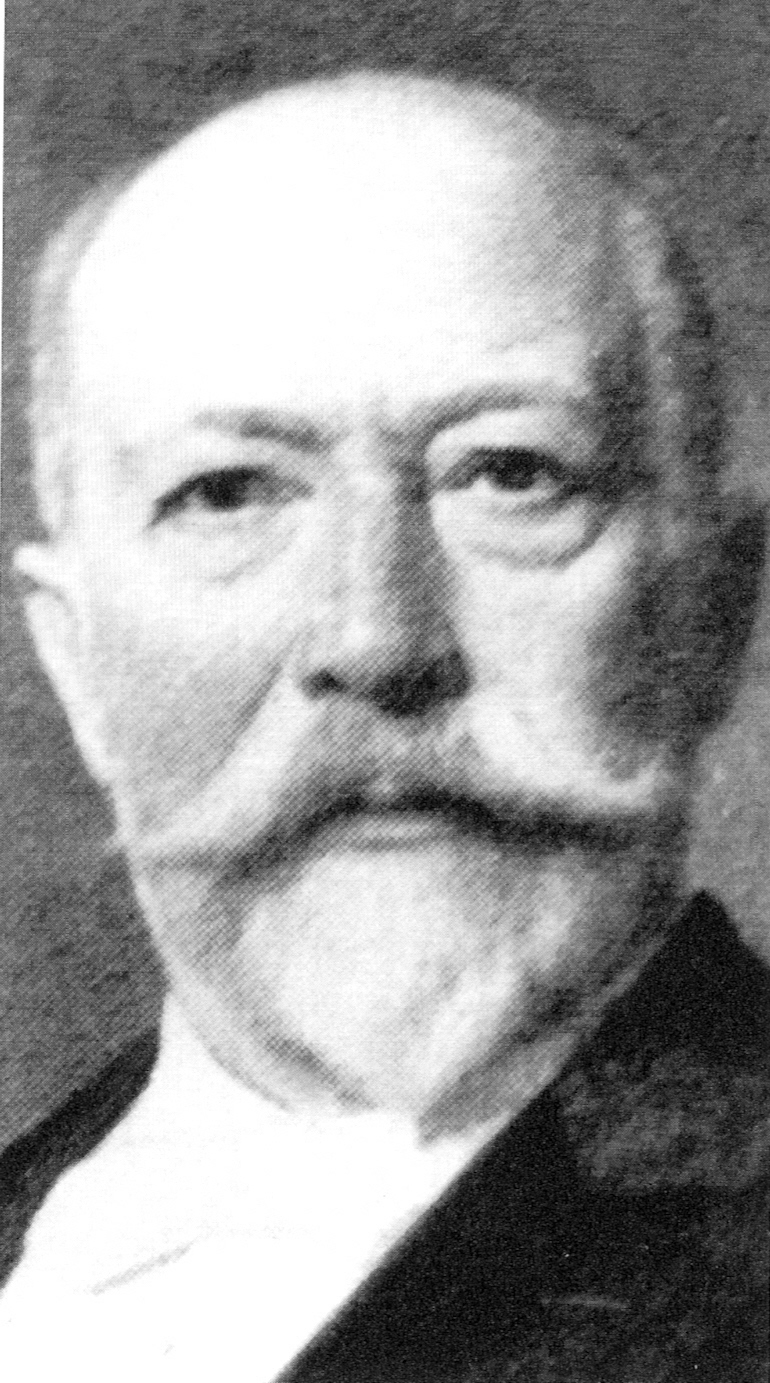
Johann Evangelist Wimhölzel

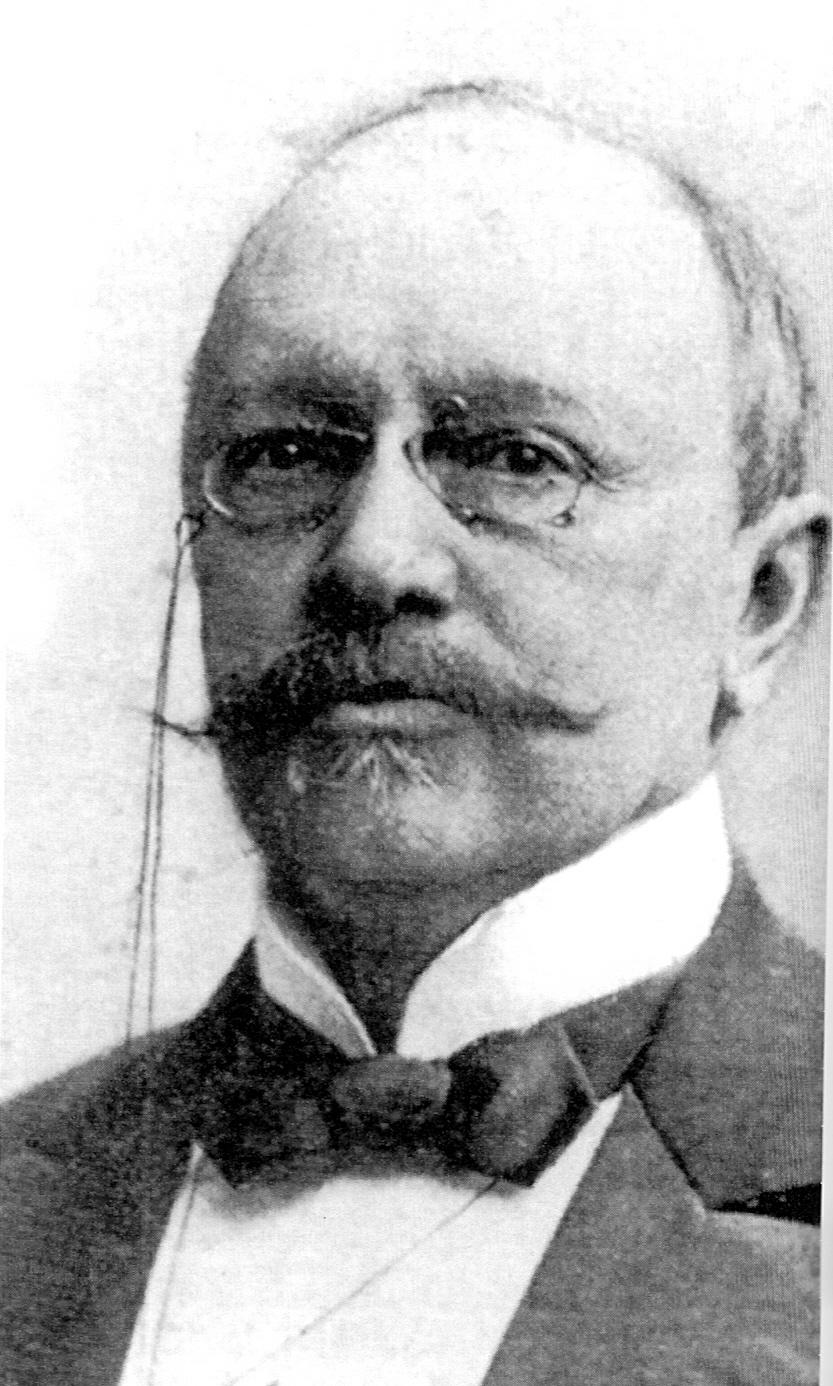
Franz Poche

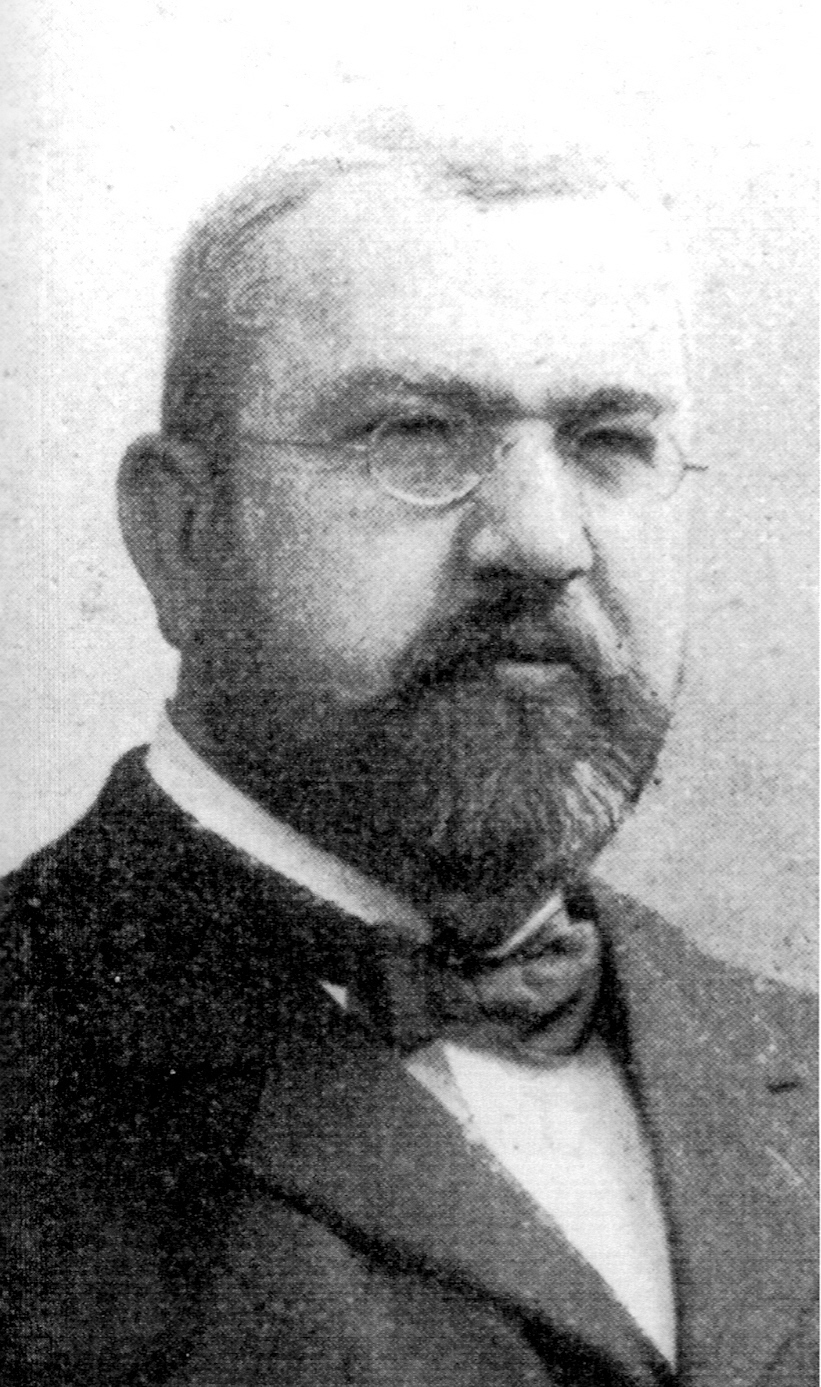
Gustav Eder

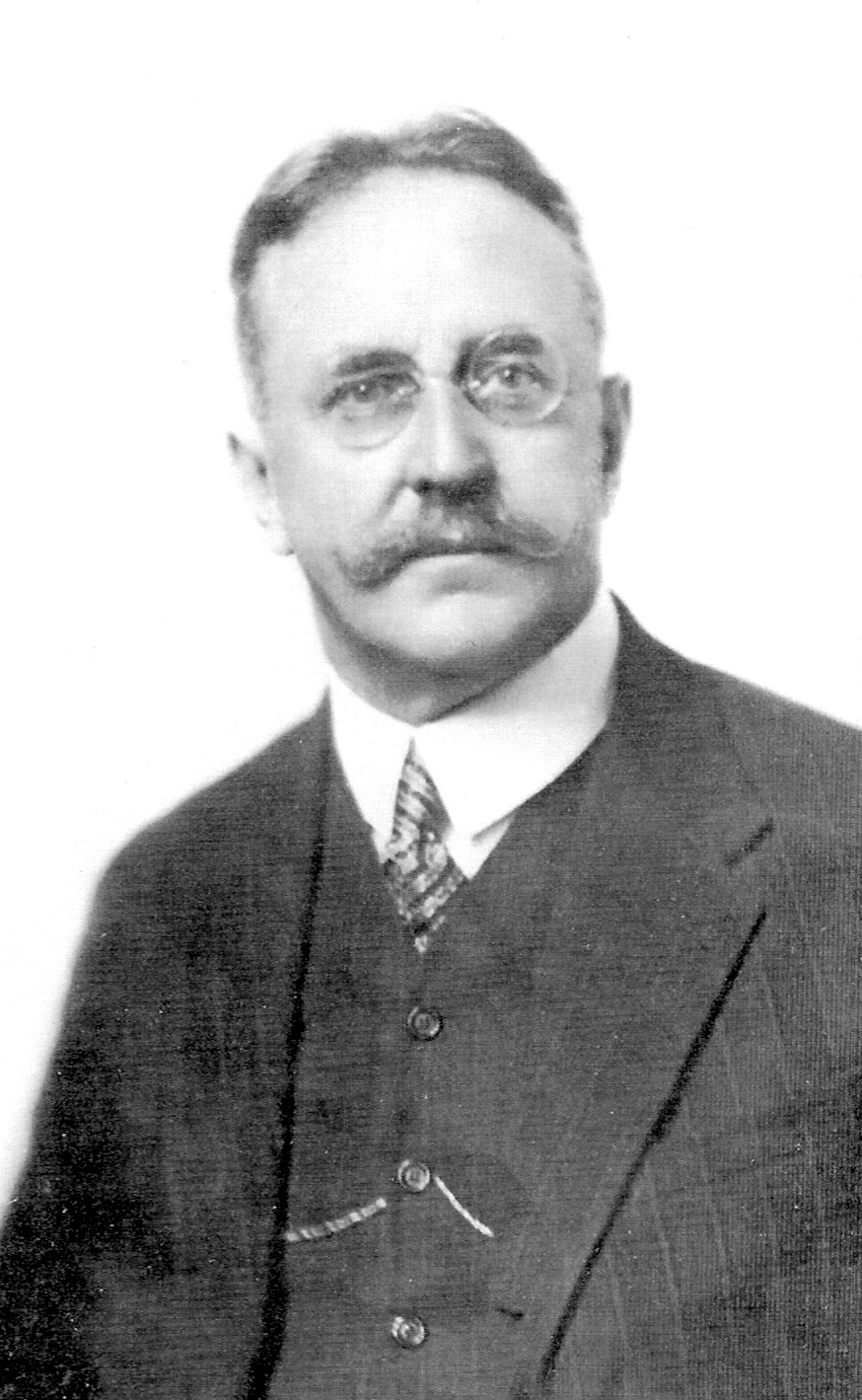
Franz Dinghofer

== First Republic ==
- 1919–1927: Josef Dametz
- 1927–1929: Robert Mehr
- 1929–1930: Eduard Euller
- 1930–1934: Josef Gruber

== Anschluss ==
- 1938–1940: Sepp Wolkerstorfer
- 1940–1944: Leopold Sturma
- 1944–1945: Franz Langoth

== Second Republic ==
- 1945–1962: Ernst Koref
- 1962–1968: Edmund Aigner
- 1968–1969: Theodor Grill
- 1969–1984: Franz Hillinger
- 1984–1988: Hugo Schanovsky
- 1988–2013: Franz Dobusch
- 2013–2024: Klaus Luger
- 2024-present: Dietmar Prammer
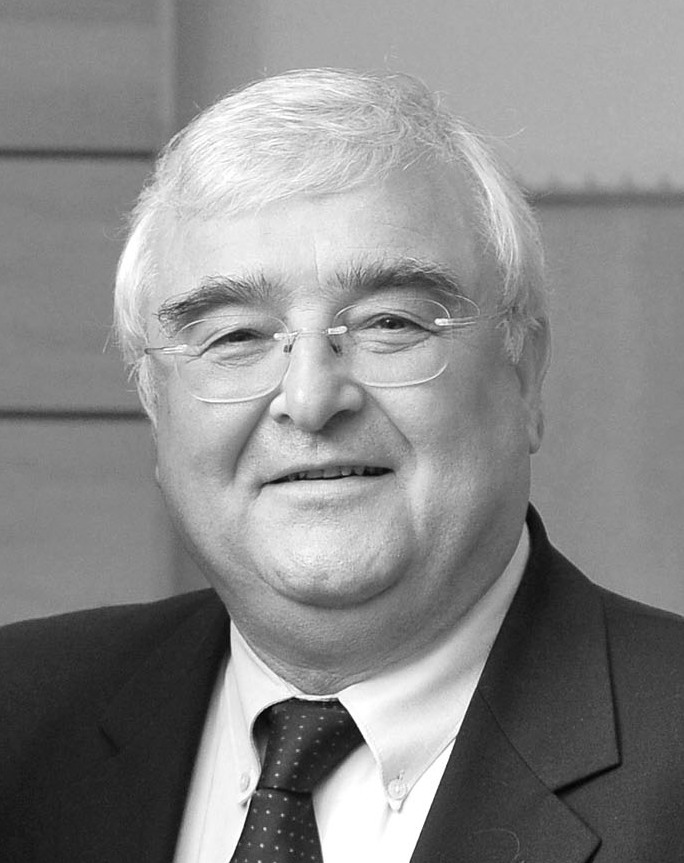
Franz Dobusch

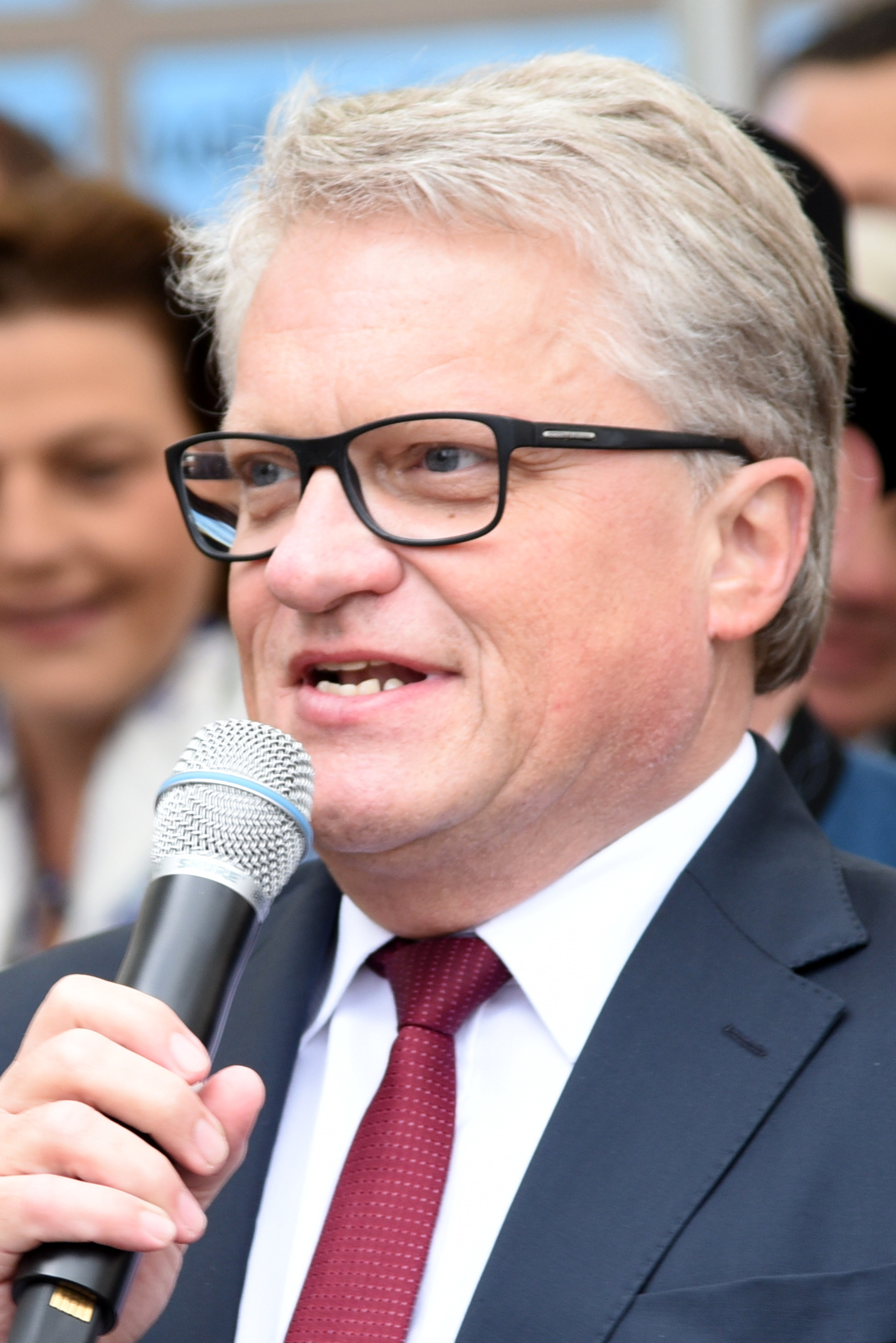
Klaus Luger

== See also ==
- Timeline of Linz
