= History of Styria =

Account of events in Styria

Styria within Austria-Hungary at number 12.

The history of Styria concerns the region roughly corresponding to the modern Austrian state of Styria and the Slovene region of Styria (Štajerska) from its settlement by Germans and Slavs in the Dark Ages until the present. This mountainous and scenic region, which became a centre for mountaineering in the 19th century, is often called the "Green March", because half of the area is covered with forests and one quarter with meadows, grasslands, vineyards and orchards. Styria is also rich in minerals, soft coal and iron, which has been mined at Erzberg since the time of the Romans. The Slovene Hills (Slovene: Slovenske gorice, German: Windische Bühel) is a famous wine-producing district, stretching between Slovenia and Austria. Styria was for long the most densely populated and productive mountain region in Europe.

Styria's population before World War I was 68% German-speaking, 32% Slovene, bordered on (clockwise) Lower Austria, Hungary, Croatia, Carniola, Carinthia, Salzburg, and Upper Austria. In 1918 after World War I the southern, Slovene-speaking third south of the Mur River was incorporated into Slovenia in the Kingdom of Serbs, Croats and Slovenes. The remaining two-thirds became the Austrian federal state of Styria, while the Slovene-speaking third (Lower Styria) formed the informal Styria region in Slovenia, now divided into the Drava and Savinja Statistical Regions and the major part of Slovenian Carinthia. The capital both of the duchy and the Austrian state has always been Graz, which is now also the residence of the governor and the seat of the administration of the land.

== Political history ==
=== Prehistory to Charlemagne ===
Coat of arms of the Dukes of Styria, crowned with the ducal hat.

The Roman history of Styria is as part of Noricum and Pannonia, with the romanized Celtic population of the Taurisci. During the great migrations, various Germanic tribes settled and/or traversed the region using the river valleys and low passes, but about 600 CE the Slavs took possession of the area and settled assimilating the remaining autochthonous romanized population.

When Styria came under the hegemony of Charlemagne as a part of Carantania (Carinthia), erected as a border territory against the Avars and Slavs, there was a large influx of Bavarii and other Christianized Germanic peoples, whom the bishops of Salzburg and the patriarchs of Aquileia kept faithful to Rome. Bishop Vergilius of Salzburg (745-84), was largely instrumental in establishing a church hierarchy in the Duchy and gained for himself the name of "Apostle of Carantania." In 811 Charlemagne made the Drave River the boundary between the dioceses of Salzburg and Aquileia.

=== Middle Ages ===
The March of Styria was created in the Duchy of Carinthia in the late 10th century as a defence against the Magyars. Long called the Carantanian or Carinthian March it was soon ruled by a margravial dynasty called the Otakars that originated from Steyr in Upper Austria thus giving the land its name: "Steiermark". This march was raised to become a duchy by the Emperor Frederick Barbarossa in 1180 after the fall of Henry the Lion of Bavaria.

With the death of Ottokar the first line of rulers of Styria became extinct; the region fell successively to the Babenberg family, rulers of Austria, as stipulated in the Georgenberg Pact; after their extinction to the control of Hungary (1254–60); to King Ottokar of Bohemia; in 1276 to the Habsburgs, who provided it with Habsburgs for Styrian dukes during the years 1379-1439 and 1564–1619.

At the time of the Ottoman invasions in the 16th and 17th centuries the land suffered severely and was depopulated. The Turks made incursions into Styria nearly twenty times; churches, monasteries, cities, and villages were destroyed and plundered, while the population was either killed or carried away into slavery.

=== Modern era ===
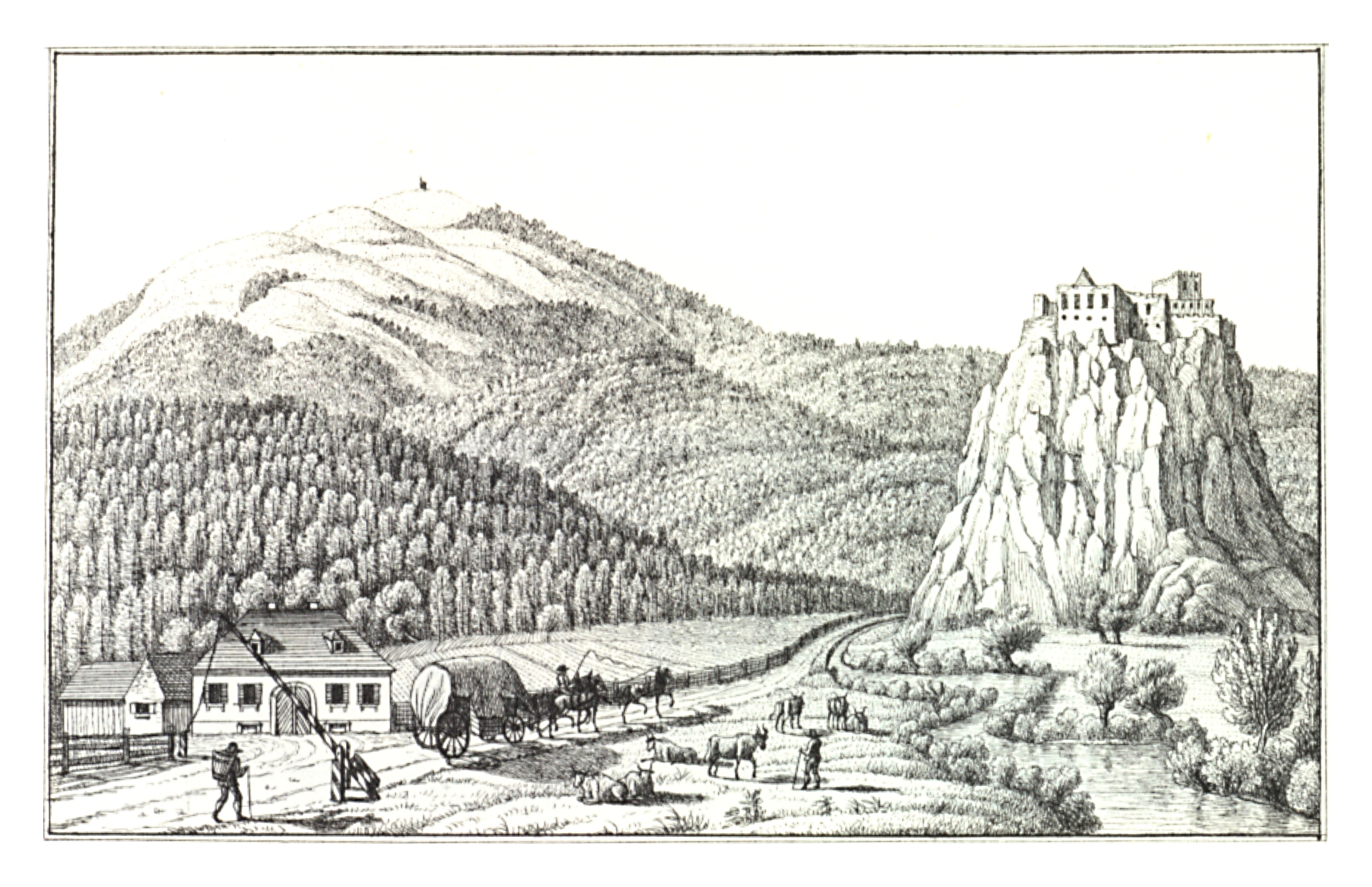
Historical view of the border between Styria and Carinthia, 1830

The Semmering Railway, completed in 1854, was a triumph of engineering in its time, the oldest of the great European mountain railways. It was remarkable for its numerous and long tunnels and viaducts spanning mountain valleys, running from Gloggnitz in Lower Austria to Mürzzuschlag in Styria, and passing through the area's scenery. The railway brought tourists to alpine lake resorts and mineral springs at Rohitsch (today's Rogaška Slatina) and Bad Gleichenberg, the brine springs of Bad Aussee, and the thermal springs of Tuffer (today's Laško), Neuhaus am Klausenbach and Tobelbad.

Following World War I, Styria was divided by the Treaty of Saint Germain. Lower Styria with the cities of Celje and Maribor became part of the Kingdom of Serbs, Croats and Slovenes, while the rest remained with Austria as the State of Styria. Other than in Carinthia, no fighting resulted from this, in spite of a German minority in Slovenia (the larger cities of Lower Styria were largely German-speaking).

Lower Styria was reattached to the Reichsgau Steiermark from 1942 to 1945, whence it was annexed by Germany. After World War II, Styria became part of the British occupation zone in Austria. The lower third was returned to Yugoslavia and today, it makes up about the eastern third of Slovenia.

== Religious history ==
The Protestant Reformation made its way into the country about 1530. Duke Karl (ruling 1564–90), whose wife was the Catholic Duchess Maria of Bavaria, introduced the Counter-Reformation into the country; in 1573 he invited the Jesuits into Styria and in 1586 he founded the Catholic University of Graz. In 1598 his son and successor Ferdinand suppressed all Protestant schools and expelled the teachers and preachers: Protestant doctrines were maintained only in a few isolated mountain valleys, as in the valley of the Inn and the valley of the Mur. On a narrow reading of the Peace of Augsburg, 1555, with its principle of cuius regio, eius religio, only the nobility were not forced to return to the Roman Church; each could have Protestant services privately in his own house.

After Ferdinand had become Holy Roman Emperor in 1619 and had defeated his Protestant opponents in the Battle of White Mountain near Prague in 1620, he forbade all Protestant church services whatsoever (1625). In 1628 he commanded the nobility also to return to the Catholic faith. A large number of noble families, consequently, emigrated from the country. But most of them either returned, or their descendants did so, becoming Catholics and recovering their possessions.

In the second half of the 17th century renewed action against the Protestants in the isolated mountain valleys resulted in the expulsion of Protestant ministers with the peasants who would not give up Protestantism; about 30,000 chose compulsory emigration to Transylvania over conversion. Only an Edict of Toleration issued by Emperor Joseph II as late as 1781 put an end to religious repression. The Protestants then received the right to found parish communities and to exercise their religion in those enclaves undisturbed.

In 1848, all the provinces of the Habsburg monarchy received complete liberty of religion and of conscience, parity of religions, and the right to the public exercise of religion.

Ecclesiastically the province was historically divided into two Catholic prince-bishoprics, Seckau and Lavant. From the time of their foundation both were suffragans of the Archdiocese of Salzburg. The Prince-Bishopric of Seckau was established in 1218; since 1786 the see of the prince-bishop has been Graz. The Prince-Bishopric of Lavant with its bishop's seat at Sankt Andrä in the Carinthian Lavant Valley was founded as a bishopric in 1228 and raised to a prince-bishopric in 1446. In 1847 the bishop's seat was transferred from St. Andrä to Maribor, and after World War I the see's boundaries were adapted to the new political frontiers. A short-lived third Salzburg suffragan diocese of Leoben comprising 157 parishes in the districts of Leoben and Bruck an der Mur existed on Styrian soil from 1786 but was incorporated into the diocese of Graz-Seckau in 1856 Today the see of the bishop of Graz-Seckau is identical in territory with the Austrian State of Styria.

== See also ==
- Timeline of Graz history

== Sources ==
- Styria in the Catholic Encyclopedia
