= Ernst Koref =

Austrian politician (1891–1988)

Ernst Koref (March 11, 1891, in Linz – November 15, 1988, ibid.) was a social democrat politician and the mayor of Linz from 1945 to 1962.

== Biography ==
Ernst Koref was the fifth child of a railway official. He had four younger brothers and sisters. He attended Gymnasium in Linz and thanks to his conspicuous talent, he was allowed to make a speech in the 60th reign anniversary of Kaiser Franz Josef in 1908. Afterwards, Koref studied German studies and English studies in Wien, but for earning his living, he worked on the side as a Hofmeister in the houses of nobilities. In 1914, he gained his PhD and joined the army in the first world war as an officer. He was sent to the Russian front and was taken prisoner. He got away and finished his military service as an interpreter on the Italian front. After the war, he worked as a teacher and schools inspector. From 1927 to 1934, Koref was a member of local council and from 1930 to 1934 a member of National Council. Under subsequent dictatorship, he was put in prison from 1934 and 1944. Koref and his brothers and sisters were discriminated against because of their partially Jewish origin according to the Nuremberg Laws in Nazi era.

After the removal of the national socialist mayor Franz Langoth from office, Koref was appointed mayor of Linz by the American occupying forces and his appointment was confirmed by following democratic elections. Within the bounds of the first states' conference, Koref could successfully prevent the demolition of the conference.

Dr. Ernst Koref was mayor until September 10, 1962. His successor was Edmund Aigner. Until 1958, Koref worked also as the member of national council. In 1981, Koref published his memories in his work The tides of my life. 1981 die Rückschau auf Als ich 19 war

Political offices
Preceded by Franz Langoth	Mayor of Linz; 1945–1962	Succeeded by Edmund Aigner
