= Neues Volksblatt =

Daily newspaper in Austria

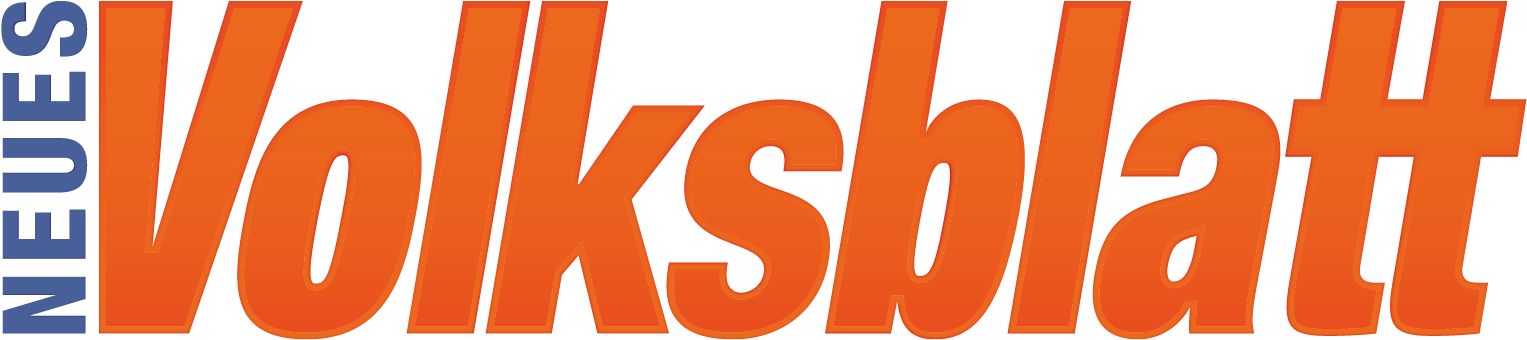
- Type: Daily newspaper
- Founded: 1869; 157 years ago
- Political alignment: Conservatism; Christian Democratic; Austrian People's Party
- Language: German
- Headquarters: Linz
- Country: Austria
- Website: volksblatt.at

Neues Volksblatt was a daily newspaper published in Linz, Austria. The paper was the official organ of the Austrian People's Party. It was in circulation from 1869. From September 2018 the paper was renamed as Oberösterreichische Volksblatt. Operations ceased on 1 January 2025.

== History and profile ==
Neues Volksblatt was established in 1869. The paper has its headquarters in Linz. It is the official organ of the Austrian People's Party and has a Christian socialist stance.

As of 2017 Neues Volksblatt was not part of the Media-Analysis or the Austrian Circulation Survey which are the leading circulation reports for Austrians print publications.

Operations ceased on 1 January 2025.
