= Elevate Festival =

Annual festival in Graz, Austria

The Elevate Festival is an annual festival that takes place around the Schloßberg in Graz, Austria. The aim of the festival is to create a better understanding of the most important issues of our time and to discuss groundbreaking alternatives, innovative projects, and various initiatives in the realm of civil society, social movements and dedicated activism. Elevate combines contemporary music, art and political discourse. The organizational body is a Nonprofit organization. All the discourse and film programme of the festival is free of charge.

== History ==
The starting point for the idea to combine music and political discourse was the Exit-Space event on local cultural policy making in Graz in 2003. In 2005 the concept was expanded into an international festival around the Schloßberg in Graz. The founders and organizers of the festival - Berhard Steirer, Daniel Erlacher and Roland Oreski - had the idea for the festival's name during a ride in the elevator up to the top of the Schloßberg.

== By year ==
=== 2005 ===
For the first time the Elevate Festival took place in 2005. In this year, everything had to do with "Independent People/Independent Movements". Jimmy Wales was an invited speaker at the Festival.

=== 2006 ===
In 2006, the topic of the festival was "Elevate the Debate". The discussions mainly dealt with free media, live video streaming and basic income.

=== 2007 ===
The topic of 2007's Elevate Festival was "Elevate Democracy!" In 2007, Cynthia McKinney and Danny Schechter were at the festival in Graz.

=== 2008 ===
In 2008, "Elevate the Commons" was the theme of the festival. Percy Schmeiser was one of the guests.

=== 2009 ===
The festival was dedicated to the topic "Elevate the Crises" with guests such as Amy Goodman, Pat Mooney, Christian Felber, Raimund Löw or Anneliese Rohrer.

=== 2010 ===
The festival featured Mike Bonanno of The Yes Men and Bill McKibben among others. The main theme was "Elevate the Civil Society".

=== 2011 ===
Johan Galtung, Mark Stevenson, Nafeez Mosaddeq Ahmed looked into the future to explore how to "Elevate the 21st Century".

=== 2012 ===
"Elevate the Apocalypse?": Christian Payne, Jacob Appelbaum, Polly Higgins and others discussed whether we need major catastrophes in order to tackle the challenges of our time.

=== 2013 ===
"Elevate Open Everything?" - guests like Jacob Appelbaum, Birgitta Jónsdóttir, Anne Roth discussed radical openness in technology, innovation, activism, and politics.

=== 2014 ===
To honour the 10th anniversary of the festival the theme "Elevate #10 – Discourse & Activism" invited scientists like John Holloway, computer engineers like Micah Lee and artists such as Antonino D'Ambrosio to draw lessons from the past and look into the future.

=== 2015 ===
"Elevate Creative Response!" - the 11th edition of the festival explored how creative thinking provides avenues to tackle current challenges.

=== 2016 ===
As a result of a European festival cooperation, the theme in 2016 was "We Are Europe" and focused on change processes in Europe. Among the guests were journalist and WikiLeaks activist Sarah Harrison, the philosopher Srećko Horvat, and the French director Hind Meddeb.

=== 2017 ===
The topic the 2017 edition was "Big data, quantification & algorithms - Who will be the decision-makers of the 21st century?".

=== 2018 ===
The role of "Risk/Courage" in the context of societal change will be highlighted during the 2018 festival. With a focus on whistleblowing the controversial WikiLeaks founder Julian Assange will be among the speakers.

=== 2019 ===
The Elevate Festival 2019 explores and debates the concept of "Truth" with guests like animal rights activist Pamela Anderson, poet Nnimmo Bassey, and philosopher Srećko Horvat.

=== 2020 ===
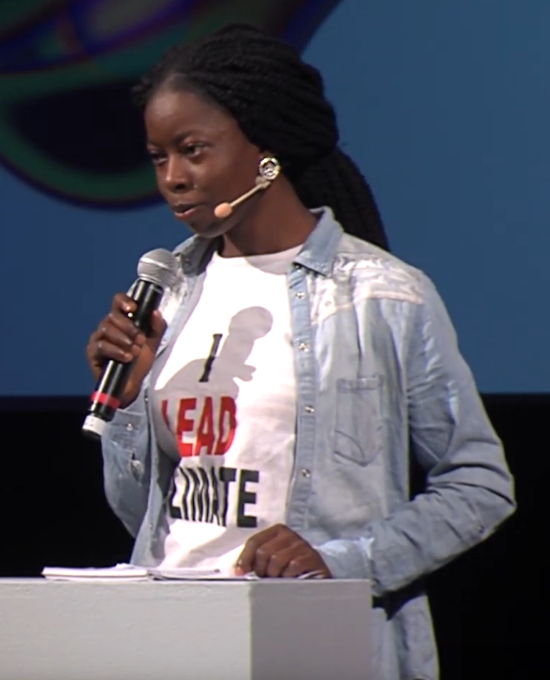
Adenike Oladosu presenting the opening speech at the 2020 Elevate Festival

"Human Nature" and the relationship between humans, nature and technological development is the motto of the 2020 Elevate Festival. The philosopher Ariadne von Schirach, the film maker Douglas Rushkoff and the activist Elizabeth Wathuti are among the guests in the discourse program.

== Elevate Awards ==
Between 2012 and 2015, the Elevate Awards were granted to people, organizations, and initiatives which are actively working for social, ecological and/or economical justice. There were three categories: The International Elevate Award, the Elevate Award Steiermark for regional projects in Austria and the Elevate Artivism Award for the threshold between arts and activism.

=== Elevate Awards 2012 ===
- Elevate Award Steiermark: Hofkollektiv Wieserhoisl
- International Elevate Award: Réseau des femmes pour le développement durable en Afrique (REFDAF)
- Elevate Artivism Award: Susanne Prosegga

=== Elevate Awards 2013 ===
- Elevate Award Steiermark: Open BioLab Graz
- International Elevate Award: Refugee Protest Camp Vienna
- Elevate Artivism Award: HOAM:ART

=== Elevate Awards 2014 ===
- Elevate Award Steiermark: KAMA Graz
- International Elevate Award: Cryptocat
- Elevate Artivism Award: Partycipation

=== Elevate Awards 2015 ===
- Elevate Award Steiermark: Allerleihladen
- International Elevate Award: White Helmets
- Elevate Artivism Award: Manu Luksch
