= Illustrated Europe =

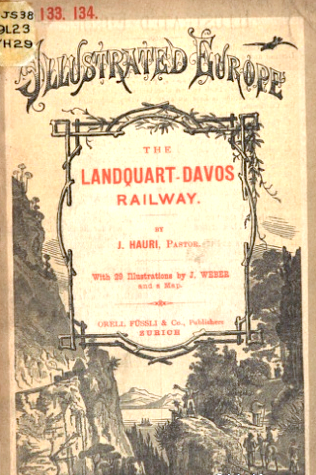
Illustrated Europe no.133-134

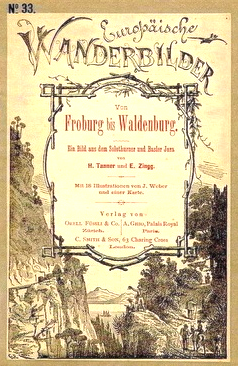
Europäische Wanderbilder no.33

Illustrated Europe was a series of travel guide books to Europe published by Orell Fussli & Co. of Zürich and C. Smith & Son of London. It also appeared in a German-language edition (Europäische Wanderbilder) and a French-language edition (L'Europe illustré). The guides described localities in Austria, Germany, Hungary, Italy, and Switzerland in the 1880s-1890s.
