= Schlossberg (Graz) =

Hill and former fortress in Graz, Austria

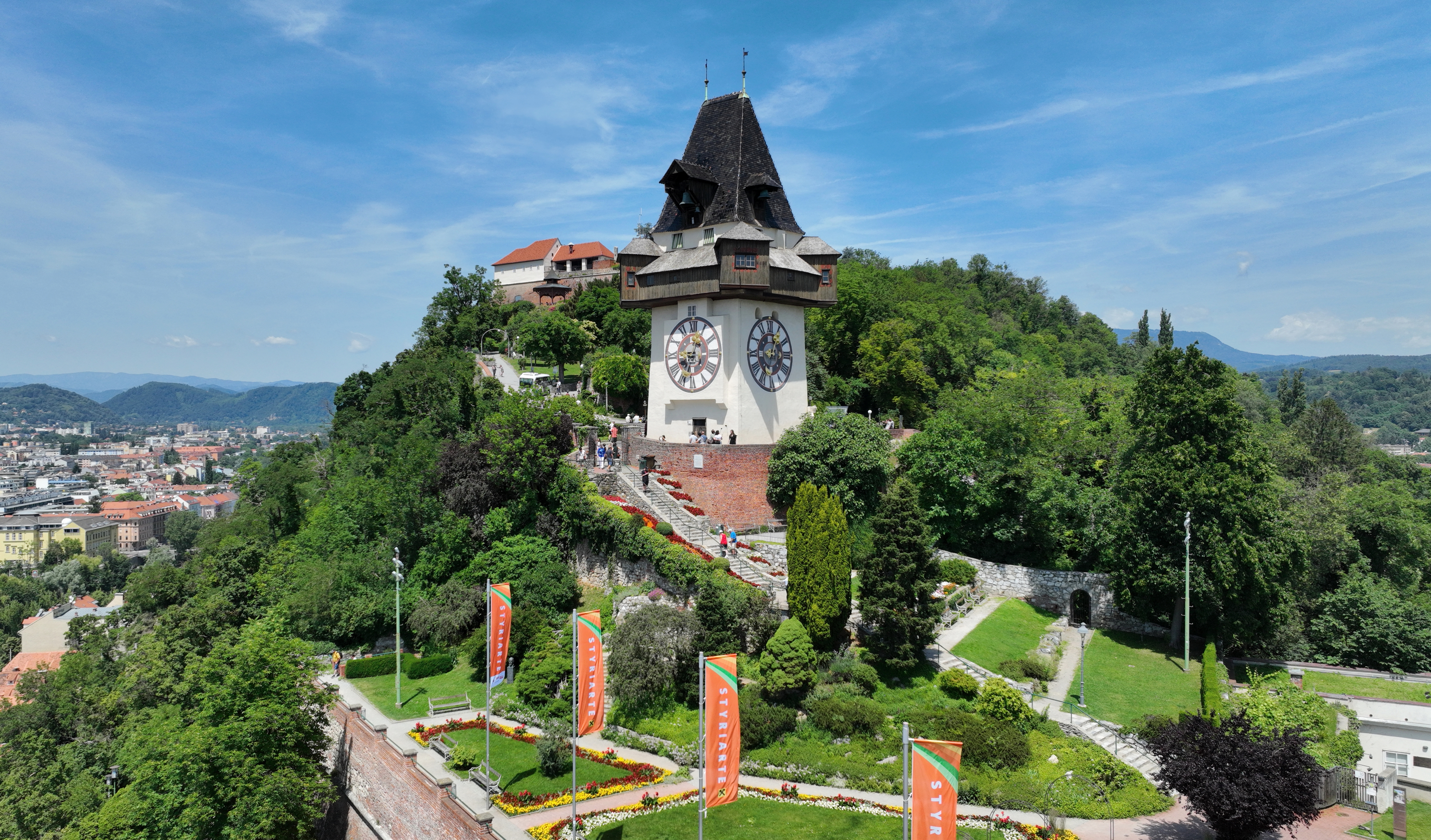
- Schlossberg with clock tower

Highest point
- Elevation: 473 m (1,552 ft)
- Prominence: 370 m (1,210 ft)
- Coordinates: 47°04′34″N 15°26′14″E

Naming
- English translation: Castle-Mountain
- Language of name: German

Geography
- Location: Styria, Austria
- Parent range: Grazer Bergland, 'Randgebirge' east of the Mur

Geology
- Rock age: Devonian
- Mountain type: Tree-clad

Climbing
- Easiest route: Schlossberg Funicular/ lift

The Schlossberg (German pronunciation: [ˈʃlɔsbɛʁk], "Castle Hill") is a tree-clad hill and the site of a fortress in the centre of the city of Graz, Austria. The hill, at 473 m (1,552 ft) above sea level, is now a public park and affords extensive views of the city. It is the site of several entertainment venues, cafés, and restaurants, and is managed by Holding Graz, the city-owned utility company.

== History ==
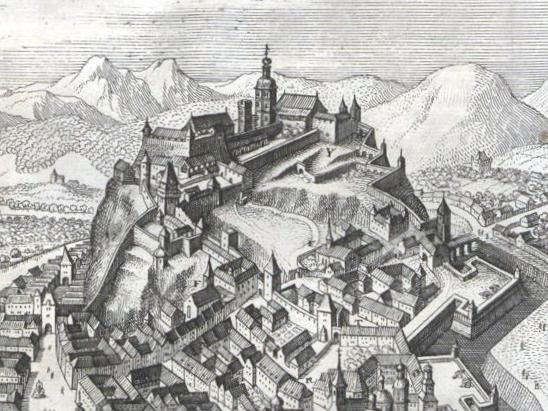
Schloßberg castle depicted in 1679.

The fortification of the Schlossberg goes back to at least the 10th century. In the mid-16th century, a 400-metre-long (1,300 ft) fortress was constructed by architects from the north of Italy. There are records of a cable-hauled lift being in use between 1528 and 1595 to move construction materials for the fortifications. The castle was never conquered, but it was largely demolished by Napoleonic forces under the Treaty of Schönbrunn of 1809. The clock tower (the Uhrturm) and bell tower (the Glockenturm) were spared after the people of Graz paid a ransom for their preservation.

The remains of the castle were turned into a public park by Ludwig von Welden in 1839. The park contains the Uhrturm, the Glockenturm, a cistern (the Türkenbrunnen) and two bastions from the old castle. The Uhrturm is a recognisable icon for the city, and is unusual in that the clock's hands have opposite roles to the common notion, with the larger one marking hours while the smaller is for minutes. The Glockenturm contains Liesl, the heaviest bell in Graz.

Near the Uhrturm is a café with views over the old town. Additionally, on the western side of the Schlossberg, there are two small cafés, one with table service and another with self-service. Next to the terminus of the funicular railway there is a hilltop restaurant with views of western Graz. In what was once the cellar of one of the ruined bastions is the Kasemattenbühne, an open-air stage for concerts and performances.

Below the Schlossberg hill is an extensive system of tunnels, which were created during the Second World War to protect the civilian population of Graz from aerial bombing. Some of these tunnels, including a passage from Schlossbergplatz to Karmeliterplatz, are still accessible, but many are closed to the public.

== Location and accessibility ==
The Schlossberg lies in the center of Graz, northeast of the main square and east of the river Mur.

From all four sides, steep paths with a few interconnections (one being a sloped tunnel) lead up to the top plateau. Delivery vehicle traffic is possible from Wickenburggasse (in the north) and Karmeliterplatz (south via Sporgasse) but is restricted to mornings and controlled by barriers and cameras. Cyclists only very seldom ascend, as this is formally forbidden.

The Schlossberg funicular (Schloßbergbahn) carries passengers from the western foot of the hill up to the restaurant near the top, while a pair of elevators lead up to another restaurant overlooking the clocktower. At ground level, the lift is reached via a short tunnel from Schloßbergplatz on the western side of the hill.

Two paths from Wickenburggasse provide access through the tree-covered northern side.

Another path provides access from the east, between Paulustor and Landessportzentrum and at the monument for Friedrich Ludwig Jahn in the Stadtpark.

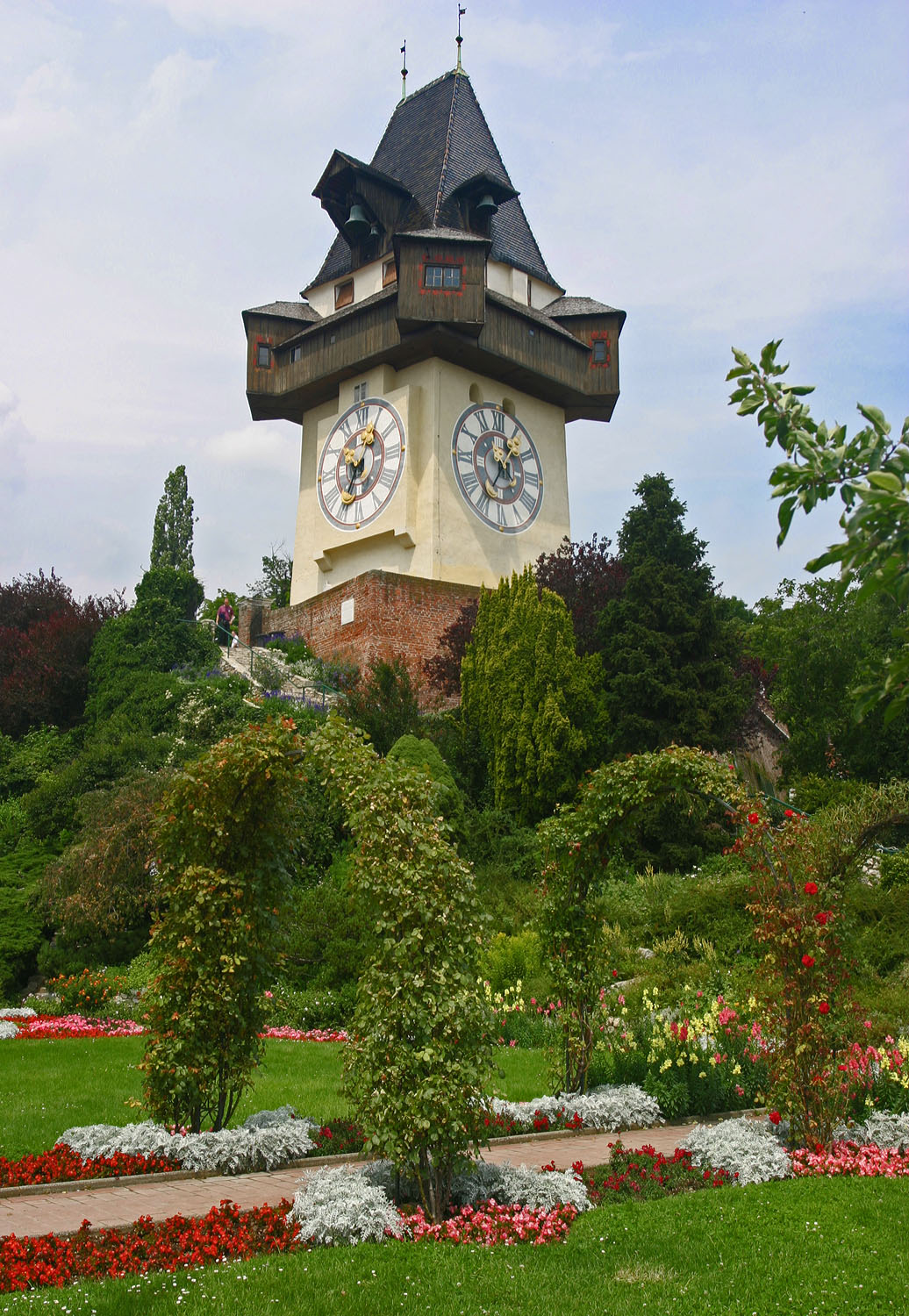
The Uhrturm and park

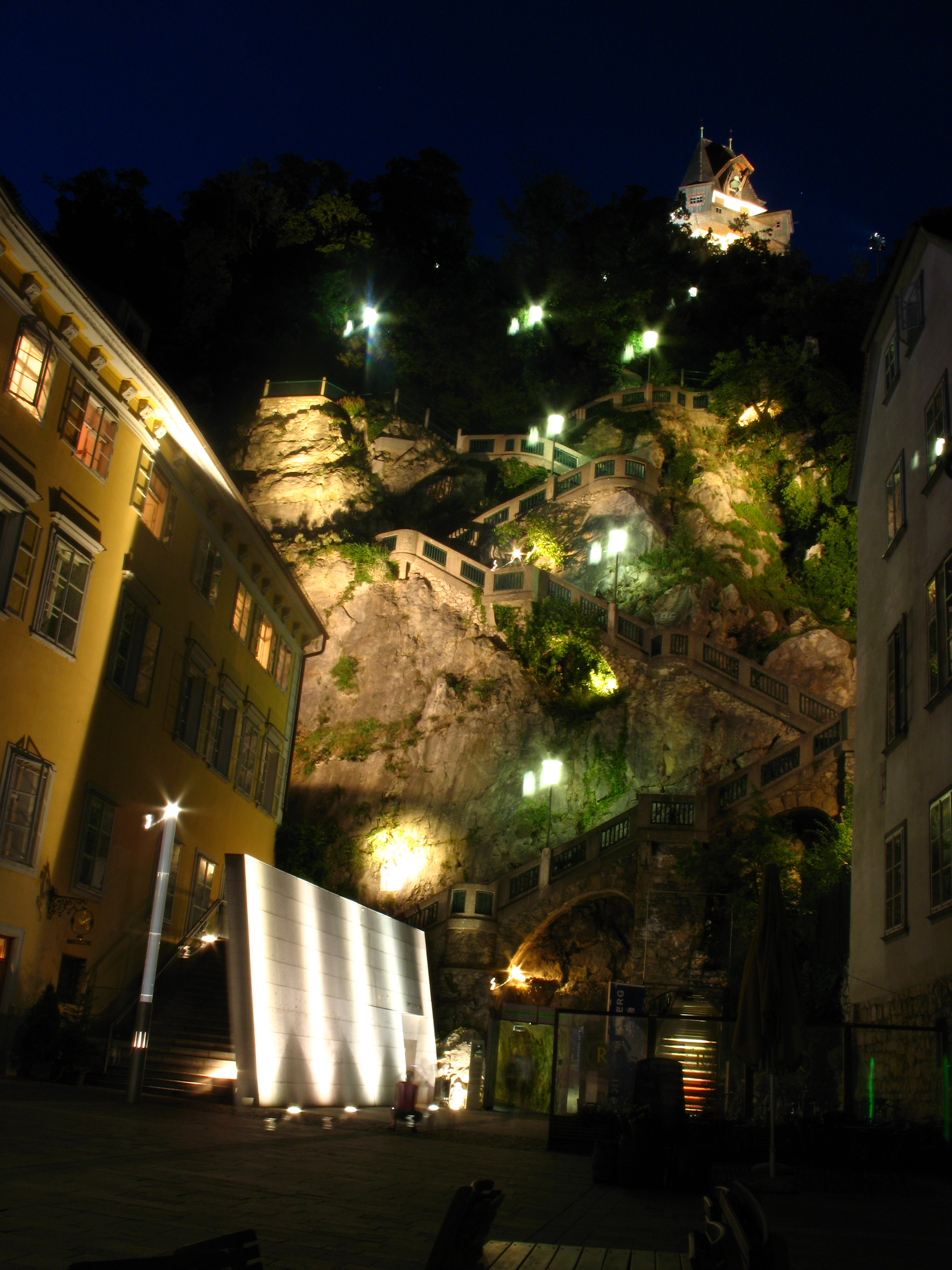
Schlossbergplatz by night, with staircase up to castle

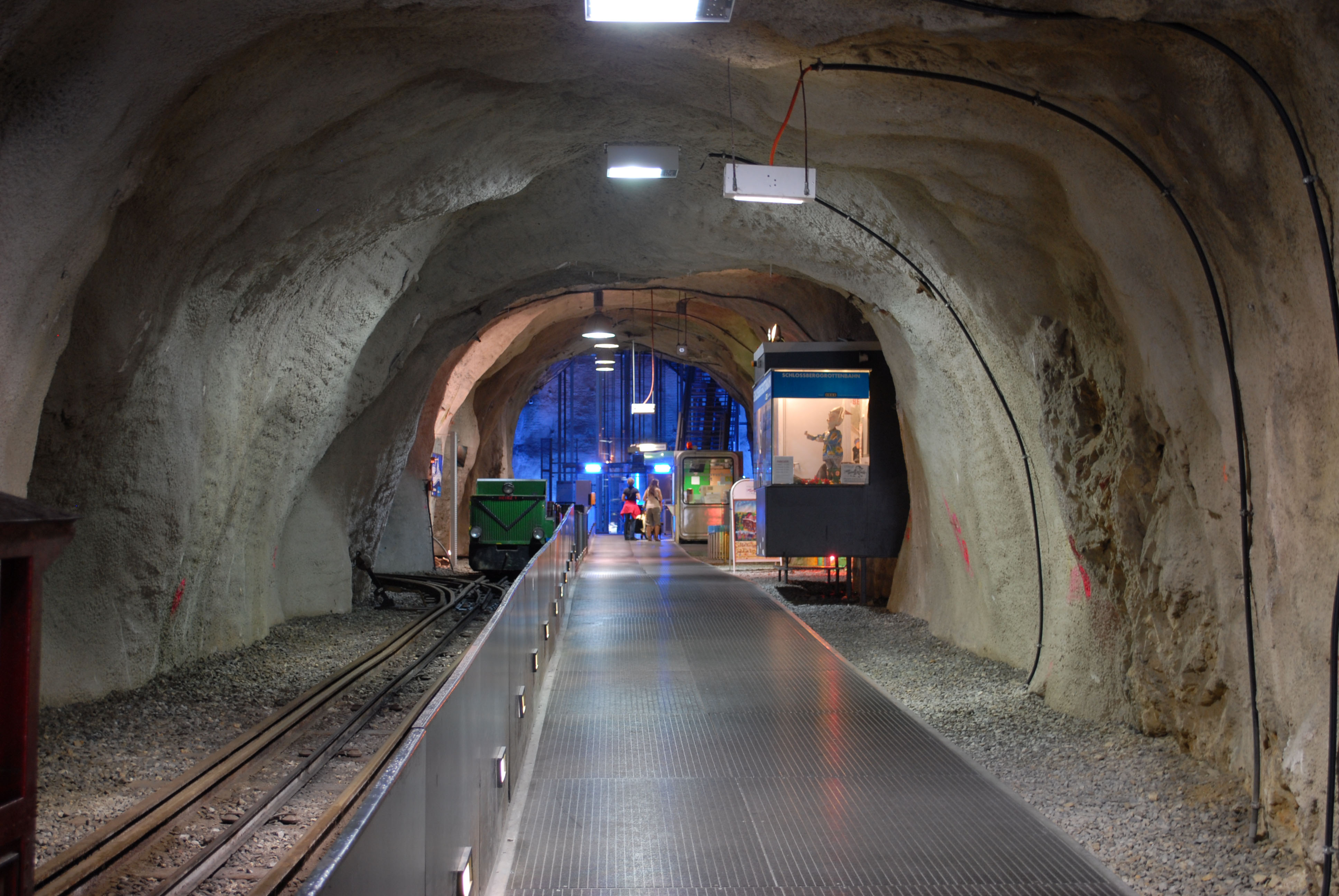
Tunnel under Schlossberg looking towards the Schlossberg lift

== Entertainment ==
Each year, the Elevate Festival, a festival for contemporary music, art, and political discourse, is held in various venues in and around the Schlossberg.

In the large tunnel connecting the elevator to the Schlossbergplatz, the Fairytale Express Graz can be found. This is a popular grotto railway ride for children.

In February 2017, construction on a large indoor slide Sclossbergrutsche Graz was completed. The slide is constructed out of large tubular metal pieces and winds around the elevator. The slide rises 64 metres (210 ft) and is 170 metres (560 ft) long. A ride takes approximately 40 seconds and costs up to €7.80.

At the top of the mountain is the Kasemattenbühne, an open-air concert venue. It is one of the most popular venues in Graz and has a retractable roof that can be used in inclement weather. The venue has a capacity of 1,310 people.
