= History of the Social Democratic Party of Austria =

Aspect of Austrian political history

Since its foundation in 1889, the Social Democratic Party has often been one of the main political forces in Austria. At the start of the First World War it was the strongest party in parliament, and on the ending of that war in 1918 the party leader Karl Renner became chancellor of the First Republic. The party lost power in 1920, but retained a strong base of support in the capital Vienna. A period of rising political violence culminated in the banning of the Social Democratic Party under the Austrofascist dictatorship (1934–38).

In 1918, the Socialists supported union with Germany, but the Allies forbid this in the treaty of St. Germain. When the Nazis took power in Germany the Socialists changed their view on the Anschluss, which took place in 1938 and brought Austria into the Second World War. In 1945 the party was reconstituted as the "Socialist Party of Austria" (Sozialistische Partei Österreichs, SPÖ), led by Adolf Schärf. The party entered the government of the Second Republic as part of a grand coalition with the People's Party (ÖVP) until 1966, Renner becoming the Republic's first president.

From 1971 to 1983, under Bruno Kreisky, the Socialist Party was the sole governing party. For the following three years it ruled in coalition with the Freedom Party (FPÖ), then up to 2000 it was again part of a grand coalition with the ÖVP, with Franz Vranitzky as Chancellor until 1997. In 1991 it reverted to including "Democratic" in its name, becoming the "Social Democratic Party of Austria" (Sozialdemokratische Partei Österreichs).

During this period, the grand coalition combined with the "Proporz" system – whereby important posts throughout the government were shared out between members of the two main parties – evoked rising discontent. This was a factor in the growing popularity of the FPÖ, which came second to the SPÖ in elections in 1999. The following year the FPÖ and ÖVP formed a rightwing coalition, displacing the Social Democrats from a share in government. While this coalition was still in power, the Social Democrat Heinz Fischer was elected president in 2004. Following the 2006 elections another grand coalition was formed between the SPÖ and ÖVP, this lasting until 2017.

== From the beginnings until 1918 ==
Socialist and worker's movements and associations had already started to form in Austria by the mid-19th century. The party's first meeting took place in 1874 in Neudörfl in what later became Burgenland. The following years saw factional infighting, and the party split into moderate and more radical factions.

It was united in 1889 as the Social Democratic Workers' Party of Austria (German: Sozialdemokratische Arbeiterpartei Österreichs, SDAPÖ) through the work of Doctor Victor Adler. At the party congress in Hainfeld, the party decided to accept Adler's Declaration of Principles on 30 December 1888. 1 January 1889 is therefore considered the party's founding date. On 12 July 1889 the first issue of the party newspaper the Arbeiter-Zeitung was printed. Initially close to Marxism, the party continued to grow especially in Vienna and the industrial areas of Bohemia, Moravia, Styria, Lower Austria and Upper Austria.

The party participated in the founding of the Second International in Paris on 14 July 1889. The party campaigned for more rights for workers, including their right to vote. In the Brünner Programm of September 1899, the Socialists demanded that the Austro-Hungarian Empire be reformed into a federal democratic state.

The Social Democrats were allowed to run in the City Council (Gemeinderat) elections of Vienna on 30 May 1890.

In Trieste the Italian-speaking "Social Democratic League" (Lega Social Democratica) decided at its congress in December 1897 to change its name to "Adriatic Italian Section of the Social Democratic Workers' Party of Austria" (Sezione Italian Adriatica del Partito dei Lavoratori Social Democratici in Austria). Notably, the Trieste Socialists preferred to use the label "socialist" rather than "social democrat".

In 1907, after a general strike, universal suffrage was granted. In the elections to the House of Deputies in the Reichsrat, the Social Democrats were able to win many votes. Out of a total of 516 seats, the party won 87 seats, becoming the second strongest fraction in parliament after the Christian Social Party. Eventually, by 1911, the Socialists became the strongest party in parliament.

The party initially supported the declaration of war against Serbia after the Assassination in Sarajevo of Archduke Franz Ferdinand and his wife Sophie, Duchess of Hohenberg in 1914, but soon realised that the disastrous war was untenable. After the death of Emperor Franz Joseph, the first peace-meeting was held in December 1916. By January 1918, strikes were breaking out, calling for an end of the war and the terrible suffering that the people, especially the worker's families, had to endure.

By October, a provisional national assembly ("Provisorische Nationalversammlung") was convened under the Social Democrat Karl Renner, which tried to work out a provisional constitution (Provisorische Verfassung) under the leadership of a new state council led by the new state chancellor Renner. The Social Democrats wanted a new form of government and, on 12 November 1918, the republic was proclaimed by Renner. Renner's government introduced an eight-hour workday and paid holidays.

== First Republic ==
The party had moderate success in the 1920s, but its conflict with right wing forces escalated until it was defeated in the Austrian Civil War.

=== Establishment of the First Republic ===
The SDAPÖ played an important role in the establishment of the First Republic. On 11 November 1918 Emperor Charles I relinquished his right to take part in Austrian affairs of state. The following day Karl Renner was declared Chancellor of the Republic of German-Austria.

The Bohemian provincial organization of SDAPÖ held a conference in Teplice 31 August – 3 September 1919 at which it re-constituted itself as a separate party, the German Social Democratic Workers Party in the Czechoslovak Republic.

The party clearly wanted to steer Austria towards political union with Germany, calling the new Austrian republic "Deutsch-Österreich" (German-Austria). But the Treaty of St. Germain clearly forbade any unification between Austria and Germany. The SDAPÖ nevertheless still advocated such a union during the existence of the First Republic, as they hoped for a strengthening of their position and the socialist cause within a Greater Germany.

In the first elections for the constitutional national assembly on 16 February 1919, women were allowed to vote for the first time. The SDAPÖ became the strongest party and formed a grand coalition with the anti-Anschluss Christian Social Party (CS).

=== Red Vienna ===
In May, elections for the city council of Vienna followed: out of 165 mandates the social democrats won 100 seats. Jakob Reumann became the first social-democratic mayor of Vienna. Vienna was going to continue to be the stronghold of the socialists in a largely conservative-governed nation. The socialist-led city government built the first Gemeindebauten for the working class, such as the Karl-Marx-Hof, Sandleitenhof, and the public housing estates on the Gürtel ring road, and instituted social, healthcare and educational reforms. These measures indeed ameliorated the living conditions for workers and raised their standard of living. This deepened the ties of workers towards the party and created a large pool of loyalists on whom the party could always depend, giving rise to the term "Rotes Wien" (Red Vienna) of the 1920s.

The party was a member of the Labour and Socialist International between 1923 and 1940.

Within the grand coalition, the parties were able to agree on a package of reforms such as the 8-hour-day (8-Stunden-Tag), the worker's council law (Betriebsrätegesetz) and negotiations for a new republican constitution, which came into force on 10 November 1920. After the parliamentary elections in October 1920, the SDAPÖ left the grand coalition after the CS won the majority of votes. The Socialists would remain in opposition during the First Republic.

But the SDAPÖ continued to be internally divided in roughly two wings: on the one side were the moderates under the leadership of former chancellor Karl Renner, who advocated a parliamentary, liberal democracy and the welfare state; on the other side were the more radical Austromarxists under the leadership of Otto Bauer. Especially the latter part did not wish any further cooperation with the CS, which led to an increase in political instability over time as political views became grew more extreme and fractious.

Feeling increasingly under threat, most political parties formed their own military wings. In May 1924, the SDAPÖ founded its own paramilitary wing, the Republikanischer Schutzbund (Republican Protection League). The Communist Party of Austria (KPÖ) formed its Red Brigades and the conservative CS followed suit, founding its Heimwehr (Homeland Protection Force). The existence of armed political militias and vigilante groups, alongside the regular police and army forces, did not bode well for the stability of the young republic. The founding of these militias was a response to increased political tension, but also aggravated it, increasing the chances of open, violent clashes as political parties within parliament continued their fighting. On 3 November 1926, the so-called "Linzer Programm" was agreed upon at the SDAPÖ party convention, which was heavily influenced by Otto Bauer's wing and reinforced the differences between the opposition Christian Social Party and the Social Democrats.

Logo of the SDAPÖ until 1934

On 30 January 1927, members of the conservative Heimwehr shot at members of the Republikanischer Schutzbund in Schattendorf, resulting in two deaths. In the Schattendorfer Urteil trial that followed, the jury found the accused not guilty in July 1927. Members of the Republikanischer Schutzbund, the SDAPÖ, and workers were outraged by this verdict and launched demonstrations on 15 July to protest. The mob vented its frustration, and eventually moved towards the Palace of Justice, setting it on fire. Clashes with the police left 85 workers and four policemen dead and up to 600 people were injured. The burning of the Palace of Justice and the bloodshed surrounding it symbolised a break within the republic, marking the coming end of democracy.

The political atmosphere became increasingly poisoned and untenable. The conservatives shored their position against the Social Democrats, and on 18 May 1930 the Heimwehr of the CS issued its Korneuburger Eid (Oath of Korneuburg), in which it openly called for the overthrow of the parliamentary democracy ("Wir verwerfen den westlichen demokratischen Parlamentarismus und den Parteienstaat!") Both under the Austro-fascist dictatorship (1934–1938) and during the German occupation of Austria between 1938 and 1945, the SDAPÖ was banned and persecuted heavily, but after liberation, the Social Democrats became a major political force in post-war Austria.

== During Austrofascism ==
On 7 March 1933, parliament in effect shut itself down due to a minor technicality in the parliamentary procedures. During a vote impasse, the collective presidency of the lower house stepped down from office and in effect left the house without a speaker or chair. Federal Chancellor Engelbert Dollfuss seized the opportunity to circumvent parliament and govern with a number of emergency decrees through an emergency powers act from 1917. Pressure was increased on the SDAPÖ, political activities were increasingly curtailed, press censorship increased. The Social Democrats protested and rallied their forces in the worker's strongholds in Vienna, Linz, and other industrial areas and towns. Tension openly erupted on 12 February 1934, when the police entered the local party headquarters in Linz for a search. The socialist militia resisted the police force, and during the course of the week armed fighting broke out in Vienna and other SDAPÖ strongholds such as industrial areas. The army was called in to crush the uprising in Vienna, shelling the Karl-Marx-Hof where members of the Schutzbund were holed up. The civil war lasted until 15 February. In the end the social-democratic movement was completely outlawed and most of the leadership arrested. The end of the civil war marked the definite end of the First Republic and the start of the Austro-fascist state under the leadership of Dollfuss.

The crushing of the Social Democrats opposition by the conservatives however meant a further weakening of Austria, as infighting within the Heimwehr and the conservatives continued. Chancellor Dollfuss himself was assassinated 10 weeks after the end of the civil war by National socialists. Adolf Hitler was increasingly influencing political affairs in Austria. Nazi Germany was increasing the pressure by scheming and manipulating political events, as well as planning and carrying out terrorist attacks on infrastructure within Austria. The successor of Dollfuss, the conservative chancellor Kurt von Schuschnigg, tried a new round of talks with the outlawed social-democrats and even the monarchists, in order to stabilise the situation again. The Socialists favoured democracy, but were lukewarm to the concept of an independent Austria. The majority of conservatives wanted to keep an independent Austria, however in the form of an Austro-fascist regime. The extreme fighting and enmity between the two parties resulted in both the abolition of democracy and the end of Austria as an independent entity. On 12 March 1938, the weakened Austrian government under Chancellor Schuschnigg was forced to step down by Hitler under the threat of war, and Austria was annexed into Nazi Germany.

The Anschluss was initially enthusiastically greeted by many Social Democrats, such as the former chancellor Karl Renner who pledged to vote "yes" in a referendum on the Anschluss ("Ich stimme mit 'Ja'") and finally realise the old dream of a union with Germany. Although democracy was not in sight, at least Hitler's policies promised more work and equality for many workers and labourers, as well as further socialist reforms and political stability.

== During the beginning of the Second Republic ==
The battle of Vienna between Soviet and Nazi forces was over on 13 April 1945. Immediately the party was refounded as the "Socialist Party of Austria" (Sozialistische Partei Österreichs, SPÖ). The first party chairman was Adolf Schärf. After tyranny, war and destruction, the country had to be reconstructed while enduring hunger and deprivation. The traumatic experience under German rule brought a swing in domestic opinion away from Pan-Germanism and towards the idea of Austria as an independent, sovereign and democratic country. The two former enemies, the conservatives and the Socialists, put aside their differences in order to work towards the prosperity and renewed sovereignty of the country. Both sides entered into a grand coalition government that would last for the next 21 years until 1966.

The Soviet Union had the most influence as an occupying allied power in the immediate post-war years. Joseph Stalin was interested in integrating the newly liberated Austria into the Soviet bloc. The Communist Party of Austria were the only party who could claim to have consistently fought against the Nazi regime, and they largely lay under the protection and guidance from Moscow. Any new Austrian government would therefore have to integrate them as well. Karl Renner tried to position himself as the man of the hour who could act as a bridge between the conservatives and the communists. The Soviets and the other allied powers had large reservations about Renner, whom they viewed as an opportunist. Renner tried to convince a sceptical Stalin in a letter, where he expressed his mea culpa for his previous support of the Anschluss, at the same presenting himself as the only credible Socialist politician left able to reach an agreement with the Communists.

If Renner convinced Stalin, or if it was out of pure necessity, is not entirely clear, but the Soviets tentatively decided to support Renner, maybe in order to win more influence over the government in time. With Soviet support Karl Renner and Leopold Kunschak proclaimed a provisional Austrian state government on 27 April 1945 in the parliament building in Vienna. The proclamation aimed to re-establish an independent Austria. Historic photographs show Renner reading out the proclamation in the old imperial Chamber of the House of Representatives (Abgeordnetenhaus), with Soviet officers sitting in the back benches. This alarmed the western allies, who feared a plot by the Soviets to establish a people's republic, a tactic that worked in Hungary and East Germany, where the social democrats there were forcibly integrated with the communist party. However, for the moment, the Austrian socialists were allowed to re-establish their party and operate relatively freely. The new party also established their own newspaper, the "Arbeiter-Zeitung" on 4 August of the same year.

Ex-chancellor Renner was elected as the new Federal President of Austria by the Federal Assembly on 20 October 1945. Renner would hold this office until his death on 31 December 1950. The party held its first congress since 1933 in December 1945. The SPÖ decided to make its peace with the conservatives, since their fighting was partly responsible for the failure of the First Republic. The party entered an all encompassing grand coalition with the Austrian People's Party (ÖVP), the successor party of the old Christian Social Party. This form of a grand coalition would last for the next 21 years until 1966.

After the death of Karl Renner in 1950, Theodor Körner was elected as Federal President on 26 May 1951. In Frankfurt in Germany, the Socialist International was founded, of which the SPÖ was one of the charter members. In May 1957 Bruno Pittermann became party chairman. Former chairman Adolf Schärf was elected as Federal President in April 1957 and re-elected for a second term in 1963. He was succeeded in May 1965 by Franz Jonas, who also hailed from the socialist party.

The grand coalition governments of SPÖ and ÖVP were marked by a desire to stabilise the political and social situation and concentrate on economic growth and social equality. One of the first acts of the grand coalition was able to agree on a new law about worker's vacation regulations on 25 July 1946. The party followed a rather moderate line and tried to cooperate with its coalition partner. Many state enterprises were nationalised and the situation of the worker ameliorated with work incentives and social benefits. The neutrality that was required by Austria meant that the country had little to worry about military spending and obligations to any military bloc. Instead it tried to act as a mediator between two sides in any international conflict, concentrating on tasks within the United Nations framework. Nevertheless, on 4 January 1960, Foreign Minister Bruno Kreisky was able to sign the accession treaty of Austria into the European Free Trade Association (EFTA).

== The Bruno Kreisky era ==
In the parliamentary elections of April 1966, the ÖVP won a governmental majority and was thus able to rule alone. The Socialists left the grand coalition government, going into opposition. On 30 January 1967 Bruno Kreisky was elected as party chairman. In the National Council elections of March 1970, the SPÖ won with a relative majority, but was only able to build a minority government that counted on support from the Freedom Party of Austria (FPÖ). This government was short-lived: new snap elections had to be held in October 1971. This time the SPÖ was able to win the absolute majority in parliament. This ushered in a period of Socialist-led governments for the next 13 years, led by the charismatic Bruno Kreisky who would become one of the most important statesmen of the Second Republic.

In June 1974, the SPÖ-nominated candidate Rudolf Kirchschläger won the 1974 presidential election. On the economic side, the 40-hour working week, a project by the SPÖ, was passed in parliament and became law.

The success of the economy and the international high-profile Austria was enjoying due to its neutrality ushered in another victory for Kreisky and the SPÖ in the legislative election of May 1979, where the party won 51% of all votes. Nevertheless, the party failed to win another absolute majority in the following elections in April 1983. Kreisky stepped down and Fred Sinowatz became the new chancellor and formed a coalition government with the FPÖ. Sinowatz later took over as party chairman from Kreisky in October of the same year.

Sinowatz tried to rely on the liberal wing of the FPÖ, however political infighting and the rise of the right-wing populist politician Jörg Haider to the chairmanship of the FPÖ made a further coalition with its junior partner for the SPÖ impossible. Franz Vranitzky, who replaced Sinowatz in June 1986, ended the so-called "small coalition" and called for fresh elections. In the November 1986 legislative election, the SPÖ became strongest party again and entered into a grand coalition with the ÖVP. Vranitzky himself was elected as party chairman in May 1988.

== Second grand coalition phase with ÖVP ==
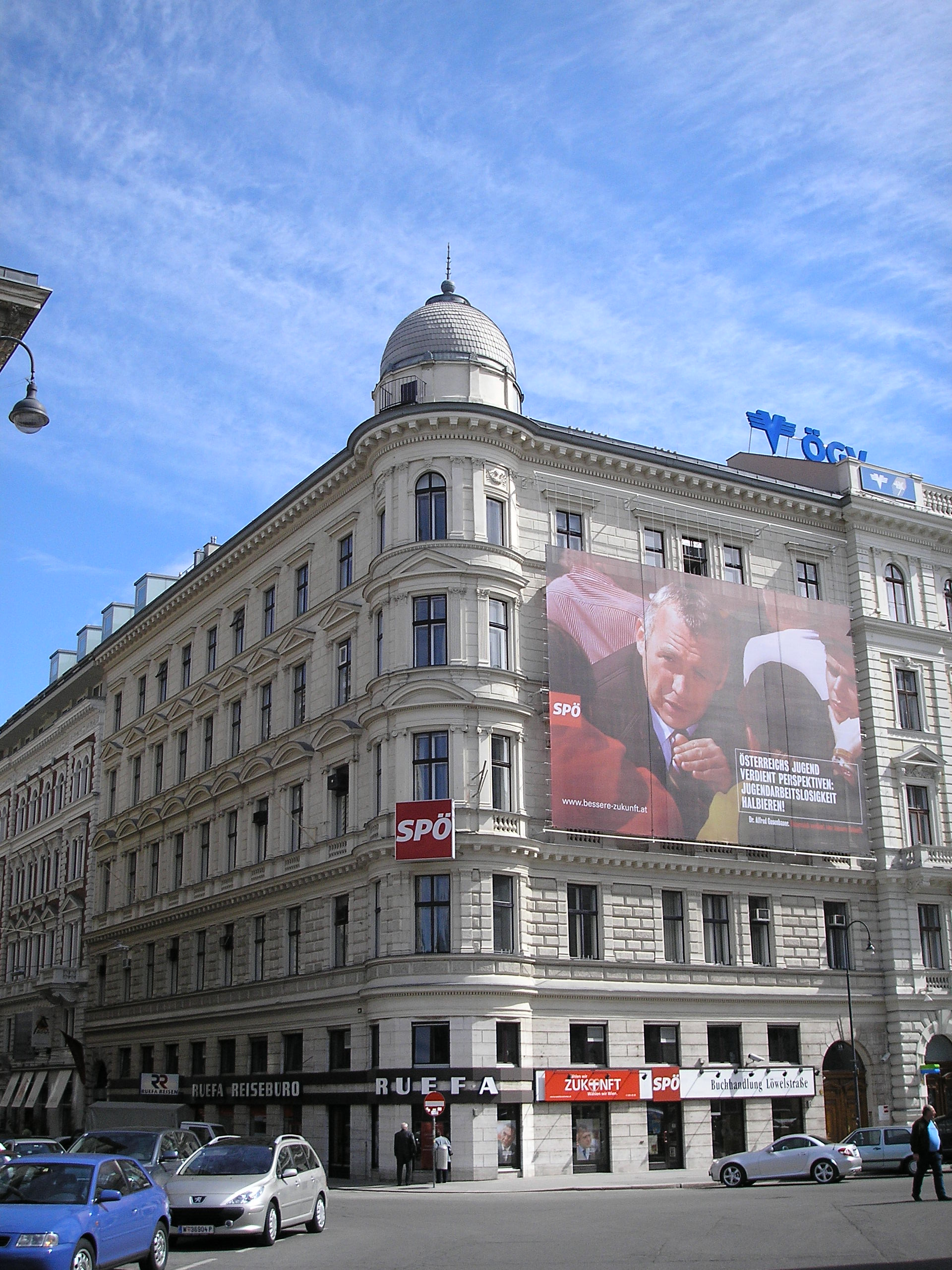
SPÖ party headquarters in Vienna

The grand coalition government with the conservative ÖVP as the junior partner would last from 1988 until 2000.

In July 1990, Bruno Kreisky, who was the grand doyen of the party, died. The end of the Cold War and the fall of the Iron Curtain confronted Austria and the SPÖ with changing realities. In October of the same year, the party won and remained strongest party in parliament. In June 1991, the party congress decided to change its name from the "Socialist Party of Austria" to the "Social Democratic Party of Austria" (Sozialdemokratische Partei Österreichs), thus shifting the emphasis from socialism to a reaffirmation to its commitment to social democracy.

On issues of gender equality, the party congress decided in June 1993 to introduce a quota for women. The new regulation required that at least 40% of SPÖ candidates are female.

Chancellor Vranitzky tried to repair the damage to Austria's international image caused by the presidential election of the controversial Kurt Waldheim. He was the first chancellor who, in a speech in front of parliament, clearly spoke of the guilt Austrians carried during the Second World War, something that was until then a topic that was taboo at home. He undertook a number of steps towards reconciliation with victims, his state visit to Israel in 1983 was highly regarded. The SPÖ also endorsed an entry of the country into the European Union during negotiations with Brussels. In the national referendum of 12 June 1994, over 66% percent of all voters voted "yes", Austria duly became a member of the European Union on 1 January 1995.

Although the SPÖ supported Austria's entry to the European Union, the party fared badly in the 1994 legislative election held in October 1994, but remained the strongest party in parliament. It was able to retain that position in the December elections of 1995 where it gained votes back. In 1997, Chancellor Vranitzky stepped back from office after more than 10 years in office to make way for the new generation, being replaced by his former Finance Minister Viktor Klima, who was sworn in during January. In April 1997 he also took over the position as party chairman.

The party congress decided on a reformed party programme in October 1998. The basic values of social democracy, freedom, equality, justice and solidarity were reaffirmed. But the party also committed itself to modernisation and a willingness to take risks and welcome change. A new, more open party statute was passed. In order to reflect the new reforms, a new party logo was also introduced.

== Problems with Proporz ==
The problem of the grand coalition in Austria was the continuation of the old Proporz system, where basically any political position as well as the civil service, trade unions and even positions in the economy and state businesses were occupied by either members of the two big parties. This system worked well in the post-war period, however with the end of the Cold War and Austria's entry to the EU, people's perceptions and opinions changed strongly. The old Proporz system, where basically the SPÖ and the ÖVP would divide everything up between them, was increasingly seen as outdated and even undemocratic. Because both parties always had an absolute majority in parliament, no effective opposition could ever exist. The long period of grand coalitions lasted for over a decade, a period that was very unusual for any western, parliamentary democracy.

As voters' frustration with the old system grew, the right-wing populist Freedom Party of Austria (FPÖ) under the young and dynamic party chairman Jörg Haider was able to ride the wave of discontent and win votes in every parliamentary election. The FPÖ had its core support with right-wing voters, but was increasingly able to attract voters from the conservative ÖVP and even made inroads with traditional SPÖ voters who grew fed up with the grand coalitions and the old Proporz system.

The 1999 legislative election was a great shock to the country's system. Although the SPÖ lost votes, it was still able to retain its position as the strongest party, but the FPÖ became the second strongest party by a very small margin ahead of the ÖVP. Although federal president Thomas Klestil gave the Social Democrats the order to form a new government, no coalition partner could be found. The ÖVP under their leader Wolfgang Schüssel, who was Vice-Chancellor of Austria and Foreign Minister, entered into negotiations with the FPÖ instead. In February 2000, the new right-wing coalition government between the ÖVP and the FPÖ was formed with Schüssel as the new chancellor. This prompted a huge outcry at home as well as abroad, leading even to sanctions by the EU and Israel pulling out its ambassador in protest against the far-right FPÖ. For the first time in 30 years, the SPÖ had to sit in opposition.

== New role as opposition party and return to power ==
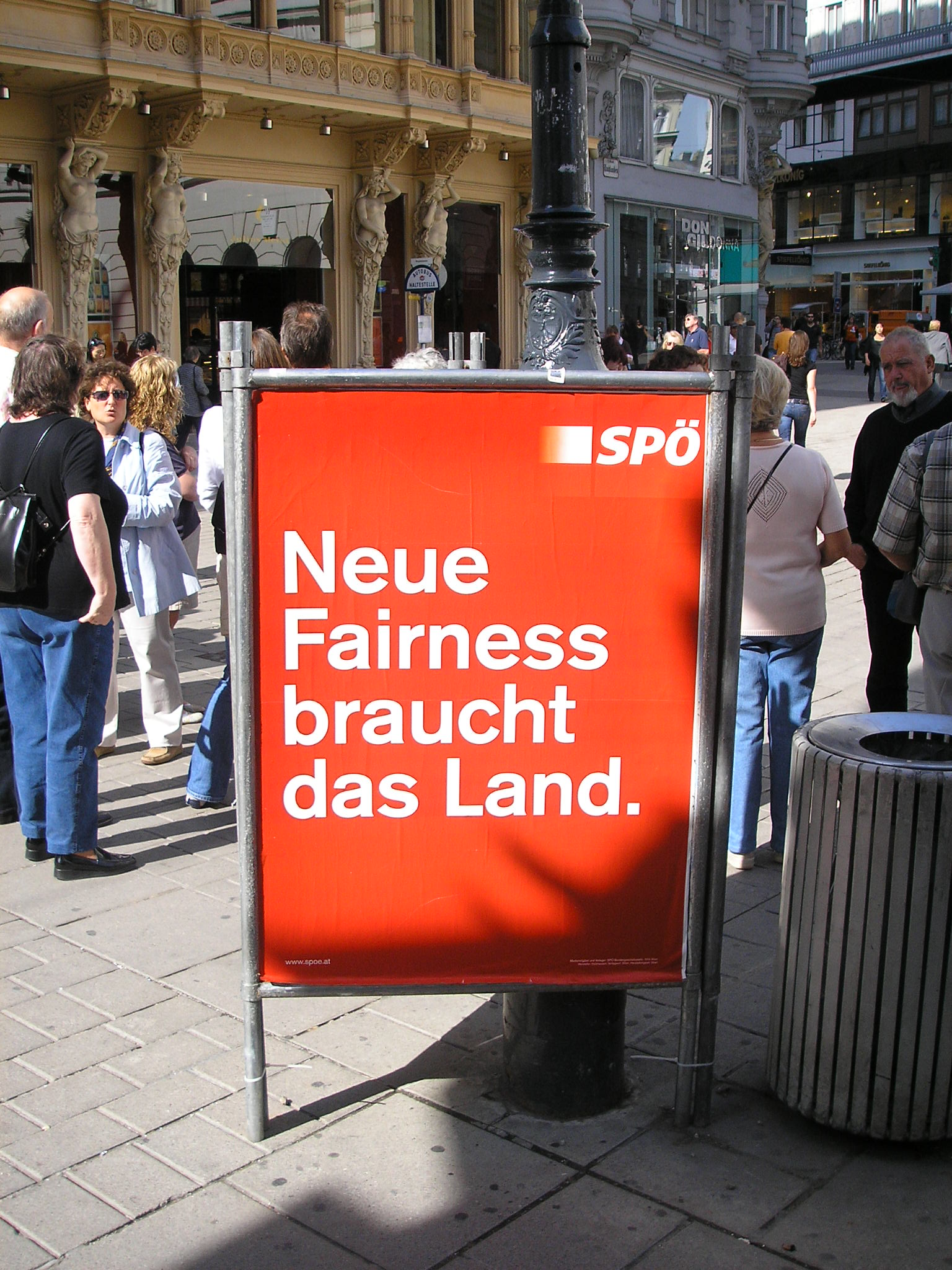
SPÖ poster for the 2006 general elections; "The country needs a new fairness."

The end of the grand coalition left many within the ÖVP embittered with their party and its perceived sell-out. Alfred Gusenbauer became new party chairman and started restructuring the party politically, organisationally and financially.

In the snap elections of November 2002 the party lost its position as strongest party to the conservative ÖVP, which won a resounding victory at the expense of the Social Democrats and the FPÖ. The SPÖ got 36.5% of the votes, ending up with 69 seats in the National Council. It had 23 seats in the Federal Council. Nevertheless, in a number of state elections, the SPÖ won an increased number of votes and even made inroads in traditionally conservative-ruled states. Outside its traditional strongholds of Vienna and Burgenland, the party surprisingly won state elections in Styria and Salzburg, forming the new state governments there.

SPÖ candidate Heinz Fischer won the presidential elections in April 2004 against ÖVP contender Benita Ferrero-Waldner. Thus an ÖVP-led government stood opposite a Social Democrat president. President Fischer repeatedly made statements that stood in contrast to the official stance of the government, such as the speaking out for the equality of homosexuals as well as calling for better treatment of immigrants.

In June 2004, the SPÖ fared well in the 2004 European elections, winning 33.5% of the Austrian votes cast and receiving nine seats (out of a total of 18 Austrian seats) and becoming the strongest Austrian party. This was seen as a welcome sign for the upcoming 2006 legislative election. Due to the banking scandal of the BAWAG, which was close to the unions, confidence has been greatly shaken that the party will separate financial dealings from politics.

In the 2006 National Elections the SPÖ, to the surprise of many, became Austria's strongest party with 68 seats (67 plus the chairman of the Liberal Forum running on the SPÖ electoral list) to the ÖVP's 66. In the long protracted coalition negotiations that followed, a grand coalition was formed with the ÖVP, with Gusenbauer as Chancellor. The government was finally sworn in January 2007, three months after the elections.

== See also ==
- Independent Social Democratic Party (Czech Lands)
