= Karl Ehn =

Austrian architect

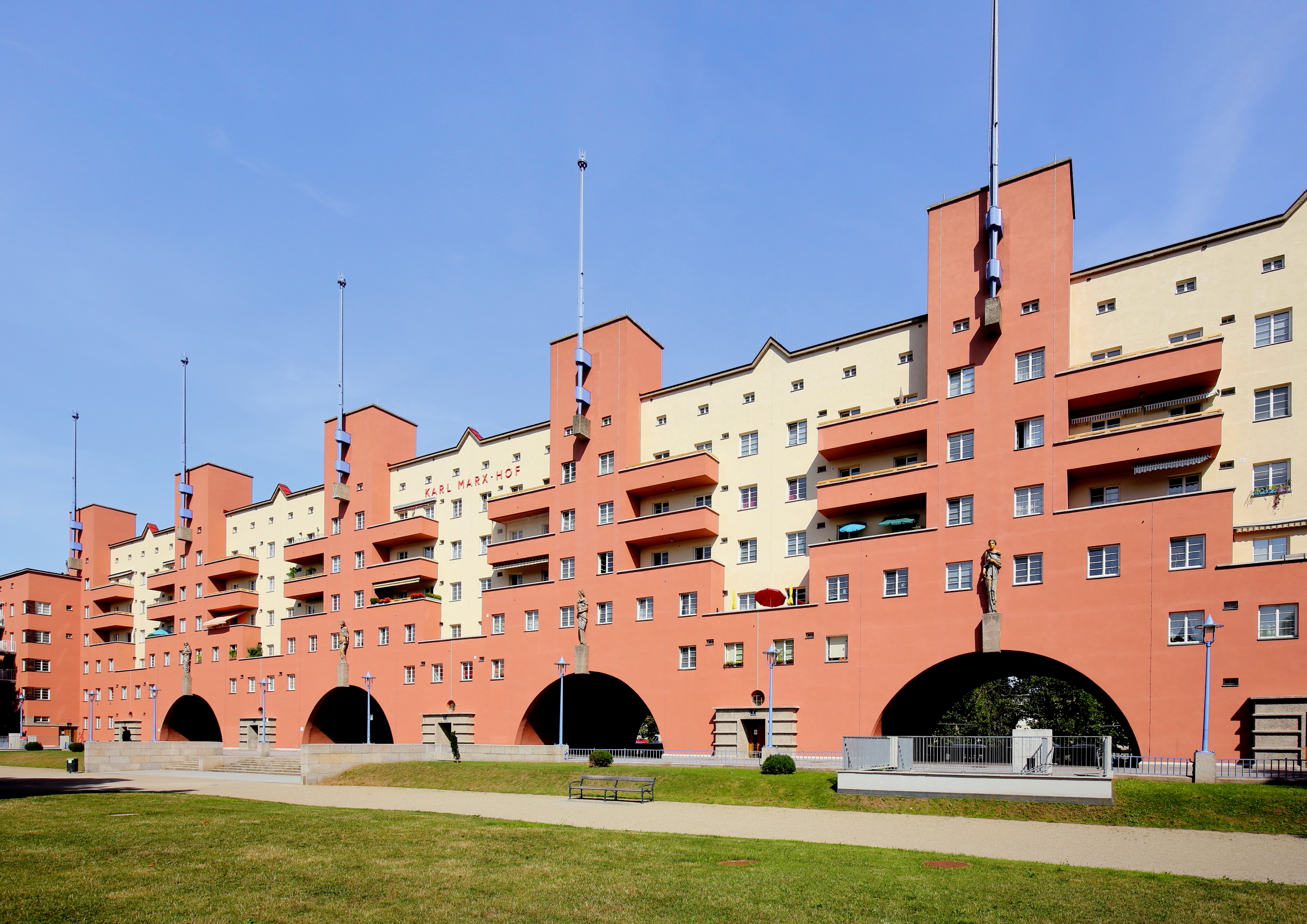
Karl Marx-Hof, as seen in 2015

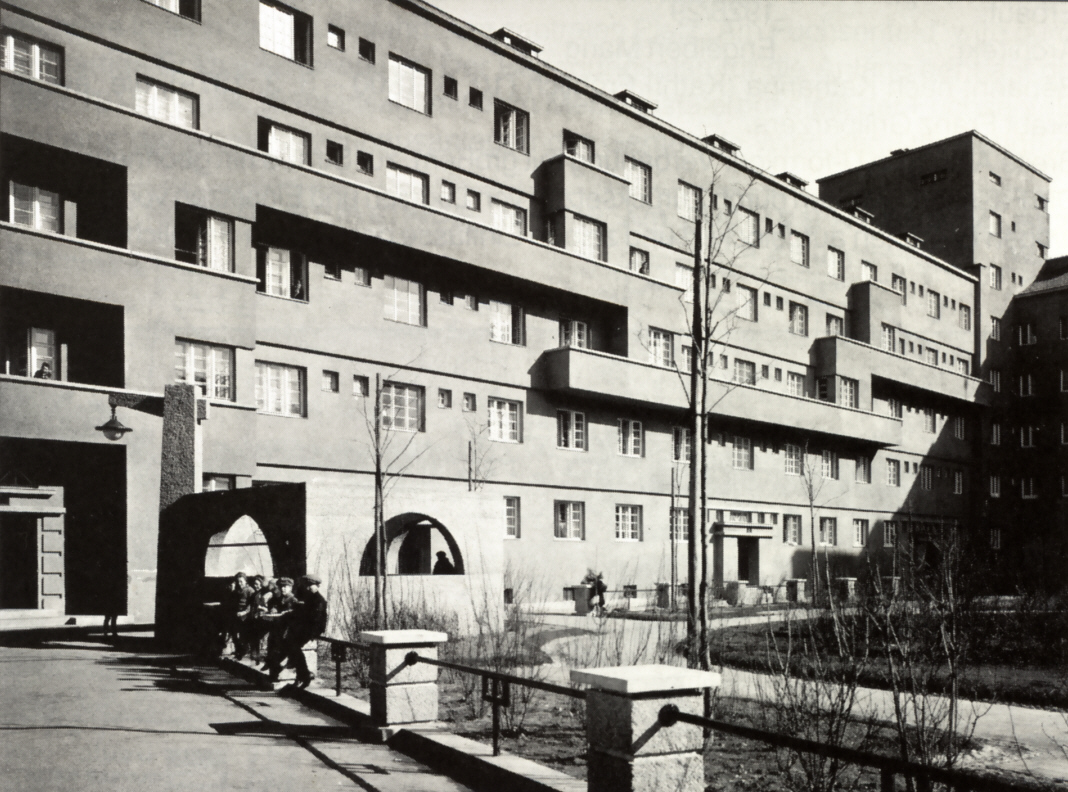
The Bebelhof development, 1930

Karl Ehn (1 November 1884 – 26 July 1957) was a Viennese architect and city planner.

== Biography ==
Ehn apprenticed under Otto Wagner, began working for the Vienna City Administration in 1908, and as City Architect of Vienna was responsible for many Gemeindebau (public housing projects) of the 1920s and 1930s. It is estimated that Ehn designed a total of 2,716 flats during his career.

Initially his designs were informed by the English Garden City movement as shown by his early commission at Hermewiese (1923). His most notable single design remains the colossal Karl Marx-Hof (1926-1930), the largest and best example of innovative public housing built during the Socialist Red Vienna movement.

According to Joseph Rykwert, Ehn continued to serve the city through the Anschluss in 1938 and afterwards until 1950.

== Work ==
Ehn's work in Vienna includes:

- Hermeswiese (1923)
- Lindenhof project (1924)
- Bebelhof (1925)
- Karl Marx-Hof, Heiligenstadt (1927)
- Adelheid-Popp-Hof (1932)
