= Austromarxism =

Worldview reconciling nationalism and social democracy with Marxism

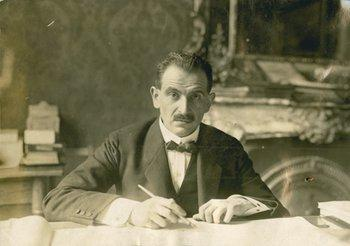
Austromarxist theorist Otto Bauer, photographed in 1919

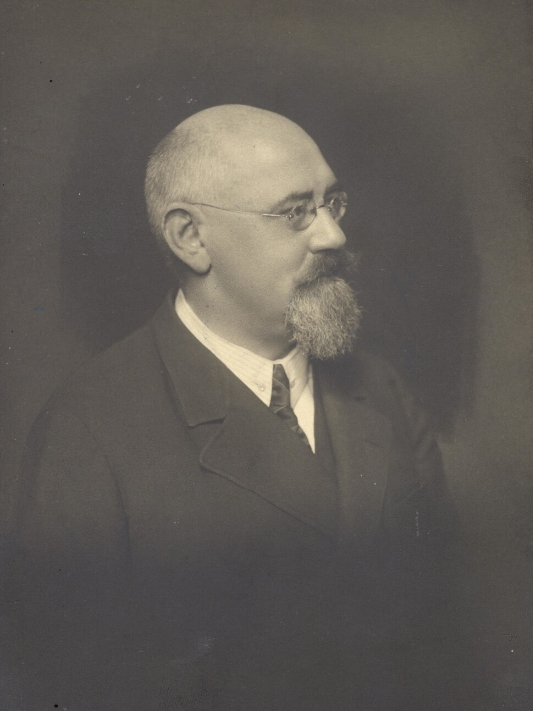
Former Staatkanzler Karl Renner, photographed in 1920

Austromarxism (also stylised as Austro-Marxism; German: Austromarxismus) was a Marxist theoretical current led by Victor Adler, Otto Bauer, Karl Renner, Max Adler and Rudolf Hilferding, members of the Social Democratic Workers' Party of Austria in Austria-Hungary and the First Austrian Republic.

It is known for its theory of nationality and nationalism, and its attempt to conciliate it with socialism in the imperial context. More generally, the Austromarxists strove to achieve a synthesis between social democracy and revolutionary socialism. Uniquely, Austromarxists posited that class consciousness in the working class could be achieved more organically through the maintenance of national autonomy, in contrast to the internationalist perspective and the notion of the party vanguard popular in orthodox Marxist circles elsewhere in Europe.

== Overview ==
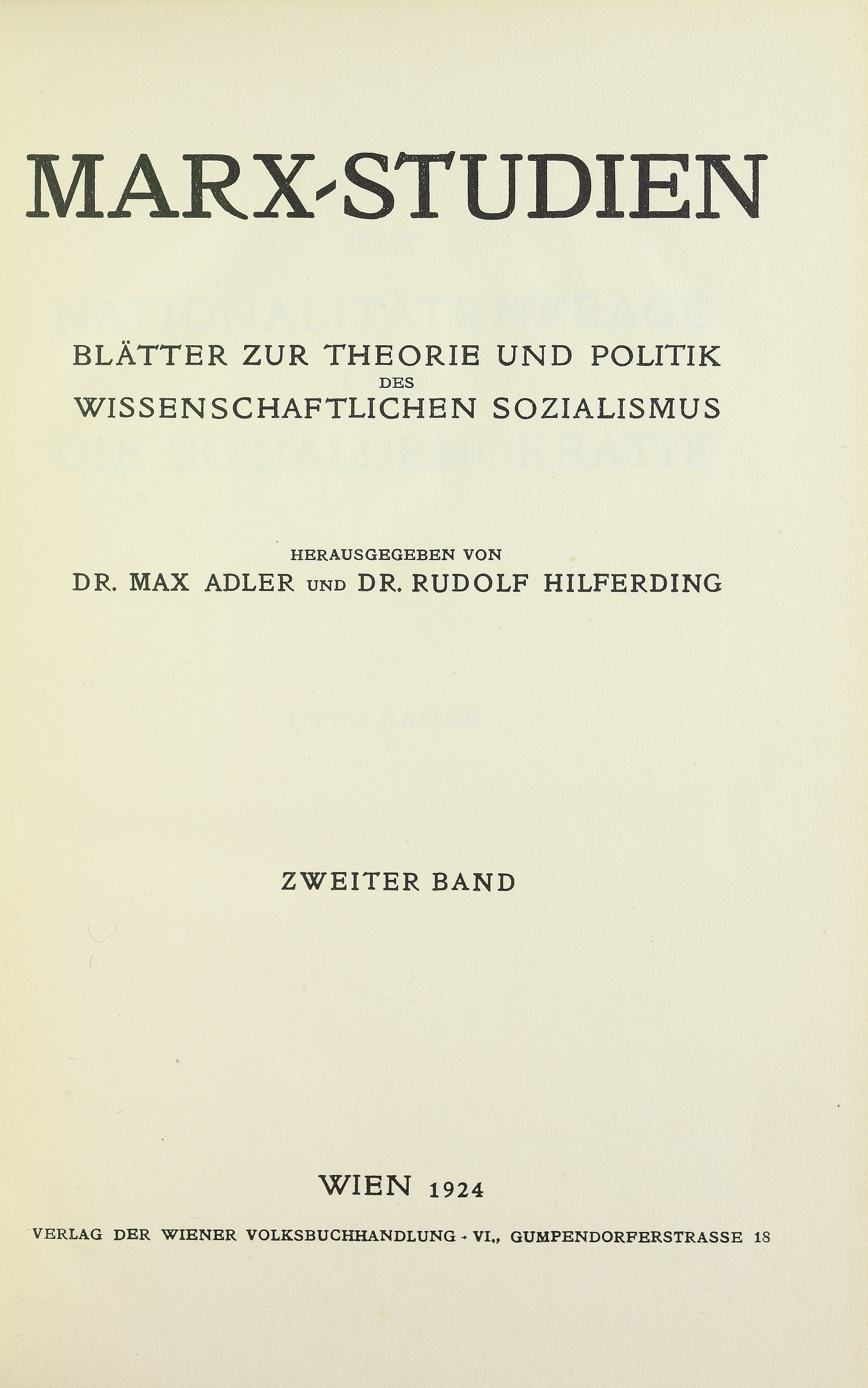
Cover of Marx-Studien magazine, 1924

Beginning in 1904, the Austromarxist group organized around magazines such as the Blätter zur Theorie und Politik des wissenschaftlichen Sozialismus and the Marx-Studien. Far from being a homogeneous movement, it was a home for such different thinkers and politicians as the Neokantian Max Adler and Rudolf Hilferding. These individuals shared common interests and regarded Marxism as an open, developing system but, in the words of Polish intellectual historian Leszek Kolakowski, did not constitute "a 'school' in the scholasic or rabbinic sense of a group of scholars acknowledging or professing a set of tenets by which they can be identified."

The term "Austromarxism" was first used by the American writer and Marxist theoretician Louis B. Boudin in 1914, on the eve of the first world war.

In 1921 the Austromarxists formed the International Working Union of Socialist Parties (also known as 2 1/2 International or the Vienna International), hoping to unite the 2nd and 3rd Internationals, with Friedrich Adler as the first secretary of the IWUSP. After it failed to maintain momentum as a force, the IWUSP was integrated with what remained of the Second International and formed the Labour and Socialist International (LSI).

Austromarxism, as the main political current within the SDAP, was responsible for guiding much of the municipal programs instituted by the SDAP-controlled Gemeinderat (English: Municipal Council) of Vienna in the years after the establishment of the First Austrian Republic. Under SDAP leadership, the capital city of Vienna instituted widespread economic and social reforms such as the introduction of widely available, publicly subsidized healthcare, a substantial number of municipal housing projects, and expansion of the educational system in Vienna, which during this time was known colloquially as Red Vienna, and which mirrored similar projects undertaken by the Social Democratic Party of Germany, the Scandinavians, and the British Labour Party, all of which were fellow member parties in the Labour and Socialist International.

In 1920, the SDAP-CSP coalition in the Austrian Nationalrat broke down, resulting in the SDAP losing its parliamentary majority in the 1920 Austrian legislative election, a loss from which the SDAP would not recover. From that point forward, the CSP maintained nearly unbroken control over the Nationalrat until it was suspended by CSP politician and Bundeskanzler Engelbert Dollfuß, who then radically transformed the political landscape and government of Austria between 1933 and 1934 from a conservative parliamentary democracy into a clericofascist single-party dictatorship under the rule of the Vaterländische Front, an authoritarian conservative political party. In the process, the SDAP was banned along with the Austrian branch of the NSDAP, which crippled the social democrat movement and Austromarxism as a whole. After the takeover by the Vaterländische Front, a brief Civil War ensued that ended with a defeat for the socialists.

The Austro-Marxist principle of national personal autonomy was later adopted by various parties, among them the Bund (General Jewish Labour Union), left-wing Zionists (Hashomer Hatzair) in favour of a binational solution in Palestine, the Jewish Folkspartei between the two world wars and the Democratic Union of Hungarians in Romania after 1989.

Some scholars hold the opinion that everything that Austrian socialists thought and published from 1900 to 1945 should be subsumed under the generic term "Austromarxism", that the term is more a description of origin in the sense of an Austrian school of scientific socialism rather than a clear basis of a common substantive school of thought.

== Ideology ==
Prior to the First World War and the subsequent collapse of the Austro-Hungarian monarchy, much of the Austromarxist body of thought was based upon the works of Karl Renner and Max Adler. In the later war years and especially after the foundation of the First Austrian Republic, the Austromarxist current rapidly began to shift into the orbit of Otto Bauer's political positions, particularly in regard to its negative relationship to the Bolshevik current predominant in the Third International and the concept of national identity abstracted from the territory. It was also influenced by contemporaneous intellectual trends, including the prominence of neo-Kantianism and positivism in philosophy and the emergence of marginalism in economics, and sought to confront questions around the rise of the interventionist state and the changing class-structure of early 20th century capitalist societies.

=== Nationalism and imperialism ===
Writing in the political treatise, Social Democracy and the Nationalities Question (1907), Bauer defined the nation as "the totality of men bound together through a common destiny into a community of character." Bauer's synthesis of the notion of nationhood with socialism was unusual in relation to the then-orthodox Marxist internationalist interpretation. The delineation between the two resides within Bauer's assertion that the national identity is not necessarily obstructive toward class consciousness, existing as a useful praxis for the self-determination of the worker. For Bauer, the problem lurking within national identity in the capitalist context was not the national identity itself so much as it was the tendency of peasants to cling to traditions that tethered them to the institutions of the old monarchical and capitalistic systems, as well as for nationality to be conceived of exclusively in racial and territorial means.

Bauer, desiring to explain how the notion of territorial principle could be substituted in cases where minority populations risked being subjugated by majorities, resurrected Karl Renner's notion of the "personal principle" as a way of gathering the geographically divided members of the same nation. In Social Democracy and the Nationalities Question (1907), Bauer wrote that "The personal principle wants to organize nations not in territorial bodies but in simple association of persons", thus radically disjoining the nation from the territory and making of the nation a non-territorial association. Bauer's position echoed earlier writings from Karl Renner, who expressed the importance of doing away with sub-national territorial identities as undemocratic and allowing for the oppression of non-majority populations within each nation.

Like other theorists operating within the Marxist umbrella, many of the prominent members of the Austromarxist current utilised a determinist perspective of history in the formation of their political critiques. Bauer in particular, regarded the phenomena of imperialism to be an inevitable and inescapable consequence of the evolution of capitalism, stating that "[imperialism] results from the insatiable and uncontrolled drive of capital to realize itself". However, Bauer asserted in Social Democracy and the Nationalities Question that a socialist society could rid itself of the possibility to be ruled by a foreign nation by democratizing the control of the military, which would necessarily entail wresting it from the hands of the controlling class.

=== Rejection of the Bolshevik model ===
The Bolshevik model of revolution, while initially bearing some weight within the SDAP, quickly fell out of favor as several major Austromarxist thinkers, most prominently Bauer, became concerned with the feasibility of such a revolution in Austria. Between 1918 and 1920, Bolshevik-style revolutions and governments were staged in Germany (both the German revolution and the Bavarian Soviet Republic) and Béla Kun's Hungarian Soviet Republic, all of which were either crushed or otherwise fell apart within the first several months of existence. Alerted by the collapse of these radical movements, Bauer and the others in the SDAP distanced themselves as much as possible from radical communist agitators, treating them with suspicion and, when possible, bringing the force of the judicial system down upon would-be revolutionaries.

Bauer specifically noted complications with the feasibility of the revolution in Austria that were not encountered by the Bolsheviks in 1917. The aggravation and consciousness of the peasants and the proletariats were distinct in a manner that caused the two interest groups to be diametrically opposed to one another. Among the peasants, the mass outrage that had stirred up over the course of the war was not due to the perceived manipulation of their livelihoods by a corrupt and evil structure of capitalism insofar as it was the dearth in cattle ownership that resulted from requisition efforts by the military over the course of the war. Moreover, influence of the Catholic Church was far more substantial in the provincial Alpine hinterlands than it was in the industrial center of Vienna, and the predominant bulk of the peasant class did not share the highly anticlericalist attitude nor the predilection toward the dispossession of private property held by the urban working class.

Additionally, unlike in the case of the October Revolution in Russia, the new First Austrian Republic was under close watch by the victorious Entente Powers that had dismantled the Austro-Hungarian Empire, and would likewise pose a credible threat of militarily intervening in the event that they suspected a violent revolution in Austria to be likely. Thus, Bauer dismissed any interest in pursuing the Bolshevik model of revolution in Austria on the basis that any such movement would both fail to defend itself militarily against intervention by external parties and to capture the mass support of both the urban working class and the agrarian rural peasant class, whose reactionary nature would be exceedingly difficult to overcome with rash action. As an alternative, Bauer saw the path of social democracy to be the most feasible method for the success of socialism in Austria. The ability to grant major and permanent concessions to the proletariat while avoiding an open civil conflict, which may have involved the military power of the Entente, granted the Austromarxists safer and more numerous opportunities for generating lasting transformations in the social and economic structure of Austrian society.

=== Role of the Party ===
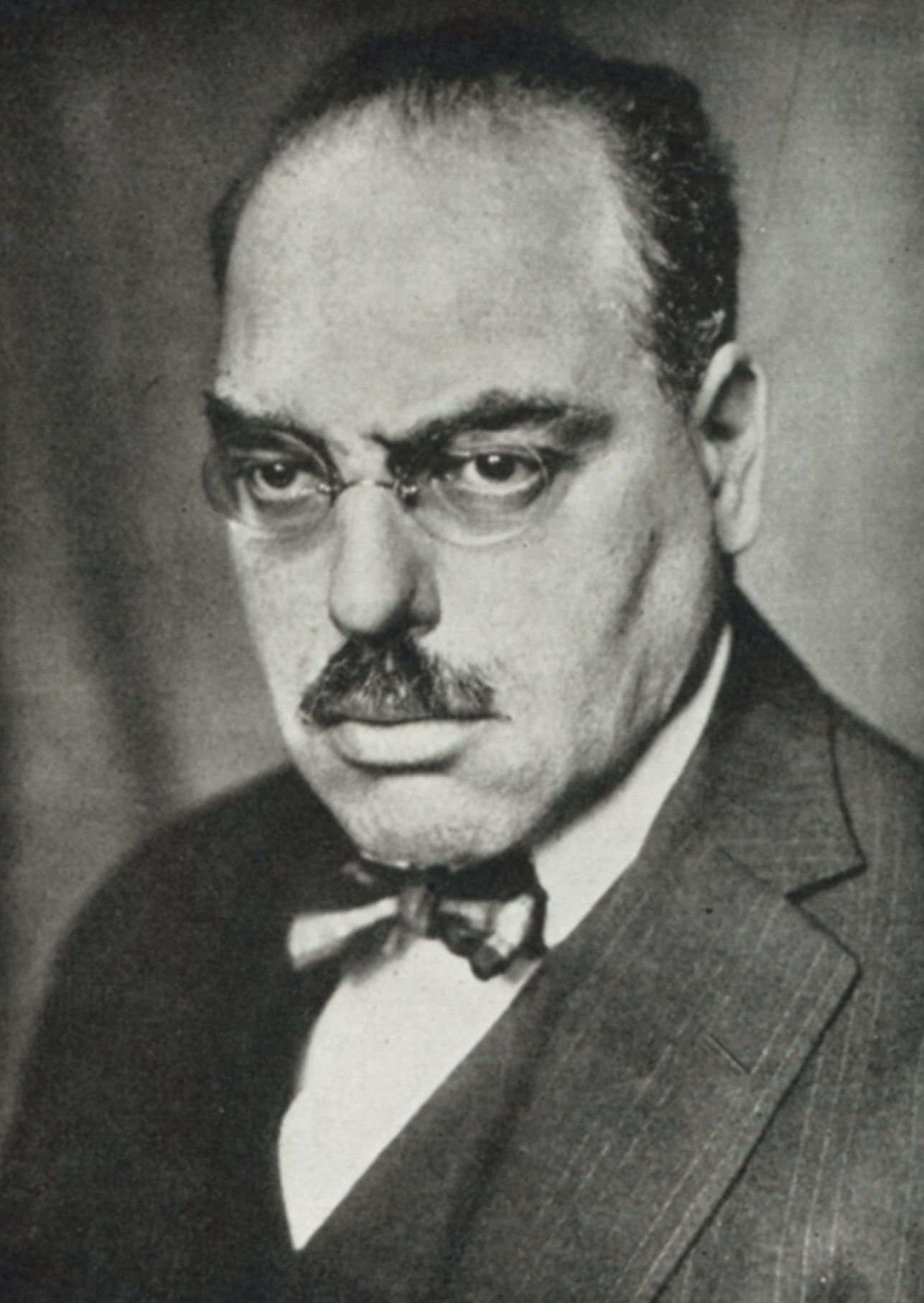
Rudolf Hilferding.

Bauer rejected elitism as a method for the dissemination of class consciousness, straying away from normative Bolshevik notion of the party vanguard. The embodiment of the revolution in the Bauerian thought was an organic movement that developed from a groundswell of working-class awakening and gradual transition toward socialism. Bauer's assertions were grounded in earlier writings by other Austromarxists who had written before him, such as Max Adler, who posited that "the cultural interests of the intellectuals, and the mere interests of the working class, as a self-enclosed class, have little in common except the very general claim for a humanly decent existence."

This departure from international socialist norms had been the consequence of the Austromarxists' desire to avoid creating what Gruber describes as a "the dictatorship of a caste over the masses." Paradoxically, the more normative Marxist structure of the core inner circle of educated urban intellectuals within the party had also developed in the SDAP well before the end of the war and remained at the center of party politics, reflecting a gap between the ideological persuasions of SDAP leadership and the party's behavior in practice that often manifested in other circumstances, such as with the relative lack of concern toward insufficient housing until the housing crisis in postwar Vienna necessitated the introduction of substantial construction projects.

=== Humanism ===
In contrast with the Lenin school of Marxism, which appealed to class-interest in the name of class war rather than to intellectual principles independent of class, the Austrian Marxists took in opposite view, in the estimation of Leszek Kolakowski. Instead, the Austromarxists attempted an intellectual appeal to all rational people of whatever class, stressing a moral universality in Marxism.

He summarized the essentially humanistic appeal of the Austrians:

"To be a Marxian socialist it was sufficient to think aright and to respect humane values that were not those of any particular class but would be embodied most perfectly in socialism.... They regarded Marxism as the continuation of the 'natural' development of social knowledge, and socialism as the 'natural interpretation of human values in terms of present-day society."

Rather than viewing Marxism as a tool for the proletariat and its intellectual leaders to rally their forces and muster their allies in order to politically annihilate their adversaries, Kolakowski indicated that the Austromarxists, "while accepting the principle of the class struggle, believed that everyone who took seriously the ideals of liberty, equality, and fraternity must, to be consistent with himself, adopt a socialist attitude whatever his own class-interests."

== Relationship with the Internationals ==
During the First World War, the relationship between various social democratic member parties of the Second International grew strained, as member parties of opposing nations involved in the conflict that espoused support for their respective countries could no longer cooperate. Following the war, two divergent currents within the Broad Left attempted to restore the unification of the international worker movements. In 1919, the more hardline Third International was established with support from the Bolsheviks in Russia. As a response to the Third International, Friedrich Adler took part in founding the '2 1/2 International', formally named the International Working Union of Socialist Parties, as the IWUSP's first secretary in 1921.

The IWUSP represented a general alignment of social democratic parties that leaned away from the Bolshevik current, having grown initially out of a wartime pacifist bloc of the Second International. Other members of the Austromarxist movement, including Bauer and Hilferding, backed the IWUSP over the Third International, considering the Bolshevik model to be undesirable or unworkable in Austria. Despite general support from social democratic parties in Switzerland, France, Germany, and Italy (in addition to the Austromarxists' own SDAP), the IWUSP failed its objective of bridging the divide between the competing Internationals. After confidence and momentum in the IWUSP was lost following the German delegation's withdrawal under pressure from Third International chairman Grigory Zinoviev, the IWUSP merged in 1923 with what was left of the Second International to form the Labour and Socialist International, with Friedrich Adler again leading as secretary.

== End of the First Republic ==
The rise of the agrarian Fatherland Front was in part the consequence of the SDAP's failure to generate substantial momentum for the party outside of Vienna. The dichotomy of rural Catholic Austria and the urbanised, educated elite of Vienna generated distrust among the rural working class due to perceptions of the Austromarxist cause having deteriorated and, additionally, due to the rise of similar nationalistic political forces in Germany at the time, which had similarly pivoted the rural working-class vote against the left movements of urban centres like Berlin. Owing in part to the collapse of Austromarxism in Vienna was the inaction of SDAP leadership to counteract the growing forces of the Austrian right, paralleling failures by the SDP in Germany to likewise undermine the growth of the NSDAP.

The growing political gap between rural Austria and the capital was exacerbated by the radicalising influence of the Catholic Church against socialism. Minimal economic opportunities for rural Austrian provinces such as Steiermark and Vorarlberg to pursue industrialisation, which further perpetuated the rural-urban divide in Austrian society, can be considered a primary reason for the failure of the SDAP to penetrate the Austrian hinterland. Consequently, Engelbert Dollfuss was awarded the Chancellorship in 1932, and by 1934 the Austromarxist project in Vienna had been fully unravelled, the SDAP banned nationwide in Austria, and most of the party's leadership and active membership had been placed either in exile or in prison.

== Bibliography ==
- Bauer, Otto (2000). Nimni, Ephraim J. (ed.). The Question of Nationalities and Social Democracy. Translated by O'Donnell, Joseph. Minneapolis & London: University of Minnesota Press. ISBN 978-0-8166-3265-7.. Originally published in German as Die Nationalitätenfrage und die Sozialdemokratie. Vienna: Verlag der Wiener Volksbuchhandlung Ignaz Brand, 1907. OCLC 697615971 (all editions).
- Czerwińska-Schupp, Ewa (2005). Otto Bauer: Studien zur Social-Politischen Philosophie [Otto Bauer: Studies in Social-Political Philosophy] (in German). Frankfurt: Peter Lang. ISBN 9783631521731.
- Krätke, Michael R. (1997). "Otto Bauer (1881-1938): Die Mühen des Dritten Wegs Die Linke [Otto Bauer (1881-1938): The Trouble of the Left's Third Way]". spw – Zeitschrift für sozialistische Politik und Wirtschaft. No. 97: 55–59. Also available in PDF format.
- Leser, Norbert (1968). Zwischen Reformismus und Bolschewismus. Der Austromarxismus als Theorie und Praxis [Between Reformism and Bolshevism: Austromarxism in Theory and Practice]. Vienna; Frankfurt; Zürich: Europa-Verlag. OCLC 611302516.
- Loew, Raimund (November–December 1979). The Politics of Austro-Marxism (subscription required). New Left Review. No. I/118.
- Máiz, Ramón; Pereira, María (8 June 2020). "Otto Bauer: The Idea of Nation as a Plural Community and the Question of Territorial and Non-Territorial Autonomy". Filozofija i Društvo. Vol. 31, No. 3: 287–300. doi:10.2298/FID2003287M.
- Otto Bauer - Austromarxismus und Internationale zweieinhalb [Otto Bauer - Austromarxism and the Second-and-a-Half International]. Last accessed 2021-09-02.
- Mark E. Blum, William Smaldone (2015) Austro-Marxism: Austro-Marxist Theory and Strategy
- Mark E. Blum (2017) Austro-Marxism: The Ideology of Unity
