= Red Vienna =

1918–34 socialist period in Vienna

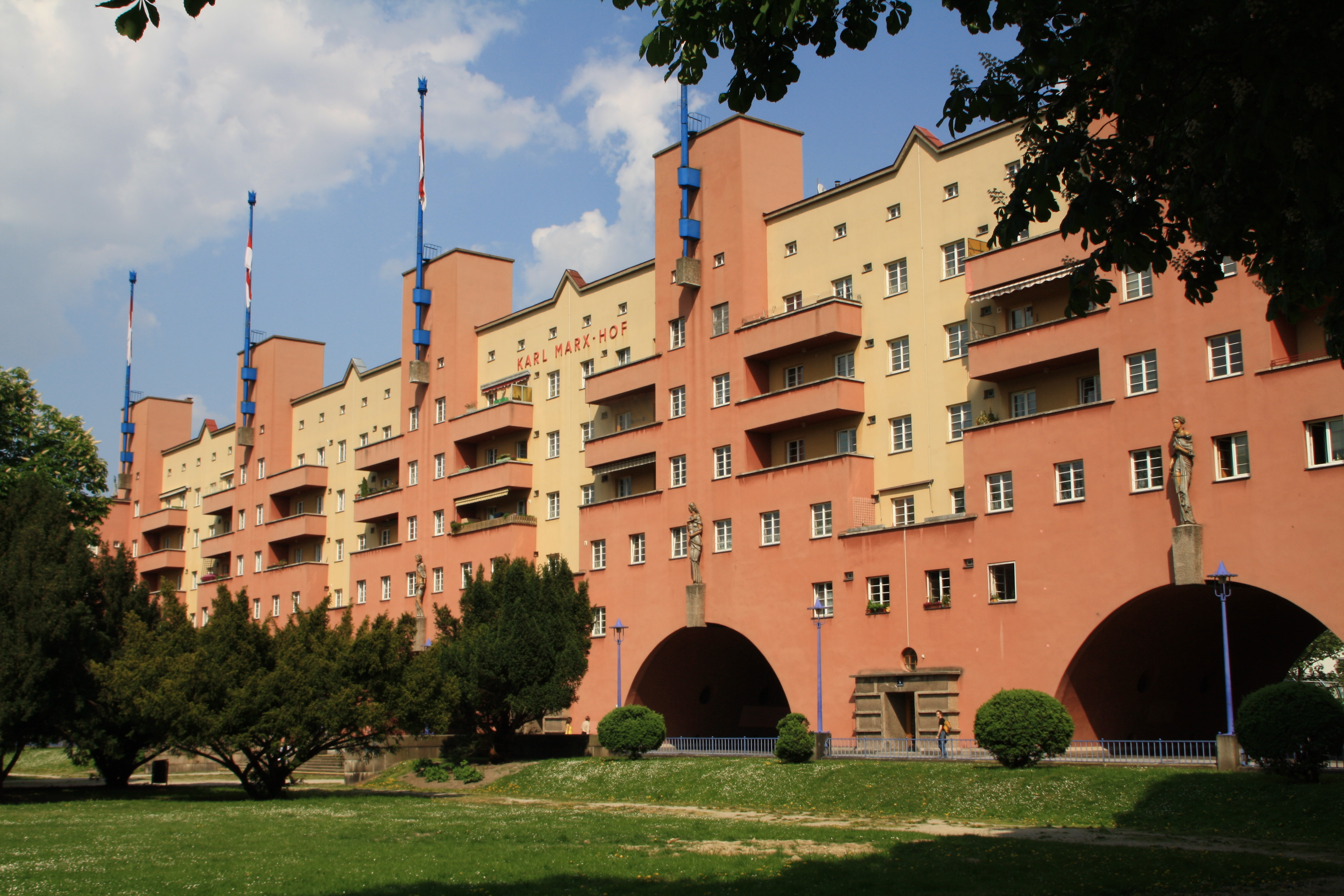
Karl-Marx-Hof in Döbling, Vienna (2009). The Gemeindebau was constructed between 1927 and 1933 during the Red Vienna period.

Red Vienna (German: Rotes Wien) was the colloquial name for the capital of Austria between 1918 and 1934, during which the Social Democratic Workers' Party of Austria (SDAP) maintained near-total political control over Vienna (and for a short time, over Austria as a whole). During this time, the SDAP pursued a rigorous program of construction projects across the city in response to severe housing shortages. This involved implementing policies to improve public education, healthcare, and sanitation, while attempting to create the architectural foundation for a new socialist lifestyle.

The collapse of the First Austrian Republic in 1934 after the suspension of the Nationalrat by Bundeskanzler Engelbert Dollfuß a year earlier, and the subsequent banning of the SDAP in Austria, brought an end to the period of the first socialist project in Vienna. Many of the housing complexes built during this period, known in German as Gemeindebauten, still survive today.

== History ==
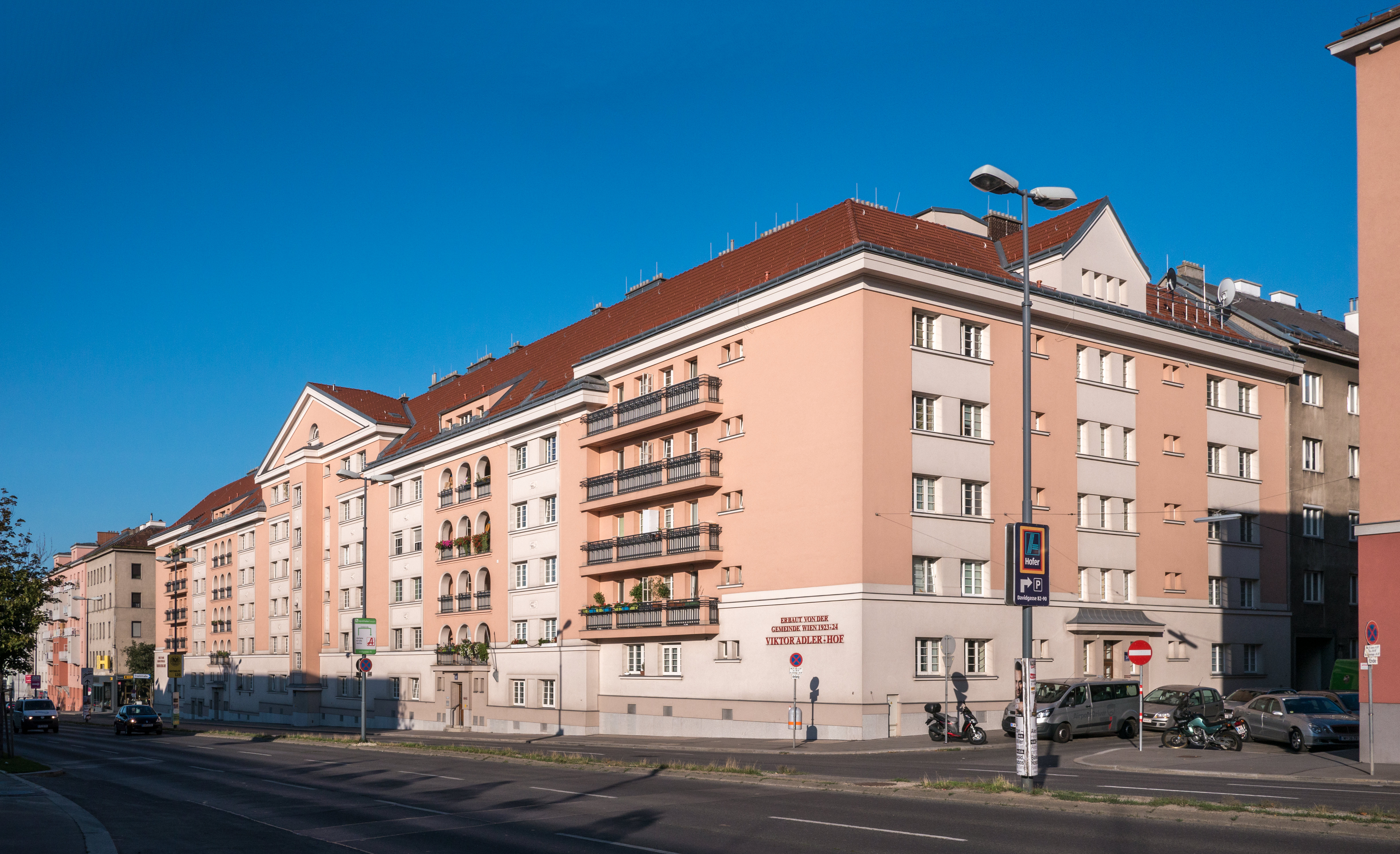
Viktor-Adler-Hof

After the defeat of the Austro-Hungarian Empire in World War I, the Treaty of Saint-Germain-en-Laye was signed between the Empire and the victorious Entente, which stipulated the complete disassembly of the component lands of the Empire into individual nations. Austrian control was reduced to the rump Republic of German-Austria, officially proclaimed on 12 November 1918. During the war, the German current within the Social Democrats expressed an interest in the idea of Mitteleuropa proposed by the pan-Germanic nationalist movement within Austria, hoping that a union (Anschluß) with the rest of Germany could stymie some of the major economic problems the new republic was beginning to face.

To the disheartenment of the Social Democrats and pan-Germanic nationalists alike, the Treaty of Saint-Germain-en-Laye expressly forbade any future union with the newly founded Weimar Republic, leaving Austria with little territory and limited access to the Hungarian breadbasket that had fed Vienna for decades. In Vienna's 4 May 1919 Gemeinderat (Municipal Council) elections, the SDAP gained a majority of seats, with the office of the Mayor of Vienna won by SDAP politician Jakob Reumann. Nationally, the success of the SDAP was far less pronounced; it won only 43.4% of the seats (40.8% of the popular vote) necessitating a coalition government with the conservative Christian Social Party (CSP), an uncomfortable accommodation from which the SDAP would never fully recover. During the Gemeinderat elections of 4 May 1919, for the first time in Austrian history, all adult citizens of both sexes had voting rights. The Social Democrats elected prominent Austromarxist and SDAP member Karl Renner as the interim Staatskanzler, but after the national elections in 1920 concluded with the CSP candidate Michael Mayr succeeding Renner in his position, the SDAP did not manage to elect another national-level leader for the remainder of the First Republic's existence.

Vienna underwent a host of demographic changes that exacerbated the economic issues in the city in the years during and immediately after the war. Refugees from Austrian Galicia, including roughly 25,000 Jews seeking to avoid the political and antisemitic violence of the Russian Civil War that had spread to the area, had settled in the capital city. At the end of the war, many former soldiers of the Imperial and Royal Army came to stay in Vienna, while many former Imperial-Royal government ministry officials returned to their native lands, creating a large exchange of various ethnic populations in and out of Vienna in the years that followed.

The middle classes, many of whom had bought war bonds that were now worthless, were plunged into poverty by hyperinflation. New borders between Austria and the nearby regions rendered food supply difficult by cutting off the city from lands that had traditionally fed it for centuries. Existing apartments were overcrowded, and diseases such as tuberculosis, the Spanish flu, and syphilis raged. In the new Austria, Vienna was considered a capital much too big for the small country, and often called Wasserkopf (en: "big head") by people living in other parts of the country.

On the other hand, optimists saw the dire postwar situation as an opportunity for great sociopolitical transformation. Pragmatic intellectuals like Hans Kelsen, who drafted the republican constitution, and Karl Bühler applied themselves to this work. For them it was a time of awakening, of new frontiers and of optimism.

The intellectual resources of Red Vienna were remarkable. Socialist intellectuals like Ilona Duczyńska and Karl Polanyi relocated to Vienna, joining the city's native Sigmund Freud, Alfred Adler, Karl Bühler, Arthur Schnitzler, Karl Kraus, Ludwig Wittgenstein, Adolf Loos, Arnold Schoenberg and Vienna's many other scientists, artists, publishers and architects. Intellectuals of conservative persuasions, such as radical Catholic nationalists Joseph Eberle, Hans Eibl, and Johannes Messner, also lived within the SDAP-run capital over the course of the First Republic's existence.

Recalling the period, Polanyi wrote in 1944:

"Vienna achieved one of the most spectacular cultural triumphs of Western history … an unexampled moral and intellectual rise in the condition of a highly developed industrial working class which, protected by the Vienna system, withstood the degrading effects of grave economic dislocation and achieved a level never reached before by the masses of the people in any industrial society."

However, SDAP rule in Vienna and influence throughout Austria did not go unopposed. Despite the best efforts on the part of the Social Democrats to exert influence on academic institutions and the intellectual cliques inside and outside Vienna, the much greater influence of conservative Catholic “Blacks” in these institutions was never subdued. The Catholic Church itself was hardly uprooted from its role as the primary spiritual force in Austria; even amongst the working class of Vienna, the Church was at most removed from some elements of city policy, but its enduring influence through social programs, holidays and religious worship continued throughout SDAP rule.

John Gunther characterized the overall setting of interwar Vienna as: "The disequilibrium between Marxist Vienna and the clerical countryside was the dominating Motiv of Austrian politics until the rise of Hitler. Vienna was socialist, anti-clerical, and, as a municipality, fairly rich. The hinterland was poor, backward, conservative, Roman Catholic, and jealous of Vienna's higher standard of living."

== General politics ==
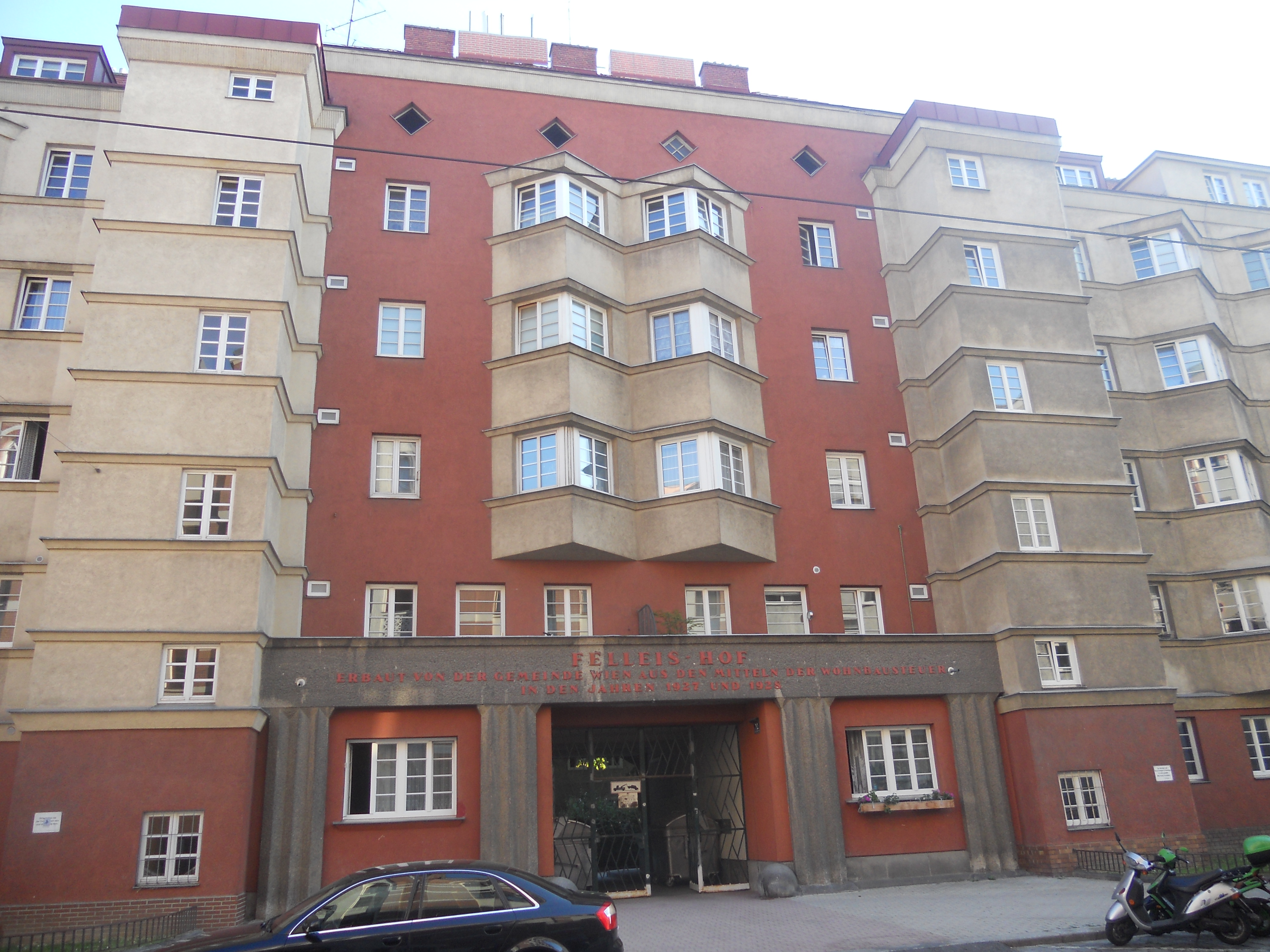
Felleishof

Initiatives of the SDAP-CSP coalition in the first government of the new Republic of German-Austria resulted in the legal introduction of the eight-hour day, only one week after the republic's proclamation in November 1918. Furthermore, an unemployment benefit system was implemented and the Kammer für Arbeiter und Angestellte (transl. Chamber of Workers, colloquially Arbeiterkammer) was founded by law as the workers' official lobby. The enthusiasm for such reforms became smaller and smaller within the CSP in the following two years, particularly after an attempted putsch by more radical Communist elements in Vienna on 15 June 1919. The CSP lost confidence in the coalition, and subsequently aligned with the pan-Germanic GDVP.

In 1920, the SDAP-CSP coalition broke down, resulting in the SDAP losing its parliamentary majority in the 1920 Austrian legislative election, a loss from which the SDAP would not recover. The SDAP continued to govern the City of Vienna, where they won a comfortable absolute majority in the 1919 elections. Their goal was to make Vienna a shining example of social democratic politics, and their ensuing reforms attracted great attention from the whole of Europe. Conservatives in Austria were heavily opposed, but were at that time unable to counter the success of the Social Democrats in Vienna elections.

Vienna had been the political center of Lower Austria for seven centuries. In the decades preceding the collapse of the monarchy, a substantial industrial base had built up in and around the cities of Vienna and Wiener Neustadt. With their strong majority in Vienna and the workers' votes in the industrial region around Wiener Neustadt, the SDAP successfully threw their weight behind the election of Albert Sever as the first democratically elected governor (Landeshauptmann) of Lower Austria in 1919. After the collapse of the relationship between the SDAP and CSP in 1920, the rural provincial areas of Lower Austria did not want to be tied to a provincial Social Democratic political machine, just as the socialists in Vienna did not want to be held back by a provincial territory they had long regarded as a dilutive force on their proper representation. Therefore, the two major parties soon agreed to separate "Red Vienna" from "Black Lower Austria". The national parliament passed the constitutional laws to enable this in 1921; on January 1, 1922, Vienna was re-organised into the ninth federal state.

After 1934, Gunther commented: "In Vienna the socialists produced a remarkable administration, making it probably the most successful municipality in the world. [...] The achievements of the Vienna socialists were the most exhilarating social movement of the post-war period in any European country. Result: the clericals bombed them out of existence."

== Policies ==
=== Public housing ===
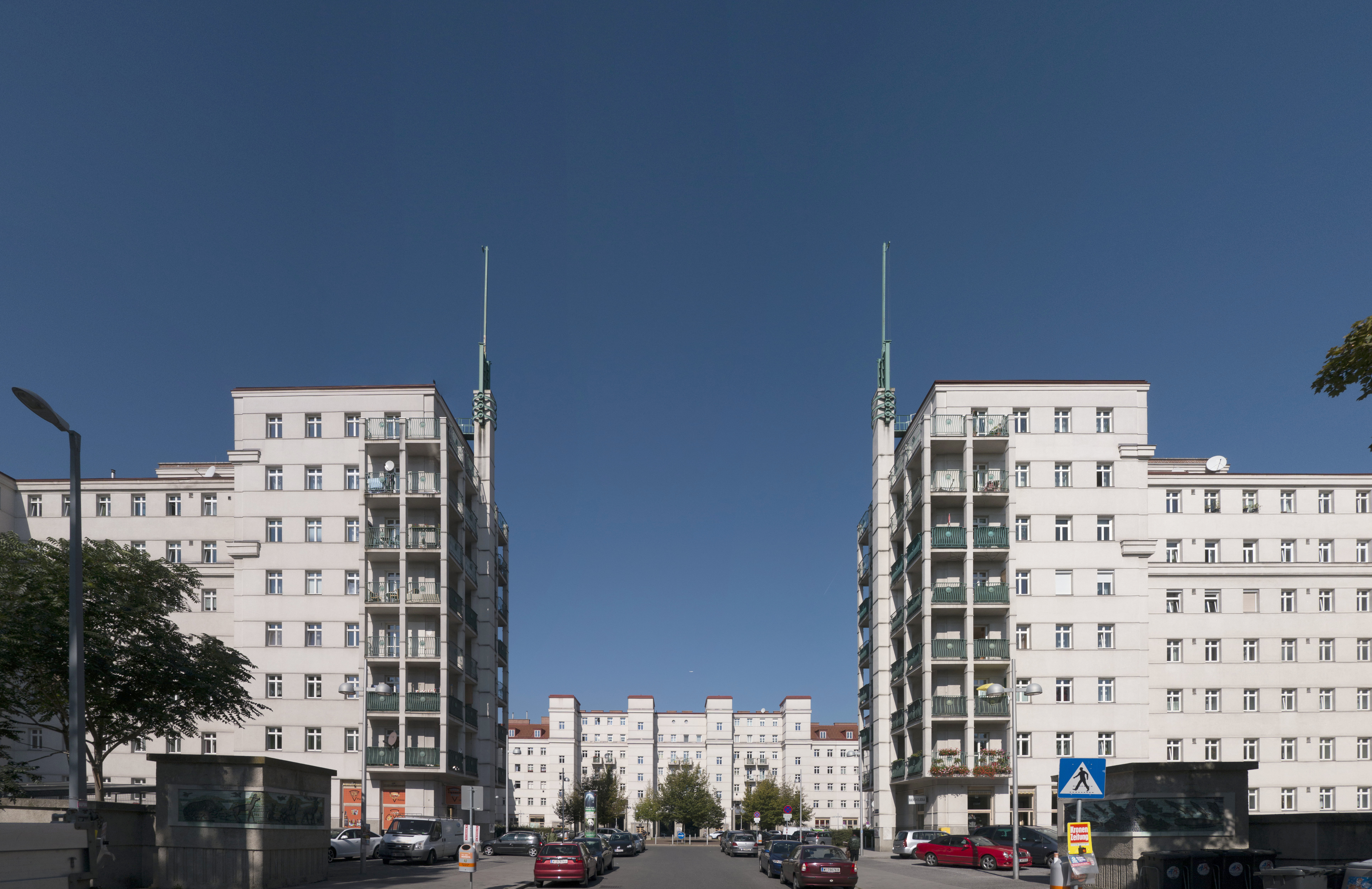
Wohnhausanlage Friedrich-Engels-Platz, built between 1930 and 1933

Prior to the founding of the First Republic, the Austromarxist current within the SDAP had largely set aside the problem of public housing, viewing it as solvable only with the victory of socialism. Nonetheless, since it was the most pressing issue facing the Gemeinderat after the war, the SDAP was forced to start initiatives to address it. The Imperial-Royal Government had passed a Mieterschutzgesetz ("Tenant Protection Act”) in 1917 which was applied in Vienna immediately. Despite ongoing high inflation, the act ordered apartment rents to be frozen at their 1914 level. This made new private housing projects unprofitable. Therefore, after the war, demand for affordable apartments grew enormously. Creating public housing projects became the main concern of the Social Democrats in Vienna.

In 1919, the Wohnunganforderungsgesetz (“Housing Requirement Act”) was passed in the federal parliament with the intention to ease pressure on the housing situation in Vienna. Low private demand for building land and low building costs proved favorable for the city administration's extensive public housing plans.

From 1925 to 1934, more than 60,000 new apartments were built in the Gemeindebau ("Municipal building") buildings. Large blocks were situated around green courts, for instance at the Karl-Marx-Hof. The tenants of these apartments were chosen on the basis of a ranking system in which persons with disabilities and other societally vulnerable groups got priority. Forty percent of building costs were taken from the proceeds of the Vienna Housing Tax, the rest from the proceeds of the Vienna Luxury Tax and from federal funds. Using public money to cover building costs allowed the rents for these apartments to be kept low. The number of Viennese citizens without homes living in shelters tripled to 80,000 between 1924 and 1934, but the city's building program housed as many as 200,000 people, a tenth of the population. Tenant protection legislation under the Social Democrats also ensured that (as noted by one observer) many more families were able to afford their own apartments without having to rely on relatives or subtenants.”

=== Social and health services ===
The Austromarxists of the SDAP sought an holistic transformation of the social and physical lives of the Viennese population. They sought increased standards for sanitation, quality of life improvements through newly created public facilities, and targeted major public health concerns. These new programs were primarily managed by the newly appointed Julius Tandler, a University of Vienna professor and doctor, and close associate of numerous figures within the SDAP. Several welfare institutions were established, including a baby clothing package, the school medical service and the child reception center. Many of the programs were substantial in scope, requiring several years to roll out on a large scale.

Propaganda posters published by the Gemeinderat in 1931 referenced programs that had distributed 53,000 Säuglingspakete (en: "clothing packages") to parents in need, with the stated goal that “Kein Wiener Kind darf auf Zeitungspapier geboren werden” (en: "No child in Vienna shall be born upon newspaper”). The total number of kindergartens was increased fivefold, after-school centers were established to offer children activities, subsidised lunches at schools were introduced, and medical and dental examinations were offered by the schools at no cost to the families of enrolled children. Public baths were constructed to support hygienic standards. Infant mortality dropped below 50% of pre-war levels, and cases of tuberculosis were slightly reduced.

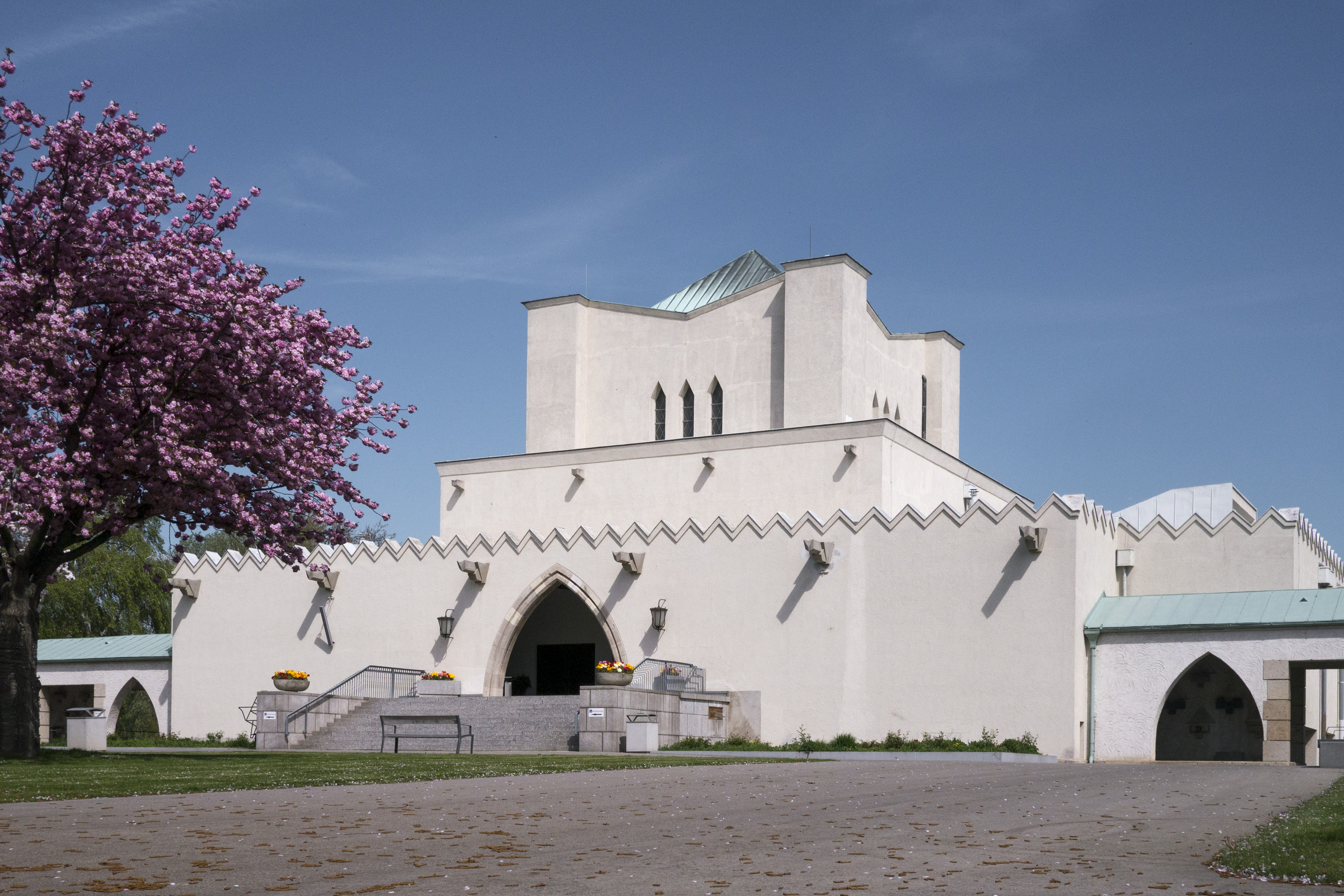
Feuerhalle Simmering

In 1921, the SDAP majority Gemeinderat of Vienna approved the construction of the Feuerhalle Simmering at the behest of several advocacy groups, most notably the "Workers' Cremation Association" and the magazine Die Flamme (en: “The Flame”). The opening of the crematorium in 1923 quickly grew into a flashpoint in the cultural struggle between the SDAP and CSP.

The CSP-led national government under Bundeskanzler Ignaz Seipel, pressured by the Catholic Church, ordered the then-Mayor of Vienna Karl Seitz to cease operations at the facility. Seitz refused, taking the stance that he was obligated to enforce the wishes of the Gemeinderat and Bundesland of Vienna.

Seipel, who earned a reputation for virulent anti-Semitism prior to his election in 1923, held steadfast to the belief that the Jewish population of Vienna, as well as the Jewish members in the ranks of the SDAP (not least among them Julius Tandler, then the health councillor and head of the ‘Welfare Department’ for the city of Vienna that had backed the crematorium's opening), were intending to subvert the Catholic mores that had governed Austrian life for centuries prior. After the CSP brought suit against the Bundesland of Vienna over the continued operation of the crematorium, Seitz was forced to defend his insubordination against the federal administration in the Constitutional Court. The court sided with the Vienna state government in 1924 in one of the rare few victories the SDAP was able to score against the powerful Catholic faction.

=== Financial policies ===
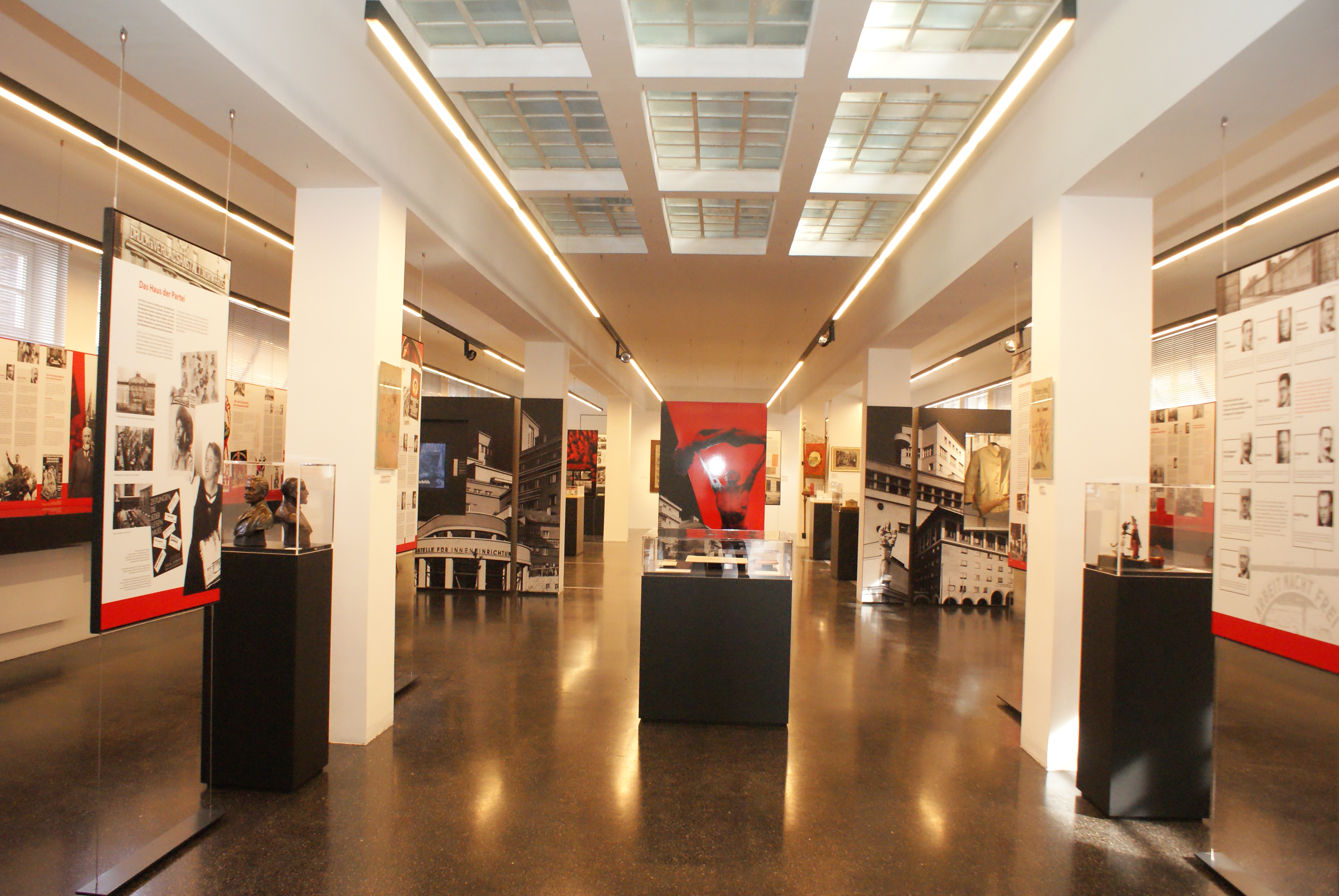
Permanent exhibition on Red Vienna at the Karl-Marx-Hof Laundry Room

The Social Democrats introduced new taxes by state law, which were collected in addition to federal taxes, colloquially referred to as "Breitner Taxes" in reference to then-Finanzkanzler Hugo Breitner. These taxes were imposed on luxury goods such as riding horses, large private cars, servants in private households, and hotel rooms.

Another new tax, the Wohnbausteuer (en: “Housing Construction Tax”), was also structured as a progressive tax levied by rising percentages based on income. The revenue from this tax was used to finance the municipality's extensive housing program. However, these two new tax structures only provided a portion of the total funding for Vienna's municipal welfare, much of which relied on funding from the national government. As time progressed, the reliance on financing from an uncooperative, if not actively hostile, federal government left the Gemeinderat vulnerable to pressure from the CSP to roll back some of the municipal programs.

Hugo Breitner, in contrast to the Austrian Social Democrats after 1945, consistently refused to take up credits to finance social services, financing all projects and investments directly through taxation. This allowed the Gemeinderat to avoid taking on debt. Due to over-reliance on funding from the Nationalrat, these services had to be cut when, in the early thirties, the federal government started to financially starve Vienna.

== Politicians ==
Numerous politicians were associated with Vienna during this period, including but not limited to:

- Jakob Reumann, SDAP politician and first Mayor of Vienna during the First Austrian Republic.
- Karl Seitz, SDAP politician and second Mayor of Vienna during the First Austrian Republic, removed from office in 1934.
- Hugo Breitner, Finance Councillor for the City of Vienna, appointed under the administration of Jakob Reumann
- Julius Tandler, Healthcare Councillor for the City of Vienna and professor of anatomy at the University of Vienna
- Otto Glöckel, Minister of Education for the First Austrian Republic

== See also ==
- History of the Social Democratic Party of Austria
- History of Vienna
- Municipal socialism
- Red Vienna in the Laundry Room Karl-Marx-Hof
