= Michael R. Krätke =

German scholar of Marxism (born 1950)

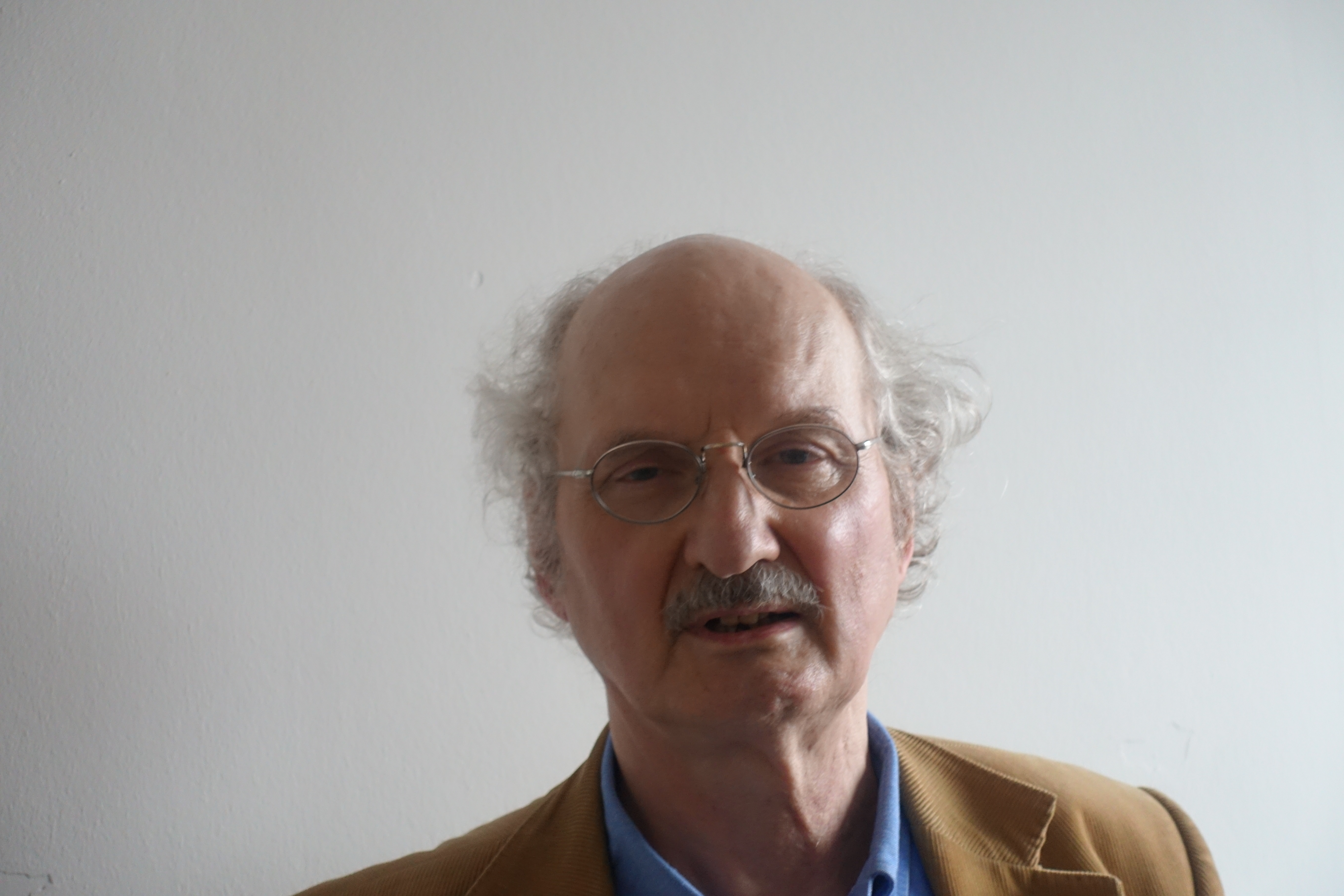
Krätke in 2018

Michael R. Krätke (born 1950) is a German economist, sociologist and political scientist at the Free University Berlin. He has worked as Assistant professor of sociology at the Free University Berlin and at the University of Bielefeld, in 1981 he became Associate professor of political economy at the University of Amsterdam, was professor for sociology, chair of political economy and director of the Institute for Advanced Studies at Lancaster University. Since 1978, he has been an editor of the German scholarly journal spw – Zeitschrift für sozialistische Politik und Wirtschaft.

Krätke has been working on the history of Marxism since the 1990s Among other things, he has developed a periodization of Marxist intellectual history and identified four stages: (1) from 1842 until Marx' death in 1883, (2) "classical marxism" from 1883 until World War I, (3) the third stage from the Russian Revolution into the 1960s, (4) the last stage of a social-scientific Marxism following the Marx-Renaissance of the 1960s. Since the early 1990s, he has also largely contributed to the ongoing research on the works of Marx and Engels, including their unpublished manuscripts, and became an editor of the scholarly review Beiträge zur Marx-Engels-Forschung. Neue Folge. He was a member of the Scientific Council of the Rosa Luxemburg Foundation and a member of the scientific advisory council to the German chapter of ATTAC.

== Writings ==
=== Selected works ===
- Bader, Veit Michael; Krätke, Michael (1975). Krise und Kapitalismus bei Marx [Crisis and Capitalism in Marx] (in German). Frankfurt a.M.: Europäische Verlagsanstalt.
- Krätke, Michael; Gransow, Volker (1978). Viktor Agartz, Gewerkschaften und Wirtschaftspolitik [Viktor Agartz, Trade Unions and Economic Policy] (in German). Berlin: Die Arbeitswelt.
- Krätke, Michael (1984). Kritik der Staatsfinanzen [Criticism of Public Finances] (in German). Hamburg: VSA.
- Ökonomie ohne Arbeit - Arbeit ohne Ökonomie? [Economy without Work - Work without Economy?] (in German). Hanover: Offizin. 1997.
- Krätke, Michael; Fülberth, Georg (2007). Neun Fragen zum Kapitalismus [Nine Questions about Capitalism] (in German). Berlin: Dietz.
- Demokratie und globale Wirtschaftskrise [Democracy and Global Economic Crisis] (in German). Zürich: Förderverein Widerspruch. 2008.
- Kritik der politischen Ökonomie heute. Zeitgenosse Marx [Critique of political economy today. Marx, our contemporary] (in German). Hamburg: VSA Verlag. 2017.
- Friedrich Engels oder: Wie ein Cotton-Lord den Marxismus erfand [Friedrich Engels or How a Cotton-Lord invented Marxism] (in German). Berlin: Karl Dietz Verlag. 2020.

=== Articles ===
- Klassen im Sozialstaat (Class in the Welfare State), In: Prokla, Vol. 15, 1985, Nr. 58, pp. 89 - 110.
- Steuergewalt, Versicherungszwang und ökonomisches Gesetz (The power to tax, compulsory insurance and economic law), In: Prokla, Vol. 21, 1991, Nr. 82, pp. 112 - 143.
- Globalisierung und Standortkonkurrenz (Globalization and competition of location), In: Leviathan, Vol. 25, Nr. 2 / 1997, pp. 202 - 232.
- Das Marx-Engels-Problem. Warum Engels das Marxsche „Kapital" nicht verfälscht hat (Why Engels did not falsify Marx's Capital) In: Marx-Engels-Jahrbuch 2006, Berlin 2007, S. 142–170.
- Die Mythen der Globalisierung (The Myth of Globalization). In: Zeitschrift Marxistische Erneuerung, December 2002.
- Le Dernier Marx et le Capital (Late Marx and Capital), In: Actuel Marx, No. 37, 2005, pp. 45 - 60.
- On the History and Logic of Modern Capitalism. The Legacy of Ernest Mandel, In: Historical Materialism, Vol. 15, No 1, 2007, pp.109 - 144.
