= Karl-Marx-Hof =

Housing complex in Vienna

Coordinates: 48°15′10″N 16°21′54″E

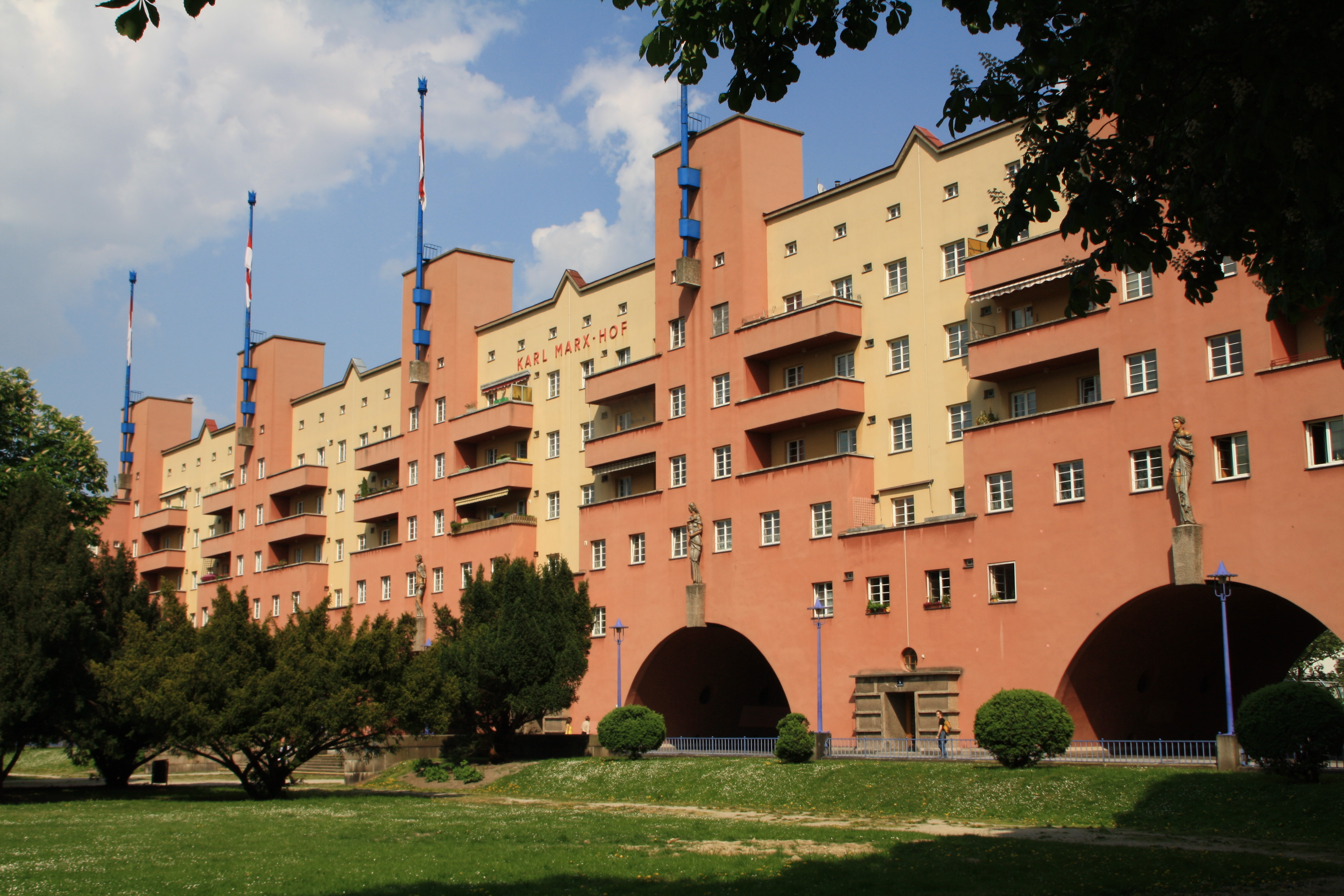
- Karl-Marx-Hof in Döbling, Vienna (2009)
- Interactive map of the Karl-Marx-Hof area

General information
- Architectural style: Modern
- Location: Heiligenstädter Straße 82-92, 1190 Vienna
- Year built: 1927-1930
- Construction started: 1927
- Completed: 1930
- Renovated: 1989-1992

Technical details
- Material: Brick

Design and construction
- Architect: Karl Ehn

Karl-Marx-Hof (German: [karl maʁks hoːf]; lit. 'Karl Marx Court') is a Gemeindebau in Vienna, situated in Heiligenstadt, a neighbourhood of the 19th district of Vienna, Döbling.

At 1,100 metres (0.68 mi) in length and spanning four tram stops, Karl-Marx-Hof is one of the longest single residential buildings in the world.

== Development ==
Karl-Marx-Hof was built on land that, until the 12th century, had been under the waters of the Danube, deep enough for ships to travel over the area.

By 1750, all that remained was a pool of water, which was drained on the order of Holy Roman Emperor Joseph II. Gardens were then built in the area, but these were removed by the Vienna city council, then under the "Red Vienna" period of control by the Social Democratic Party of Austria to make room for the erection of Karl-Marx-Hof, financed by a special tax named after councillor Hugo Breitner, commissioning locally and internationally renowned architects.

Karl-Marx-Hof was built between 1927 and 1930 by city planner Karl Ehn, a follower of Otto Wagner. It held 1,382 apartments (with a size of 30–60 m^{2} each). Only 18.5% of the 156,000 m^{2}-large area was built up, with the rest of the area developed into play areas and gardens. Designed for a population of about 5,000, the premises include many amenities, including laundromats, baths, kindergartens, a library, doctor's offices, and business offices.

== Austrian Civil War, Ständestaat, and the Anschluss ==
During the February Uprising of the 1934 Austrian Civil War, insurgents engaged in the revolt barricaded themselves inside the building and were forced to surrender after the Austrian army, the police, and the right-wing paramilitary Heimwehr bombarded the site regardless of the unarmed dwellers, mainly worker families, with light artillery. During the Anschluss, Karl-Marx-Hof was renamed Heiligenstädter Hof, but took its original name back in 1945.

== Today ==
The heavy artillery damage to Karl-Marx-Hof was repaired in the 1950s. It has been used as a filming location, including for the 1974 film The Night Porter. The building was refurbished between 1989 and 1992.

== See also ==
Other very long housing blocks:

- Byker Wall, Newcastle upon Tyne, UK
- Park Hill, Sheffield, UK
- Falowiec, Gdansk, Poland
- Le Lignon, Switzerland
- Fermont, Quebec
