= Gemeindebau =

Type of public housing buildings in Austria, especially in Vienna

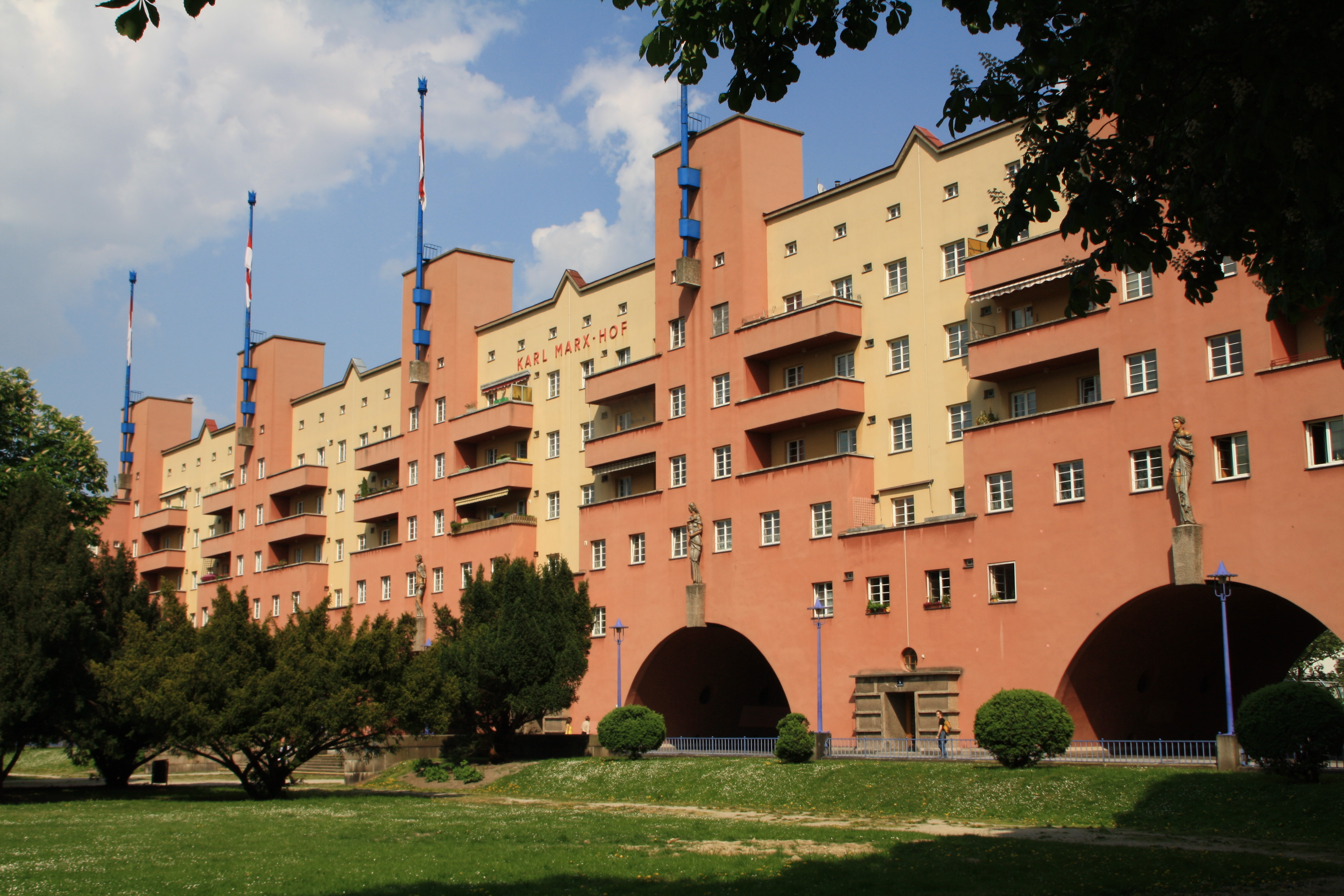
Karl-Marx-Hof in Döbling, Vienna (2009). The Gemeindebau was constructed between 1927 and 1933 during the Red Vienna period.

Gemeindebau (German: [ɡəˈmaɪndəbaʊ]; plural: Gemeindebauten) is an Austrian German word for "municipality building". It refers to residential buildings erected by a municipality in Austria, especially the city of Vienna, usually to provide public housing, as an example of council housing.

Apartments in the building can be rented from the respective municipality.

== Vienna ==
=== History ===
Gemeindebauten have become an important part of the architecture and culture of Vienna since the 1920s. Up to 1918, the housing conditions of Vienna's growing working class were appalling by modern standards. City investigators routinely discovered unsanitary living conditions during inspections, with issues of overcrowding, excessive moisture, and a complete lack of light and air being among the most frequently cited problems. By 1877, the municipal health authority of the city (the Stadtfysikat) reported 1,113 instances of unfit dwellings, over two-thirds of which were cited for excess moisture. Overcrowding was also a perennial issue, and one case documented in the municipal health report of 1871 found that

In a shack which contained hardly enough space for six people, forty were crammed together, two of which were sick with typhoid. On the floor of this shack alone there were twelve beds. In another wooden shack covered on the outside with earth and provided with only a small, permanently closed window, there were thirteen people. There was no trace of any lavatories, and cooking had to be done with turbid water from dirty wells; otherwise no wells were available. Also several mud huts were discovered, hardly visible to onlookers, attached to the embankment of the newly-filled dam. These consisted of planks and posts, converging upwards at an acute angle, and externally covered with earth. Entry could only be achieved from a crouching position, and each of these hovels only received light and air through the one foot [12.44 inches] wide entrance ...

When the Social Democratic Workers' Party of Austria (SDPAÖ) gained control of the municipal administration during Austria's First Republic (1918–1934) (beginning the so-called "Red Vienna" period), it began the project of improving living conditions for workers. A large number of Gemeindebauten, usually large residential estates, were built during that time. Including those buildings that were finished after the events of February 1934, 64,000 apartments were completed, which created housing space for about 220,000 people. Apartments were assigned on the basis of a point system favoring families and less affluent citizens.

The classic interwar Gemeindebauten typically have a main entrance with a large gate, through which one enters into a yard. Inside, there are trees and some greenery, where children can play without having to go out on the street. Apartments are accessed from the inside.

This fortress-like structure made the buildings adaptable to military use. Several Gemeindebauten in Vienna, most notably the Karl-Marx-Hof, were sites of fighting during the Austrian Civil War of February 1934, when they were defended as Social Democratic Party strongholds.

Gemeindebauten continued to be built after 1945, but the style of architecture changed over the decades. During the 1960s and 1970s, the municipality began to build extensive residential blocks consisting of high-rise buildings such as Großfeldsiedlung.

=== Characteristics ===
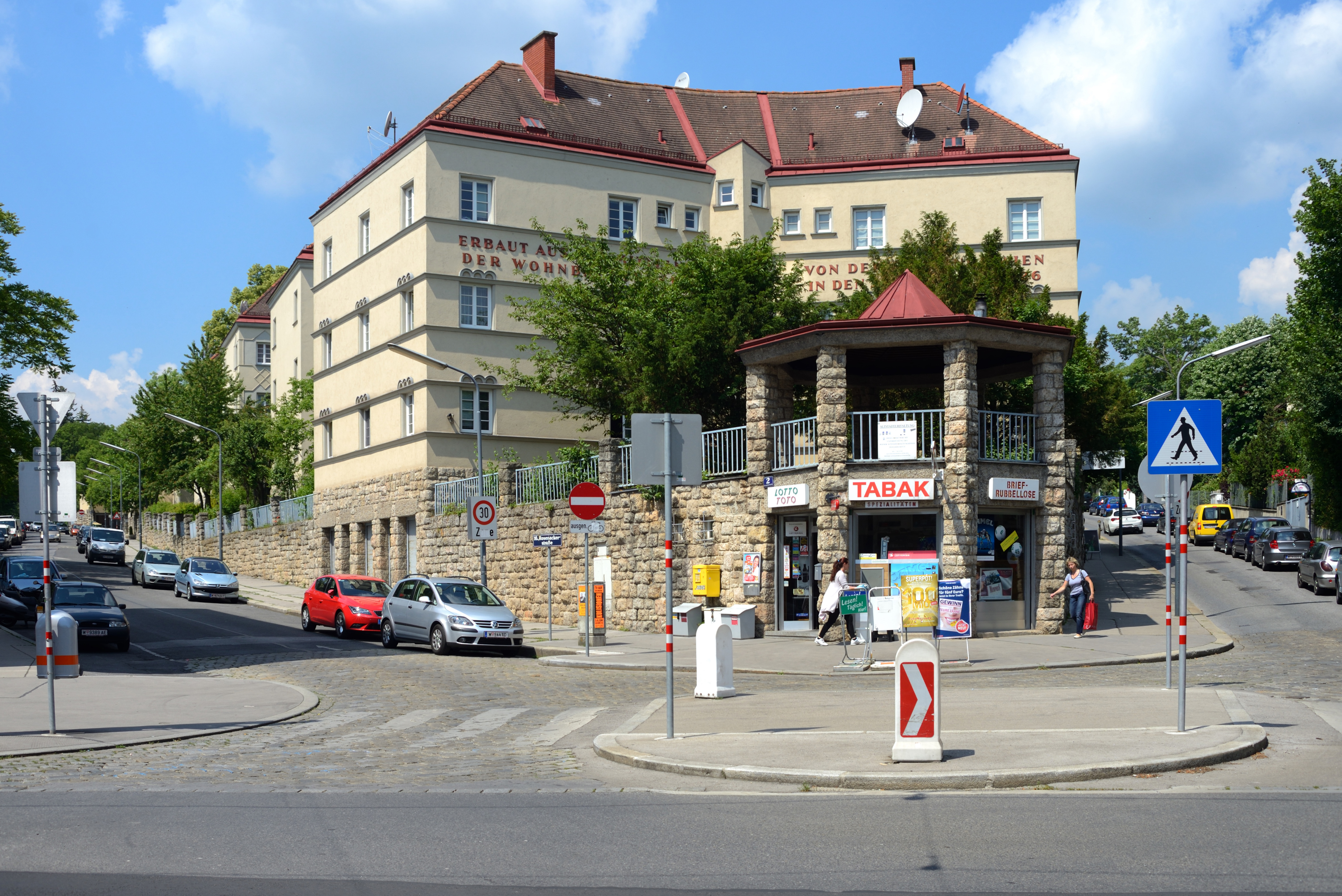
The Sandleitenhof and tobacconist in the 16th district Ottakring

Gemeindebauten in Vienna can be recognized by the following text (or similar) which can usually be found in large red letters above the main entrance:

Wohnhausanlage der Gemeinde Wien errichtet in den Jahren 1925 bis 1927 aus den Mitteln der Wohnbausteuer
(Residential estate of the Municipality of Vienna built from 1925 to 1927 financed from the revenues of the Residential Construction Tax).

Larger Gemeindebauten are identified by their name. The names sometimes derive from the building's geographic location, but usually they are named after a person, sometimes after a famous freedom fighter (e.g., George Washington), but much more often after a famous socialist (e.g., Olof Palme, Karl Marx, Friedrich Engles) or a Viennese Social Democratic Party functionary.

Today, about 600,000 people (not necessarily poor ones), about a third of the population of Vienna, live in apartments owned by the city. The Social Democratic Party has been firmly in control of the municipal administration since World War II. Opposition politicians sometimes claim that party members are more likely to be assigned an apartment.

=== Notable Gemeindebauten ===
The most famous Gemeindebau in Vienna is the Karl-Marx-Hof, built between 1927 and 1933. Other notable buildings are:

- Lassalle-Hof (1926, named after Ferdinand Lassalle)
- Rabenhof (1927)
- Metzleinstaler Hof (1920, named after the Matzleinsdorf suburb's old name)
- Reumannhof (1926, named after Jakob Reumann)
- Viktor-Adler-Hof (1924, named after Victor Adler)
- George-Washington-Hof (1930)
- Sandleitenhof (1928, named after former sand pits in the area)
- Wohnhausanlage Friedrich-Engels-Platz (1933, named after Friedrich Engels)
- Karl-Seitz-Hof (1933, named after Karl Seitz)
- Paul-Speiser-Hof (1929, named after Paul Speiser)
- Goethehof (1930, named after Johann Wolfgang von Goethe)

== Gallery ==
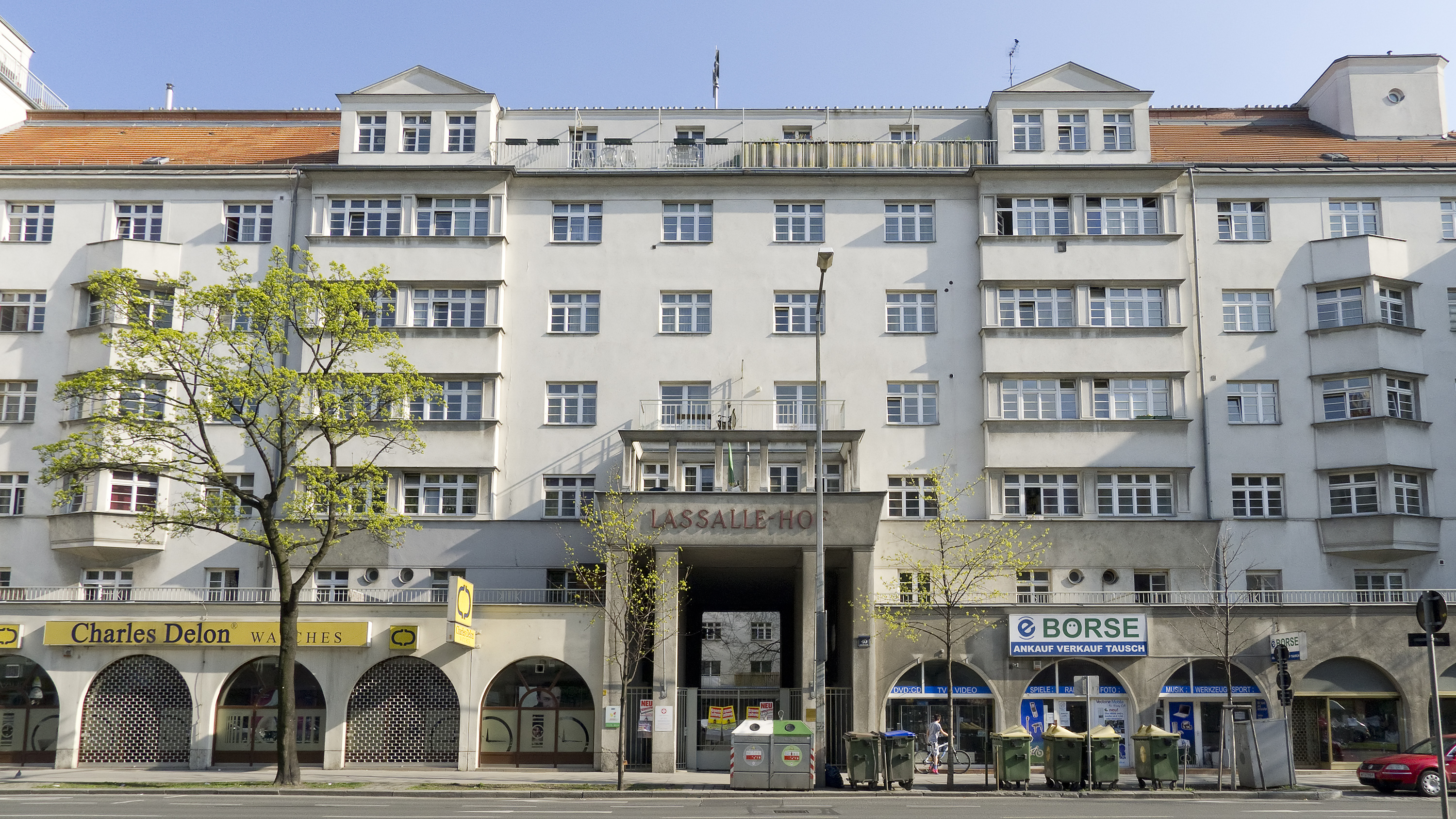
Lassalle-Hof, Main entrance and shops on Lassallestraße (1924–1926)

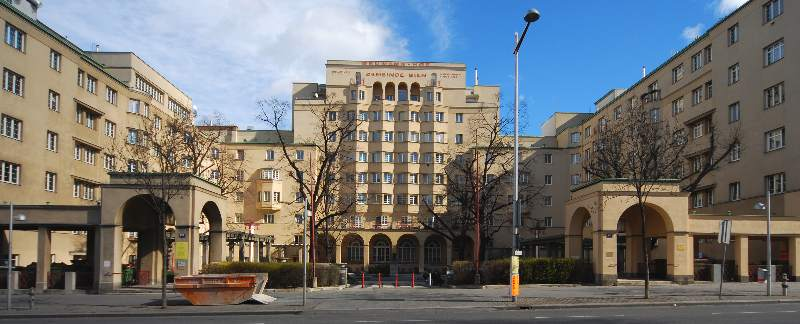
Street courtyard of the Reumannhof in the 5th district (1924–1926)

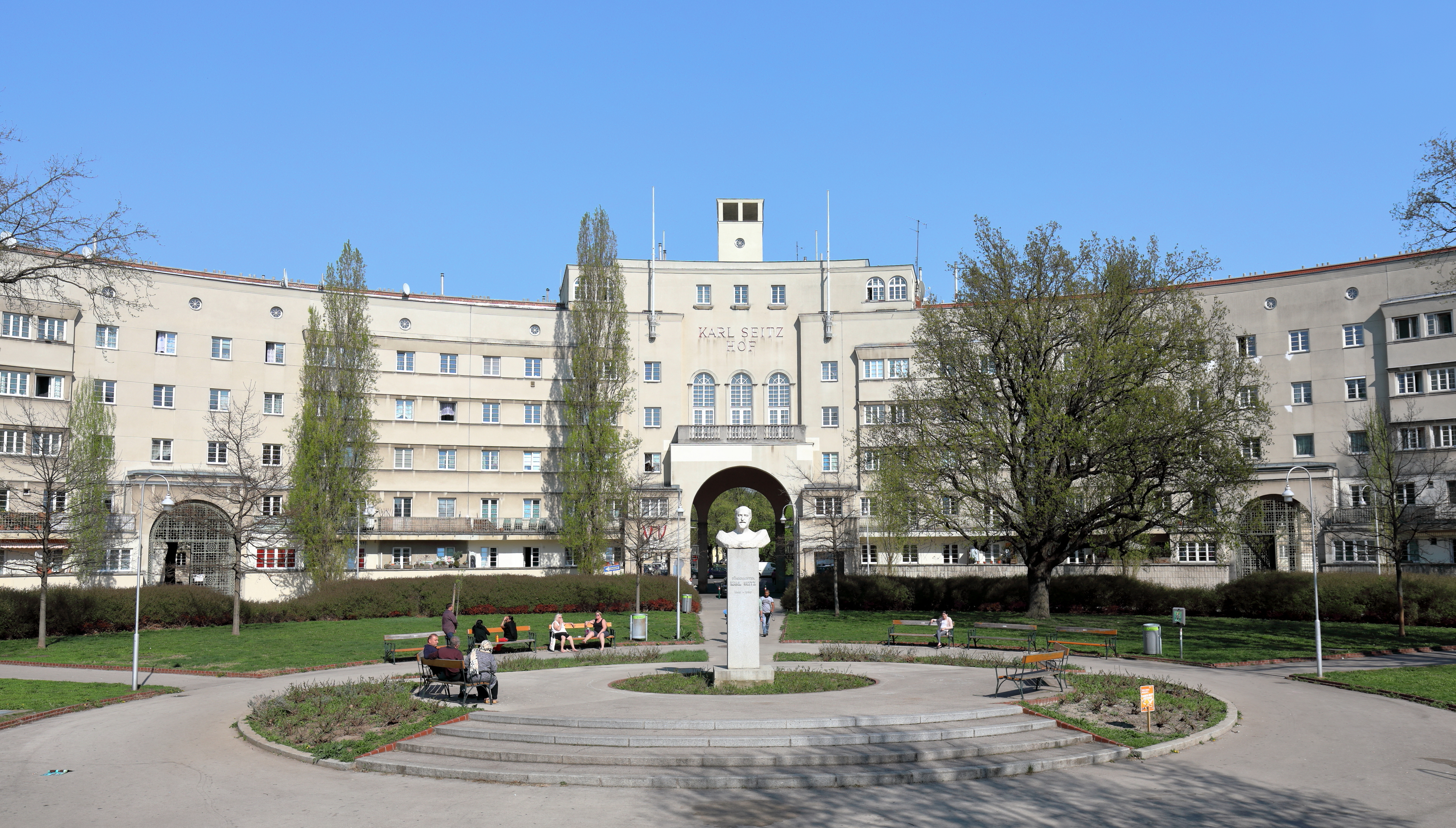
Karl-Seitz-Hof in Floridsdorf (1926–1933)

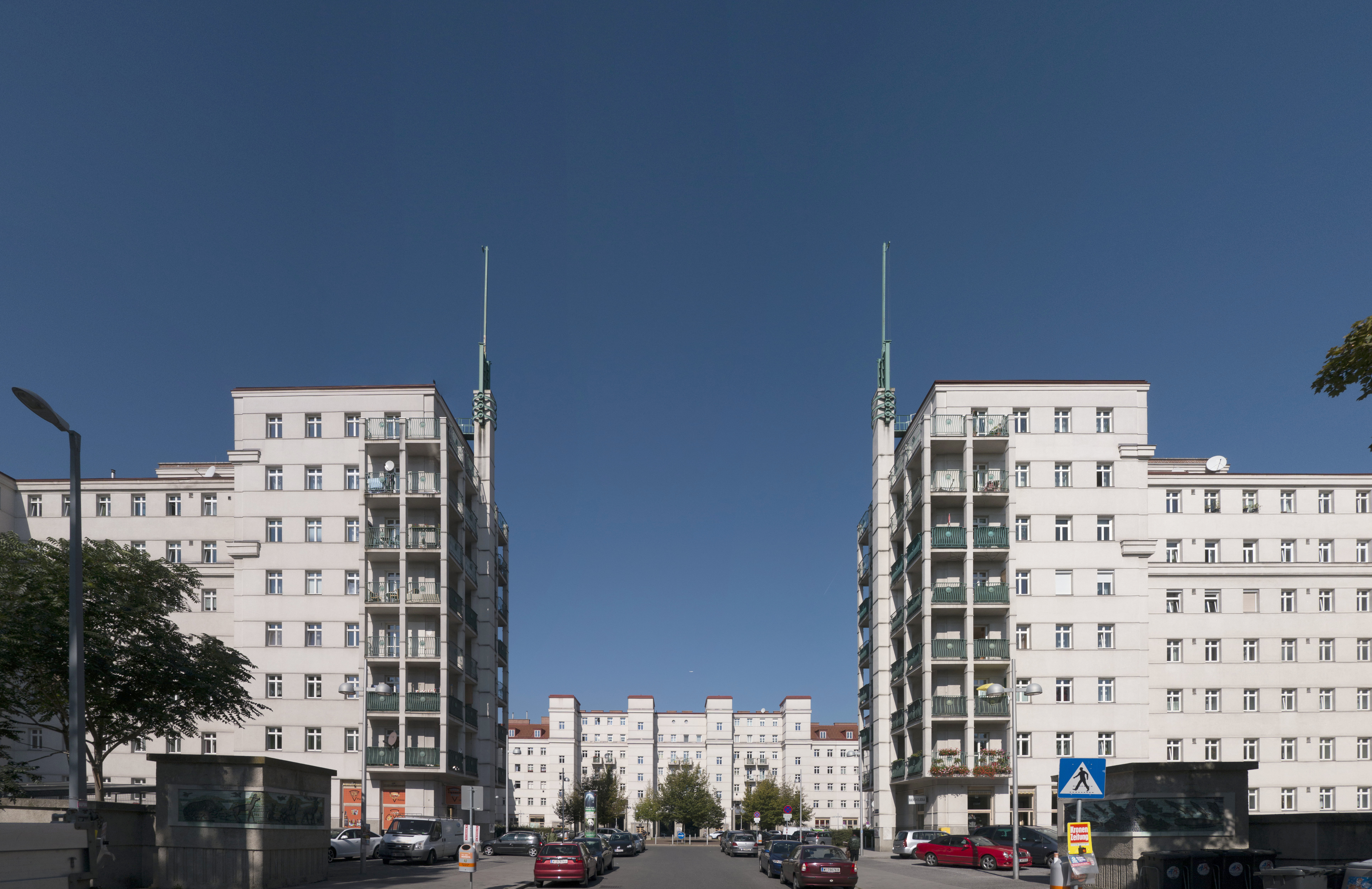
Residential complex Friedrich-Engels-Platz in Brigittenau (1930–1933)
