= Viktor Reimann =

Austrian politician (1915–1996)

Viktor Riemann (25 January 1915 – 7 October 1996) was an Austrian author, commentator, journalist and politician (VdU). He sat as a member of the "Nationalrat" ("National Parliament") between 1949 and 1956.

Despite his involvement in liberation activism and subsequent imprisonment following the country's incorporation into Hitler's Germany, Riemann found himself identified as a controversialist, or on occasion more simply as an embarrassment, by representatives of the consensual centrist Austrian political mainstream during the postwar decades. A succession of political biographies and his newspaper contributions may have contributed to this.

== Biography ==
=== Early years ===
Viktor Reimann was born and died in Vienna. Successful completion of his schooling led him to the University of Vienna where he studied History and Germanistics. Heinrich von Srbik and Hans Hirsch were two of his history tutors. In 1936 he was actively involved with the (still, in Austria, illegal) National Socialist Party. After 1938 he switched to a position of opposition, driven primarily by simple hostility to Austria having recently been integrated into an enlarged German state. In the autumn of 1938, Reimann teamed up with the Augustinian canon regular Roman Karl Scholz to set up a "catholic-conservative" resistance group. After war broke out, in September 1939, the group was renamed, becoming the "Austrian Freedom Movement" ("Österreichische Freiheitsbewegung"). Their political objectives were to start by educating people about the true nature of National Socialism, and then to accomplish the downfall of the Nazi regime. This should be accompanied by the extraction of the Danube and Alpine provinces from the recently enlarged German state, and the re-establishment of an independent Austria, which should also incorporate Bavaria, thereby extending in a northerly direction all the way to the River Main. In the end, there were around 300-400 members, many of whom had been taught by Scholz at the monastery school an hour's walk downriver from Vienna. The group was also networked with other resistance groups, notably in former Czechoslovakia, and maintained contacts with agents of the allied powers. Such contacts were not without their own risks, however. The "Austrian Freedom Movement" was smashed thanks to betrayal by one of its members, the government spy and Burgtheater stage actor Otto Hartmann. The authorities arrested Riemann towards the end of 1940. He was held in investigatory detention for two years and then, early in 1943, sentenced by the special People's Court to ten years imprisonment. Till 1945 Viktor Reimann survived his detention at the punishment prison in Straubing.

=== After the war ===
Soviet troops reached the border from Hungary at the end of March 1945 and captured Vienna after two weeks of savage fighting by the middle of April. By the end of 1945 the Soviet occupiers had acquiesced in the creation of a provisional government under Karl Renner which immediately came into line with the tide of history by endorsing the 1943 Moscow Declarations and repudiating the 1938 annexation. War formally ended in May 1945, and with it the National Socialist chapter in Austrian (and European) history. When he was released from prison Viktor Riemann was already relatively close to home and in July 1945 he became a contributing editor on the newly launched Salzburger Nachrichten (daily newspaper). Austria had been divided into four zones of military occupation: Salzburg had ended up not in the Soviet occupation zone but in the US occupation zone, and initially the newspaper's publication was under the close control of General Eisenhower's twelfth army corps. By the end of 1945 Reimann had become deputy editor in chief, a position he retained till 1948. There are nevertheless suggestions that his (at this stage) pro-US political stance sometimes led to difficulties with senior colleagues at the paper.

During his time at the Salzburger Nachrichten Viktor Reimann rediscovered an appetite for political activism more generally. With Herbert Kraus, he was a co-founder, in March 1949, of the "Verband der Unabhängigen" ("Federation of Independents" / VdU) party. When a Salzburg party branch was set up on 1 September 1949 Reimann became its chairman, as well as head of the party press department.

=== Politician-journalist ===
Viktor Reimann became a member of the "Nationalrat" ("National Parliament") in 1949. His was one of 16 seats allocated to the "Wahlpartei der Unabhängigen" (as the VdU was briefly known) which had won nearly 12% of the national vote. In the previous election, which had taken place in 1945, approximately 556,000 former members of the National Socialist party had been deprived of the right to vote. These people regained their voting rights ahead of the 1949 election. There were strong inferences drawn from the pattern of the election results, that the former National Socialists voted in disproportionately high numbers for the VdU rather than for the mainstream centre-right and centre-left ÖVP and SPÖ parties (with respectively 44% and 39% of the national vote). Attitudes towards Reimann, a relatively high-profile VdU member of parliament, were affected by those perceptions, both during his political career and subsequently.

During the build-up to the ("anti-communist") Vienna Brecht boycott which took hold in the city's theatres for ten years between 1953 and 1963, Reimann joined in the criticism of the iconic playwright. In a contribution which he made in October 1951 to the bimonthly periodical Neue Front under the headline "Wer schmuggelte das Kommunistenpferd in das deutsche Rom?" (loosely, "Who smuggled the communist wooden horse into the German Rome?"), Reimann wrote that "giving Bertolt Brecht Austrian citizenship [in 1950] shows that our country is still undermined by communism and the Americans are continuing to fund the spiritual Bolshevisation of Austria, exploiting the eager collaboration of certain socialist intellectuals along with the uncertainties and weaknesses of the cultural power-brokers of the [governing (in coalition)] ÖVP ("centre-right Austrian People's Party"), (Note: "Die Einbürgerung Bert Brechts zeigt, wie durch den Übereifer einzelner intellektueller Sozialisten und durch die Unwissenheit und Schwäche der kulturellen Machthaber der Volkspartei unser Land kommunistisch unterminiert wird und die Amerikaner die geistige Bolschewisierung Österreichs noch finanzieren.")

Throughout his time as an opposition member of parliament, Reimann's increasing public profile seems to have owed more to his continuing work as a journalist than to any contributions he made with his parliamentary work. He was editor-in-chief of the party's daily newspaper, Österreichische Allgemeine Zeitung, from its launch on 1 December 1949 till April 1950 when publication came to an end for reasons of cost. The party's weekly newspaper, Neue Front, fared better, printed in Salzburg alongside the Salzburger Nachrichten for seven years between 25 February 1949 and 1956. Viktor Reimann was its editor-in-chief throughout. Reimann's own contributions to Neue Front did much to burnish his credentials as a polemicist. Neue Front contained frequent articles criticising the activities of the Austrian People's Courts which had been established in 1945 (and which are not to be confused with the National Socialist era special People's Court that had concentrated on "political cases"). The post-1945 Austrian People's Courts were condemned and, some felt, defamed by "Neue Front" over their continuing attention to denunciations received concerning alleged "Nazi-era crimes". Sometimes the condemnations published had been written by Reimann himself. Those who saw Neue Front, its editor in chief, and indeed the VdU itself, as apologists for former National Socialist members and collaborators could be sharply critical, not simply within Austria, but also across the frontier in West Germany where some of the same concerns still resonated.

=== Journalist and author ===
Between 1956 and 1960 Reimann was employed as the head of the Press Department of the National Theatre Administration. One source describes his departure from that position a few years later as "noisy" ("geräuschvoll"), possibly because he followed it up with a sensationalist book about the widely revered Vienna State Opera. In 1970 he became a regular columnist with the mass-market Kronen Zeitung. His columns were not uncontentious. In 1972 he became editor-in-chief for the paper's Upper Austria edition, and in 1974 he moved across from Linz to Vienna in order to take charge of the arts and culture section, retaining this position till 1987.

Several of Reimann's contributions, notably his 1974 series of articles in a series called "The Jews in Austria" which appeared in the Kronen Zeitung, became a focus of research involving possible antisemitic content. Conclusions were far from unanimous. There were findings along the lines that neither the intent nor the spirit of the content were as crudely or overtly antisemitic as some of the material appearing in the gutter press at the same time: that fell far short of a complete exoneration.

Under the title Die Dritte Kraft in Österreich (The Third Force in Austria), Viktor Reimann published a history of the political Austrian "Third estate" since 1945. This study of the frequently overlooked classes drew praise from Wolfgang Purtscheller who found it a "deeply apologetic and for that reason deeply interesting book over the re-emergence of a national identity". (Note: "... überaus apologetisches und gerade deswegen hochinteressantes Buch über den Wiederaufbau des nationalen Lagers".)

== Publications (selection) ==
- Innitzer. Kardinal zwischen Hitler und Rom. Neuausgabe. Amalthea, Wien, München 1988, ISBN 3-85002-268-4
- Zu groß für Österreich. Seipel und Bauer im Kampf um die Erste Republik. Molden, Wien u. a. 1968
- Dr. Joseph Goebbels. Molden, Wien u. a. 1971. Neuauflage 1976 ISBN 3-217-05018-5, französische Übersetzung erschienen im Flammarion-Verlag, Paris 1973
- Bruno Kreisky. Das Porträt eines Staatsmannes. Molden, Wien u. a. 1972, ISBN 3-217-00300-4
- Die Dritte Kraft in Österreich. Molden, Wien u. a. 1980
- Fünf ungewöhnliche Gespräche. Verlag Carl Ueberreuter, Wien 1991, ISBN 3-8000-3380-1
