= Klagenfurt (National Council electoral district) =

Parliamentary electoral district in Austria

- Celovec
- Electoral District for the National Council
- Location of Klagenfurt within Austria
- District: List: Klagenfurt City; Klagenfurt Rural
- State: Carinthia
- Population: 166,574 (2024)
- Electorate: 121,099 (2019)
- Area: 886 km^{2} (2023)

Current Electoral District
- Created: 1994
- Seats: 3 (1994–present)
- Members: Elisabeth Scheucher-Pichler (ÖVP)

Klagenfurt (Slovene: Celovec), also known as Electoral District 2A (German: Wahlkreis 2A), is one of the 39 multi-member regional electoral districts of the National Council, the lower house of the Austrian Parliament, the national legislature of Austria. The electoral district was created in 1992 when electoral regulations were amended to add regional electoral districts to the existing state-wide electoral districts and came into being at the following legislative election in 1994. It consists of the city of Klagenfurt and the district of Klagenfurt Rural in the state of Carinthia. The electoral district currently elects three of the 183 members of the National Council using the open party-list proportional representation electoral system. At the 2019 legislative election the constituency had 121,099 registered electors.

== History ==
Klagenfurt was one 43 regional electoral districts (regionalwahlkreise) established by the "National Council Electoral Regulations 1992" (Nationalrats-Wahlordnung 1992) passed by the National Council in 1992. It consisted of the city of Klagenfurt and the district of Klagenfurt Rural in the state of Carinthia. The district was initially allocated three seats in May 1993.

== Electoral system ==
Klagenfurt currently elects three of the 183 members of the National Council using the open party-list proportional representation electoral system. The allocation of seats is carried out in three stages. In the first stage, seats are allocated to parties (lists) at the regional level using a state-wide Hare quota (wahlzahl) (valid votes in the state divided by the number of seats in the state). In the second stage, seats are allocated to parties at the state/provincial level using the state-wide Hare quota (any seats won by the party at the regional stage are subtracted from the party's state seats). In the third and final stage, seats are allocated to parties at the federal/national level using the D'Hondt method (any seats won by the party at the regional and state stages are subtracted from the party's federal seats). Only parties that reach the 4% national threshold, or have won a seat at the regional stage, compete for seats at the state and federal stages.

Electors may cast one preferential vote for individual candidates at the regional, state and federal levels. Split-ticket voting (panachage), or voting for more than one candidate at each level, is not permitted and will result in the ballot paper being invalidated. At the regional level, candidates must receive preferential votes amounting to at least 14% of the valid votes cast for their party to over-ride the order of the party list (10% and 7% respectively for the state and federal levels). Prior to April 2013 electors could not cast preferential votes at the federal level and the thresholds candidates needed to over-ride the party list order were higher at the regional level (half the Hare quota or 1/6 of the party votes) and state level (Hare quota).

== Election results ==
=== Summary ===
Election	Communists KPÖ+ / KPÖ			Social Democrats SPÖ			Greens GRÜNE			NEOS NEOS / LiF			People's ÖVP			Alliance for the Future BZÖ			Freedom FPÖ		
Election	Votes	%	Seats	Votes	%	Seats	Votes	%	Seats	Votes	%	Seats	Votes	%	Seats	Votes	%	Seats	Votes	%	Seats
2019	548	0.64%	0	21,602	25.15%	0	11,233	13.08%	0	7,105	8.27%	0	28,727	33.44%	1	315	0.37%	0	14,077	16.39%	0
2017	614	0.66%	0	27,426	29.52%	1	3,158	3.40%	0	4,917	5.29%	0	25,420	27.36%	0				25,518	27.47%	0
2013	701	0.82%	0	26,067	30.67%	1	13,997	16.47%	0	3,781	4.45%	0	12,370	14.56%	0	9,097	10.70%	0	13,009	15.31%	0
2008	651	0.72%	0	22,552	25.09%	0	9,579	10.65%	0	1,806	2.01%	0	13,154	14.63%	0	33,368	37.12%	1	6,495	7.22%	0
2006	956	1.11%	0	27,566	32.13%	1	9,736	11.35%	0				18,397	21.44%	0	20,742	24.18%	0	5,920	6.90%	0
2002	465	0.51%	0	32,096	35.35%	1	7,944	8.75%	0	995	1.10%	0	29,848	32.87%	1				19,445	21.42%	0
1999	317	0.37%	0	28,299	32.63%	1	6,663	7.68%	0	3,013	3.47%	0	14,015	16.16%	0				33,483	38.61%	1
1995	158	0.17%	0	35,121	38.34%	1	3,905	4.26%	0	4,385	4.79%	0	17,178	18.75%	0				29,958	32.70%	1
1994	122	0.14%	0	31,362	36.03%	1	6,387	7.34%	0	4,535	5.21%	0	13,421	15.42%	0				30,289	34.80%	1

=== Detailed ===
==== 2010s ====
===== 2019 =====
Results of the 2019 legislative election held on 29 September 2019:

Party		Votes per district			Total votes	%	Seats
Party		Klagen- furt City	Klagen- furt Rural	Voting card	Total votes	%	Seats
Austrian People's Party	ÖVP	16,235	12,393	99	28,727	33.44%	1
Social Democratic Party of Austria	SPÖ	12,556	8,976	70	21,602	25.15%	0
Freedom Party of Austria	FPÖ	8,055	5,979	43	14,077	16.39%	0
The Greens – The Green Alternative	GRÜNE	7,474	3,653	106	11,233	13.08%	0
NEOS – The New Austria and Liberal Forum	NEOS	4,568	2,483	54	7,105	8.27%	0
JETZT	JETZT	1,298	568	17	1,883	2.19%	0
KPÖ Plus	KPÖ+	367	177	4	548	0.64%	0
Der Wandel	WANDL	276	140	3	419	0.49%	0
Alliance for the Future of Austria	BZÖ	148	166	1	315	0.37%	0
Valid Votes		50,977	34,535	397	85,909	100.00%	1
Rejected Votes		701	577	6	1,284	1.47%	
Total Polled		51,678	35,112	403	87,193	72.00%	
Registered Electors		73,873	47,226		121,099		
Turnout		69.96%	74.35%		72.00%		

The following candidates were elected:

- Party mandates - Elisabeth Scheucher-Pichler (ÖVP), 2,579 votes.

===== 2017 =====
Results of the 2017 legislative election held on 15 October 2017:

Party		Votes per district			Total votes	%	Seats
Party		Klagen- furt City	Klagen- furt Rural	Voting card	Total votes	%	Seats
Social Democratic Party of Austria	SPÖ	16,446	10,821	159	27,426	29.52%	1
Freedom Party of Austria	FPÖ	14,568	10,878	72	25,518	27.47%	0
Austrian People's Party	ÖVP	14,723	10,545	152	25,420	27.36%	0
NEOS – The New Austria and Liberal Forum	NEOS	3,094	1,746	77	4,917	5.29%	0
Peter Pilz List	PILZ	2,945	1,573	56	4,574	4.92%	0
The Greens – The Green Alternative	GRÜNE	2,108	1,001	49	3,158	3.40%	0
My Vote Counts!	GILT	591	354	9	954	1.03%	0
Communist Party of Austria	KPÖ	405	201	8	614	0.66%	0
The Whites	WEIßE	106	80	0	186	0.20%	0
Free List Austria	FLÖ	93	42	0	135	0.15%	0
Valid Votes		55,079	37,241	582	92,902	100.00%	1
Rejected Votes		596	508	23	1,127	1.20%	
Total Polled		55,675	37,749	605	94,029	77.59%	
Registered Electors		73,972	47,222		121,194		
Turnout		75.26%	79.94%		77.59%		

The following candidates were elected:

- Party mandates - Philip Kucher (SPÖ), 2,528 votes.

===== 2013 =====
Results of the 2013 legislative election held on 29 September 2013:

Party		Votes per district			Total votes	%	Seats
Party		Klagen- furt City	Klagen- furt Rural	Voting card	Total votes	%	Seats
Social Democratic Party of Austria	SPÖ	14,858	11,159	50	26,067	30.67%	1
The Greens – The Green Alternative	GRÜNE	9,309	4,603	85	13,997	16.47%	0
Freedom Party of Austria	FPÖ	7,608	5,367	34	13,009	15.31%	0
Austrian People's Party	ÖVP	6,755	5,568	47	12,370	14.56%	0
Alliance for the Future of Austria	BZÖ	5,098	3,973	26	9,097	10.70%	0
Team Stronach	FRANK	3,000	2,287	13	5,300	6.24%	0
NEOS – The New Austria	NEOS	2,448	1,293	40	3,781	4.45%	0
Communist Party of Austria	KPÖ	450	243	8	701	0.82%	0
Pirate Party of Austria	PIRAT	422	232	4	658	0.77%	0
Valid Votes		49,948	34,725	307	84,980	100.00%	1
Rejected Votes		777	691	9	1,477	1.71%	
Total Polled		50,725	35,416	316	86,457	71.43%	
Registered Electors		73,937	47,104		121,041		
Turnout		68.61%	75.19%		71.43%		

The following candidates were elected:

- Party mandates - Philip Kucher (SPÖ), 2,534 votes.

==== 2000s ====
===== 2008 =====
Results of the 2008 legislative election held on 28 September 2008:

Party		Votes per district			Total votes	%	Seats
Party		Klagen- furt City	Klagen- furt Rural	Voting card	Total votes	%	Seats
Alliance for the Future of Austria	BZÖ	19,173	13,948	247	33,368	37.12%	1
Social Democratic Party of Austria	SPÖ	12,526	9,824	202	22,552	25.09%	0
Austrian People's Party	ÖVP	7,669	5,267	218	13,154	14.63%	0
The Greens – The Green Alternative	GRÜNE	6,475	2,837	267	9,579	10.65%	0
Freedom Party of Austria	FPÖ	3,933	2,494	68	6,495	7.22%	0
Liberal Forum	LiF	959	794	53	1,806	2.01%	0
Fritz Dinkhauser List – Citizens' Forum Tyrol	FRITZ	582	329	17	928	1.03%	0
Independent Citizens' Initiative Save Austria	RETTÖ	417	271	7	695	0.77%	0
Communist Party of Austria	KPÖ	404	241	6	651	0.72%	0
The Christians	DC	273	153	3	429	0.48%	0
List Karlheinz Klement	KHK	76	70	0	146	0.16%	0
List Strong	STARK	78	20	1	99	0.11%	0
Valid Votes		52,565	36,248	1,089	89,902	100.00%	1
Rejected Votes		1,172	892	36	2,100	2.28%	
Total Polled		53,737	37,140	1,125	92,002	76.68%	
Registered Electors		73,010	46,967		119,977		
Turnout		73.60%	79.08%		76.68%		

The following candidates were elected:

- Party mandates - Gernot Darmann (BZÖ), 566 votes. (Note: BZÖ: 1st placed candidate Jörg Haider was killed in a road accident on 11 October 2008, prior to the commencement of the new legislature on 28 October 2008.)

Substitutions:

- Gernot Darmann (BZÖ) resigned on 30 March 2009 and was replaced by Martin Strutz (BZÖ) on 31 March 2009.

===== 2006 =====
Results of the 2006 legislative election held on 1 October 2006:

Party		Votes per district			Total votes	%	Seats
Party		Klagen- furt City	Klagen- furt Rural	Voting card	Total votes	%	Seats
Social Democratic Party of Austria	SPÖ	15,351	11,171	1,044	27,566	32.13%	1
Alliance for the Future of Austria	BZÖ	11,786	8,464	492	20,742	24.18%	0
Austrian People's Party	ÖVP	10,137	7,011	1,249	18,397	21.44%	0
The Greens – The Green Alternative	GRÜNE	5,931	2,771	1,034	9,736	11.35%	0
Freedom Party of Austria	FPÖ	3,533	2,153	234	5,920	6.90%	0
Hans-Peter Martin's List	MATIN	965	597	66	1,628	1.90%	0
Communist Party of Austria	KPÖ	553	340	63	956	1.11%	0
EU Withdrawal – Neutral Free Austria	NFÖ	204	158	14	376	0.44%	0
Certainly – Absolutely – Independent, Franz Radinger	SAU	212	119	6	337	0.39%	0
List Strong	STARK	81	53	5	139	0.16%	0
Valid Votes		48,753	32,837	4,207	85,797	100.00%	1
Rejected Votes		1,056	874	60	1,990	2.27%	
Total Polled		49,809	33,711	4,267	87,787	75.92%	
Registered Electors		70,528	45,101		115,629		
Turnout		70.62%	74.75%		75.92%		

The following candidates were elected:

- Personal mandates - Melitta Trunk (SPÖ), 4,968 votes.

===== 2002 =====
Results of the 2002 legislative election held on 24 November 2002:

Party		Votes per district			Total votes	%	Seats
Party		Klagen- furt City	Klagen- furt Rural	Voting card	Total votes	%	Seats
Social Democratic Party of Austria	SPÖ	18,152	12,828	1,116	32,096	35.35%	1
Austrian People's Party	ÖVP	17,051	10,945	1,852	29,848	32.87%	1
Freedom Party of Austria	FPÖ	11,309	7,571	565	19,445	21.42%	0
The Greens – The Green Alternative	GRÜNE	4,748	2,100	1,096	7,944	8.75%	0
Liberal Forum	LiF	636	290	69	995	1.10%	0
Communist Party of Austria	KPÖ	285	166	14	465	0.51%	0
Valid Votes		52,181	33,900	4,712	90,793	100.00%	2
Rejected Votes		1,084	834	47	1,965	2.12%	
Total Polled		53,265	34,734	4,759	92,758	82.68%	
Registered Electors		68,928	43,261		112,189		
Turnout		77.28%	80.29%		82.68%		

The following candidates were elected:

- Personal mandates - Elisabeth Scheucher-Pichler (ÖVP), 6,105 votes; and Melitta Trunk (SPÖ), 5,949 votes.

==== 1990s ====
===== 1999 =====
Results of the 1999 legislative election held on 3 October 1999:

Party		Votes per district			Total votes	%	Seats
Party		Klagen- furt City	Klagen- furt Rural	Voting card	Total votes	%	Seats
Freedom Party of Austria	FPÖ	19,441	12,689	1,353	33,483	38.61%	1
Social Democratic Party of Austria	SPÖ	15,807	11,410	1,082	28,299	32.63%	1
Austrian People's Party	ÖVP	7,943	5,200	872	14,015	16.16%	0
The Greens – The Green Alternative	GRÜNE	4,055	1,875	733	6,663	7.68%	0
Liberal Forum	LiF	1,648	873	492	3,013	3.47%	0
The Independents	DU	439	232	31	702	0.81%	0
Communist Party of Austria	KPÖ	197	103	17	317	0.37%	0
No to NATO and EU – Neutral Austria Citizens' Initiative	NEIN	148	78	5	231	0.27%	0
Valid Votes		49,678	32,460	4,585	86,723	100.00%	2
Rejected Votes		882	705	34	1,621	1.83%	
Total Polled		50,560	33,165	4,619	88,344	79.15%	
Registered Electors		69,067	42,554		111,621		
Turnout		73.20%	77.94%		79.15%		

The following candidates were elected:

- Party mandates - Dieter Antoni (SPÖ), 1,467 votes; and Sigisbert Dolinschek (FPÖ), 710 votes. (Note: FPÖ: 1st placed candidate Reinhart Gaugg was elected in Carinthia.)

===== 1995 =====
Results of the 1995 legislative election held on 17 December 1995:

Party		Votes per district			Total votes	%	Seats
Party		Klagen- furt City	Klagen- furt Rural	Voting card	Total votes	%	Seats
Social Democratic Party of Austria	SPÖ	20,282	13,809	1,030	35,121	38.34%	1
Freedom Party of Austria	FPÖ	17,983	10,916	1,059	29,958	32.70%	1
Austrian People's Party	ÖVP	9,993	6,170	1,015	17,178	18.75%	0
Liberal Forum	LiF	2,412	1,263	710	4,385	4.79%	0
The Greens – The Green Alternative	GRÜNE	2,280	1,047	578	3,905	4.26%	0
No – Civic Action Group; Against the Sale of Austria	NEIN	396	168	27	591	0.65%	0
The Best Party	DBP	200	89	19	308	0.34%	0
Communist Party of Austria	KPÖ	107	45	6	158	0.17%	0
Valid Votes		53,653	33,507	4,444	91,604	100.00%	2
Rejected Votes		1,284	925	51	2,260	2.41%	
Total Polled		54,937	34,432	4,495	93,864	85.04%	
Registered Electors		68,742	41,630		110,372		
Turnout		79.92%	82.71%		85.04%		

The following candidates were elected:

- Party mandates - Dieter Antoni (SPÖ), 1,431 votes; and Sigisbert Dolinschek (FPÖ), 386 votes. (Note: FPÖ: 1st placed candidate Jörg Haider was elected on the federal list.)

===== 1994 =====
Results of the 1994 legislative election held on 9 October 1994:

Party		Votes per district			Total votes	%	Seats
Party		Klagen- furt City	Klagen- furt Rural	Voting card	Total votes	%	Seats
Social Democratic Party of Austria	SPÖ	17,586	12,640	1,136	31,362	36.03%	1
Freedom Party of Austria	FPÖ	18,037	11,013	1,239	30,289	34.80%	1
Austrian People's Party	ÖVP	7,473	5,078	870	13,421	15.42%	0
The Greens – The Green Alternative	GRÜNE	3,736	1,806	845	6,387	7.34%	0
Liberal Forum	LiF	2,731	1,185	619	4,535	5.21%	0
No – Civic Action Group; Against the Sale of Austria	NEIN	288	153	24	465	0.53%	0
United Greens Austria – List Adi Pinter	VGÖ	153	63	20	236	0.27%	0
The Best Party	DBP	152	66	11	229	0.26%	0
Communist Party of Austria	KPÖ	83	33	6	122	0.14%	0
Valid Votes		50,239	32,037	4,770	87,046	100.00%	2
Rejected Votes		1,011	739	47	1,797	2.02%	
Total Polled		51,250	32,776	4,817	88,843	80.54%	
Registered Electors		68,896	41,417		110,313		
Turnout		74.39%	79.14%		80.54%		

The following candidates were elected:

- Party mandates - Dieter Antoni (SPÖ), 2,167 votes; and Sigisbert Dolinschek (FPÖ), 373 votes.
