= Federation of Independents =

Federation of Independents Verband der Unabhängigen
- Founder: Herbert Kraus; Viktor Reimann
- Founded: 25 March 1949
- Dissolved: 1955/1956
- Preceded by: Greater German People's Party; Landbund; Nazi Party (not legal predecessors)
- Succeeded by: Freedom Party of Austria
- Ideology: German nationalism National liberalism
- Political position: Right-wing

The Federation of Independents (German: Verband der Unabhängigen, VdU) was a German nationalist and national-liberal political party in Austria active from 1949 to 1955. It was the predecessor of the Freedom Party of Austria (FPÖ).

== Formation ==
The party was officially founded on 25 March 1949 by Herbert Kraus and Viktor Reimann. The party's formation had been encouraged by the Socialist Party of Austria (SPÖ), which sought to split the right-wing vote in the 1949 legislative election in order to weaken the conservative People's Party (ÖVP) and gain a parliamentary majority. On the next day the constituent assembly was held at Salzburg, then in the US occupation zone. Herbert Kraus was elected Chairman (Bundesobmann), while Viktor Reimann, Josef Karoly, Karl Hartleb and Karl Winkler were appointed Vice-Chairmen (Bundesobmann-Stellvertreter). Kraus was party leader until 1952.

VdU saw itself as representing the interests of former members of the Nazi Party, expellees from Central and Eastern Europe, returning prisoners of war and other discontent portions of the Austrian population. Although close to the ÖVP, the party also advocated liberal individualism, and did not concern itself much with the "Catholic question." VdU supported the abolition of denazification laws limiting the political activities of former Nazis.

While Kraus and Reimann (who himself had been active in the resistance against the Nazis) envisioned a liberal and moderately nationalist party, an alternative to the dominant SPÖ and ÖVP, appealing to the educated middle- and upper middle-class, VdU in fact became a rallying point for former National Socialists. More than 500,000 former members of the Nazi Party or other Nazi organisations had been excluded from the 1945 elections. By 1947 however, more than 90 percent of them were categorised as mere "followers" who regained their right to vote and, thanks to an amnesty in 1948, also their right to be elected. According to the FPÖ party historian Kurt Piringer, Kraus "reached into the void" when he tried "to pick up on the remnants of the old liberalism to re-establish the third camp", as this liberal camp was at that time non-existent in Austria.

== Electoral success and decline ==
In the 1949 legislative election the VdU obtained 11.7% of the vote and won 16 seats in the National Council. The SPÖ's strategy of creating a split in the non-Socialist vote failed, with both the SPÖ and the ÖVP losing equally to the VdU. The party drew most of its support in areas where in pre-war times the rural Landbund had been rooted and in cities with a high percentage of former Nazis. At the 1953 legislative election, its share of the vote fell slightly to 10.9% and 14 seats in the National Council.

Beginning soon after its foundation, the party saw the start of heavy internal strife between the more liberal approach of the founders Kraus and Reimann and the German nationalist faction centering on the former Luftwaffe colonel Gordon Gollob. This led to the collapse of the party, which was absorbed by the newly founded Freedom Party of Austria (FPÖ) of former SS brigadier Anton Reinthaller in 1956. VdU founders Reimann and Kraus left the FPÖ shortly thereafter and the latter lamented over a "long-prepared seizure of power by a small circle of right-wing extremists and Nazi leaders". Nevertheless, there was a strong continuity, as 5 of 6 MPs of the FPÖ elected in 1956 had previously been members of VdU.

== Notable members ==
- Gordon Gollob
- Friedrich Peter
- Lothar Rendulic
