= 1945 Austrian legislative election =

- 25 November 1945

All 165 seats in the National Council of Austria 83 seats needed for a majority
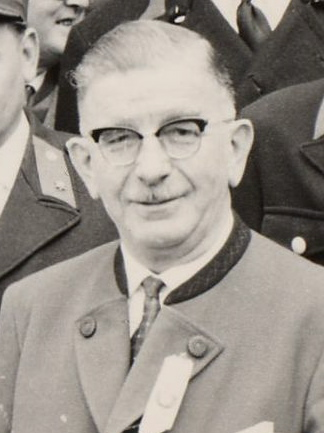

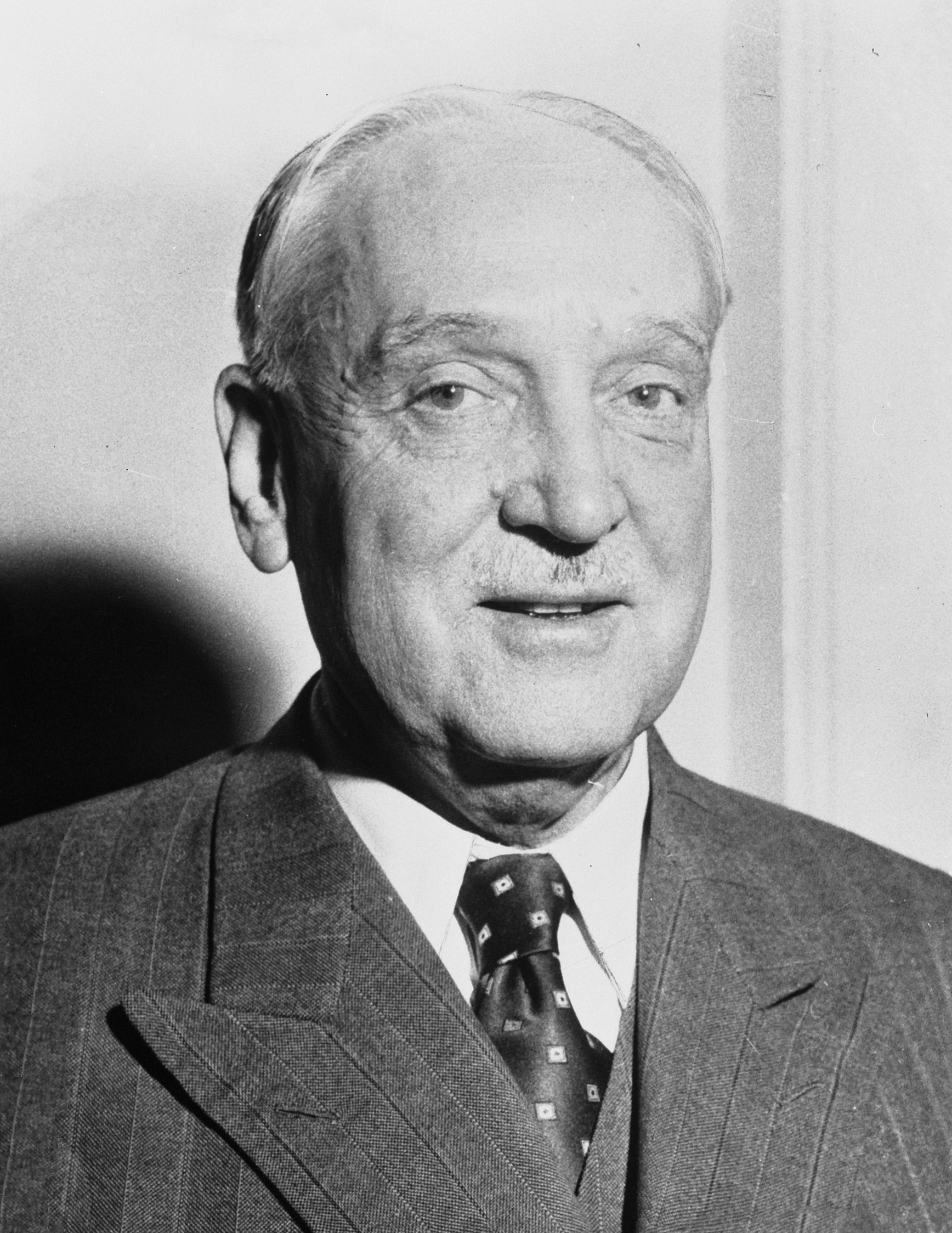

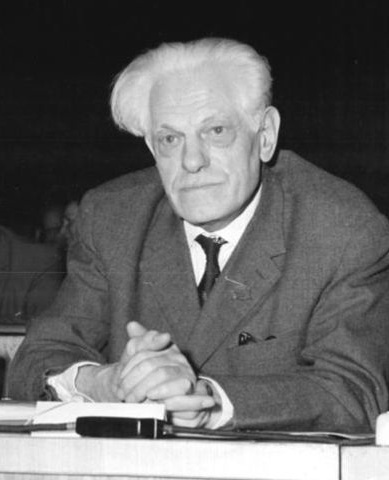
	First party	Second party	Third party
Leader	Leopold Figl	Adolf Schärf	Johann Koplenig
Party	ÖVP	SPÖ	KPÖ
Seats won	85	76	4
Popular vote	1,602,227	1,434,898	174,257
Percentage	49.80%	44.60%	5.42%
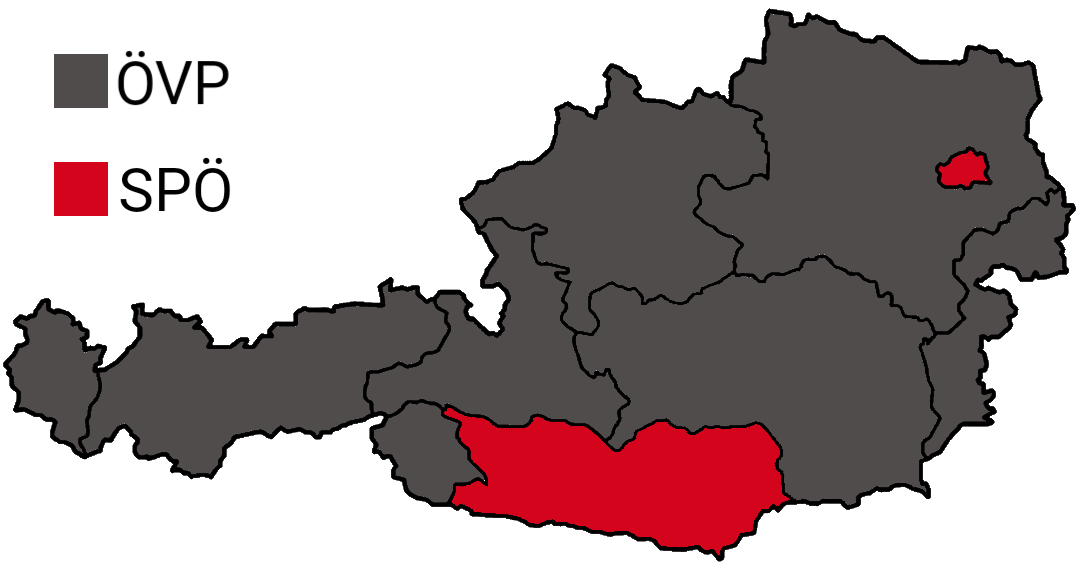
Chancellor before election
Karl Renner (Acting)
SPÖ
Elected Chancellor
Leopold Figl
ÖVP

Parliamentary elections were held in Austria on 25 November 1945, the first after World War II. The elections were held according to the Austrian election law of 1929, with all citizens at least 21 years old eligible to vote; however, former Nazis were banned from voting, official sources putting their numbers at around 200,000.

The Austrian People's Party, comprising elements of the prewar Christian Social Party under the leadership of Leopold Figl, won a decisive victory, receiving just under half of the vote and 85 of the 165 seats in the National Council. With an outright majority of two seats, the ÖVP could have governed alone. However, Figl retained the three-party grand coalition alongside the Socialists and Communists. The Communists, who had been equally represented in the government of Figl's predecessor, Socialist Karl Renner, since the end of the war, only received one cabinet post.

On 20 December 1945, the Federal Assembly unanimously elected incumbent Chancellor Renner as President. Renner swore in Figl as new chancellor on the same day.

The Communists won only four seats, which some blamed on the conduct of the Red Army in the Soviet-occupied zone of Austria. This proved to be the beginning of a long decline for the Communists, though they stayed in the chamber until May 1959.

== Results ==
Party	Votes	%	Seats
Austrian People's Party	1,602,227	49.80	85
Socialist Party of Austria	1,434,898	44.60	76
Communist Party of Austria	174,257	5.42	4
Democratic Party of Austria	5,972	0.19	0
Total	3,217,354	100.00	165
Valid votes	3,217,354	98.89	
Invalid/blank votes	35,975	1.11	
Total votes	3,253,329	100.00	
Registered voters/turnout	3,449,605	94.31	
Source: Nohlen & Stöver

=== Results by state ===
State	ÖVP	SPÖ	KPÖ	DPÖ
Burgenland	51.7	45.0	3.3	-
Carinthia	39.7	48.9	8.1	3.3
Lower Austria	54.5	40.3	5.2	-
Upper Austria	59.0	38.3	2.6	-
Salzburg	56.6	39.6	3.8	-
Styria	52.9	41.7	5.4	-
Tyrol	71.3	26.5	2.2	-
Vorarlberg	69.9	27.6	2.5	-
Vienna	34.5	57.4	8.0	-
Austria	49.8	44.6	5.4	0.2
Source: Institute for Social Research and Consulting (SORA)
