= 1953 Austrian legislative election =

- 22 February 1953

All 165 seats in the National Council of Austria 83 seats needed for a majority
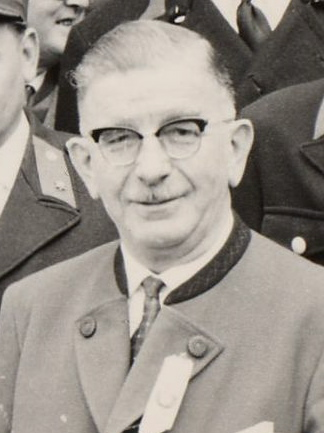

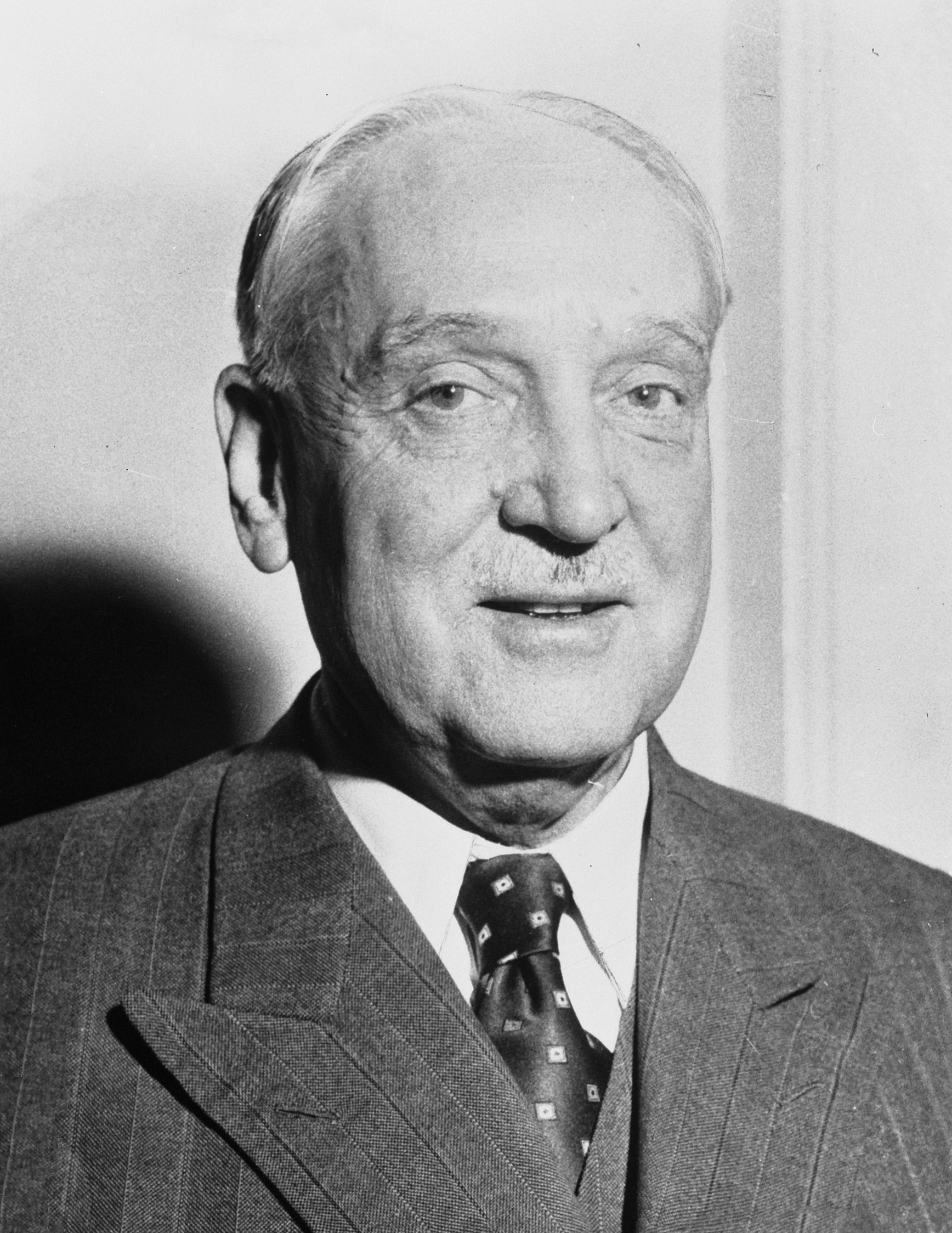

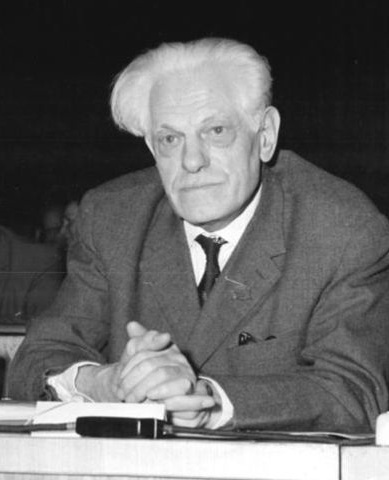
	First party	Second party
Leader	Leopold Figl	Adolf Schärf
Party	ÖVP	SPÖ
Last election	44.03%, 77 seats	38.71%, 67 seats
Seats won	74	73
Seat change	▼3	▲6
Popular vote	1,781,777	1,818,517
Percentage	41.26%	42.11%
Swing	▼2.77 pp	▲3.40 pp
	Third party	Fourth party
Leader	Herbert Kraus	Johann Koplenig
Party	VdU	KPÖ
Leader since	25 March 1949
Last election	11.67%, 16 seats	5.08%, 5 seats
Seats won	14	4
Seat change	▼2	▼1
Popular vote	472,866	228,159
Percentage	10.95%	5.28%
Swing	▼0.72 pp	▲0.20 pp
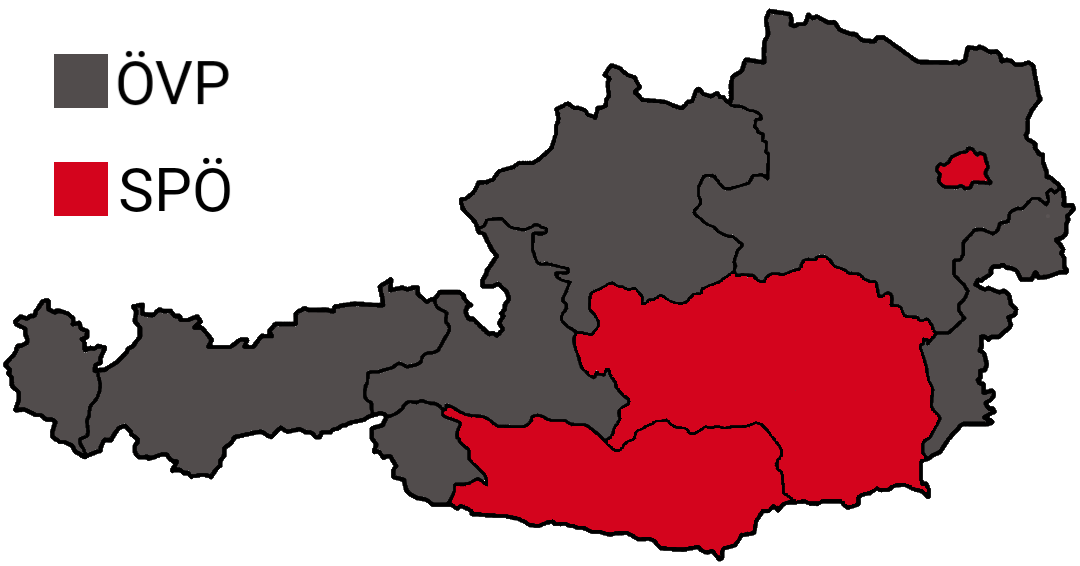
Chancellor before election
Leopold Figl
ÖVP
Elected Chancellor
Julius Raab
ÖVP

Parliamentary elections were held in Austria on 22 February 1953. They were the elections in which the Socialist Party received the most votes since 1920. However, the Austrian People's Party won the most seats. The grand coalition between the two parties was continued with Julius Raab replacing Leopold Figl as Chancellor of Austria, who had had to resign after facing criticism from his own party, and Adolf Schärf of the Socialist Party remaining Vice Chancellor.

== Results ==
Party	Votes	%	Seats	+/–
Socialist Party of Austria	1,818,517	42.11	73	+6
Austrian People's Party	1,781,777	41.26	74	–3
Electoral Party of Independents	472,866	10.95	14	–2
Austrian People's Opposition	228,159	5.28	4	–1
Bipartisan Agreement of the Centre	5,809	0.13	0	New
Christian Democratic Party	3,668	0.08	0	New
Christian Social Party and Non-Party Personalities	3,029	0.07	0	New
Free Democrats	2,573	0.06	0	New
Association of Austrian Monarchists	1,210	0.03	0	New
Austrian National Republicans and Independents	1,054	0.02	0	New
Austrian Patriotic Party	26	0.00	0	0
Total	4,318,688	100.00	165	0
Valid votes	4,318,688	98.25		
Invalid/blank votes	76,831	1.75		
Total votes	4,395,519	100.00		
Registered voters/turnout	4,586,870	95.83		
Source: Nohlen & Stöver

=== Results by state ===
State	SPÖ	ÖVP	WdU	VO	Others
Burgenland	44.7	48.3	3.7	3.2	0.5
Carinthia	48.1	28.8	16.6	4.1	2.3
Lower Austria	39.0	50.2	4.8	5.8	0.1
Upper Austria	38.4	46.2	12.2	3.0	0.2
Salzburg	35.2	42.3	18.9	2.8	0.8
Styria	41.1	40.7	13.6	4.4	0.2
Tyrol	29.2	55.1	13.1	2.4	0.2
Vorarlberg	22.7	55.5	18.8	2.9	0.1
Vienna	50.0	31.1	10.5	8.1	0.5
Austria	42.1	41.3	11.0	5.3	0.4
Source: Institute for Social Research and Consulting (SORA)
