= Democratic Party of Austria =

Democratic Party of Austria Demokratische Partei Österreichs
- Leader: Franz Knapitsch; Josef Ostertschnig
- Founded: 14 July 1945
- Dissolved: 1949
- Headquarters: Klagenfurt
- Newspaper: Der Demokratie; Montags-Kurier
- Ideology: Liberalism; Regionalism

The Democratic Party of Austria (German: Demokratische Partei Österreichs; DPÖ), was a short-lived political party in Austria between 1945 and 1949.

== History ==
The Democratic Party of Austria was founded on 14 July 1945 as a liberal party focused on the regional development of Carinthia.

Although the party had a liberal program, it was made up of liberals, monarchistic Habsburg Royalists and National Socialists. This ideological clash was one of the main reasons for the failure of the party.

In 1946, several members were arrested because they were members of the NSDAP and the SS. The party then tried to get rid of the Nazi wing, but this remained in place until the end of the party.

In the 1949 Austrian legislative election, the leadership of the party endorsed the Austrian People's Party and subsequently dissolved.

The National Socialists switched to the FPÖ or are no longer politically active. The Liberals switched to the SPÖ and monarchistic Royalists switched to the ÖVP.
