= Rudolf Streicher =

Austrian politician (born 1939)

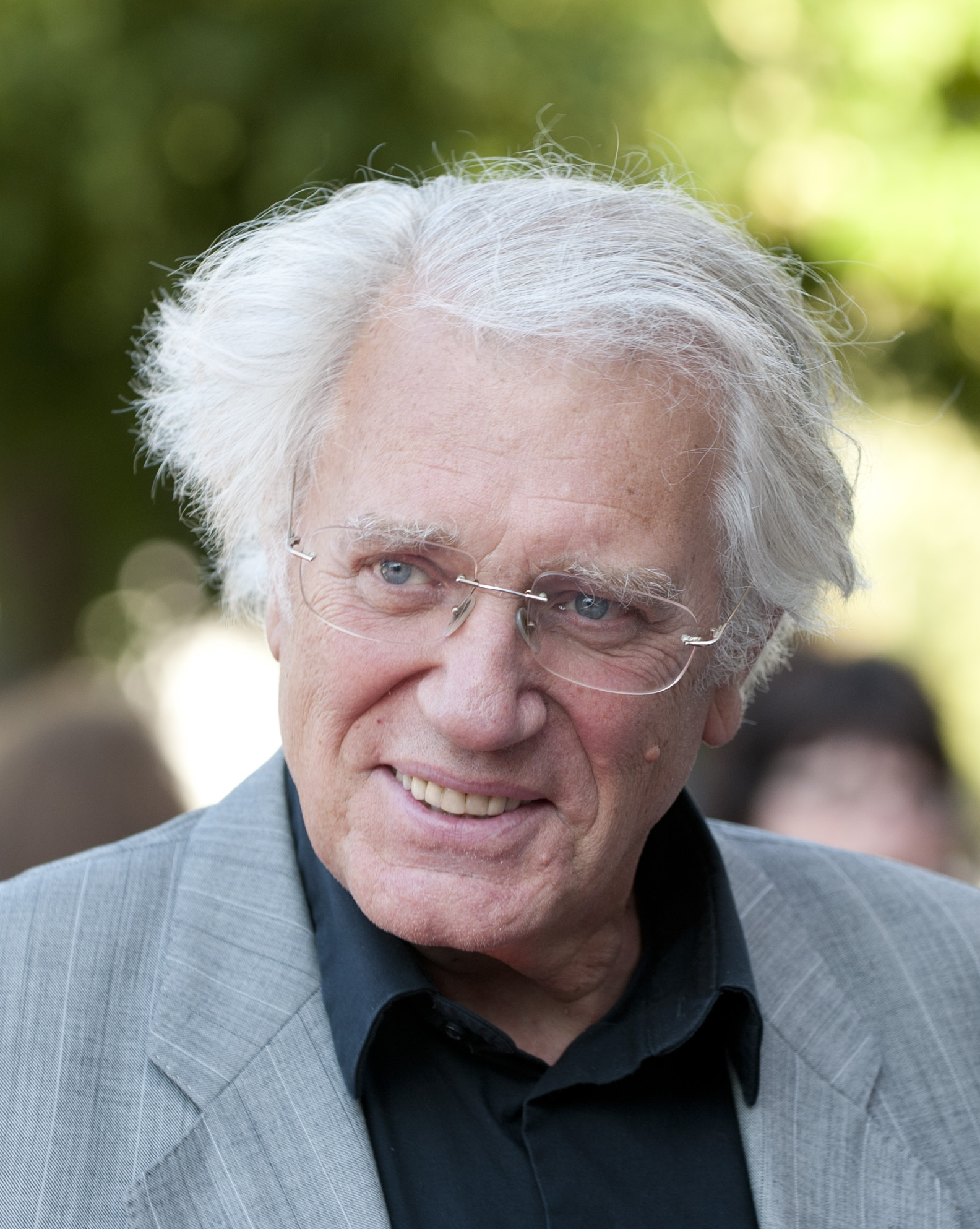
- Streicher in 2011

Minister of the Public Economy and Transport
- In office 16 June 1986 – 3 April 1992
- Chancellor: Franz Vranitzky
- Preceded by: Ferdinand Lacina
- Succeeded by: Viktor Klima

Personal details
- Born: 19 January 1939 (age 87) Wallsee-Sindelburg, Austria
- Party: Social Democratic Party of Austria
- Profession: politician

Rudolf Streicher (born 19 January 1939) is an Austrian former politician. He served in the government of Austria as Minister of Transport and Economy from June 1986 to April 1992. Streicher is a member of the Social Democratic Party of Austria (SPÖ).

== Life and career ==
Born in Wallsee-Sindelburg, Streicher was an apprentice in the Voest Alpine AG. He later attended the University of Leoben. While studying in Leoben he also studied Music at the Anton Bruckner Private University for Music in Linz. From 1974 to 1980 he was a board member of the Vereinigte Metallwerke Ranshofen Berndorf AG. In addition, he was chief executive officer of AMAG Austria Metall AG from 1981 to 1986.

In 1986 Streicher became Minister of the Public Economy and Transport (German: Bundesminister für öffentliche Wirtschaft und Verkehr) under Chancellor Franz Vranitzky. He held this position in three Vranitzky cabinets and stood down in 1992 to seek the Presidency in which he was widely considered the front-runner. Streicher won the first round with a margin of more than three percents, but he did not gain enough votes to avoid a runoff election. However, he lost the second round of the election in 1992 to Thomas Klestil and subsequently retired from active politics.

After his political career, he was chief executive officer of Steyr-Daimler-Puch from 1992 to 1998 and of the Austrian State and Industrial Holding Ltd from 1999 to 2001. Streicher was also the president of FK Austria Wien from 1997 to October 1999.

He also worked as a conductor and played with the Wiener Philharmoniker. Streicher is married and father of one daughter. Streicher became an honorary professor at the University of Leoben.
