= Roman Karl Scholz =

Austrian priest

Roman Scholz
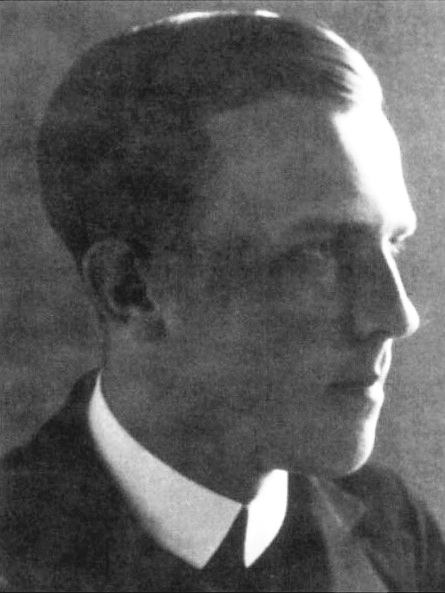
- Born: Karl Scholz; 16 January 1912; Mährisch Schönberg, Moravia, Austro-Hungarian empire
- Died: 10 May 1944 (aged 32); District Courthouse, Vienna, Germany
- Education: Klosterneuburg Monastery
- Occupations: Author; Augustinian canon regular Teacher
- Known for: Resistance activism and execution
- Parent: Josefa Scholz (mother)

Roman Karl Scholz (16 January 1912 – 10 May 1944) was an Austrian author and Augustinian canon regular at Klosterneuburg. He became a resistance activist after attending a Nuremberg Rally in 1936. He was arrested in 1941 and executed in 1944.

== Early life ==
The illegitimate son of a textile worker, Josefa Scholz, Karl Scholz was born in Mährisch Schönberg (now Šumperk), a prosperous manufacturing town in the northern part of Moravia, in Austria-Hungary. When he was six, Austria-Hungary was broken up and his home town was transferred to the new republic of Czechoslovakia. It remained overwhelmingly German in terms of language and ethnicity, but in a period of heightened nationalism, the growth of the Czech-speaking minority became a source of tension, and it was part of the regions which politicians were beginning to identify as the Sudetenland.

Scholz grew up with his grandparents, and attended the Gymnasium (secondary school) in his home town. As a schoolboy he joined a local Catholic youth group, becoming a group leader. Sources relate that he wrote poems, loved nature and took an interest in politics. He also "fell under the spell" of those advocating nationalist solutions to the Sudeten-German issue, which increasingly became identified with the idea that the Sudetenland should be transferred from Czechoslovakia to Germany in deference to the principle of self-determination, which had been proclaimed as a guiding principal for reconfiguring the political map by the victorious governments in 1918/19.

In 1930, he entered Klosterneuburg Monastery as a novice canon regular, taking the "religious" additional name, "Roman". He completed his probationary period and was ordained into the priesthood in 1936. Between 1936 and 1938, he was employed as a chaplain in the Heiligenstadt district of northern Vienna. In 1938, he started working as a teacher of religion at the Gymnasium in Klosterneuburg, and from 1939, he taught Christian Philosophy at the monastery's own school. He was also employed as a priest for the military centre in the town after war broke out at the end of the summer.

== Resistance activities ==
As a young man, like many who had grown up with the Christian Youth movement in Sudetenland, Scholz was drawn to Nazism, and attended a party rally at Nuremberg in the summer of 1936. The experience proved a turning point, however, after which he rejected Nazi ideology. In March 1938, Austria was invaded by the German Army and quickly became incorporated into an enlarged Nazi German state. That year, Scholz teamed up with his friend Dr. Viktor Reimann to create the "German Freedom Movement" ("Deutsche Freiheitsbewegung") a resistance group that had an essentially Catholic and conservative character.

After war broke out, in September 1939, the group was renamed, becoming the "Austrian Freedom Movement" ("Österreichische Freiheitsbewegung"). Its political objectives were to educate people about the true nature of National Socialism and to seek the downfall of the Nazi regime. They also sought the re-establishment of an independent Austrian state, which would also incorporate Bavaria, thereby extending northward the way to the River Main. Some of the recruits were drawn from among the older school students whom Scholz taught. In the end, there were around 300-400 members. The movement also incorporated a women's group, organized around Luise Kanitz. There were contacts with the western allies and with Czechoslovak resistance groups.

== Betrayal, arrest and execution ==
Otto Hartmann, an actor from the Vienna Burgtheater, was introduced to the group by his fellow thespian, Fritz Lehmann. Unbeknown to Scholz or Lehmann, Hartmann was a Gestapo spy. Hartmann suggested that the group should embark on a programme of terror and sabotage, but Scholz rejected the idea, which would have run counter to his Christian principles. In June 1940, Hartmann reported everything that the resistance movement had been discussing and planning directly to the Gestapo.

Scholz was arrested at the monastery on 22 July 1940, along with four others. He was held pending trial for more than three years. He was repeatedly interrogated during that period and was transferred several times to prisons both in Vienna and further afield, but he betrayed no accomplices. An intervention by a sister of Reichsmarschall Hermann Göring, with whom a friend of Scholz had a connection, proved fruitless.

Scholz faced the special People's Court in Vienna in February 1943. The indictment stated that he had brought about "the bringing together of people inclined to [political] opposition and drawn them into an organisation hostile to the state, for the purpose of splitting the Greater German realm". A public defender was assigned to his case and entered an "extenuating circumstances" plea that Scholz was a fantasist, but did not contest his guilt. Scholz was condemned to death on 23 February 1943. Cardinal Archbishop Innitzer of Vienna submitted a personal plea for clemency by telegramme to Adolf Hitler, who failed to reply.

Scholz was one of approximately twenty resistance activists executed by guillotine on the scaffold at the district courthouse in Vienna on 10 May 1944. His final words were "Für Christus und Österreich!" (For Christ and Austria!).
