= Proletář =

Proletář was a publication issued in Brno, Moravia. It began publishing in 1910. Politically it adhered to the line of the Austrian Social Democratic Party. Proletář issued attacks against the Czechoslav Social Democratic Labour Party and the Czechoslav Trade Union Association. The magazine folded in 1914.
