= Salzburger Nachrichten =

Austrian daily newspaper

- Type: Daily newspaper
- Format: Broadsheet
- Owner: Salzburger Nachrichten Verlag
- Publisher: Maximilian Dasch, Jr.
- Founded: 25 October 1945; 80 years ago
- Political alignment: Christian-liberal; Conservative
- Language: German
- Headquarters: Salzburg
- Country: Austria
- Website: www.sn.at

The Salzburger Nachrichten is a German-language daily newspaper published in Salzburg, Austria. It has been in circulation since 1945.

== History and profile ==
Salzburger Nachrichten was established in 1945 by the American forces occupying Austria following World War II. The first issue appeared on 25 October that year. It remained under the control of the US Information Services Branch for a long time. When the paper became under the Austrian supervision, its early contributors were Viktor Reimann, Ilse Leitenberger and Alfons Dalma who were affiliated with the anti-Fascist groups during World War II. In the post-war period Salzburger Nachrichten focused on provincial events and news and did not exclusively cover significant events of the period such as the trials of the Nazi figures in Nuremberg.

Salzburger Nachrichten is owned by a family company, Salzburger Nachrichten Verlag. Its publisher is Maximilian Dasch Jr, and its headquarters is in Salzburg which was designed by the Italian architect Gio Ponti. As of 2002, the paper was one of four quality daily newspapers with nationwide distribution along with Der Standard, Die Presse, and Wiener Zeitung.

Salzburger Nachrichten is published from Monday to Saturday in broadsheet format. The paper features daily science and technology news. It has a Christian-liberal and conservative stance.

== Circulation ==
The circulation of Salzburger Nachrichten was 98,000 copies in 2002. The paper had a circulation of 99,123 copies in 2003. Next year its circulation was 96,000 copies in 2004.

Its readership was 38% in 2006. The paper sold 98,000 copies in 2007. Its circulation was 94,329 copies in 2008 and 91,352 copies in 2009. The circulation of the paper was 86,494 copies in 2010. The paper sold 69,867 copies in 2011. The 2013 circulation of the paper was 79,000 copies.
