= Gernot Darmann =

Austrian politician (born 1975)

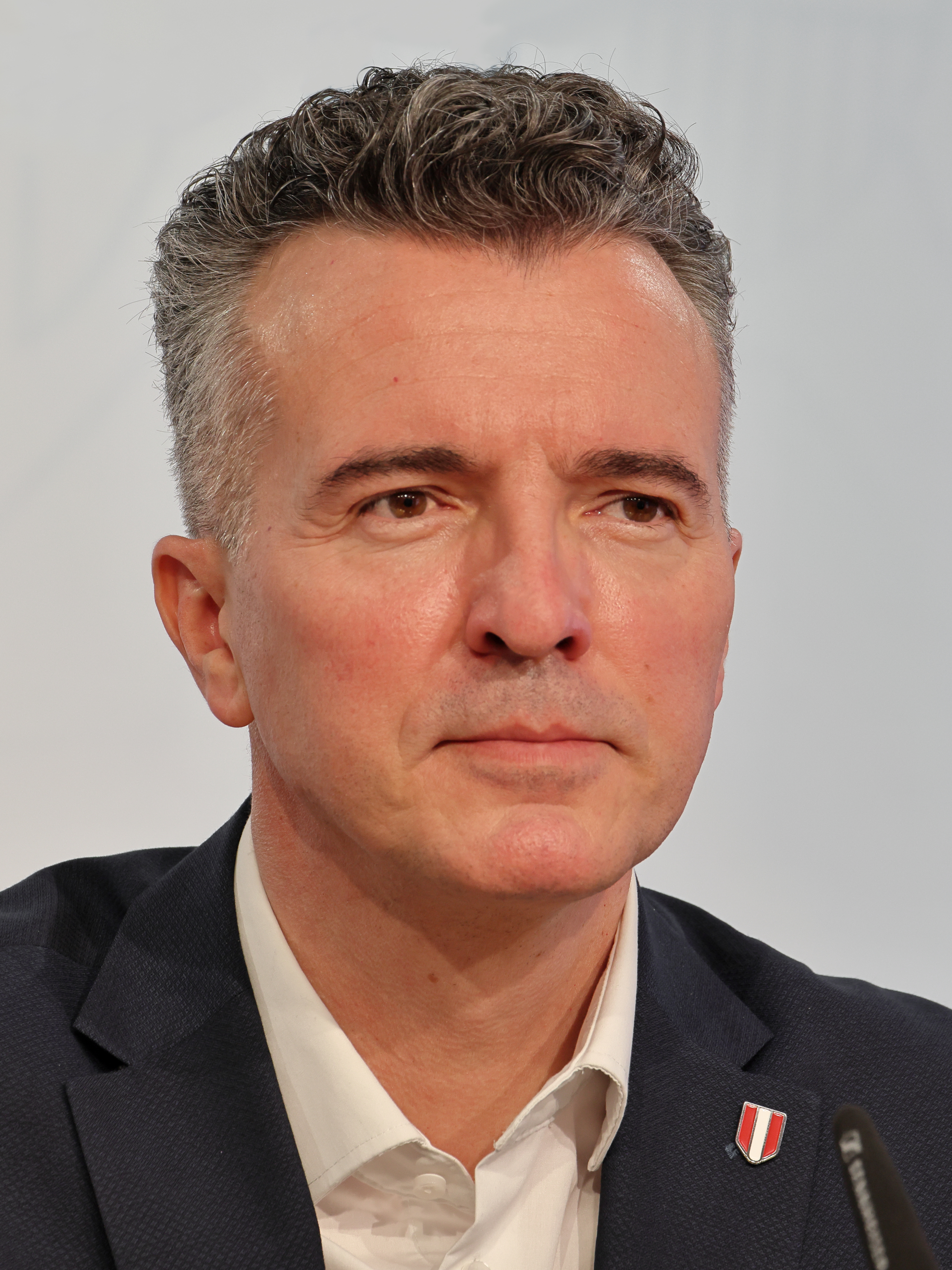
- Darmann in 2026

Member of the National Council
- Incumbent
- Assumed office 24 October 2024
- In office 24 April 2013 – 22 June 2016
- Preceded by: Elisabeth Kaufmann-Bruckberger
- Succeeded by: David Lasar
- Constituency: Federal list (2013, 2014–2016); Carinthia (2013–2014)
- In office 30 October 2006 – 30 March 2009
- Succeeded by: Martin Strutz
- Constituency: Klagenfurt

Personal details
- Born: 7 July 1975 (age 50) Graz, Austria
- Party: Freedom Party
- Other political affiliations: Alliance for the Future of Austria (2006–2009)

Gernot Darmann (born 7 July 1975) is an Austrian politician of the Freedom Party. He was elected member of the National Council in the 2024 legislative election, and previously served from 2006 to 2009 and from 2013 to 2016. From 2016 to 2021, he was the leader of the Freedom Party in Carinthia.
