= 1992 Austrian presidential election =

- 26 April 1992 (first round); 24 May 1992 (second round)
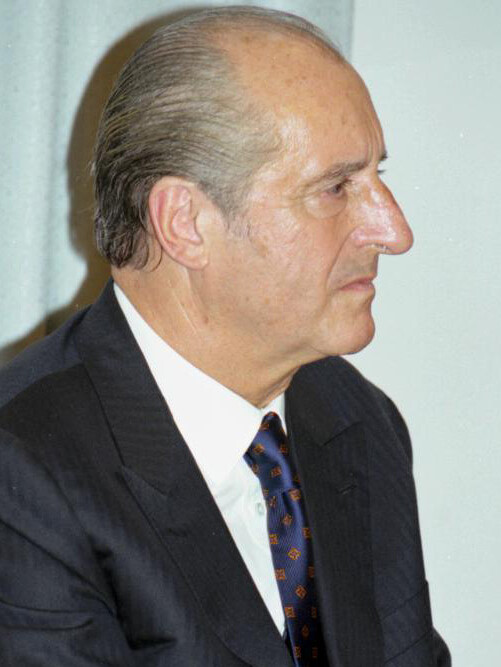

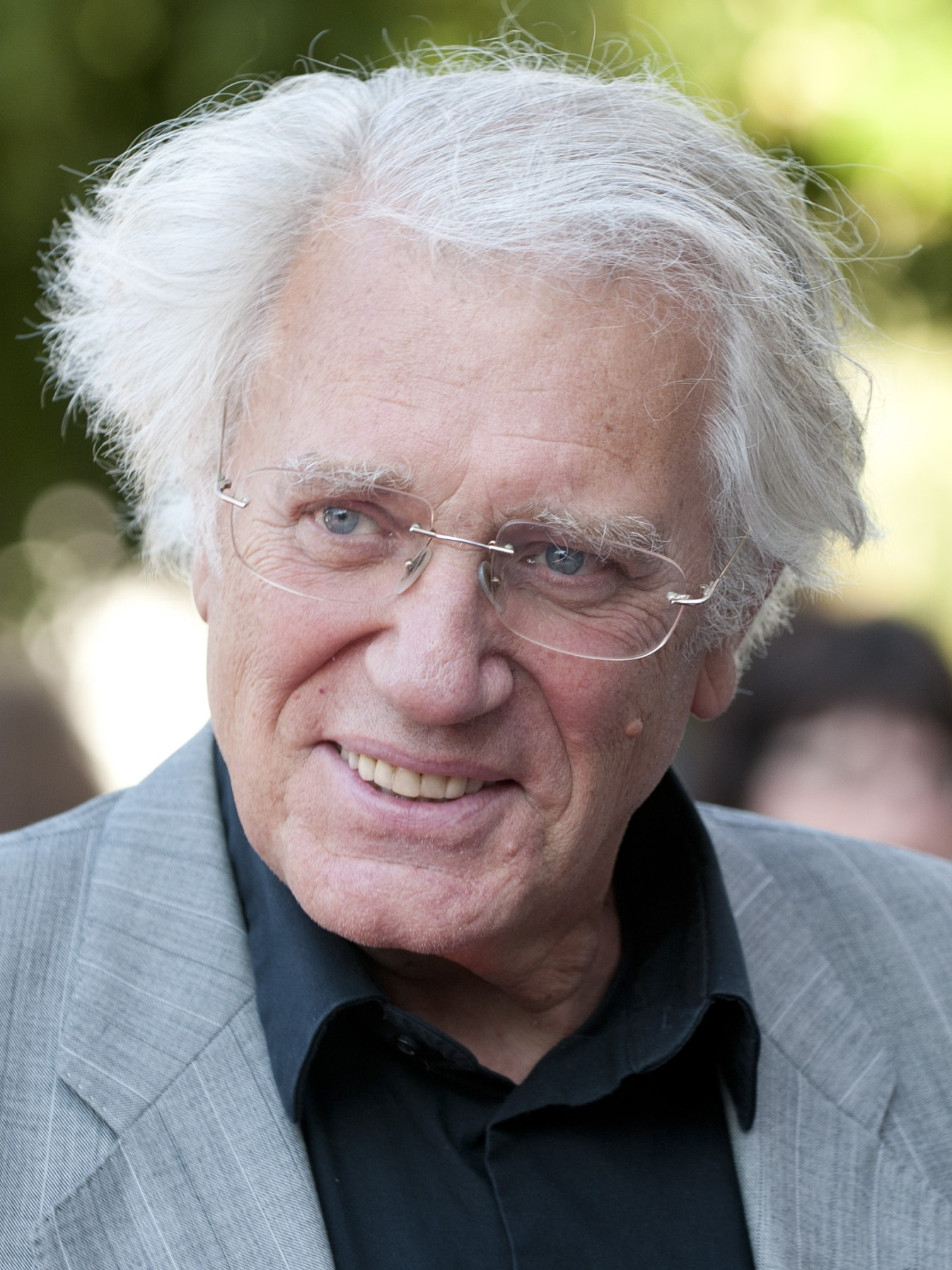
| Nominee | Thomas Klestil | Rudolf Streicher |
| Party | Independent (ÖVP) | SPÖ |
| Popular vote | 2,528,006 | 1,915,380 |
| Percentage | 56.89% | 43.11% |
President before election
Kurt Waldheim
Independent (ÖVP)
Elected President
Thomas Klestil
Independent (ÖVP)

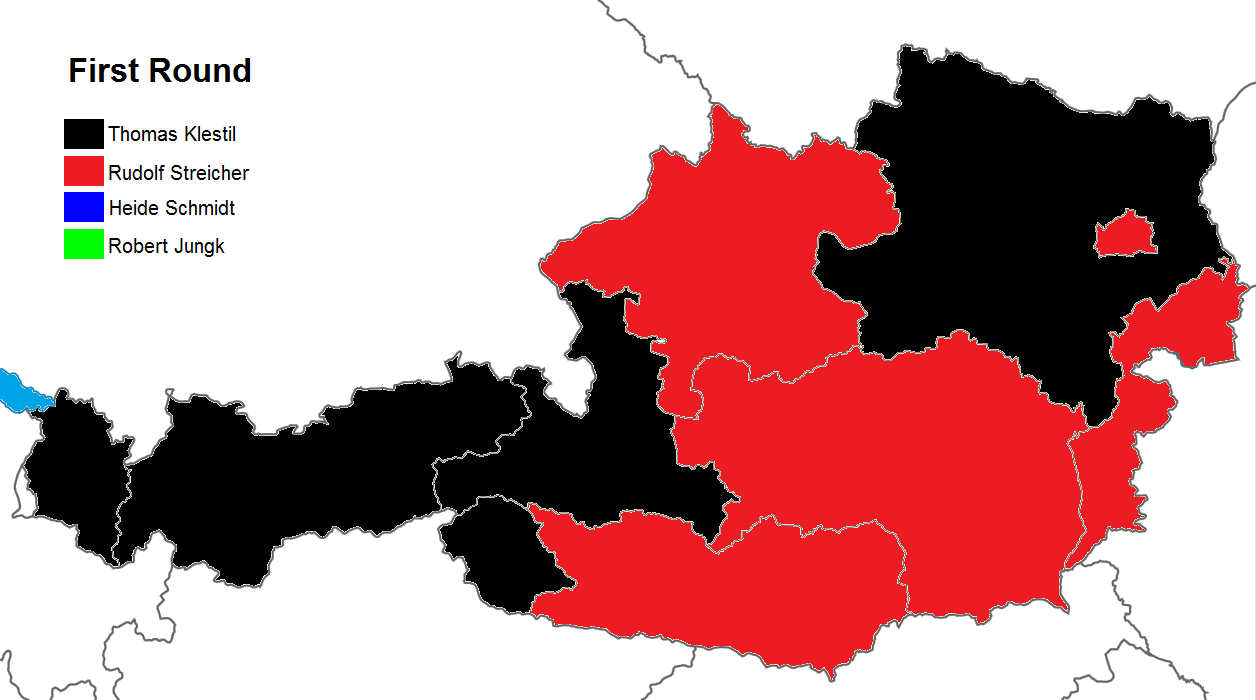
Results by state Thomas Klestil Rudolf Streicher Heide Schmidt Robert Jungk

Presidential elections were held in Austria on 26 April 1992, with a second round held on 24 May 1992 after no candidate won a majority in the first round. Incumbent president Kurt Waldheim did not seek reelection as he had not gained acceptance in the international community. The strongest party at that time, the Social Democratic Party, proposed the current minister of traffic and nationalized industries, Rudolf Streicher, for the office, while the Austrian People's Party put up career diplomat Thomas Klestil. Streicher won the first ballot by a small margin, but did not obtain the necessary majority of votes to avoid a second round. However, with the candidates of the smaller parties out in the second ballot, and after a recommendation by Jörg Haider to vote for Klestil, the latter won the second round by an unexpectedly wide margin.

== Results ==
| Candidate | Party | First round | | Second round | |
| Candidate | Party | Votes | % | Votes | % |
|---|---|---|---|---|---|
| Rudolf Streicher | Social Democratic Party of Austria | 1,888,599 | 40.66 | 1,915,380 | 43.11 |
| Thomas Klestil | Independent (ÖVP) | 1,728,234 | 37.20 | 2,528,006 | 56.89 |
| Heide Schmidt | Freedom Party of Austria | 761,390 | 16.39 | | |
| Robert Jungk | Green Party | 266,954 | 5.75 | | |
| Total | | 4,645,177 | 100.00 | 4,443,386 | 100.00 |
| Valid votes | | 4,645,177 | 97.00 | 4,443,386 | 96.74 |
| Invalid/blank votes | | 143,717 | 3.00 | 149,546 | 3.26 |
| Total votes | | 4,788,894 | 100.00 | 4,592,932 | 100.00 |
| Registered voters/turnout | | 5,676,903 | 84.36 | 5,676,903 | 80.91 |
Source: Ministry of Interior

=== Results by state ===
==== First round ====
| State | Rudolf Streicher | Thomas Klestil | Heide Schmidt | Robert Jungk | Electorate | Votes | Valid votes | Invalid votes |
|---|---|---|---|---|---|---|---|---|
| Burgenland | 90,054 | 71,678 | 21,445 | 4,923 | 207,835 | 192,453 | 188,100 | 4,353 |
| Lower Austria | 386,625 | 408,172 | 119,741 | 36,325 | 1,089,930 | 975,270 | 950,863 | 24,410 |
| Wien | 353,403 | 239,388 | 109,593 | 64,564 | 1,129,365 | 782,192 | 766,948 | 15,244 |
| Kärnten | 149,860 | 84,771 | 102,424 | 13,236 | 411,862 | 363,192 | 350,291 | 12,901 |
| Steiermark | 325,276 | 277,035 | 138,167 | 36,259 | 890,544 | 809,965 | 776,737 | 33,228 |
| Upper Austria | 310,130 | 292,000 | 117,235 | 43,602 | 952,581 | 781,316 | 762,967 | 18,349 |
| Salzburg | 92,084 | 97,786 | 49,028 | 20,413 | 338,378 | 266,449 | 259,311 | 7,138 |
| Tirol | 118,811 | 165,314 | 61,895 | 25,776 | 441,894 | 388,706 | 371,796 | 16,910 |
| Vorarlberg | 50,855 | 80,676 | 37,794 | 18,549 | 214,514 | 198,681 | 187,874 | 10,807 |
Source: European Election Database

==== Second round ====
| State | Thomas Klestil | Rudolf Streicher | Electorate | Votes | Valid votes | Invalid votes |
|---|---|---|---|---|---|---|
| Burgenland | 97,021 | 94,162 | 207,835 | 195,365 | 191,183 | 4,182 |
| Lower Austria | 547,575 | 390,786 | 1,089,930 | 961,465 | 938,361 | 23,104 |
| Wien | 345,561 | 339,297 | 1,129,365 | 699,697 | 684,858 | 14,839 |
| Kärnten | 181,398 | 157,704 | 411,862 | 353,801 | 339,102 | 14,699 |
| Steiermark | 419,516 | 334,744 | 890,544 | 790,280 | 754,260 | 36,020 |
| Upper Austria | 414,159 | 315,767 | 952,581 | 749,071 | 729,926 | 19,145 |
| Salzburg | 144,453 | 93,779 | 338,378 | 244,483 | 238,232 | 6,251 |
| Tirol | 234,347 | 117,644 | 441,894 | 369,721 | 351,991 | 17,730 |
| Vorarlberg | 121,286 | 57,544 | 214,514 | 191,898 | 178,830 | 13,068 |
Source: European Election Database
