= Eva-Maria Holzleitner =

Austrian politician (born 1993)

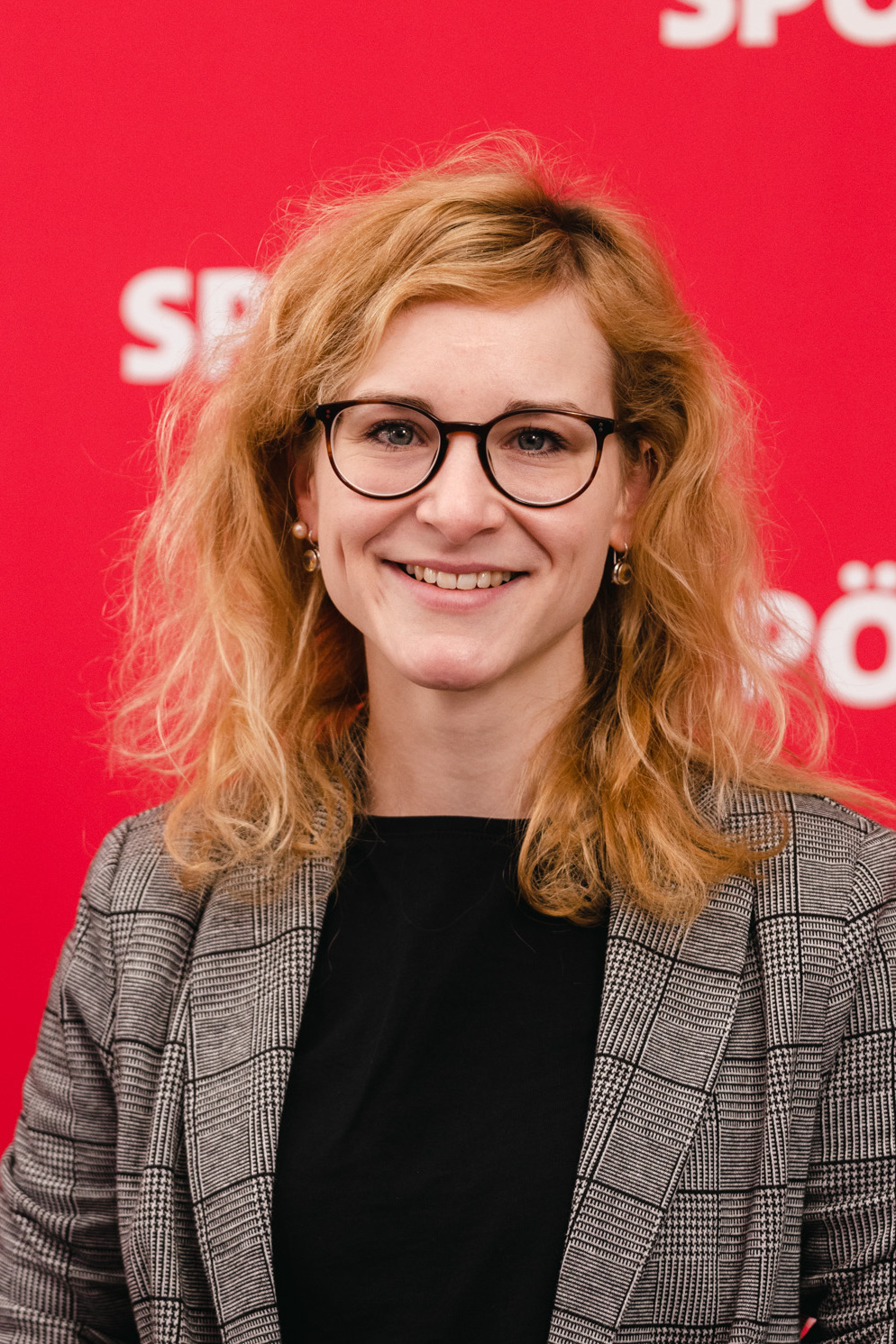
- Holzleitner in 2023

Minister for women, science and research
- Incumbent
- Assumed office 3 March 2025

Member of the National Council
- Incumbent
- Assumed office 9 November 2017
- Constituency: Upper Austria

Personal details
- Born: 5 May 1993 (age 33) Wels, Austria
- Party: Social Democratic Party (since 2012)
- Education: Johannes Kepler University Linz

Eva-Maria Holzleitner (born 5 May 1993) is an Austrian politician of the Social Democratic Party (SPÖ) who has served as Minister for Women, Science and Research in the Stocker government since 2025. She was first elected to the National Council in the 2017 legislative election, and was re-elected in the 2019 election. Since 2021, she has served as a deputy leader of the Social Democratic Party and as leader of its women's wing SPÖ Frauen.

== Career ==
Eva-Maria Holzleitner attended the Bruckner Grammar School (Brucknergymnasium) in Wels from 2003, where she served as deputy head girl and graduated in 2011. She studied Social Economics at the Johannes Kepler University Linz (JKU), where she earned a Bachelor of Science degree in 2016. Alongside her studies, she worked as a student assistant at JKU until February 2016. She was employed at the University of Applied Sciences in Hagenberg from 2015 as an assistant in the HEAL (Heuristic and Evolutionary Algorithms Laboratory) research group.

She joined the SPÖ-affiliated Aktion kritischer Schüler innen (AKS) during her school years and became a member of the SPÖ in 2012. Holzleitner has held various positions within the SPÖ, including serving as the chair of the SPÖ's youth wing in Upper Austria (Junge Generation, JG) from 2016 to 2021. She was elected to the National Council on November 9, 2017, and was re-elected in 2019.

In parliament, she has been the spokesperson for children and youth in the SPÖ parliamentary group during the 26th and 27th legislative periods. She also served on the committee investigating the alleged corruption of the previous government (Ibiza Committee).

Holzleitner was elected Chairwoman of the SPÖ Women in June 2021. She was later elected one of the six deputies of the SPÖ Party Leader, Pamela Rendi-Wagner, with 97.3% of the vote.

In 2023, under SPÖ leader Andreas Babler, she became Deputy Head of the Parliamentary Group. She was also confirmed as SPÖ Women's Chair with 97% of the vote in November 2023. She was the SPÖ's lead candidate for the 2024 National Council election in Upper Austria.

On March 3, 2025, Holzleitner was appointed Minister for Women, Science, and Research in the Stocker government.
