= Elisabeth Scheucher-Pichler =

Austrian politician (born 1954)

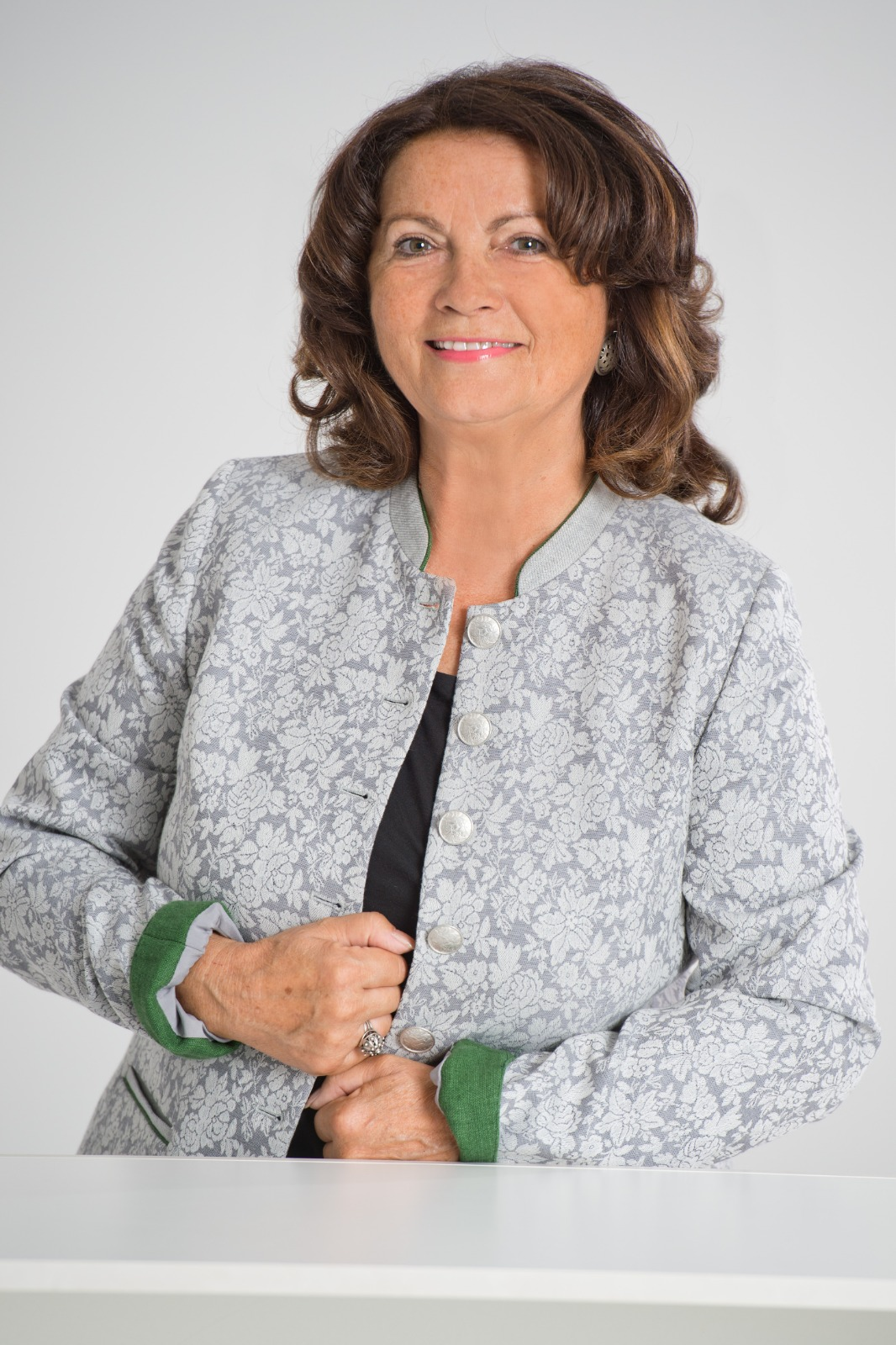
- Scheucher-Pichler in 2020

Member of the National Council
- Incumbent
- Assumed office 23 October 2019
- Constituency: Klagenfurt (2019–2024); Carinthia (2024–present)
- In office 20 December 2002 – 29 October 2006

Personal details
- Born: 28 February 1954 (age 72)
- Party: People's Party

Elisabeth Scheucher-Pichler (born 28 February 1954) is an Austrian politician of the People's Party. She has been a member of the National Council since 2019, having previously served from 2002 to 2006. From 1999 to 2002, she was a member of the Carinthian Landtag.
