= 1949 Austrian legislative election =

- 9 October 1949

165 seats in the National Council of Austria 83 seats needed for a majority
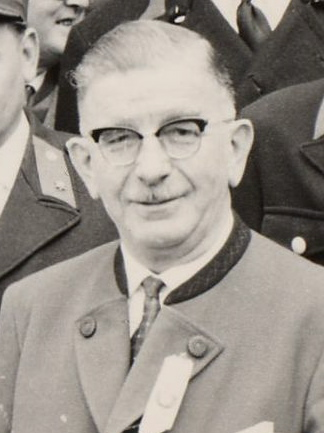

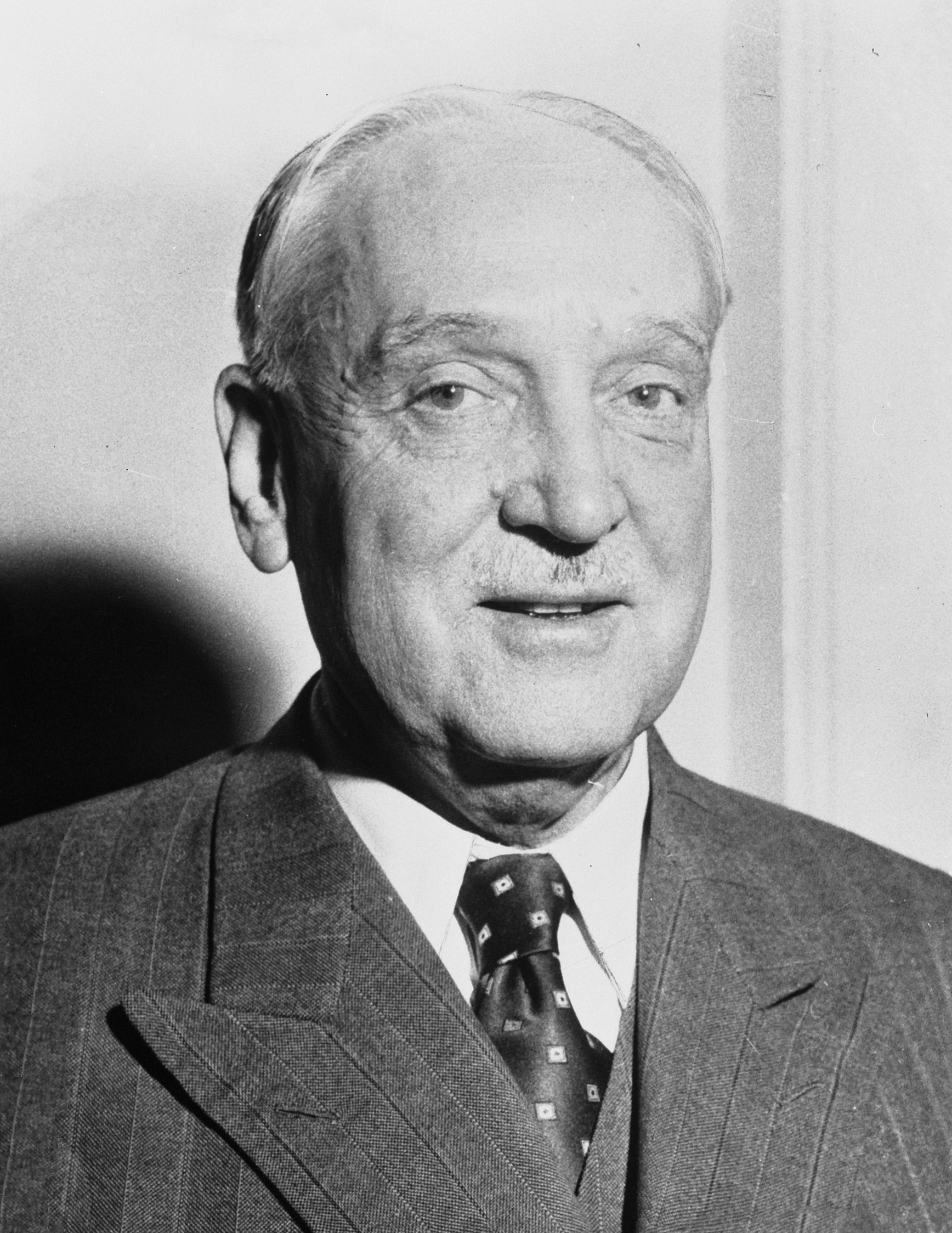

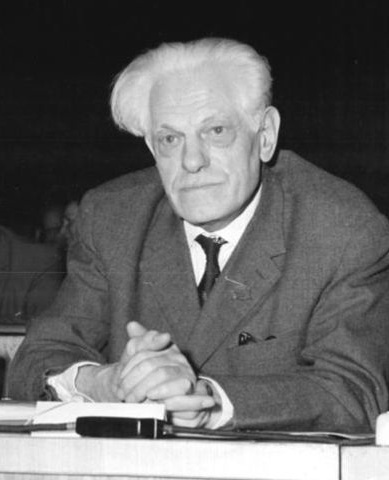
	First party	Second party
Leader	Leopold Figl	Adolf Schärf
Party	ÖVP	SPÖ
Last election	49.80%, 85 seats	44.60%, 76 seats
Seats won	77	67
Seat change	▼8	▼9
Popular vote	1,846,581	1,623,524
Percentage	44.03%	38.71%
Swing	▼5.77 pp	▼5.91 pp
	Third party	Fourth party
Leader	Herbert Kraus	Johann Koplenig
Party	VdU	KPÖ
Last election	–	5.42%, 4 seats
Seats won	16	5
Seat change	New	▲1
Popular vote	489,273	213,066
Percentage	11.67%	5.08%
Swing	New	▼0.34 pp
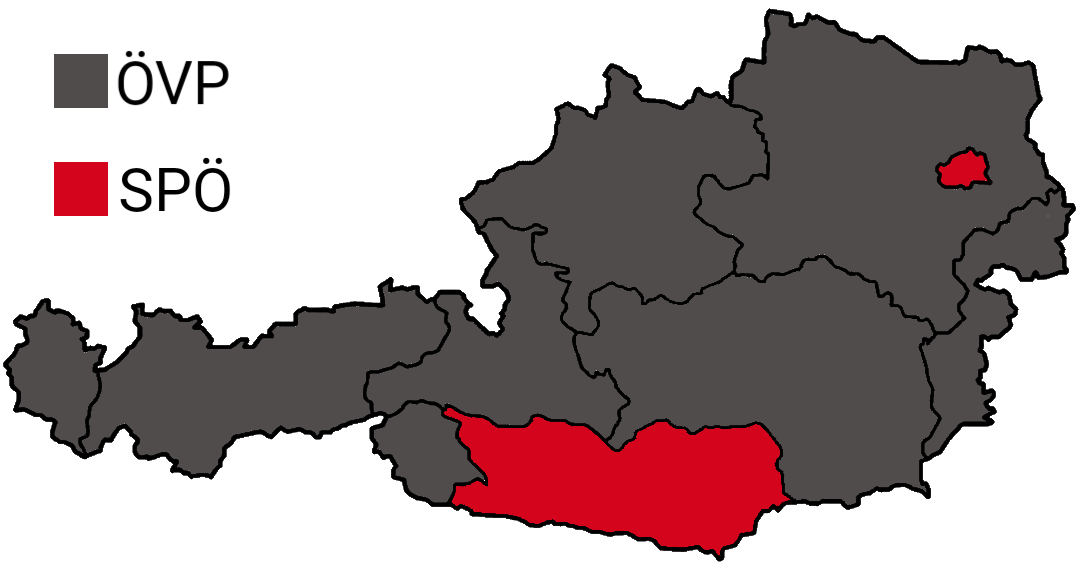
Chancellor before election
Leopold Figl
ÖVP
Elected Chancellor
Leopold Figl
ÖVP

Parliamentary elections were held in Austria on 9 October 1949. About 500,000 registered Nazis, who were not allowed to vote in 1945, regained their voting rights. A newly created party, the Electoral Party of Independents (WdU) (a predecessor of the Freedom Party of Austria) specifically targeted this group of voters and immediately won a large share of votes. The Austrian People's Party remained strongest party, although losing their absolute majority of seats. Leopold Figl stayed as Chancellor, leading a coalition with the Socialist Party of Austria as junior partner.

== Results ==
Party	Votes	%	Seats	+/–
Austrian People's Party	1,846,581	44.03	77	–8
Socialist Party of Austria	1,623,524	38.71	67	–9
Electoral Party of Independents	489,273	11.67	16	New
Communist Party of Austria and Left Socialists	213,066	5.08	5	+1
Democratic Union	12,059	0.29	0	New
Fourth Party	7,134	0.17	0	New
Democratic Front of the Working People	2,088	0.05	0	New
Democratic Party of Austria	5	0.00	0	0
Economic Party of House and Property Owners	3	0.00	0	New
Austrian Patriotic Party	0	0.00	0	New
Total	4,193,733	100.00	165	0
Valid votes	4,193,733	98.66		
Invalid/blank votes	56,883	1.34		
Total votes	4,250,616	100.00		
Registered voters/turnout	4,391,815	96.78		
Source: Nohlen & Stöver

=== Results by state ===
State	ÖVP	SPÖ	WdU	Linksblock	DU	Others
Burgenland	52.6	40.5	3.9	2.9	0.1	0.1
Carinthia	34.0	41.1	20.8	4.1	0.1	-
Lower Austria	54.1	36.2	4.3	5.1	0.1	0.2
Upper Austria	44.9	30.8	20.8	3.1	0.2	0.2
Salzburg	43.7	33.6	18.6	3.3	0.3	0.6
Styria	42.9	37.4	14.5	4.5	0.5	0.1
Tyrol	56.3	23.8	17.4	1.6	0.7	0.2
Vorarlberg	56.4	18.9	21.9	2.4	0.4	-
Vienna	35.5	49.2	6.8	7.9	0.3	0.2
Austria	44.0	38.7	11.7	5.1	0.3	0.2
Source: Institute for Social Research and Consulting (SORA)
