= Kurz government =

Kurz government may refer to two government cabinets in Austria headed by Sebastian Kurz as chancellor:

- the First Kurz government (2017–2019)
- the Second Kurz government (2020–2021)
