= Philip Kucher =

Austrian politician (born 1981)

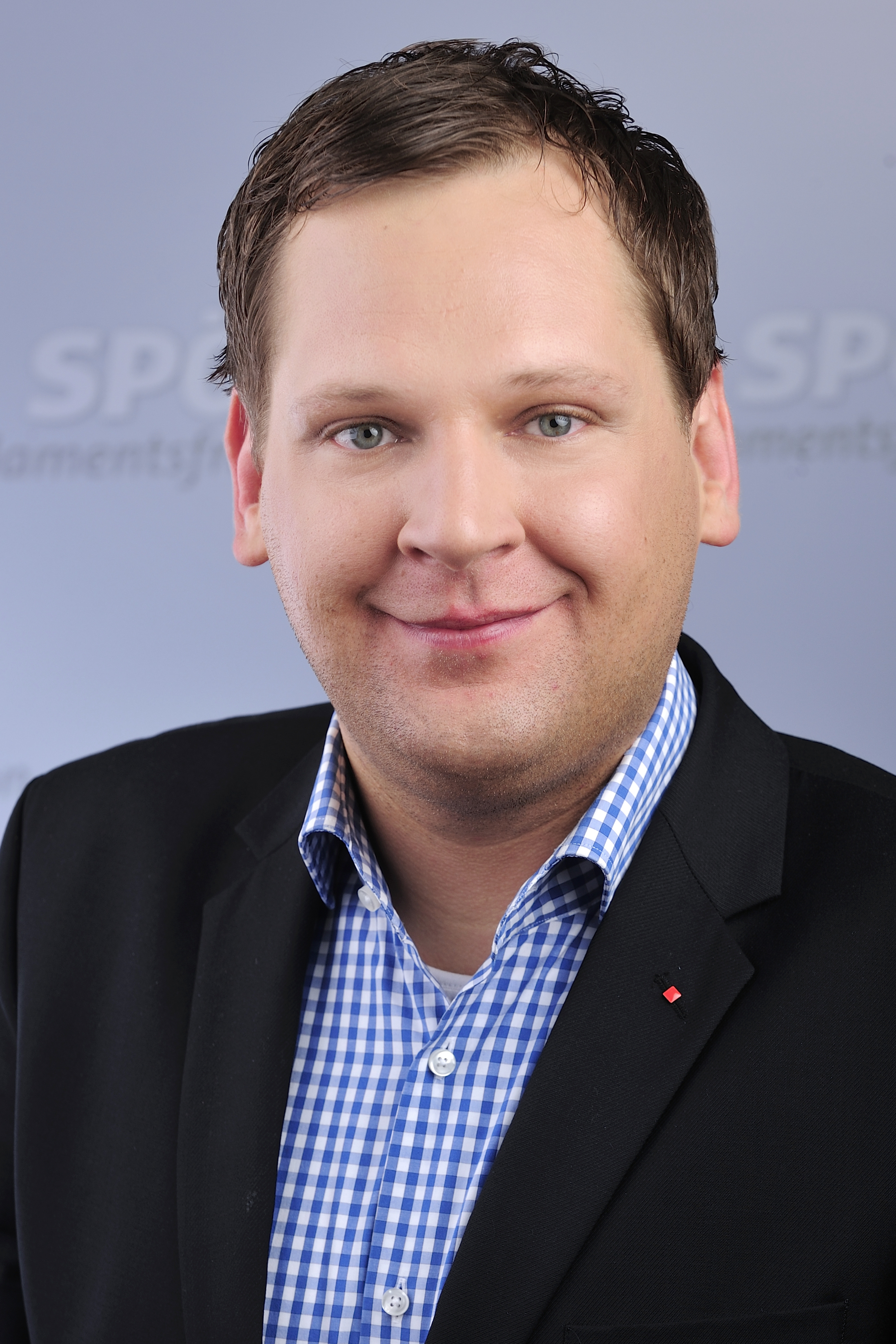
- Philip Kucher (2014)

Chair of the Socialist Students of Klagenfurt
- In office 2004–2007
- Preceded by: Stefan Otti
- Succeeded by: Verena Tischler

Vice-chair of the Austrian Students' Union
- In office 2005–2007

Personal details
- Born: 29 September 1981 (age 44)
- Party: Social Democratic Party
- Website: philipkucher.at

Philip Kucher (born September 29, 1981, in Klagenfurt am Wörthersee, Carinthia) is an Austrian politician from the Social Democratic Party of Austria (SPÖ). Kucher has been a member of the Austrian National Council since October 2013.

== Early life and political career ==
After attending primary school and high school in Klagenfurt, Philip Kucher graduated from secondary school in 2000. Subsequently, he completed his civil service at the Red Cross. He then enrolled at the University of Klagenfurt, where he studied business administration and psychology without completing his degree. Since 2011, he has been studying Political communication at the Danube University Krems.

Kucher gained his first political experience from 2004 to 2007 when he served as the chairperson of the Socialist Students of Austria (VSStÖ) in Klagenfurt. During the same period, from 2005 to 2007, Kucher also served as the vice-chairperson of the Austrian Students' Union at the University of Klagenfurt.

In June 2007, Kucher assumed the leadership of the Dr. Karl Renner Institute in Carinthia.

Since 2008, Kucher has been a member of the executive board of the SPÖ Klagenfurt. A year later, in 2009, he was elected as a representative of the SPÖ to the city council of the Carinthian state capital.

In 2013, Kucher was elected to the Austrian National Council in Vienna.

Furthermore, from November 2015 to November 2021, Kucher served as the district branch manager of the Klagenfurt district branch of the Austrian Red Cross, Carinthia Regional Association.

In 2023, amid a double change in party leadership under Andreas Babler, Kucher was designated as the acting parliamentary club chairman in the National Council.
