= Social Democratic Party of Austria =

Political party in Austria

Social Democratic Party of Austria Sozialdemokratische Partei Österreichs
- Abbreviation: SPÖ
- Chairperson: Andreas Babler; Eva-Maria Holzleitner; Philip Kucher
- Parliamentary leader: Philip Kucher
- Secretary General: Klaus Seltenheim
- Deputy chairpersons: See list: Doris Bures; Eva-Maria Holzleitner; Roland Fürst; Julia Herr; Ulrike Königsberger-Ludwig; Jörg Leichtfried; Mario Leiter; Christoph Matznetter; Michaela Schmidt; Elvira Schmidt; Martin Winkler; Philip Wohlgemuth
- Leader in the EP: Andreas Schieder
- Founder: Victor Adler
- Founded: 1 January 1889; 137 years ago
- Headquarters: Löwelstraße 18, 1010 Vienna
- Student wing: Socialist Students of Austria
- Youth wing: Junge Generation; Socialist Youth Austria
- Paramilitary wing: Republikanischer Schutzbund (1923–1934)
- Membership (2023): c. 140,000
- Ideology: Social democracy
- Political position: Centre-left
- European affiliation: Party of European Socialists
- European Parliament group: Progressive Alliance of Socialists and Democrats
- International affiliation: Progressive Alliance Socialist International (1951-2022)
- Colours: Red
- Anthem: "Lied der Arbeit" ('Song of Labour')
- National Council: 41 / 183
- Federal Council: 18 / 60
- Governorships: 3 / 9
- Landtag Seats: 128 / 440
- European Parliament: 5 / 20

Website
- spoe.at

The Social Democratic Party of Austria (German: Sozialdemokratische Partei Österreichs [soˈtsi̯aːldemoˌkraːtɪʃɛ parˌtaɪ ˈøːstɐraɪçs], SPÖ) is a social democratic political party in Austria. Founded in 1889 as the Social Democratic Workers' Party of Austria (German: Sozialdemokratische Arbeiterpartei Österreichs, SDAPÖ) and later known as the Socialist Party of Austria (German: Sozialistische Partei Österreichs) from 1945 until 1991, the party is the oldest extant political party in Austria. Along with the Austrian People's Party (ÖVP), it is one of the country's two traditional major parties. It is positioned on the centre-left on the political spectrum.

Since June 2023, the party has been led by Andreas Babler. It is currently the third largest of five parties in the National Council, having won 41 of 183 seats and 21.1% of the popular vote in the 2024 Austrian legislative election. It holds seats in the legislatures of all nine states; of these, it is the largest party in three (Burgenland, Carinthia, and Vienna.) The SPÖ is supportive of Austria's membership in the European Union, and it is a member of the Progressive Alliance and Party of European Socialists. It sits with the Progressive Alliance of Socialists and Democrats in the European Parliament; of Austria's 19 MEPs, five are members of the SPÖ. The party has close ties to the Austrian Trade Union Federation (ÖGB) and the Austrian Chamber of Labour (AK).

The SDAPÖ was the second largest party in the Imperial Council of the Austro-Hungarian Empire from the 1890s through 1910s. After the First World War, it briefly governed the First Austrian Republic, but thereafter returned to opposition. The party was banned in 1934 following the Austrian Civil War, and was suppressed throughout Austrofascism and the Nazi period. The party was refounded as the Socialist Party of Austria in 1945 and governed as a junior partner of the ÖVP until 1966. In 1970, the SPÖ became the largest party for the first time in post-war history, and Bruno Kreisky became Chancellor, winning three consecutive majorities (1971, 1975, and 1979). From 1987 to 2000 the SPÖ led a grand coalition with the ÖVP before returning to opposition for the first time in 30 years. The party governed again from 2007 to 2017. From 2017 to 2025, the SPÖ was the primary opposition to the ÖVP governments of Sebastian Kurz, Alexander Schallenberg, and Karl Nehammer. Since 2025, the SPÖ has governed as a junior partner of the ÖVP, alongside the NEOS.

== History ==
=== Monarchy and interwar period ===
Use of the three arrows in Austria has historically been linked with the SPÖ.

Since its foundation in 1889 as the SDAPÖ, the party has been one of the main political forces in Austria. At the start of the World War I, it was the strongest party in parliament. At the ending of that war in 1918, the party leader Karl Renner became Chancellor of the First Republic. The SDAPÖ lost power in 1920, but it retained a strong base of support.

After the break-up of the Austro-Hungarian Empire (1918), the Social Democratic Party supported for a time the idea of a union with Berlin in order to constitute a great democratic German republic, thus taking up a revolutionary project of 1848. The victors of the war did not see it that way and set the borders of Austria. In the interwar period, Austromarxism, maintaining its particularities in the face of German social democracy – which had bloodily suppressed the Spartacist uprising of 1919 – and Soviet communism, envisaged the creation of a new international aimed at bringing together the different currents of socialism. However, the attempt did not succeed. The more left-wing Social Democrats, such as Max Adler, relied on the Workers' councils that had developed throughout Central Europe in 1918–1919, particularly in Vienna.

The SDAPÖ was the most established of the European social democratic parties. In the 1920s, about 15 percent of Austrians were members of an association linked to the party. In 1929, it had 720,000 members. The SDAPÖ was almost hegemonic among the working class, but could not compete with the conservatives in the countryside and small towns. The economic crisis of the 1930s, which caused factory closures and increased unemployment, weakened the labor movement and with it the SDAPÖ. In 1930, its membership was down to 650,000 militants.

From 1919 to February 1934, the Social Democrats were in continuous control of the Vienna municipality, which acquired the nickname "Red Vienna". The municipality developed an ambitious policy, including a vast program of construction of workers' housing, which included 60,000 communal social housing units. In addition, free medical care was introduced, and income and luxury taxes were introduced. Culture was clearly emphasized: "Arbeiterbildung" (working-class education and culture) reigned supreme, and the city was home to many internationally renowned intellectuals and artists. Numerous cinemas and theaters subsidized by the municipality opened their doors, and sports became more democratic. This socialist experiment, supported by some renowned intellectuals such as Otto Neurath and Sigmund Freud, also inspired a violent disgust in conservative circles. The press readily described red Vienna as a "Jewish creation" in the hands of "Bolshevism".

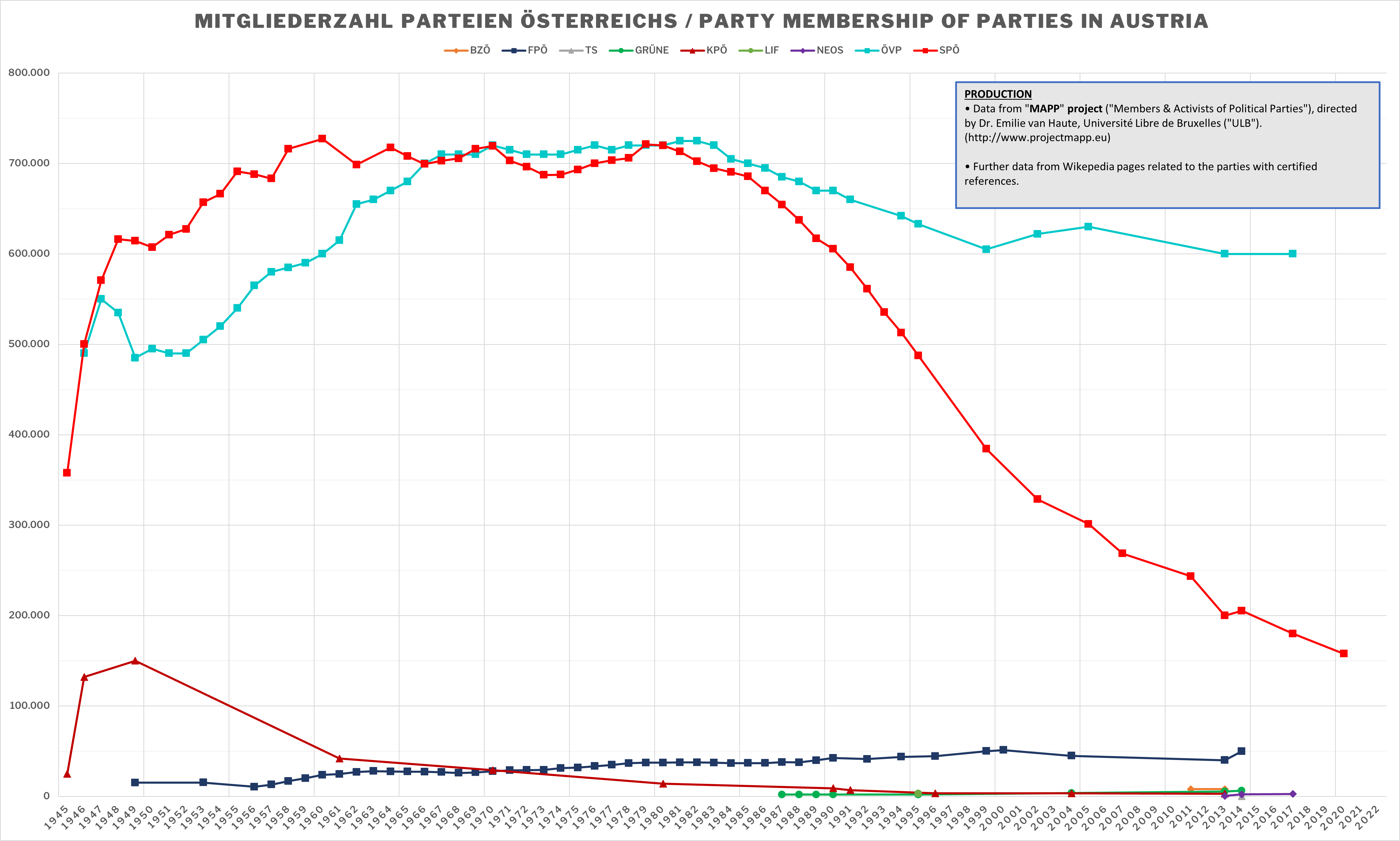
Party membership of SPÖ over time, since 1945. The peak was reached in 1970s. Membership has declined since 1986.

=== Austrofascism and the Third Reich ===
In 1934, the Christian Social Party, the dominant party on the right, overthrew the democratic system and established an authoritarian corporatist regime inspired by fascism. The social democrats and communists put up armed resistance, but it was quickly crushed.

When Anschluss took place in 1938 at the hands of Adolf Hitler's Nazi Germany, he brought Austria into the Second World War.

=== 1945 and onwards ===
In 1945, the party was reconstituted as the Socialist Party of Austria (German: Sozialistische Partei Österreichs, SPÖ) and was led by Adolf Schärf. The SPÖ entered the government of the Second Republic as part of a grand coalition with the Austrian People's Party (ÖVP) until 1966 and with the Communist Party of Austria until 1949. Renner became the first President of Austria.

Governing as part of a grand coalition, the party shifted its policy program "from Marxist radicalism to conciliatory laborism." In contrast to more radical socialist parties, the SPÖ did not call for an overall planned economy, did not call firmly for a separation of church and state, and called only for moderate agrarian reform.

From 1971 to 1983, the SPÖ under Bruno Kreisky was the sole governing party. For the following three years, it ruled in coalition with the Freedom Party of Austria (FPÖ), then up to 2000 it was again part of a grand coalition with the ÖVP, with Franz Vranitzky as Chancellor until 1997. In 1991, it reverted to including Democratic in its name, becoming the Social Democratic Party of Austria (German: Sozialdemokratische Partei Österreichs). During this period, the grand coalition combined with the Proporz system, whereby important posts throughout the government were shared out between members of the two main parties, evoked rising discontent. This was a factor in the growing popularity of the FPÖ which came second to the SPÖ in the 1999 Austrian legislative election. The following year, the FPÖ and ÖVP formed a right-wing coalition, displacing the SPÖ from a share in government. While this coalition was still in power, the SPÖ's Heinz Fischer was elected president in the 2004 Austrian presidential election. Following the 2006 Austrian legislative election, another grand coalition was formed between the SPÖ and the ÖVP, lasting until 2017, when the SPÖ went back to the opposition. In the 2019 Austrian legislative election, the SPÖ lost 12 seats and shrunk to 21.2%.

After the lost state elections in Lower Austria and Carinthia at the beginning of 2023, there was a power struggle between the moderate social democratic party wing around party leader Pamela Rendi-Wagner and the right-wing, FPÖ-friendly party wing around Burgenland governor Hans Peter Doskozil. The Social Democratic wing has support from socialists and communists. The right wing has support from the middle wing of the party. Disputes and disagreements have existed for years. In March 2023, the situation came to a head after the SPÖ Burgenland stopped paying money to the federal party. On 15 March 2023, a heated party executive meeting led to the call for a new party leadership election. The candidacy for the new leadership was heated and a surprise candidacy from Andreas Babler, mayor of Traiskirchen, which has led to some other candidates to withdraw their candidacy for the 2023 Social Democratic Party of Austria leadership election. This election ended with a win of Andreas Babler. Two days before, Hans Peter-Doskozil had been mistakenly introduced as a new party leader because of "a technical mistake in an Excel sheet"

At the 2024 Austrian legislative election the Social Democratic Party (SPÖ) won just 21.1%, marking its worst result ever in the National Council.

Amid increasing unrest within the party due to further erosion in opinion polls and a public leadership challenge from businessman Gerhard Zeiler, Babler announced a structured exit as party chairman on 4 October 2026. In January 2027, he will step down as vice chancellor and be replaced by finance minister Markus Marterbauer, and Philip Kucher and Eva-Maria Holzleitner will become interim party co-chairs. A new permanent party leader is to be selected at a special convention in the spring of 2027.

== Dealing with the past from 1938 to 1945 ==
Concerning the role of the SDAPÖ during Nazi rule from 1938 to 1945, the party started opening its archives and set in a commission to investigate its past conduct. Despite the fact the SDAPÖ had been outlawed and many party members imprisoned under Austrofascism, many SDAPÖ members initially welcomed the Anschluss of Austria into Germany back then and some became members of the Nazi Party. Alfred Gusenbauer issued a declaration promising and supporting a full and open investigation ("Klarheit in der Vergangenheit – Basis für die Zukunft"). In 2005, the report about the so-called "brown spots" (German: braune Flecken) was completed and published. The report talks about SDAPÖ members and leaders who became members of the Nazi Party during German rule after the Anschluss. One example given in the report is the case of Heinrich Gross, who received many honours from the party and even the government in the post-war period. This was despite the fact that he worked as a Nazi doctor in the euthanasia ward Am Spiegelgrund in Vienna, where human experiments on children were performed. Those children with presumptive mental defects were eventually killed, often by lethal injection. Gross was probably himself involved in the experimentations and killings. The Austrian judicial system protected him for a very long time from any kind of prosecution, something that was very typical in the post-war period. He enjoyed wide support from the SPÖ and party leaders for a very long time.

Reflecting the change in attitude towards the past, President Heinz Fischer in a 10 April 2006 interview with the liberal newspaper Der Standard strongly criticised Austria's view on its historical role during Nazi rule. He called the traditional view that Austria was the first victim of Nazi aggression as false. The Moscow Declaration of 1943 by émigrés which called for the independence of Austria from Nazi Germany was a problem since it stated that the war was neither started nor wanted by any Austrian ("Und das ist nicht richtig"), that Austrian Jewish victims were not mentioned in the declaration ("kein Wort für die jüdischen Opfer"), that it took decades for them to receive any kind of compensation and justice from the government and that it was regrettable and inexcusable. His statements were direct criticism of the right-wing government of the coalition ÖVP–FPÖ which rejected compensation to victims and the admission of the co-guilt Austrians carried for crimes committed by them during the Second World War.

== Organisation ==
=== Chairpersons since 1945 ===
The chart below shows a timeline of the social-democratic chairpersons and the Chancellors of Austria since 1945. The left bar shows all the chairpersons (Bundesparteivorsitzende, abbreviated as CP) of the SPÖ, and the right bar shows the corresponding make-up of the Austrian government at that time. The red (SPÖ) and black (ÖVP) colours correspond to which party led the federal government (Bundesregierung, abbreviated as Govern.). The last names of the respective chancellors are shown, with the Roman numeral standing for the cabinets.

=== Select list of other SPÖ politicians ===
- Josef Broukal, journalist and Member of Parliament
- Johanna Dohnal, the first minister for women's affairs during the government of Bruno Kreisky
- Christoph Matznetter, budget and financial matters spokesman in the National Council
- Barbara Prammer, first female National Council President of Austria

=== Youth factions ===
After the founding of the SDAPÖ in 1889, a youth organization was established on 4 November 1894, with the purpose of protecting apprentices and addressing the concerns of young people within the party. Despite initial resistance from some SDAPÖ members, an independent socialist youth movement emerged. Today, this organization is known as the Socialist Youth Austria (SJÖ). The SJÖ notably chose not to change its name to "social-democratic" when the SPÖ rebranded itself in 1991, highlighting its independence both programmatically – as the SJÖ remains democratic socialist rather than social-democratic like the SPÖ – and organizationally. This autonomy has often led to tensions between the SJÖ and the SPÖ, including instances where the party reduced the SJÖ's funding. To address these issues, the SPÖ established a youth organization called the Young Generation (JG) on 22 January 1958.

The creation of the JG was not only a response to the disappointing results in the 1956 national elections, particularly among young voters, but also an effort to manage the increasingly strained relationship with the SJÖ. Over time, the JG has evolved into a parallel structure, closely aligned with the SPÖ and more in line with the party's objectives than the SJÖ.

Many influential politicians have emerged from the ranks of the SJÖ, including figures like Bruno Kreisky and Andreas Babler, who have significantly shaped the party's direction. However, the SJÖ is not the only youth organization that has produced notable leaders; the JG has also been a breeding ground for politicians who have gone on to make their mark on the SPÖ.

The SJÖ also has factions within its organization, such as the Trotskyist "Der Funke" (IMT) faction, which was active in the now-dissolved SJ9 (Alsergrund district) and continues to be present in SJ Vorarlberg. As a result of these events, tensions between all parties involved continue to this day.

== Election results by states ==
=== Burgenland ===
Burgenland is a state that is a traditional stronghold of the SPÖ. Since 1964, the governors of this easternmost state have come from the SPÖ. Burgenland is one of the few states that are ruled by a SPÖ majority in the state assembly (Landtag). In 2000, the SPÖ received 46.6%. In 2005, it received 5.2% more votes and ended up with an absolute majority of 51.8%. After losing it in 2010, the SPÖ was able to regain it in the latest election in January 2020. From 2015 to 2020, the SPÖ in Burgenland was in an unusual coalition with the FPÖ. The Governor (Landeshauptmann) of the Burgenland is Hans Peter Doskozil.

=== Carinthia ===
The SPÖ used to be strong in Carinthia as it regularly won the most seats in state elections and the governors used to be Social Democrats until 1989. Since the rise of Jörg Haider and his FPÖ, he successfully pushed the SPÖ out of their leading position. In state elections in 1999, the SPÖ received 32.9%. However, this went up to 38.4% in 2004. Until 2005, the SPÖ was in a coalition with the right-wing FPÖ in Carinthia, where Haider was Governor. This constellation is in question after the chairperson of the Carinthian SPÖ Gabi Schauning decided to resign from her post as Vice-Governor of Carinthia after a fall-out with Haider. Carinthia has a mandatory concentration government, where each party with a certain number of seats in the state parliament automatically participates in the state government. The term coalition refers to the co-operation between parties and not to the participation in the state cabinet.

=== Lower Austria ===
In Lower Austria, the SPÖ received 29.2% in 1998. It increased its shares by 3.2% in 2003 and ended up with 32.4%. In the 2008 Lower Austrian state election, the SPÖ received 25.5% of the vote.

=== Salzburg ===
In 2004, the SPÖ won a surprising victory in Salzburg. It was able to increase its share of votes from 32.2% (1999) to 45.3%. For the first time, the conservative ÖVP lost its traditional dominant position. Gabi Burgstaller became the first SPÖ governess (Landeshauptfrau) in the state's history. In March 2009, the party lost 2 seats (from 17 to 15) with a 39.5% of the popular votes, going to the FPÖ (from 3 to 5) with a 13% of the votes. The ÖVP had 14 seats with a 36.5% of the votes and the Grüne 2 seat with a 7.3% . The BZÖ had no seat with a 3.7% of the votes, showing a growing of the right-wing parties. In the State elections 2013 the SPÖ lost its majority to the ÖVP. Since then, the ÖVP has providing the governor (Landeshauptmann) with Wilfried Haslauer jun. again.

=== Styria ===
Styria was traditionally ruled by the ÖVP. In 2000, the Styrian SPÖ ended up with 32.3%. In 2005, the voters shifted towards the left, something that also benefited the KPÖ, the local communist party. The SPÖ won 9.4% more and ended up with 40.7%, defeating the ÖVP which got 38.7% of the votes. Styrian SPÖ Chairman Franz Voves became the state Governor. After the State elections 2015 the SPÖ lost the governorship to the ÖVP. Since then, the ÖVP has providing the governor (Landeshauptmann) with Hermann Schützenhöfer again.

=== Tyrol ===
In Tyrol, the SPÖ receive few votes since the state is a traditional conservative stronghold. In 2018, the Tyrolean SPÖ received 17.3% of all votes. The winner of the election was the ÖVP under long-term governor Günther Platter, which received 44,3% of the total vote.

=== Upper Austria ===
In 2003, the SPÖ was able to raise its voters share in Upper Austria by 11.3% from 27% (1997) to 38.3%. It was in a grand coalition with the ÖVP in the state government as the junior partner, with four out of nine of the state government ministers coming from the SPÖ.

=== Vienna ===
Vienna was always traditionally the stronghold of the SPÖ. The current Governor-Mayor of Vienna is Michael Ludwig. In the 2020 Viennese state election the SPÖ raised its vote-share to 41,6%. The party with the largest gains was the ÖVP which doubled its vote-share and won 20,4% of the votes.

=== Vorarlberg ===
Traditionally, Vorarlberg has been a stronghold of the ÖVP. In the most recent state election (2024 Vorarlberg state election), the SPÖ received 9.06 percent of the vote, losing one seat in the state assembly and holding three seats. This represents the party’s weakest result among all nine federal states of Austria. Following the election, they are now in opposition to a coalition government by the ÖVP and FPÖ.

== Election results ==
=== Imperial Council ===
| Election | Leader | Votes | % | Seats | +/– | Government |
|---|---|---|---|---|---|---|
| 1891 | Victor Adler | 3,848 | 1.26 (#12) | 0 / 353 | New | Extra-parliamentary |
| 1897 | Victor Adler | 245,001 | 23.13 (#2) | 14 / 425 | ▲14 | Opposition |
| 1900–1901 | Victor Adler | 251,652 | 23.39 (#2) | 12 / 425 | ▼2 | Opposition |
| 1907 | Victor Adler | 513,219 | 11.11 (#2) | 50 / 516 | ▲38 | Opposition |
| 1911 | Victor Adler | 542,549 | 11.96 (#2) | 46 / 516 | ▼4 | Opposition |

=== Constituent National Assembly ===
| Election | Leader | Votes | % | Seats | +/– | Government |
|---|---|---|---|---|---|---|
| 1919 | Karl Seitz | 1,211,814 | 40.76 (#1) | 72 / 170 | ▲72 | SDAPÖ–CS majority |

=== National Council (Nationalrat) ===
| Election | Leader | Votes | % | Seats | +/– | Government |
|---|---|---|---|---|---|---|
| 1920 | Karl Seitz | 1,072,709 | 35.99 (#2) | 69 / 183 | ▼3 | Opposition |
| 1923 | Karl Seitz | 1,311,870 | 39.60 (#2) | 68 / 165 | ▼1 | Opposition |
| 1927 | Karl Seitz | 1,539,635 | 42.28 (#2) | 71 / 165 | ▲3 | Opposition |
| 1930 | Karl Seitz | 1,517,146 | 41.14 (#1) | 72 / 165 | ▲1 | Opposition |
| 1945 | Adolf Schärf | 1,434,898 | 44.60 (#2) | 76 / 165 | ▲4 | ÖVP–SPÖ–KPÖ majority |
| 1949 | Adolf Schärf | 1,623,524 | 38.71 (#2) | 67 / 165 | ▼9 | ÖVP–SPÖ majority |
| 1953 | Adolf Schärf | 1,818,517 | 42.11 (#1) | 73 / 165 | ▲6 | ÖVP–SPÖ majority |
| 1956 | Adolf Schärf | 1,873,295 | 43.05 (#2) | 74 / 165 | ▲1 | ÖVP–SPÖ majority |
| 1959 | Bruno Pittermann | 1,953,935 | 44.79 (#1) | 78 / 165 | ▲4 | ÖVP–SPÖ majority |
| 1962 | Bruno Pittermann | 1,960,685 | 44.00 (#2) | 76 / 165 | ▼2 | ÖVP–SPÖ majority |
| 1966 | Bruno Pittermann | 1,928,985 | 42.56 (#2) | 74 / 165 | ▼2 | Opposition |
| 1970 | Bruno Kreisky | 2,221,981 | 48.42 (#1) | 81 / 165 | ▲7 | SPÖ minority supported by FPÖ |
| 1971 | Bruno Kreisky | 2,280,168 | 50.04 (#1) | 93 / 183 | ▲12 | SPÖ majority |
| 1975 | Bruno Kreisky | 2,326,201 | 50.42 (#1) | 93 / 183 | 0 | SPÖ majority |
| 1979 | Bruno Kreisky | 2,413,226 | 51.03 (#1) | 95 / 183 | ▲2 | SPÖ majority |
| 1983 | Bruno Kreisky | 2,312,529 | 47.65 (#1) | 90 / 183 | ▼5 | SPÖ–FPÖ majority |
| 1986 | Franz Vranitzky | 2,092,024 | 43.12 (#1) | 80 / 183 | ▼10 | SPÖ–ÖVP majority |
| 1990 | Franz Vranitzky | 2,012,787 | 42.78 (#1) | 80 / 183 | 0 | SPÖ–ÖVP majority |
| 1994 | Franz Vranitzky | 1,617,804 | 34.92 (#1) | 65 / 183 | ▼15 | SPÖ–ÖVP majority |
| 1995 | Franz Vranitzky | 1,843,474 | 38.06 (#1) | 71 / 183 | ▲6 | SPÖ–ÖVP majority |
| 1999 | Viktor Klima | 1,532,448 | 33.15 (#1) | 65 / 183 | ▼6 | Opposition |
| 2002 | Alfred Gusenbauer | 1,792,499 | 36.51 (#2) | 69 / 183 | ▲4 | Opposition |
| 2006 | Alfred Gusenbauer | 1,663,986 | 35.34 (#1) | 68 / 183 | ▼1 | SPÖ–ÖVP majority |
| 2008 | Werner Faymann | 1,430,206 | 29.26 (#1) | 57 / 183 | ▼9 | SPÖ–ÖVP majority |
| 2013 | Werner Faymann | 1,258,605 | 26.82 (#1) | 52 / 183 | ▼5 | SPÖ–ÖVP majority |
| 2017 | Christian Kern | 1,351,918 | 26.86 (#2) | 52 / 183 | Steady | Opposition |
| 2019 | Pamela Rendi-Wagner | 1,011,868 | 21.18 (#2) | 40 / 183 | ▼12 | Opposition |
| 2024 | Andreas Babler | 1,032,234 | 21.14 (#3) | 41 / 183 | ▲1 | ÖVP–SPÖ–NEOS majority |

=== Presidency ===
| Election | Candidate | First round result | | | Second round result | | |
| Election | Candidate | Votes | % | Result | Votes | % | Result |
|---|---|---|---|---|---|---|---|
| 1951 | Theodor Körner | 1,682,881 | 39.1 | Runner-up | 2,178,631 | 52.1 | Won |
| 1957 | Adolf Schärf | 2,258,255 | 51.1 | Won | | | |
| 1963 | Adolf Schärf | 2,473,349 | 55.4 | Won | | | |
| 1965 | Franz Jonas | 2,324,436 | 50.7 | Won | | | |
| 1971 | Franz Jonas | 2,487,239 | 52.8 | Won | | | |
| 1974 | Rudolf Kirchschläger | 2,392,367 | 51.7 | Won | | | |
| 1980 | Rudolf Kirchschläger | 3,538,748 | 79.9 | Won | | | |
| 1986 | Kurt Steyrer | 2,061,104 | 43.7 | Runner-up | 2,107,023 | 46.1 | Lost |
| 1992 | Rudolf Streicher | 1,888,599 | 40.7 | Runner-up | 1,915,380 | 41.1 | Lost |
| 1998 | No candidate | | | | | | |
| 2004 | Heinz Fischer | 2,166,690 | 52.4 | Won | | | |
| 2010 | Heinz Fischer | 2,508,373 | 79.3 | Won | | | |
| 2016 | Rudolf Hundstorfer | 482,790 | 11.3 | 4th place | | | |
| 2022 | No candidate | | | | | | |

=== European Parliament ===
| Election | List leader | Votes | % | Seats | +/– | EP Group |
|---|---|---|---|---|---|---|
| 1996 | Hannes Swoboda | 1,105,910 | 29.15 (#2) | 6 / 21 | New | PES |
| 1999 | Hans-Peter Martin | 888,338 | 31.71 (#1) | 7 / 21 | ▲1 | PES |
| 2004 | Hannes Swoboda | 833,517 | 33.33 (#1) | 7 / 18 | 0 | PES |
| 2009 | Hannes Swoboda | 680,041 | 23.74 (#2) | 4 / 17 | ▼3 | S&D |
| 2014 | Eugen Freund | 680,180 | 24.09 (#2) | 5 / 18 | ▲1 | S&D |
| 2019 | Andreas Schieder | 903,151 | 23.89 (#2) | 5 / 18 | 0 | S&D |
| 2024 | Andreas Schieder | 818,287 | 23.22 (#3) | 5 / 20 | 0 | S&D |

=== State Parliaments (Landtage) ===
| State | Year | Votes | % | Seats | ± | Government |
|---|---|---|---|---|---|---|
| Burgenland | 2025 | 90,606 | 46.4 (#1) | 17 / 36 | ▼2 | SPÖ-GRÜNE |
| Carinthia | 2023 | 117,962 | 38.9 (#1) | 15 / 36 | ▼3 | SPÖ–ÖVP |
| Lower Austria | 2023 | 185,760 | 20.1 (#3) | 12 / 56 | ▼1 | Opposition |
| Salzburg | 2023 | 48,099 | 17.9 (#3) | 7 / 36 | ▼1 | Opposition |
| Styria | 2024 | 141,517 | 21.4 (#3) | 10 / 48 | ▼2 | Opposition |
| Tyrol | 2022 | 60,009 | 17.5 (#3) | 7 / 36 | ▲1 | ÖVP–SPÖ |
| Upper Austria | 2021 | 150,094 | 18.6 (#3) | 11 / 56 | 0 | Opposition |
| Vienna | 2025 | 256,541 | 39.51 (#1) | 46 / 100 | ▼ | SPÖ–NEOS |
| Vorarlberg | 2024 | 16,713 | 9.1 (#4) | 3 / 36 | ▼1 | Opposition |

=== Results timeline ===
| Year | (Austria) Pres. | (Austria) NR | (European Union) EU | (Burgenland) Bgld | (Carinthia) Ktn | (Lower Austria) NÖ | (Salzburg (state)) Sbg | (Styria) Stmk | (Tyrol (federal state)) Tyrol | (Upper Austria) OÖ | (Vienna) Wien | (Vorarlberg) Vbg |
|---|---|---|---|---|---|---|---|---|---|---|---|---|
| 1945 | Indirect | 44.6 | N/A | 44.9 | 48.8 | 40.4 | 39.5 | 41.6 | 28.0 | 38.3 | 57.2 | 27.2 |
| 1946 | Indirect | | N/A | Proporz | 48.8 | Proporz | Proporz | Proporz | Proporz | Proporz | | |
| 1947 | Indirect | | N/A | Proporz | 48.8 | Proporz | Proporz | Proporz | Proporz | Proporz | | |
| 1948 | Indirect | | N/A | Proporz | 48.8 | Proporz | Proporz | Proporz | Proporz | Proporz | | |
| 1949 | Indirect | ▼38.7 | N/A | ▼40.4 | ▼40.8 | ▼37.4 | ▼33.6 | ▼37.4 | ▼24.0 | ▼30.8 | ▼49.9 | ▼19.1 |
| 1950 | Indirect | | N/A | Proporz | ▼40.8 | Proporz | Proporz | Proporz | Proporz | Proporz | | |
| 1951 | 39.1 (R1); **52.1 (R2)** | | N/A | Proporz | ▼40.8 | Proporz | Proporz | Proporz | Proporz | Proporz | | |
| 1952 | W | | N/A | Proporz | ▼40.8 | Proporz | Proporz | Proporz | Proporz | Proporz | | |
| 1953 | W | ▲42.1 | N/A | ▲44.7 | ▲48.2 | Proporz | Proporz | ▲41.1 | ▲27.4 | Proporz | | |
| 1954 | W | | N/A | Proporz | ▲48.2 | ▲41.0 | ▲38.2 | Proporz | Proporz | Proporz | ▲52.7 | ▲26.0 |
| 1955 | W | | N/A | Proporz | ▲48.2 | Proporz | Proporz | Proporz | Proporz | ▲39.4 | | |
| 1956 | W | ▲43.0 | N/A | ▲46.0 | ▼48.1 | Proporz | Proporz | Proporz | Proporz | Proporz | | |
| 1957 | ▲51.1 (R1) | | N/A | Proporz | ▼48.1 | Proporz | Proporz | ▲43.6 | ▲31.0 | Proporz | | |
| 1958 | | | N/A | Proporz | ▼48.1 | Proporz | Proporz | Proporz | Proporz | Proporz | | |
| 1959 | | ▲44.8 | N/A | Proporz | ▼48.1 | ▲42.3 | ▲38.6 | Proporz | Proporz | Proporz | ▲54.4 | ▲29.3 |
| 1960 | | | N/A | ▲46.2 | ▲48.5 | Proporz | Proporz | Proporz | Proporz | Proporz | | |
| 1961 | | | N/A | Proporz | ▲48.5 | Proporz | Proporz | ▼41.7 | ▼30.1 | ▲39.6 | | |
| 1962 | | ▼44.0 | N/A | Proporz | ▲48.5 | Proporz | Proporz | Proporz | Proporz | Proporz | | |
| 1963 | ▲55.4 (R1) | | N/A | Proporz | ▲48.5 | Proporz | Proporz | Proporz | Proporz | Proporz | | |
| 1964 | | | N/A | ▲48.2 | ▲48.5 | ▲42.8 | ▲40.9 | Proporz | Proporz | Proporz | ▲54.7 | ▲**29.5** |
| 1965 | ▼50.7 (R1) | | N/A | ▲48.2 | ▲49.2 | Proporz | Proporz | ▲42.2 | ▲30.5 | Proporz | | |
| 1966 | | ▼42.6 | N/A | ▲48.2 | ▲49.2 | Proporz | Proporz | Proporz | Proporz | Proporz | | |
| 1967 | | ▼42.6 | N/A | ▲48.2 | ▲49.2 | Proporz | Proporz | Proporz | Proporz | ▲**46.0** | | |
| 1968 | | ▼42.6 | N/A | ▲50.3 | ▲49.2 | Proporz | Proporz | Proporz | Proporz | Proporz | | |
| 1969 | | ▼42.6 | N/A | ▲50.3 | ▲49.2 | ▲44.6 | ▼40.4 | Proporz | Proporz | Proporz | ▲56.9 | ▼27.7 |
| 1970 | | ▲48.4 | N/A | ▲50.3 | ▲53.1 | Proporz | Proporz | ▲**44.7** | ▲**33.5** | Proporz | | |
| 1971 | ▲52.8 (R1) | ▲50.0 | N/A | ▲50.3 | ▲53.1 | Proporz | Proporz | Proporz | Proporz | Proporz | | |
| 1972 | | | N/A | ▲50.5 | ▲53.1 | Proporz | Proporz | Proporz | Proporz | Proporz | | |
| 1973 | | | N/A | ▲50.5 | ▲53.1 | Proporz | Proporz | Proporz | Proporz | ▼43.4 | ▲**60.1** | |
| 1974 | ▼51.7 (R1) | | N/A | ▲50.5 | ▲53.1 | ▼43.9 | ▼36.2 | ▼41.2 | Proporz | Proporz | | ▼27.6 |
| 1975 | | ▲50.4 | N/A | ▲50.5 | ▼51.4 | Proporz | Proporz | Proporz | ▼32.4 | Proporz | | ▼27.6 |
| 1976 | | | N/A | ▲50.5 | ▼51.4 | Proporz | Proporz | Proporz | Proporz | Proporz | | ▼27.6 |
| 1977 | | | N/A | ▲52.0 | ▼51.4 | Proporz | Proporz | Proporz | Proporz | Proporz | | ▼27.6 |
| 1978 | | | N/A | ▲52.0 | ▼51.4 | Proporz | Proporz | ▼40.3 | Proporz | Proporz | ▼57.2 | ▼27.6 |
| 1979 | | ▲**51.0** | N/A | ▲52.0 | ▲**54.0** | ▲**45.4** | ▲39.1 | Proporz | ▼29.3 | ▼41.4 | | ▲29.0 |
| 1980 | ▲**79.9 (R1)** | | N/A | ▲52.0 | ▲**54.0** | Proporz | Proporz | Proporz | Proporz | Proporz | | ▲29.0 |
| 1981 | | | N/A | ▲52.0 | ▲**54.0** | Proporz | Proporz | ▲42.7 | Proporz | Proporz | | ▲29.0 |
| 1982 | | | N/A | ▲**53.2** | ▲**54.0** | Proporz | Proporz | Proporz | Proporz | Proporz | | ▲29.0 |
| 1983 | | ▼47.7 | N/A | ▲**53.2** | ▲**54.0** | ▼41.4 | Proporz | Proporz | Proporz | Proporz | ▼55.5 | ▲29.0 |
| 1984 | | | N/A | ▲**53.2** | ▼51.7 | Proporz | ▼35.1 | Proporz | ▼25.2 | Proporz | | ▼24.0 |
| 1985 | | | N/A | ▲**53.2** | ▼51.7 | Proporz | Proporz | Proporz | Proporz | ▼38.0 | | ▼24.0 |
| 1986 | ▼43.7 (R1) ▼46.1 (R2) | ▼43.1 | N/A | ▲**53.2** | ▼51.7 | Proporz | Proporz | ▼37.6 | Proporz | Proporz | | ▼24.0 |
| 1987 | W | | N/A | ▼47.3 | ▼51.7 | Proporz | Proporz | Proporz | Proporz | Proporz | ▼54.9 | ▼24.0 |
| 1988 | W | | N/A | ▼47.3 | ▼51.7 | ▼37.3 | Proporz | Proporz | Proporz | Proporz | | ▼24.0 |
| 1989 | W | | N/A | ▼47.3 | ▼46.0 | Proporz | ▼31.3 | Proporz | ▼22.8 | Proporz | | ▼21.3 |
| 1990 | W | ▼42.8 | N/A | ▼47.3 | Proporz | Proporz | Proporz | Proporz | Proporz | Proporz | | ▼21.3 |
| 1991 | W | | N/A | ▲48.1 | Proporz | Proporz | Proporz | ▼34.9 | Proporz | ▼31.4 | ▼47.8 | ▼21.3 |
| 1992 | ▼40.7 (R1) ▼43.1 (R2) | | N/A | ▲48.1 | Proporz | Proporz | Proporz | Proporz | Proporz | Proporz | | ▼21.3 |
| 1993 | W | | N/A | ▲48.1 | Proporz | ▼33.9 | Proporz | Proporz | Proporz | Proporz | | ▼21.3 |
| 1994 | W | ▼34.9 | N/A | ▲48.1 | ▼37.4 | Proporz | ▼27.1 | Proporz | ▼19.8 | Proporz | | ▼16.2 |
| 1995 | W | ▲38.1 | N/A | ▲48.1 | Proporz | Proporz | Proporz | ▲35.9 | Proporz | Proporz | | ▼16.2 |
| 1996 | W | | 29.2 | ▼44.5 | Proporz | Proporz | Proporz | Proporz | Proporz | Proporz | ▼39.2 | ▼16.2 |
| 1997 | W | | 29.2 | ▼44.5 | Proporz | Proporz | Proporz | Proporz | Proporz | ▼27.0 | | ▼16.2 |
| 1998 | Did not stand | | 29.2 | ▼44.5 | Proporz | ▼30.4 | Proporz | Proporz | Proporz | | | ▼16.2 |
| 1999 | Did not stand | ▼33.2 | ▲31.7 | ▼44.5 | ▼32.9 | Proporz | ▲32.3 | Proporz | ▲21.8 | | | ▼13.0 |
| 2000 | Did not stand | ▼33.2 | ▲31.7 | ▲46.6 | Proporz | Proporz | | ▼32.3 | | | | ▼13.0 |
| 2001 | Did not stand | ▼33.2 | ▲31.7 | ▲46.6 | Proporz | Proporz | | Proporz | | | ▲46.9 | ▼13.0 |
| 2002 | Did not stand | ▲36.5 | ▲31.7 | ▲46.6 | Proporz | Proporz | | Proporz | | | | ▼13.0 |
| 2003 | Did not stand | ▲36.5 | ▲31.7 | ▲46.6 | Proporz | ▲33.6 | | Proporz | ▲25.9 | ▲38.3 | | ▼13.0 |
| 2004 | ▲52.4 (R1) | ▲36.5 | ▲**33.3** | ▲46.6 | ▲38.4 | Proporz | ▲**45.4** | Proporz | | Proporz | | ▲16.9 |
| 2005 | | ▲36.5 | ▲**33.3** | ▲52.2 | Proporz | Proporz | | ▲41.7 | | Proporz | ▲49.1 | ▲16.9 |
| 2006 | | ▼35.3 | ▲**33.3** | ▲52.2 | Proporz | Proporz | | ▲41.7 | | Proporz | | ▲16.9 |
| 2007 | | | ▲**33.3** | ▲52.2 | Proporz | Proporz | | ▲41.7 | | Proporz | | ▲16.9 |
| 2008 | | ▼29.3 | ▲**33.3** | ▲52.2 | Proporz | ▼25.5 | | ▲41.7 | ▼15.5 | Proporz | | ▲16.9 |
| 2009 | | | ▼23.7 | ▲52.2 | ▼28.7 | Proporz | ▼39.4 | ▲41.7 | | ▼24.9 | | ▼10.0 |
| 2010 | ▲79.3 (R1) | | ▼23.7 | ▼48.3 | Proporz | Proporz | | ▼38.3 | | Proporz | ▼44.3 | ▼10.0 |
| 2011 | | | ▼23.7 | | Proporz | Proporz | | ▼38.3 | | Proporz | | ▼10.0 |
| 2012 | | | ▼23.7 | | Proporz | Proporz | | ▼38.3 | | Proporz | | ▼10.0 |
| 2013 | | ▼26.8 | ▼23.7 | | ▲37.1 | ▼21.6 | ▼23.8 | ▼38.3 | ▼13.7 | Proporz | | ▼10.0 |
| 2014 | | | ▲24.1 | | ▲37.1 | Proporz | ▼23.8 | ▼38.3 | ▼13.7 | Proporz | | ▼8.8 |
| 2015 | | | ▲24.1 | ▼41.9 | ▲37.1 | Proporz | ▼23.8 | ▼29.3 | ▼13.7 | ▼18.4 | ▼39.6 | ▼8.8 |
| 2016 | ▼11.3 (R1) | | ▲24.1 | | ▲37.1 | Proporz | ▼23.8 | | ▼13.7 | Proporz | | ▼8.8 |
| 2017 | W | ▲26.9 | ▲24.1 | | ▲37.1 | Proporz | ▼23.8 | | ▼13.7 | Proporz | | ▼8.8 |
| 2018 | W | ▲26.9 | ▲24.1 | | ▲47.9 | ▲23.9 | ▼20.0 | | ▲17.3 | Proporz | | ▼8.8 |
| 2019 | W | ▼21.2 | ▼23.9 | | | Proporz | ▼20.0 | ▼23.0 | ▲17.3 | Proporz | | ▲9.5 |
| 2020 | W | ▼21.2 | ▼23.9 | ▲49.9 | | Proporz | ▼20.0 | | ▲17.3 | Proporz | ▲41.6 | ▲9.5 |
| 2021 | W | ▼21.2 | ▼23.9 | | | Proporz | ▼20.0 | | ▲17.3 | ▲18.6 | | ▲9.5 |
| 2022 | Did not stand | ▼21.2 | ▼23.9 | | | Proporz | ▼20.0 | | ▲17.5 | Proporz | | ▲9.5 |
| 2023 | Did not stand | ▼21.2 | ▼23.9 | | ▼38.9 | ▼20.7 | ▼17.9 | | | Proporz | | ▲9.5 |
| 2024 | Did not stand | ▼21.1 | ▼23.2 | | | Proporz | ▼17.9 | ▼21.4 | | Proporz | | ▼9.1 |
| 2025 | Did not stand | | ▼23.2 | ▼46.4 | | Proporz | ▼17.9 | ▼21.4 | | Proporz | ▼39.4 | ▼9.1 |
| Year | (Austria) Pres. | (Austria) NR | (European Union) EU | (Burgenland) Bgld | (Carinthia) Ktn | (Lower Austria) NÖ | (Salzburg (state)) Sbg | (Styria) Stmk | (Tyrol (federal state)) Tyrol | (Upper Austria) OÖ | (Vienna) Wien | (Vorarlberg) Vbg |
**Bold** indicates best result to date. Present in legislature (in opposition) / Present in presidential first round Junior coalition partner / Present in presidential second round Senior coalition partner / Presidential winner

== See also ==
- Austro-Marxism
- Proletář
- Socialist Students of Austria

== Literature ==
- Gordon Brook-Shepherd. The Austrians. HarperCollins Publishers Ltd. London, 1995. ISBN 3-552-04876-6.
- Caspar Einem, Wolfgang Neugebauer, Andreas Schwarz. Der Wille zum aufrechten Gang. Czernin Verlag, Vienna, 2005. ISBN 3-7076-0196-X (discussion on book is available online on hagalil.com).
- Maria Mesner (Ed.). Entnazifizierung zwischen politischem Anspruch, Parteienkonkurrenz und Kaltem Krieg: Das Beispiel der SPÖ. Oldenbourg Verlag, Vienna, 2005. ISBN 3-486-57815-4.
- Bruno Kreisky, Matthew Paul Berg (Translator), Jill Lewis (Ed.).The Struggle for a Democratic Austria: Bruno Kreisky on Peace and Social Justice. Berghahn Books, New York, 2000. ISBN 1-57181-155-9.
- Barbara Kaindl-Widhalm. Demokraten wider Willen? Autoritäre Tendenzen und Antisemitismus in der 2. Republik. Verlag für Gesellschaftskritik, Vienna, 1990.
- Norbert Leser: Zwischen Reformismus und Bolschewismus. Der Austromarxismus in Theorie und Praxis, 1968.
- Wolfgang Neugebauer. Widerstand und Opposition, in: NS-Herrschaft in Österreich. öbv und hpt, Vienna, 2000. ISBN 3-209-03179-7.
- Peter Pelinka. Eine kurze Geschichte der SPÖ. Ereignisse, Persönlichkeiten, Jahreszahlen. Ueberreuter, Vienna, 2005. ISBN 3-8000-7113-4.
