= Attnang-Puchheim =

Attnang-Puchheim Attnang-Buachham
- Municipality
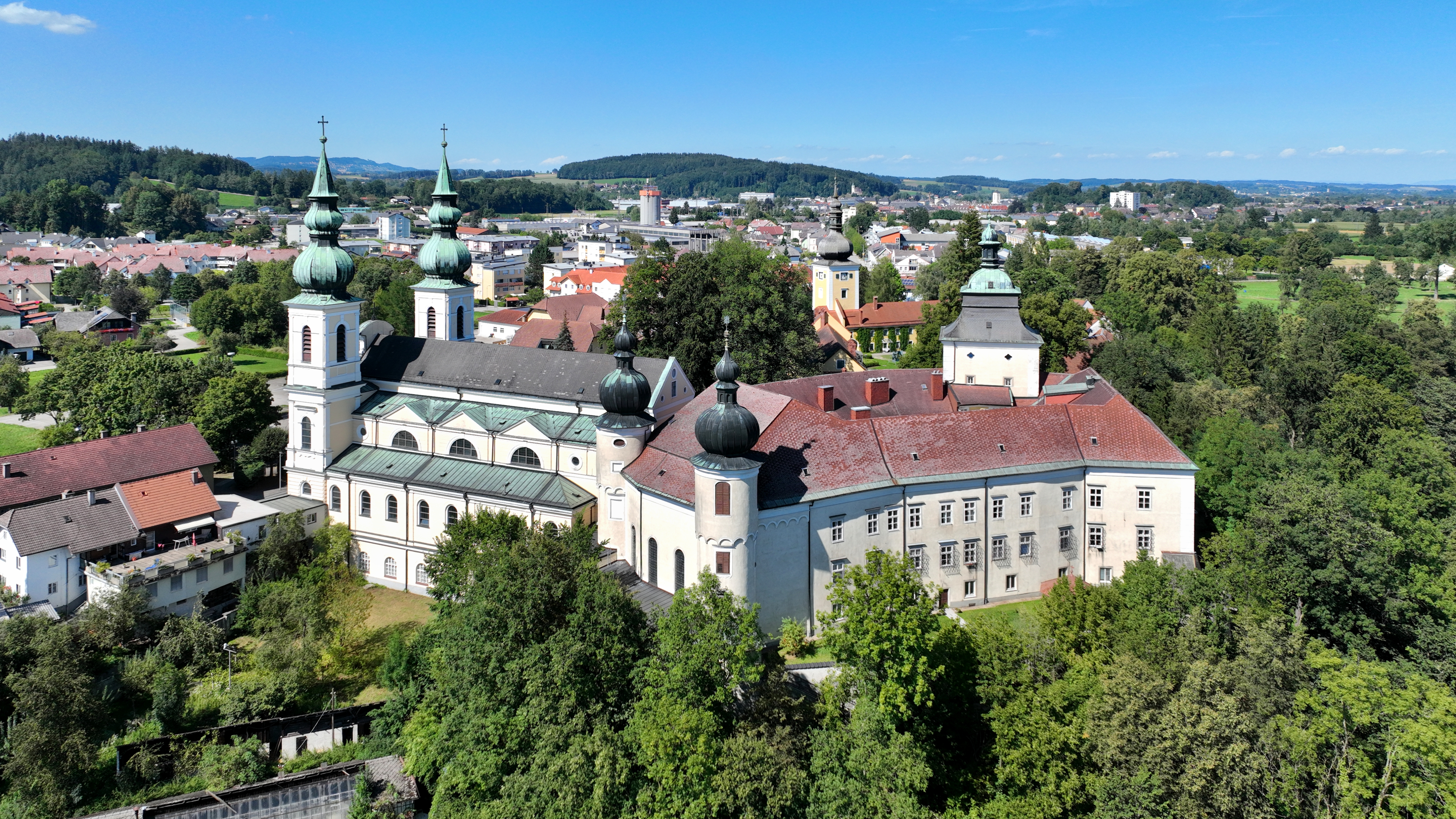
- Puchheim palace with basilica

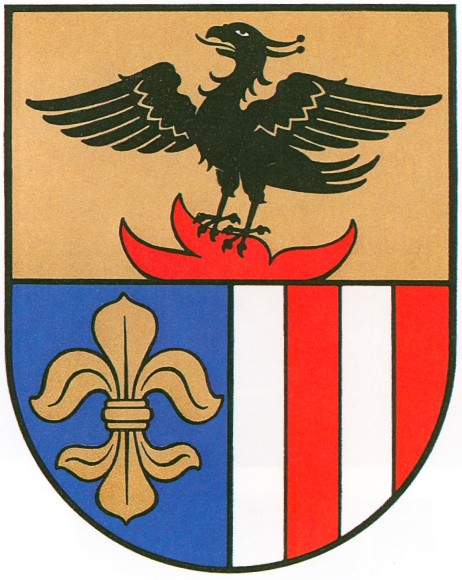
- Coat of arms

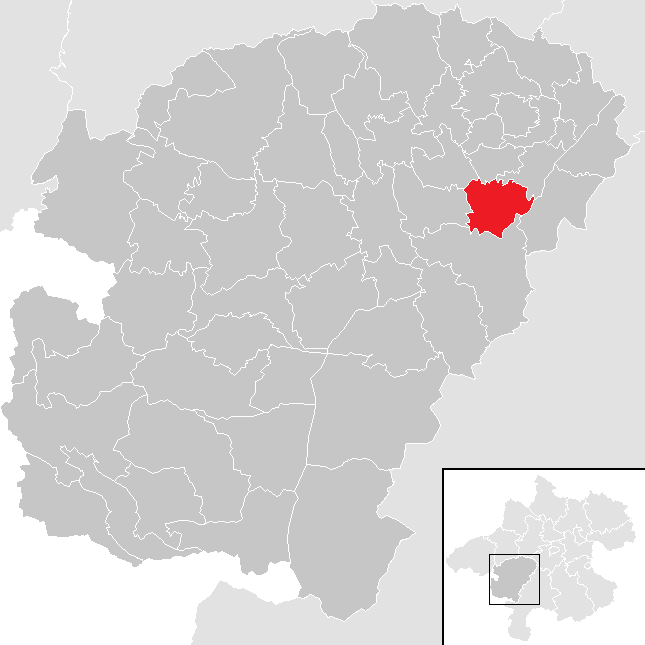
- Location in the district

- Location within Austria
- Coordinates: 48°01′00″N 13°43′11″E
- Country: Austria
- State: Upper Austria
- District: Vöcklabruck

Government
  - Mayor: Peter Groiß (SPÖ)

Area
  - Total: 12.32 km^{2} (4.76 sq mi)
- Elevation: 416 m (1,365 ft)

Population (2018-01-01)
  - Total: 8,944
  - Density: 726.0/km^{2} (1,880/sq mi)
- Time zone: UTC+1 (CET)
  - Summer (DST): UTC+2 (CEST)
- Postal code: 4800
- Area code: 07674
- Vehicle registration: VB
- Website: www.attnang-puchheim.at

Attnang-Puchheim is a town in Austria, located in the Vöcklabruck district, lying between the cities Vöcklabruck and Schwanenstadt. Its partner city is the city of Puchheim in Bavaria, Germany.

== Geography ==
Attnang-Puchheim lies within the Hausruckviertel, a traditional quarter of Upper Austria in the northern Austrian Prealps. Attnang-Puchheim is also called as "Door to Salzkammergut".

== History ==
Attnang was founded by Bavarian settlers in the late 8th century. The town of Puchheim is documented the first time in 1135, Attnang about one hundred years later in 1242. In 1912 the community changed its name from Puchheim to Attnang-Puchheim to acknowledge this growing part of the town.

In World War II, the Attnang-Puchheim marshalling yard was bombed on 21 April 1945, between 1157~1340 hrs. by 179 bombers of the US 15th Air Force from Foggia, Italy. The marshalling yard was target as an alternative due to heavy weather over the primaries of Brennero marshalling yard and Campodazzo marshalling yard.

External images
- Attnang-Pucheim bombing damage List identifying Attnang-Puchheim subcamp

Excellent concentration across entire yard, target area completely devastated, all stock and tracks within a belt 600-feet wide stretching from the center of the yard destroyed, railroad station gutted, locomotive depot and railway workshops leveled, turntable struck / wrecked, 41 x locomotives, 3 x passenger trains and coaches, 500 x rail cars damaged / destroyed, several tremendous explosions reported, nothing remains in the goods siding area, strikes destroyed/damaged 120 apartments and 277 houses, 99th BG missed the MPI with strikes landed on adjacent residential areas. The Allies captured Attnang-Puttheim on 5 May 1945.

== Population ==
Historical population
Year	Pop.	±%
1869	1,046	—
1880	1,251	+19.6%
1890	1,546	+23.6%
1900	2,333	+50.9%
1910	3,787	+62.3%
1923	4,608	+21.7%
1934	5,222	+13.3%
1939	5,413	+3.7%
1951	6,828	+26.1%
1961	7,525	+10.2%
1971	7,940	+5.5%
1981	8,044	+1.3%
1991	8,139	+1.2%
2001	8,757	+7.6%
2011	8,908	+1.7%

== Transport ==
Attnang-Puchheim railway station is a railway junction, where the Salzkammergut line connects with the Salzburg - Vienna line. It is an important station for travellers who wish to access the Salzkammergut from the rest of Austria and Europe, serving both rail and bus passengers. It has some importance for freight traffic and locomotive servicing, though not as much as in former days, when it was a major division point.

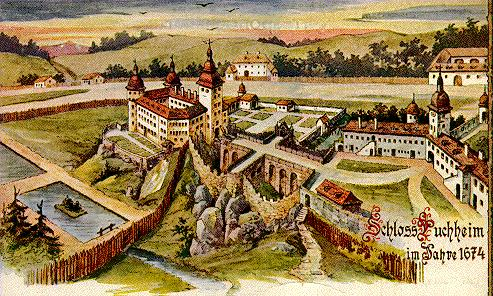
Historic view of the Stronghold Puchheim in the year 1674

== Politics ==
The current mayor (Bürgermeister) is Peter Groiß of the SPÖ (Social Democratic Party of Austria).

== Industry ==
The largest enterprises are STIWA and Spitz, giving work to more than 1.500 people in the area.

== People ==
The following were born or grew up in Attnang:

- Franz Koch (1888–1969), Germanist
- Friedrich Peter (1921–2005), Head of the Austrian Freedom Party from 1958 to 1978 (FPÖ)
- Maria Fekter (born 1 February 1956), Politician (ÖVP)
- Josef Dollinger, journalist and foreign correspondent
- Martin Schermaier, professor of law

== Sports ==
Attnang-Puchheim is home to the Attnang Athletic's baseball team. Their ballpark A's Garden further serves as training centre for the Austrian Baseball Association.
