= European Greens election results =

This article lists the election results of the European Greens (and its predecessors) in the national parliamentary, European parliamentary, local council, and regional elections.

== European Parliament ==
Year	MEPs	MEPs %	Votes %	Status
1979	0	0	2.4%	extra-parliamentary
1984	11	2.5%	4.2%	opposition
1989	25	4.8%	7.4%	opposition
1994	21	3.7%	7.4%	opposition
1999	38	6.1%	7.7%	opposition
2004	35	4.8%	7.3%	opposition
2009	48 (Note: includes 6 independent MEPs elected for the Europe Écologie group)	6.2%	7.3%	opposition
2014	50 (Note: Includes 14 MEPs, from 8 countries, NOT affiliated with EGP member parties.)	6.7%	7.3%	opposition
2019	67	11.4%	10.0%	constructive opposition

Popular vote %
Seats

== National Parliaments ==
=== Austria ===
Election	Votes	%	Seats	+/–	Government
1983	159,616	3.4 (#4)	0 / 183	0	Extra-parliamentary
1986	234,028	4.8 (#4)	8 / 183	▲8	Opposition
1990	225,084	4.8 (#4)	10 / 183	▲2	Opposition
1994	338,538	7.3 (#4)	13 / 183	▲3	Opposition
1995	233,208	4.8 (#5)	9 / 183	▼4	Opposition
1999	342,260	7.4 (#4)	14 / 183	▲5	Opposition
2002	464,980	9.5 (#4)	17 / 183	▲3	Opposition
2006	520,130	11.1 (#3)	21 / 183	▲4	Opposition
2008	509,936	10.4 (#5)	20 / 183	▼1	Opposition
2013	582,657	12.4 (#4)	24 / 183	▲4	Opposition
2017	192,638	3.8 (#6)	0 / 183	▼24	Extra-parliamentary
2019	664,055	13.9 (#4)	26 / 183	▲26	ÖVP–GRÜNE

=== Bulgaria ===
Parliament of Bulgaria
Election	Votes	%	# of seats won	Government	Notes
2009	21,841	0.52%	0 / 240	Extra-parliamentary	
2013	26,520	0.75%	0 / 240	Extra-parliamentary	
2014	19,990	0.61%	0 / 240	Extra-parliamentary	
2017	101,217	2.96%	0 / 240	Extra-parliamentary	
Apr 2021	302,280	9.31%	4 / 240 of 27 / 240	Snap election	
Jul 2021	345,331	12,48%	4 / 240 of 34 / 240	Snap election	
Nov.2021	166,968	6,28%	2 / 240 of 16 / 240	Coalition	

=== Czechia ===
Year	Vote	%	Seats	Government
1990	295,844	4.1	0 / 200	No seats
1992	421,988	6.52	3 / 200	Opposition
1996				
1998	67,143	1.12	0 / 200	No seats
2002	112,929	2.36	0 / 200	No seats
2006	336,487	6.29	6 / 200	Coalition
2010	127,831	2.44	0 / 200	No seats
2013	159,025	3.19	0 / 200	No seats
2017	74,335	1.46	0 / 200	No seats
2021	53,334	0.99	0 / 200	No seats

=== Denmark ===
Year	Votes	%	Seats	+/-	Government
1960	149,440	6.1 (#4)	11 / 179	N/A	Opposition
1964	151,697	5.8 (#4)	10 / 179	▼1	Opposition
1966	304,437	10.9 (#4)	20 / 179	▲10	External support (1966–1967)
1966	304,437	10.9 (#4)	20 / 179	▲10	Opposition (1967–1968)
1968	174,553	6.1 (#5)	11 / 179	▼9	Opposition
1971	262,756	9.1 (#5)	17 / 179	▲6	External support
1973	183,522	6.0 (#7)	11 / 179	▼6	Opposition
1975	150,963	5.0 (#7)	9 / 179	▼2	External support
1977	120,357	3.9 (#6)	7 / 179	▼2	Opposition
1979	187,284	5.9 (#5)	11 / 179	▲4	External support
1981	353,373	11.3 (#3)	21 / 179	▲10	Opposition
1984	387,122	11.5 (#4)	21 / 179	0	Opposition
1987	490,176	14.6 (#3)	27 / 179	▲6	Opposition
1988	433,261	13.0 (#3)	24 / 179	▼3	Opposition
1990	268,759	8.3 (#4)	15 / 179	▼9	Opposition
1994	242,398	7.3 (#4)	13 / 179	▼2	External support
1998	257,406	7.6 (#4)	13 / 179	0	External support
2001	219,842	6.4 (#5)	12 / 179	▼1	Opposition
2005	201,047	6.0 (#6)	11 / 179	▼1	Opposition
2007	450,975	13.0 (#4)	23 / 179	▲12	Opposition
2011	326,082	9.2 (#5)	16 / 179	▼7	Coalition (2011–2014)
2011	326,082	9.2 (#5)	16 / 179	▼7	External support (2014–2015)
2015	148,027	4.2 (#8)	7 / 179	▼9	Opposition
2019	272,093	7.7 (#5)	14 / 179	▲7	External support
Source: Folketingets Oplysning
