= 1979 Austrian legislative election =

← 1975	6 May 1979	1983 →

All 183 seats in the National Council 92 seats needed for a majority
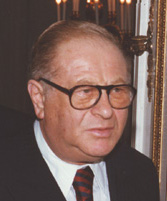

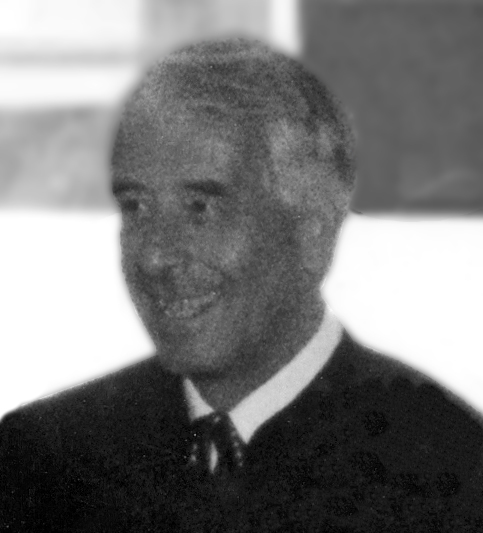
	First party	Second party	Third party
Leader	Bruno Kreisky	Josef Taus	Alexander Götz
Party	SPÖ	ÖVP	FPÖ
Last election	50.42%, 93 seats	42.95%, 80 seats,	5.41%, 10 seats,
Seats won	95	77	11
Seat change	▲2	▼3	▲1
Popular vote	2,413,226	1,981,739	286,789
Percentage	51.03%	41.90%	6.06%
Swing	▲0.61 pp	▼1.05 pp	▲0.65 pp
- Results by state
Chancellor before election
Bruno Kreisky
SPÖ
Elected Chancellor
Bruno Kreisky
SPÖ

Parliamentary elections were held in Austria on 6 May 1979. The Socialist Party won a fourth consecutive term in government, and its third as a majority government, winning 95 of 183 seats. Voter turnout was 92.2%. As of the 2024 election, the Socialist Party's result is the most seats that an Austrian party has won in a free election, as well as the last time that an Austrian political party has won an outright majority at the federal level.

== Results ==
Party	Votes	%	Seats	+/–
Social Democratic Party of Austria	2,413,226	51.03	95	+2
Austrian People's Party	1,981,739	41.90	77	–3
Freedom Party of Austria	286,743	6.06	11	+1
Communist Party of Austria	45,280	0.96	0	0
Christian Social Labour Group	2,263	0.05	0	New
Total	4,729,251	100.00	183	0
Valid votes	4,729,251	98.85		
Invalid/blank votes	54,922	1.15		
Total votes	4,784,173	100.00		
Registered voters/turnout	5,186,735	92.24		
Source: Nohlen & Stöver

=== Results by state ===
State	SPÖ	ÖVP	FPÖ	KPÖ	CSA
Burgenland	52.9	43.9	2.7	0.4	-
Carinthia	56.2	32.6	10.0	1.1	-
Lower Austria	48.4	47.3	3.6	0.7	-
Upper Austria	50.3	41.8	7.2	0.7	-
Salzburg	44.9	43.0	11.4	0.6	-
Styria	51.4	41.4	6.1	1.1	-
Tyrol	37.7	55.4	5.7	0.6	0.7
Vorarlberg	33.4	54.9	10.7	0.9	-
Vienna	60.6	33.2	4.7	1.5	-
Austria	51.0	41.9	6.1	1.0	0.1
Source: Institute for Social Research and Consulting (SORA)
