= 1956 Austrian legislative election =

← 1953	13 May 1956	1959 →

165 seats in the National Council of Austria 83 seats needed for a majority
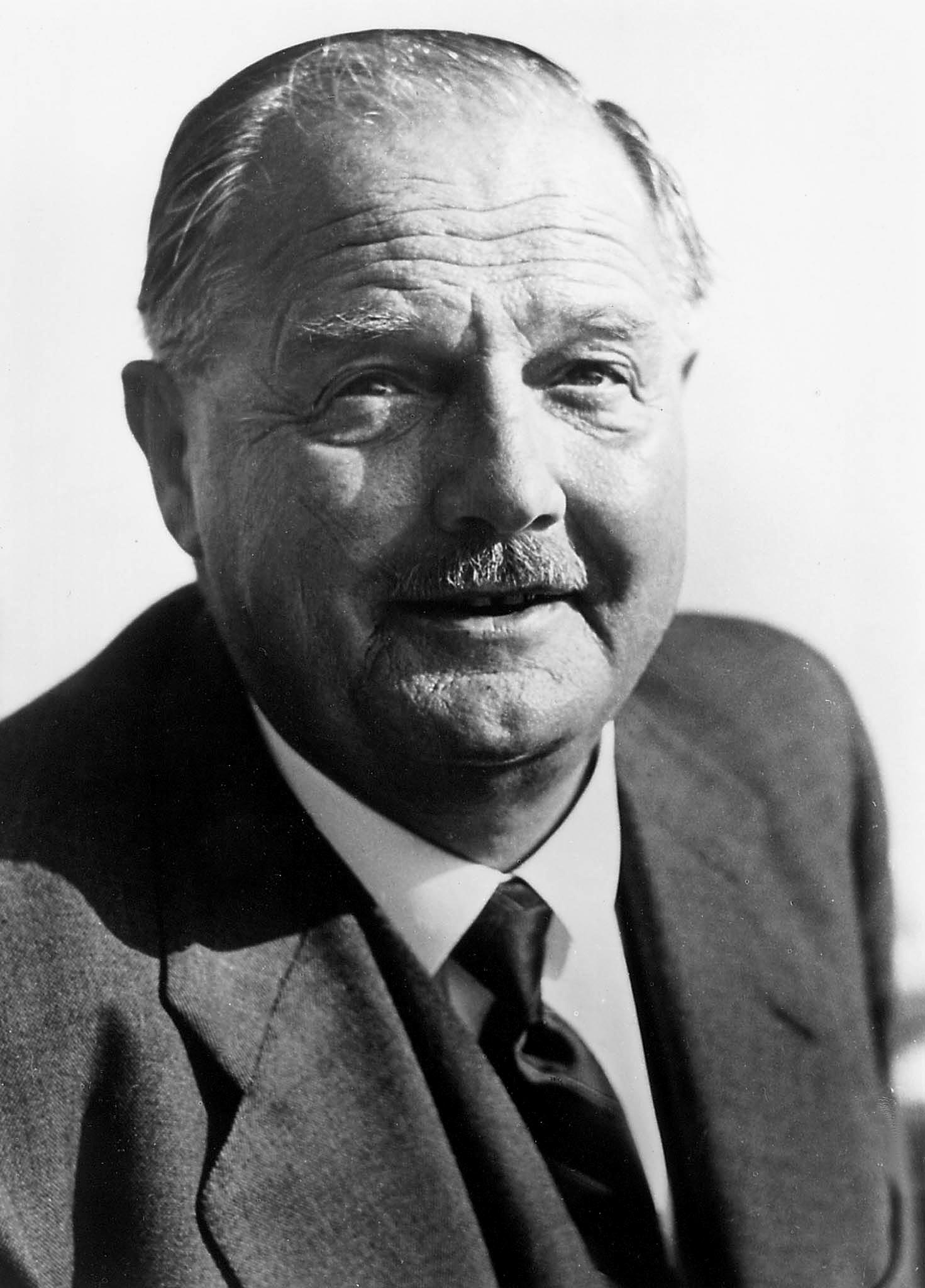

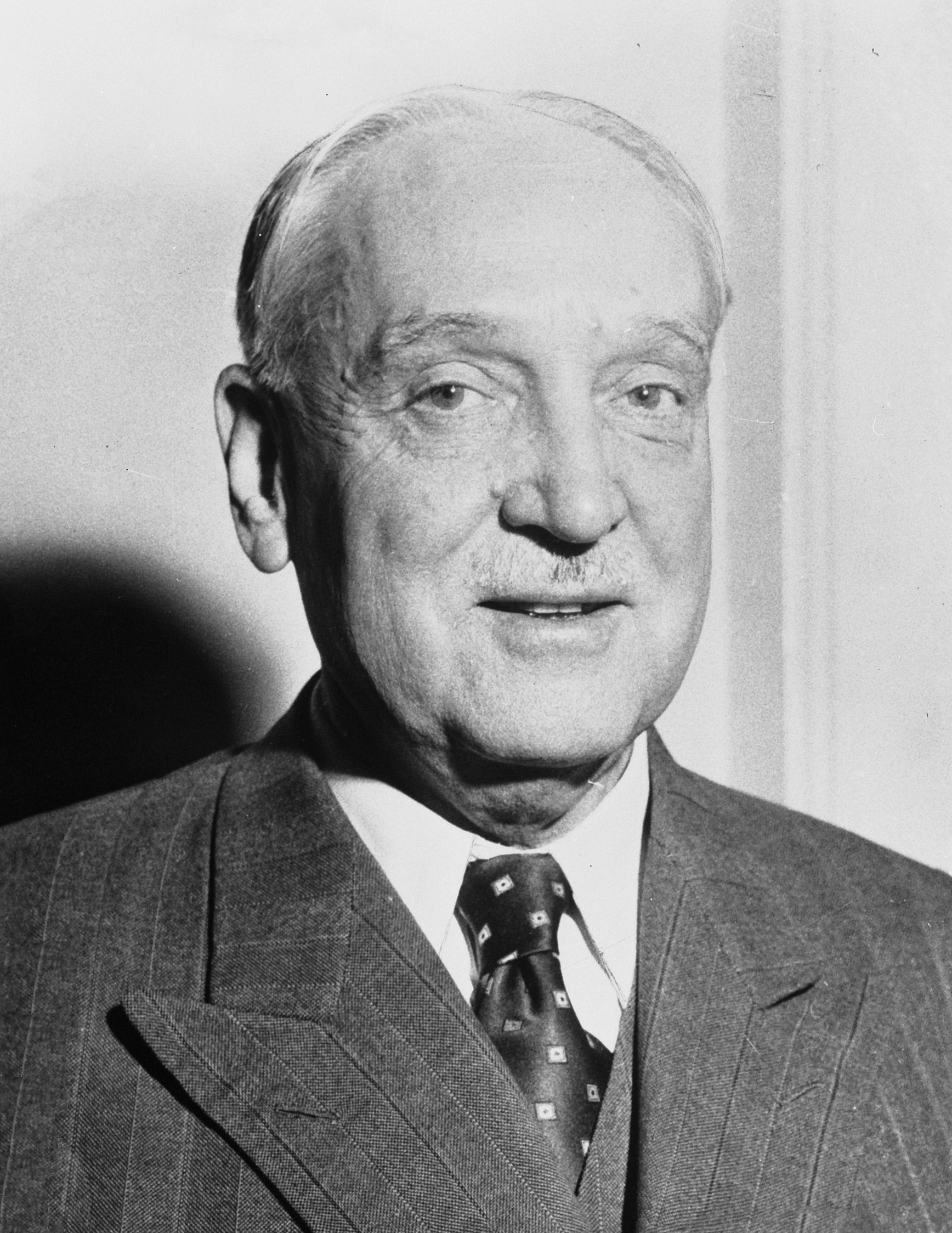

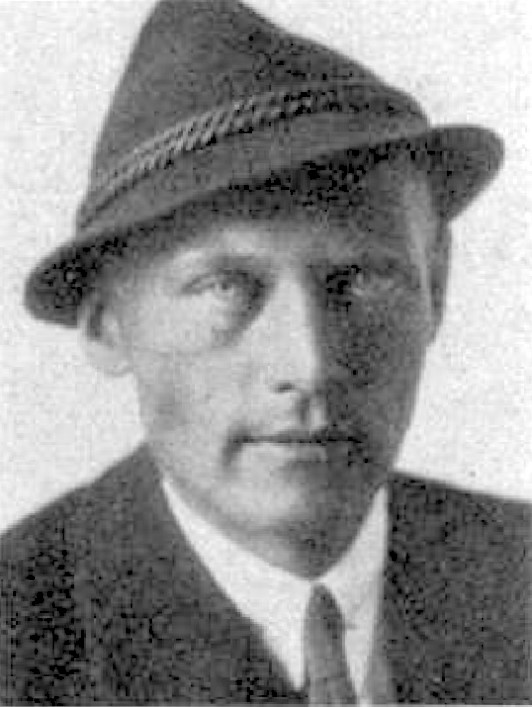

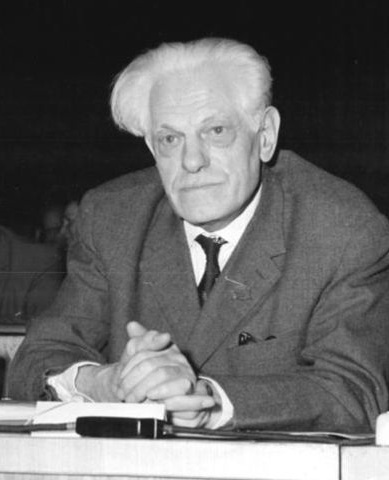
	First party	Second party
Leader	Julius Raab	Adolf Schärf
Party	ÖVP	SPÖ
Last election	41.26%, 74 seats	42.11%, 73 seats
Seats won	82	74
Seat change	▲8	▲1
Popular vote	1,999,986	1,873,295
Percentage	45.96%	43.05%
Swing	▲4.70 pp	▲0.94 pp
	Third party	Fourth party
Leader	Anton Reinthaller	Johann Koplenig
Party	FPÖ	KPÖ
Last election	–	5.28%, 4 seats,
Seats won	6	3
Seat change	New	▼1
Popular vote	283,749	192,438
Percentage	6.52%	4.42%
Swing	New	▼0.86 pp
- Results by constituency
Chancellor before election
Julius Raab
ÖVP
Elected Chancellor
Julius Raab
ÖVP

Parliamentary elections were held in Austria on 13 May 1956. The result was a victory for the Austrian People's Party, which won 82 of the 165 seats in the National Council. Voter turnout was 96%. Although the ÖVP had come up one seat short of an absolute majority, ÖVP leader and Chancellor Julius Raab retained the grand coalition with the Socialists, with the SPÖ leader Adolf Schärf as Vice-Chancellor.

== Results ==
Party	Votes	%	Seats	+/–
Austrian People's Party	1,999,986	45.96	82	+8
Socialist Party of Austria	1,873,295	43.05	74	+1
Freedom Party of Austria	283,749	6.52	6	–8
Communists and Left Socialists	192,438	4.42	3	–1
Free Workers Movement of Austria	1,812	0.04	0	New
Party of Reason	284	0.01	0	New
Ergokratische Party	231	0.01	0	New
Austrian Patriotic Party	83	0.00	0	0
Austrian Middle Class Party	23	0.00	0	New
Parliamentary Representatives of the People prevented from voting, Non-Voters and Invalid Voters	7	0.00	0	New
Total	4,351,908	100.00	165	0
Valid votes	4,351,908	98.29		
Invalid/blank votes	75,803	1.71		
Total votes	4,427,711	100.00		
Registered voters/turnout	4,614,464	95.95		
Source: Nohlen & Stöver

=== Results by state ===
State	ÖVP	SPÖ	FPÖ	KUL	Others
Burgenland	49.2	46.0	3.0	1.9	-
Carinthia	33.7	48.1	15.1	3.1	0.0
Lower Austria	51.8	41.2	2.9	4.0	0.0
Upper Austria	50.4	40.3	7.1	2.2	-
Salzburg	47.2	36.1	14.4	2.3	0.0
Styria	45.6	44.0	6.9	3.5	-
Tyrol	62.9	29.6	6.0	1.5	0.0
Vorarlberg	60.8	26.8	10.3	2.1	-
Vienna	35.9	49.7	5.6	8.5	0.2
Austria	46.0	43.1	6.5	4.4	0.1
Source: Institute for Social Research and Consulting (SORA)
