= 1975 Austrian legislative election =

- 5 October 1975

All 183 seats in the National Council 92 seats needed for a majority
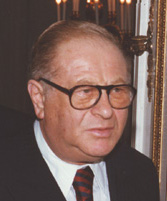

	First party	Second party	Third party
Leader	Bruno Kreisky	Josef Taus	Friedrich Peter
Party	SPÖ	ÖVP	FPÖ
Last election	50.04%, 93 seats	43.11%, 80 seats	6.29%, 10 seats
Seats won	93	80	10
Seat change	Steady	Steady	Steady
Popular vote	2,326,201	1,981,291	249,444
Percentage	50.42%	42.95%	5.41%
Swing	▲0.38 pp	▼0.16 pp	▼0.88 pp
- Seats won by state and nationwide. States are shaded according to the most voted-for party.
Chancellor before election
Bruno Kreisky
SPÖ
Elected Chancellor
Bruno Kreisky
SPÖ

Parliamentary elections were held in Austria on 5 October 1975. The Socialist Party (SPÖ) secured a second consecutive majority government, winning 93 of 183 seats, with Bruno Kreisky remaining Chancellor. Voter turnout was 93%.

== Results ==
Party	Votes	%	Seats	+/–
Socialist Party of Austria	2,326,201	50.42	93	0
Austrian People's Party	1,981,291	42.95	80	0
Freedom Party of Austria	249,444	5.41	10	0
Communist Party of Austria	55,032	1.19	0	0
Group of Revolutionary Marxists	1,024	0.02	0	New
Steinacher Franz List	440	0.01	0	New
Total	4,613,432	100.00	183	0
Valid votes	4,613,432	98.94		
Invalid/blank votes	49,252	1.06		
Total votes	4,662,684	100.00		
Registered voters/turnout	5,019,277	92.90		
Source: Nohlen & Stöver

=== Results by state ===
State	SPÖ	ÖVP	FPÖ	KPÖ	Others
Burgenland	51.8	45.3	2.5	0.4	-
Carinthia	54.7	33.9	10.0	1.4	-
Lower Austria	48.0	48.1	2.9	1.0	-
Upper Austria	44.4	42.6	6.7	0.8	-
Salzburg	45.2	42.5	12.1	0.7	0.2
Styria	50.3	43.9	4.6	1.2	-
Tyrol	37.2	56.8	5.3	0.7	-
Vorarlberg	35.9	53.1	10.2	0.8	-
Vienna	59.8	34.0	4.1	2.0	0.1
Austria	50.4	43.0	5.4	1.2	0.0
Source: Institute for Social Research and Consulting (SORA)

== Aftermath ==
The SPÖ was able to keep their absolute majority in this election as well and continued to appoint Bruno Kreisky as Chancellor. The Kreisky III Federal Government took office on 28 October 1975.

Following the elections, Simon Wiesenthal, at that time the head of the Jewish Documentation Center in Vienna, published a report on the Nazi past of the long-serving Freedom Party of Austria (FPÖ) leader Friedrich Peter. This report revealed that Peter had served as an Obersturmbannführer in an SS unit associated with mass murders. Despite having been a victim of the Nazi regime, Kreisky defended Peter and accused Wiesenthal of employing "Mafia methods" and implied that he had collaborated with the Gestapo.

This public dispute is today referred to as the Kreisky–Peter–Wiesenthal affair. In 1978 Peter did not run again for the position of FPÖ federal party chairman. His successor was the Mayor of Graz Alexander Götz.
