= 1979 general election =

1979 general election may refer to:

- 1979 Austrian legislative election
- 1979 Danish general election
- 1979 Portuguese legislative election
- 1979 Spanish general election
- 1979 Swedish general election
- 1979 United Kingdom general election
- 1979 Zimbabwe Rhodesia general election

== Canada ==
- 1979 Canadian federal election
- 1979 Alberta general election
- 1979 British Columbia general election
- 1977 Manitoba general election
- 1979 Northwest Territories general election
- 1979 Prince Edward Island general election
