= Franz Koch =

Franz Koch may refer to:

- Franz Koch (musician) (1761—1831), German Jew's harp performer
- Franz Koch (cinematographer) (1898–1959), German cameraman
- Franz Koch (writer) (1888–1969), German-Austrian literature historian
- Franz Koch (businessman) (born 1979), German businessman, former CEO of Puma SE
- Franz Koch, Austrian banker and record producer, founder of Koch International
