= Werner Clement =

Austrian economist

Personal details
- Born: 19 April 1941 (age 85) Innsbruck, Austria
- Education: Vienna University of Economics and Business, University of Innsbruck

Werner Clement is an Austrian economist and retired professor of the Vienna University of Economics and Business. He has worked in the field of applied economics, serving with most major international bodies, while also holding academic appointments at major universities.

== Academic career ==
=== Early career ===
Clement gained initial experience in the field of development aid in Senegal and former Upper Volta, which resulted in assisting to establish the first educational plan for Senegal. He graduated from the Vienna University of Economics and Business in 1963 and received his PhD in economics in 1965. He obtained a job as an assistant to the then Austrian Minister of Finance, Stephan Koren, from 1968 to 1970. This resulted in him becoming the youngest full professor nationwide at that time in 1970 at the University of Innsbruck. Specializing in the fields of Human Resources, Economics of Education and the Labour Market, he also served as a founding member of the University of Klagenfurt from 1970 to 1976. While holding the professorial post at Innsbruck University, he led the team which developed the first educational plan in the Provincia Autonoma di Alto Adige (South Tyrol). He was also a consultant to the German Institute for Labour Market and Vocational Research, attached to the Federal Agency of Labour 1976–83.

=== International expert and Qualification 2000 ===
Clement has served in numerous international organizations over many years, including the OECD, Council of Europe, UNESCO, ILO, World Bank, UNIDO etc., working in manpower requirement analysis, educational finance, continuing education etc. Am He served as a country examiner of France, Switzerland, USA, Sweden and Australia and contributed to or chaired the respective OECD reports. In summer 1984, while holding a post at the Ministère du Travail, Paris, he was affiliated to a unit dealing with industrial restructuring in France. In Austria, he chaired the Economic and Social Advisory Board to the Parity Commission delivering a report, entitled "Qualification 2000", which led to the establishment of "Colleges of Higher Education" (Fachhochschule) in Austria.

From early 1980, his interests focussed on structural and industrial economics. He served as a member of (or expert to) consultative bodies in Austria dealing with areas such as economic policy, education, technology, and structural and regional policy. He was also a member of the advisory council of the Austrian People's Party (ÖVP) from 1981 to 1988.

=== Institute of Manufacturing Research (IWI) ===
Among his initiatives was the setting up and chairing of the Institute of Manufacturing Research (IWI, Industriewissenschaftliches Institut) with former Secretary of State Josef Taus, where he served as director from 1985 to 2002. This institute focussed on empirical economic research, employing on average 20 researchers.

In 1993/94, Clement served in Vietnam as a consultant to the Minister of Planning and Investment, Do Quoc Sam. In 1994/95, Clement and an IWI team developed the "Masterplan of the Mechanical Engineering Industry in S.R. Vietnam" for the Ministry of Heavy Industry, Vietnam. These contacts led to a Cooperation Agreement between IWI (Industriewissenschaftliches Institut, Vienna) and CIEM (Central Institute for Economic Management, Hanoi) which remained in force from 1995 to 2003. In 1995, he was a member of the "Leadership Programme"/MITI, Tokyo.

=== Recent career ===
In 2003, Clement launched the Institute of Pharmaeconomic Research (IPF) serving as director of the supervisory board. In 2002, he founded his own company, "4C-Foresee Management Consulting Ltd", working predominantly in the area of R&D and innovation. Contracting institutions are mainly Austrian government ministries and the "Austrian (Research) Council". The company has contributed frequently to strategies or national plans for research and innovation in Austria. Clement's role as scientific advisor to the Ministry of Economics' platform on clusters (2008 – 2010) may also be mentioned. In 2011 he elaborated the "Strategic concept for science and research fostering technology" in the province of Tyrol. Recently the company's focus is on security economics. He serves as an evaluator and scientific advisor to the respective programme (KIRAS). He is also strongly engaged in the ongoing elaboration of a strategy to foster "Innovation-oriented Public Procurement" and chairs the respective working groups. Since 2012 he serves as special adviser to EU Commissioner for Regional Policy, Johannes Hahn.

== Awards and distinctions ==
- 1968 Kardinal Innitzer Promotion Award
- 1980 Kardinal Innitzer Award for Achievements in the Field of Social Sciences
- 1984 Honorary Doctorate University Paris-Sud XI, Faculté Jean Monnet
- 1990 Grand Decoration of Merit for Services rendered to the Republic of Austria
- 2001 Grand Decoration of Merit for Science and Research
- 2012 Grand Decoration of Honour in Silver for Services to the Republic of Austria
- Honorary member of the Johann Sebastian Bach School of music, Vienna
