= Hans Praetterhoffer =

Austrian artist (1943–2014)

- Born: Hans Prätterhoffer; 11 September 1943; Vienna, Austria
- Died: 29 June 2014 (aged 70); Vienna, Austria
- Resting place: Ottakringer Friedhof, Vienna
- Education: Academy of Fine Arts Vienna
- Known for: Painting; Drawing; Printmaking; Light drawings

Hans Praetterhoffer (born Hans Prätterhoffer; 11 September 1943 – 29 June 2014) was an Austrian artist whose practice encompassed painting, drawing and printmaking. He became known in the Austrian art scene of the early 1970s for his Lichtzeichnungen ("light drawings"), long-exposure photographs recording the path of a small light source moved through a darkened room or landscape; from 1970 he also made stereoscopic versions using the anaglyph process.

From 1977 he turned to etching, and later to figure paintings, watercolours and landscapes. In 1982 he won first prize in the second Römerquelle Art Competition. His late work included a cycle of paraphrases after Old Master paintings (2002) and, between 2007 and 2009, a return to light drawing using digital cameras.

His work is held in the collections of the Albertina in Vienna, the Museum der Moderne Salzburg and the Lentos Kunstmuseum Linz.

== Early life and education ==
Praetterhoffer was born in Vienna on 11 September 1943; his father was killed in the Second World War the following year. After private tuition from the painter Gerhard Swoboda and a year at the Academy of Applied Arts (1964–1965), he studied from 1965 to 1969 at the Academy of Fine Arts Vienna in the master class of Sergius Pauser, taking his diploma in 1969. (Note: The Artothek Niederösterreich record and the biography printed in his 1975 catalogue Land-Striche – Strich-Menschen place him in Pauser's master class from 1965 to 1969, and a biography published by Galerie Lang in 1993 also names Pauser as his teacher. The chronology in the group catalogue Arbeiten 1969–1979 (1980) records the 1969 diploma as taken under Rudolf Hausner. The archive of the Academy of Fine Arts Vienna lists him as a student of both.) In 1970 he was a guest student in screen printing and reproduction techniques at Vienna's Graphische Lehr- und Versuchsanstalt.

In 1969 he took part, together with Wolfgang Böhm, Johann Jascha, Heinz Günther Leitner, Reimo Wukounig and Günther Sponheuer, in a self-organised painting symposium at Mettmach in Upper Austria. Five of the group — Sponheuer had returned to Germany — exhibited together in Linz in 1970 and, in October of that year, at the Galerie Seilerstätte in Vienna, where the curator Dieter Schrage wrote in the catalogue that they did not constitute a group and had deliberately refused a unifying name. In 1971 Praetterhoffer changed the spelling of his signature from Prätterhoffer to Praetterhoffer.

== Artistic work ==
=== Light drawings ===
According to the chronology in the group catalogue Arbeiten 1969–1979 (1980), Praetterhoffer began making light drawings in 1969. Working in darkness or at dusk, indoors or in the open air, he moved a small point light source through the space while cameras with open shutters recorded the path of the light; a second exposure of the same scene in daylight added an image of the place to the drawing. From 1970 he made stereoscopic versions by the anaglyph process, collected in the portfolio Waldviertel and viewable in three dimensions through red-and-green glasses.

In the catalogue of the 1974 group exhibition Aspekte der Landschaft, the art historian Werner Fenz discussed a triptych of light drawings made overnight in a garden in Vienna-Ottakring in October 1972 and recorded by cameras arranged in an equilateral triangle. Fenz wrote that the works were not photographs reworked after the fact — "it is the concrete space itself in which the artist moves" — the recorded traces of movement forming the work together with the documented reality of the place. Praetterhoffer, in a catalogue text of 1981, described the process as drawing "directly and spatially into the room", with the reach of his own body setting the scale, and suggested the results might better be called "light sculpture".

His first solo exhibitions, both titled Stereo-3D-Graphik, were held in 1971 at the Galerie Kaiser in Vienna and the Galerie Spony in Essen. Further solo exhibitions followed in 1972 at the Galerie in der Passage of the Erste Österreichische Spar-Casse and, as Raumzeichnungen, Farbfindungen, at the Künstlerhaus Galerie in Vienna. In 1976 he made a series of large figural light drawings at night in the open air, shown at a presentation in his Vienna studio that November.

=== Etching, painting and later work ===
From 1977 a cycle of about sixty etchings displaced the light drawings; a contemporary chronology and a 1986 review in Die Presse both connect them to free jazz, and several are named after its musicians, among them John Coltrane and Cecil Taylor. Praetterhoffer wrote in 1981 that on the copper plate he had recovered the free spatial movement of the light drawings, moving the etching needle across the plate "as in open country". From 1978 he developed Figurenbilder (figure pictures) in tempera, initially built on stencil drawings. The figure pictures were shown at the Galerie G. Armstorfer in Salzburg in 1979 and formed his contribution to the group's 1980 exhibition at the Vienna Secession, documented in a catalogue of its own.

In 1982 he won first prize in the second Römerquelle Art Competition, worth 30,000 schillings, for the watercolour Biomorphes unter der Oberfläche; the prizewinning works were exhibited in Vienna and Klagenfurt and at the Neue Galerie der Stadt Linz.

In 2002 he made Paradiesparaphrasen ("Paradise paraphrases"), a cycle of watercolours and paintings after Old Master works, including the paradise compositions of Veronese and Tintoretto. In an accompanying text he connected the sweeping arcs of these compositions to the arm movements of his earlier light drawing. Between 2007 and 2009 he returned to light drawing, now using two digital cameras and light sources including LEDs and candle flames, presented as stereoscopic paired views. Ill health ended his practice in 2009. He died in Vienna on 29 June 2014 and was buried at the Ottakringer Friedhof.

Praetterhoffer also published short prose. His satirical text "Zum Leben des Leonardo" ("On the Life of Leonardo") appeared in the St. Pölten literary journal das pult in 1970, and an essay on spatial graphics as imaginary architecture in Planen – Bauen – Wohnen the same year.

== Reception and collections ==
Contemporary discussion of Praetterhoffer's work appeared mainly in Austrian exhibition catalogues and newspapers. The profile in the 1982 Römerquelle competition catalogue stated that he had established himself in the Austrian art scene of the early 1970s with the light drawings, and found in the newer watercolours a continuation of his "imaginative network of lines". Reviewing his 1986 exhibition Beseelte Landschaft at the Galerie Contact in Vienna for Die Presse, a critic signing K. S. described him as "a mobile, experimental and risk-taking, persistent and at the same time open painter and graphic artist" whose work combined "baroque and expressive-informal components", and found traces of the earlier light drawings in the new paintings. For his 1983 exhibition at the Österreichische Postsparkasse in Vienna, Peter Baum contributed the catalogue essay "Kraftfelder persönlicher Imagination" ("Force fields of personal imagination"). A 2022 report in the regional newspaper Tips on a Braunau exhibition of his works from a private collection described his figures as expressionist and his landscapes as engagements with legend, including the Barbarossa myth of the Untersberg.

The Albertina in Vienna holds thirteen of his drawings and prints, most dating from between 1969 and 1982, among them the six-part series Space Tug (1969). The Museum der Moderne Salzburg holds twelve works dating from 1973 to 1986, acquired by purchase and by gift between 1982 and 1987. The Lentos Kunstmuseum Linz holds several of his works on paper from the collection of its predecessor, the Neue Galerie der Stadt Linz, among them a 1971 colour screen print from the stereoscopic Waldviertel series. In 1975 the Austrian Federal Ministry for Education and Art bought his mixed-media work Konzert as part of its annual programme of art purchases. He was among the artists included in Die sechziger Jahre: Eine phantastische Moderne (2011), an exhibition drawn from the City of Vienna's collection at the MUSA in Vienna.

== Selected exhibitions and awards ==
=== Solo exhibitions ===
- 1971 – Stereo-3D-Graphik, Galerie Kaiser, Vienna; Galerie Spony, Essen
- 1972 – Stereo-3D-Graphik, Galerie in der Passage, Erste Österreichische Spar-Casse, Vienna
- 1972 – Raumzeichnungen, Farbfindungen, Künstlerhaus Galerie, Vienna
- 1979 – Figurenbilder, Galerie G. Armstorfer, Salzburg
- 1983 – Österreichische Postsparkasse, Vienna
- 1986 – Beseelte Landschaft, Galerie Contact, Vienna
- 1986 – Raumlandschaften, Galerie Altnöder, Salzburg

=== Group exhibitions ===
- 1970 – Böhm · Jascha · Leitner · Prätterhoffer · Wukounig, presented by the association Der Blaue Adler, Galerie Seilerstätte, Vienna
- 1974 – Aspekte der Landschaft, Neue Galerie am Landesmuseum Joanneum, Graz; Kärntner Landesgalerie, Klagenfurt
- 1978 – Kinetik, Kybernetik, Landgalerie, Seebarn
- 1980 – Böhm · Jascha · Leitner · Praetterhoffer · Wukounig, Vienna Secession; Palais Liechtenstein, Feldkirch
- 1982 – 2. Römerquelle-Kunstwettbewerb, Galerie auf der Stubenbastei, Vienna; Klagenfurt; Neue Galerie der Stadt Linz
- 1984 – Zeichner sein, Schloss Sigharting
- 2011 – Die sechziger Jahre: Eine phantastische Moderne, MUSA, Vienna

=== Awards ===
- 1972 – Förderungspreis der Stadt Wien (advancement award of the City of Vienna) (Note: Artothek Niederösterreich dates this award to 1972, as does the biography printed in Praetterhoffer's 1975 catalogue. Wien Geschichte Wiki dates it to 1978.)
- 1978 – Grant of the Theodor Körner Foundation
- 1982 – First prize, 2nd Römerquelle Art Competition
