= National Democratic Party (Austria) =

National Democratic Party Nationaldemokratische Partei
- Leader: Norbert Burger
- Founded: 11 February 1967
- Banned: 25 June 1988
- Split from: Freedom Party of Austria
- Ideology: Neo-Nazism; Austro–German nationalism Racialism; Pan-Germanism; Xenophobia; Anti-immigration
- Political position: Far-right

The National Democratic Party (Nationaldemokratische Partei, NDP) was a far-right political party in Austria from 1967 until 1988 when its status was revoked for violating the country's anti-Nazi legislation.

== Party history ==
The NDP was registered as an association in 1966 in Innsbruck. Its first meeting as a national organisation took place in February 1967 in Linz. The party was founded by Norbert Burger, former chairman of the Ring Freiheitlicher Studenten, the student wing of the Freedom Party of Austria (FPÖ). Burger remained the key figure in the NDP until its dissolution. Further members included Herbert Fritz, and a number of "South Tyrol activists" (Befreiungsausschuss Südtirol). The Austrian NDP was based on the German sister party, the National Democratic Party of Germany. Its first chairman was student Rudolf Watschinger.

The party ran in the 1970 legislative election, receiving 2,631 (0.1%) of the votes cast. It advocated the Anschluss of Austria into Germany and the re-introduction of the death penalty. It also agitated against "superalienation" and "infiltration" by foreign workers (Gastarbeiter). Burger ran in the 1980 presidential election "for a German Austria", gaining 140,741 votes (3.2%). Two years later he and Gerd Honsik initiated a petition for a referendum "against superalienation", which however was not achieved.

== Disbandment and prohibition ==
On 25 June 1988 the NDP was banned by a verdict of the Constitutional Court of Austria on the basis of the Verbotsgesetz 1947 and Article 9 of the Austrian State Treaty (Disbandment of Nazi Organisations), revoking its legal capacity as a political party. In its explanatory statement the court determined that the NDP's "key principles and demands" are based on "biological-racist ideology ("Volksbegriff")" and also that its "pan-German Propaganda" is in agreement with the main goals of the Nazi Party.

As an association the NDP was disbanded on 21 November 1988.

== Bibliography ==
- DÖW (Hg.): Handbuch des österreichischen Rechtsextremismus, Deuticke, Wien 1993 (2. Auflage), ISBN 3-216-30053-6
