= 1980 Austrian presidential election =

- 18 May 1980
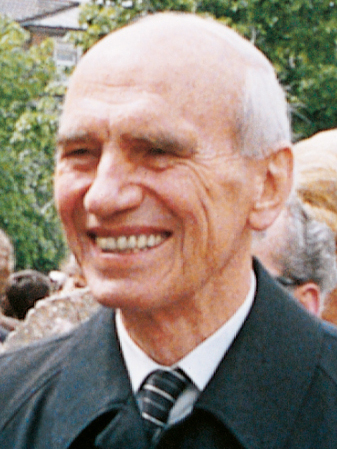
Nominee	Rudolf Kirchschläger	Willfried Gredler
Party	SPÖ–ÖVP	FPÖ
Popular vote	3,538,748	751,400
Percentage	79.87%	16.96%
President before election
Rudolf Kirchschläger
SPÖ
Elected President
Rudolf Kirchschläger
SPÖ

Presidential elections were held in Austria on 18 May 1980. Supported by both major parties, the ruling Socialist Party and opposition Austrian People's Party, incumbent president Rudolf Kirchschläger was re-elected with a landslide of 80% of the vote. The competing candidates were Willfried Gredler of the Freedom Party of Austria and Norbert Burger of the National Democratic Party, which was later banned.

== Results ==
Candidate	Party	Votes	%
Rudolf Kirchschläger	SPÖ–ÖVP	3,538,748	79.87
Willfried Gredler	Freedom Party of Austria	751,400	16.96
Norbert Burger	National Democratic Party	140,741	3.18
Total		4,430,889	100.00
Valid votes		4,430,889	92.71
Invalid/blank votes		348,165	7.29
Total votes		4,779,054	100.00
Registered voters/turnout		5,215,875	91.63
Source: Nohlen & Stöver
