= Friedrich Peter =

Austrian politician (1921–2005)

Chairman of the Freedom Party
- In office 1958–1978
- Preceded by: Anton Reinthaller
- Succeeded by: Alexander Götz

Personal details
- Born: Friedrich Peter; 13 July 1921 Attnang-Puchheim, Austria
- Died: 25 September 2005 (aged 84) Vienna, Austria
- Party: Freedom Party of Austria (1956–2005)
- Other political affiliations: Nazi Party (1938–1945)
- Occupation: Politician

Military service
- Allegiance: Germany
- Branch/service: Waffen-SS
- Years of service: 1938–1945
- Rank: Obersturmführer
- Unit: 1st SS Infantry Brigade
- Battles/wars: World War II; Eastern Front; Western Front

Friedrich Peter (13 July 1921 – 25 September 2005) was an Austrian politician who served as chairman of the Freedom Party of Austria from 1958 to 1978. He was an active Nazi between 1938 and 1945 and an SS-Obersturmführer (First Lieutenant) of the Waffen-SS.

== World War II and SS service ==
Born in Attnang-Puchheim, Upper Austria, as the son of a Social Democratic engine driver and a master baker's daughter, Peter joined the Nazi Party in 1938 and volunteered for the Waffen-SS at the age of 17. During World War II, he served at the western and eastern fronts and achieved the rank of Obersturmführer in the 10th regiment of the 1st SS Infantry Brigade.

Parts of this brigade were attached to Einsatzgruppe C. The Einsatzgruppen systematically shot hundreds of thousands of Jews, Romani, communists, and others behind the front during the summer of 1941. Although his unit was almost exclusively engaged in this activity, Peter denied any involvement or knowledge about them after the war. Historian Martin Cüppers said it was impossible that he did not know what was happening and unlikely that he did not directly participate in such atrocities. After the war, Peter was interned by American forces for a year in Glasenbach.

After his release, he became an elementary school and special education teacher. He was the headmaster of elementary schools in Krühub and St. Pankraz. From 1950 to 1970 he also edited the journal of the Austrian Teachers' Association. In 1968 he became Landesschulinspektor (state school supervisor) of general compulsory schools in Upper Austria.

== Early political career ==
In 1955, Peter was a founding member and first chairman of the "Freedom Party" (Freiheitspartei, FP) in the state of Upper Austria. The FP was initially a more pronouncedly nationalistic spin-off and rival of the declining national-liberal and post-Nazi Federation of Independents (VdU). For the 1955 Upper Austrian state election, FP and VdU launched a joint list, with Peter as the frontrunner. In Upper Austria's Landtag he served as deputy chairman of the "Freedom" parliamentary group. In 1956 FP and VdU merged into the Freedom Party of Austria (FPÖ), whose federal chairman Peter became in 1958. In 1966, he was elected into the Austrian Nationalrat and became the leader of his party's delegation in 1970.

As early as in 1962/1963, the FPÖ began to cautiously approach the Social Democratic Party (SPÖ), which antagonized parts of the right-wing extremist-national wing and caused some members to split away from the party. The SPÖ wanted to maintain the option of a coalition with the FPÖ and also supported that party financially. The idea was to weaken the Austrian People's Party (ÖVP), which turned out not to work. Under Peter's chairmanship, the FPÖ attempted to gain a reputation to become a potential coalition partner and tried to give a liberal impression on the outside. At the party convention of 1964, Peter declared that "nationalists and liberals together have a place in the FPÖ."

This "liberalization" of the party led to some internal resistance, against which Peter reacted by expelling dissenters. However, this process did not thoroughly transform the party, neither in terms of its political program nor in terms of its membership. The political views of the party ranks had not shifted towards liberalism.

Even though the FPÖ had declared during the election campaign that there would not be a "red chancellor", it supported Bruno Kreisky's minority government after the 1970 elections. This greatly increased the party's significance.

== Kreisky–Peter–Wiesenthal affair ==
Simon Wiesenthal, at that time head of the Jewish Historical Documentation Centre in Vienna, published a report on Friedrich Peter's Nazi past after the 1975 elections. The report documented that Peter had served as Obersturmbannführer in an SS unit involved in mass murder. Chancellor Kreisky, who had himself been persecuted by the Nazis, defended Peter and accused Wiesenthal of employing mafia methods and of collaboration with the Gestapo.

In 1978, Peter stepped down as party chairman to be succeeded by the mayor of Graz, Alexander Götz. However, he retained control over the party behind the scenes. After the SPÖ had lost its majority in 1983, he negotiated a coalition between SPÖ and FPÖ with Bruno Kreisky, which took office under the leadership of Chancellor Fred Sinowatz (SPÖ) and vice chancellor Norbert Steger. However, he had to decline the offer to take the office of the third president of the Nationalrat after severe public protests, in order not to endanger the coalition.

== Controversy with Jörg Haider, later life ==
Peter's relationship with Jörg Haider was rather strained. The final split came in 1992 after Haider made a public comment on the "Third Reich's proper employment policies". Peter spoke of a "shameful lapse" by Haider, saying that this statement "forced him to break his self-imposed silence and to remind party leaders of their political and statutory responsibilities in public." Peter later remarked that "when Haider made his employment policy statement, I grabbed my head."

Peter died on 25 September 2005 in Vienna's Hanuschkrankenhaus hospital, where he had been treated for kidney disease for several weeks.

== Political career ==
- 1955–1971 FPÖ State party chairman of Upper Austria
- 1958–1978 FPÖ Federal Party Chairman
- 1955–1966 Member of the Upper Austrian Landtag
- 1966–1986 Member of the Nationalrat
- 1970–1986 Party delegation leader of the FPÖ
- 1992 Resigned his party membership because of the FPÖ's shift to an anti-EC position

Anton Reinthaller	FPÖ Party Chairman; 1958–1978	Alexander Götz
