= Franz Hasiba =

Austrian politician (1932–2026)

Member of the Landtag of Styria
- In office 19 October 1993 – 7 November 2000

President of the Lantag of Styria
- In office 19 October 1993 – 7 November 2000
- Preceded by: Franz Wegart
- Succeeded by: Reinhold Purr

Deputy Governor of Styria
- In office 1991–1993

Mayor of Graz
- In office 21 March 1983 – 10 January 1985
- Preceded by: Alexander Götz
- Succeeded by: Alfred Stingl

Personal details
- Born: 3 August 1932 Graz, Styria, Austria
- Died: 2 August 2026 (aged 93)
- Party: ÖVP
- Occupation: Agricultural engineer

Franz Hasiba (3 August 1932 – 2 August 2026) was an Austrian politician. A member of the Austrian People's Party, he served as mayor of Graz from 1983 to 1985, Deputy Governor of Styria from 1991 until 1993, and a member and president of the Landtag of Styria from 1993 to 2000.

Hasiba died on 2 August 2026, one day before his 94th birthday.
