= 1986 Austrian legislative election =

← 1983	23 November 1986	1990 →

All 183 seats in the National Council 92 seats needed for a majority
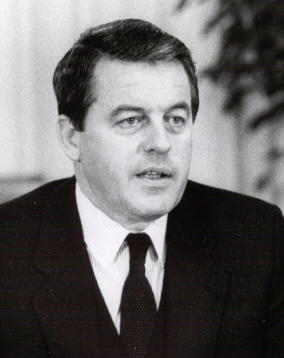

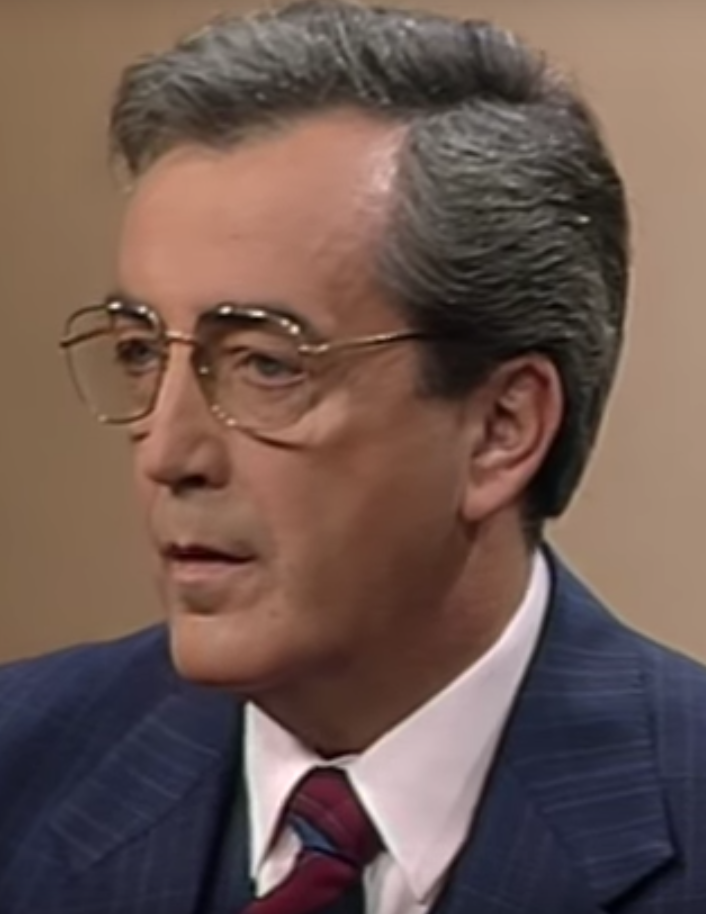

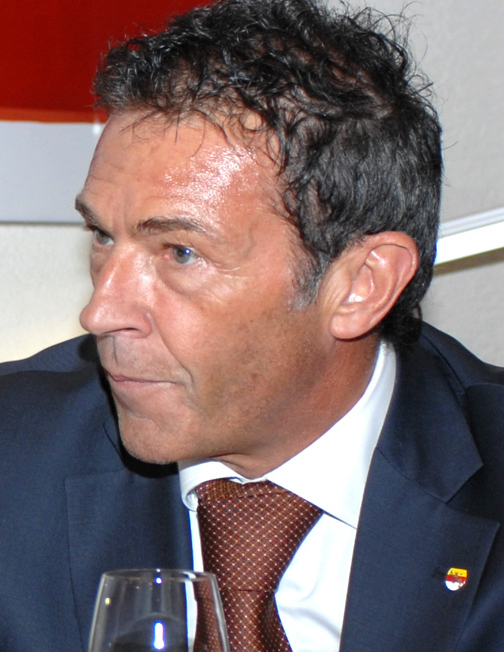

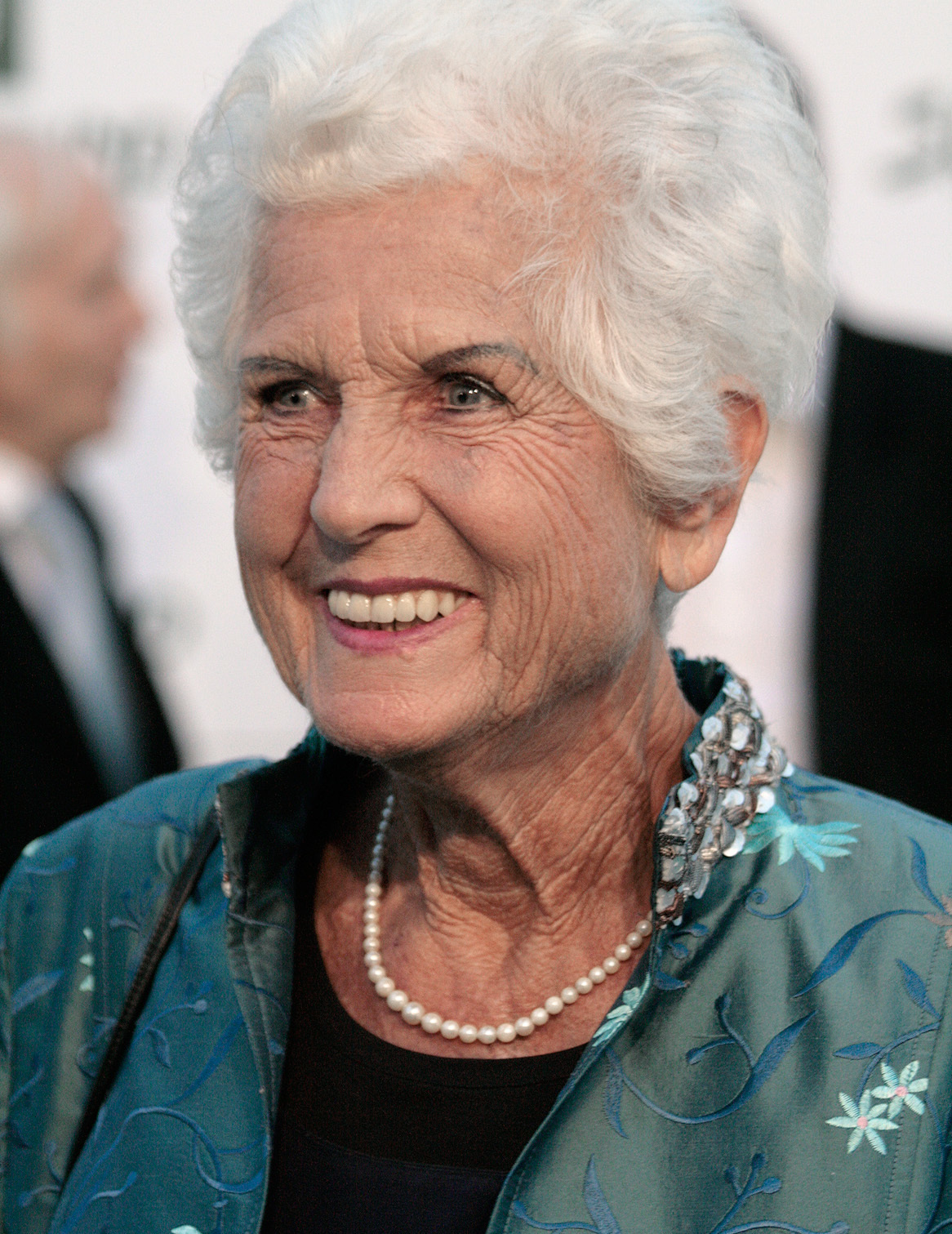
	First party	Second party
Leader	Franz Vranitzky	Alois Mock
Party	SPÖ	ÖVP
Last election	47.65%, 90 seats	43.22%, 81 seats
Seats won	80	77
Seat change	▼10	▼4
Popular vote	2,092,024	2,003,663
Percentage	43.12%	41.29%
Swing	▼4.53pp	▼1.93pp
	Third party	Fourth party
Leader	Jörg Haider	Freda Meissner-Blau
Party	FPÖ	Greens
Last election	4.98%, 12 seats	–
Seats won	18	8
Seat change	▲6	New
Popular vote	472,205	234,028
Percentage	9.73%	4.82%
Swing	▲4.75pp	New
- Results by state
Chancellor before election
Franz Vranitzky
SPÖ
Elected Chancellor
Franz Vranitzky
SPÖ

Early parliamentary elections were held in Austria on 23 November 1986. They were called by Chancellor Franz Vranitzky of the Socialist Party, as he unwilling to continue governing with the Freedom Party following the ousting of liberal Norbert Steger by the right-wing Jörg Haider at the Freedom Party's convention.

The SPÖ won a plurality of seats, and formed a grand coalition with the Austrian People's Party (ÖVP), as neither were willing to work with Haider, with Vranitzky continuing as Chancellor. The Green Alternative won eight seats, marking the first time a party other than the SPÖ, ÖVP and FPÖ had entered parliament since 1959 election. Voter turnout was 90%.

== Results ==
Party	Votes	%	Seats	+/–
Socialist Party of Austria	2,092,024	43.12	80	–10
Austrian People's Party	2,003,663	41.29	77	–4
Freedom Party of Austria	472,205	9.73	18	+6
Green Alternative–Freda Meissner-Blau List	234,028	4.82	8	New
Communist Party of Austria	35,104	0.72	0	0
Action List – I've Had Enough	8,100	0.17	0	New
Green Alternatives – Democratic List	6,005	0.12	0	New
Carinthian Greens–VGÖ–VÖGA–Independent Councillors	1,059	0.02	0	0
Total	4,852,188	100.00	183	0
Valid votes	4,852,188	98.22		
Invalid/blank votes	88,110	1.78		
Total votes	4,940,298	100.00		
Registered voters/turnout	5,461,414	90.46		
Source: Nohlen & Stöver

=== Results by state ===
State	SPÖ	ÖVP	FPÖ	GRÜNE	Others
Burgenland	49.0	42.8	5.4	2.5	0.3
Carinthia	47.2	27.2	20.9	3.8	0.9
Lower Austria	42.4	47.3	6.1	3.6	0.6
Upper Austria	42.0	41.5	11.0	4.9	0.6
Salzburg	36.7	40.9	15.9	5.9	0.5
Styria	44.1	41.0	9.9	4.1	0.9
Tyrol	29.2	53.2	11.3	5.8	0.6
Vorarlberg	25.5	53.1	11.9	8.8	0.7
Vienna	52.4	33.2	5.8	6.1	2.6
Austria	43.1	41.3	9.7	4.8	1.0
Source: Institute for Social Research and Consulting (SORA)
