= Anton Reinthaller =

Austrian member of the Nazi party (1895–1958)

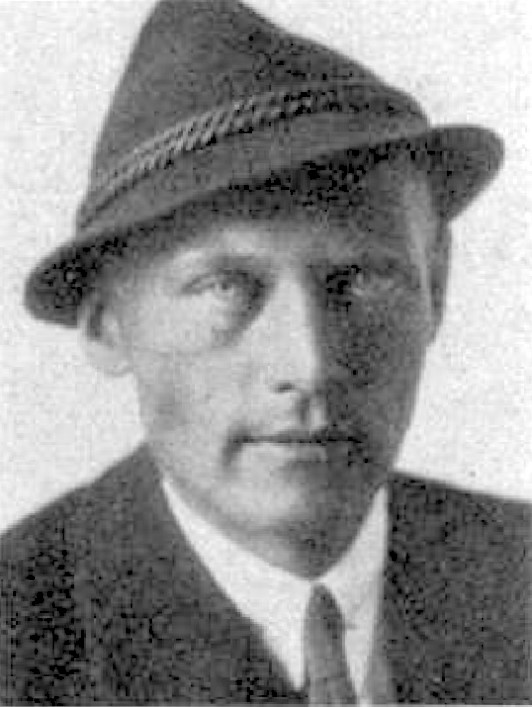

Chairman of the Freedom Party
- In office 1956–1958
- Preceded by: Office established
- Succeeded by: Friedrich Peter

Personal details
- Born: 14 April 1895 Mettmach, Cisleithania, Austria-Hungary
- Died: 6 March 1958 (aged 62) Innviertel, Austria
- Party: Landbund (until 1928); Nazi Party (Austria) (1928–1938); Nazi Party (1938–1945); Federation of Independents; Freedom Party of Austria (from 1955)
- Awards: Golden Party Badge

Military service
- Allegiance: Austria-Hungary; Nazi Germany
- Branch/service: Austro-Hungarian Army; Schutzstaffel
- Years of service: 1914-1918 (Austro-Hungarian Army); 1938-1945 (Schutzstaffel)
- Rank: Leutnant; SS-Brigadeführer
- Battles/wars: World War I; Eastern Front; Brusilov offensive (POW)

Anton Reinthaller (14 April 1895 – 6 March 1958) was an Austrian politician active before and after the Second World War. After a career in Nazi Germany as an SS-Brigadeführer and member of the Nazi Reichstag, he was the inaugural leader of the Freedom Party of Austria (FPÖ).

== Early life ==
Born in Mettmach (Upper Austria), Reinthaller served in World War I. He was taken prisoner of war by Russian Army in 1916 before being exchanged in June 1918. He held the rank of Leutnant der Reserve. Returning to Austria, Reinthaller studied at the Agricultural College and became a forestry engineer in Lilienfeld, Attersee and Haus im Ennstal.

== Pre-war political activity ==
Politically, Reinthaller initially belonged to the Landbund before switching to support the Nazis in 1928. He rose through the ranks of Austria's Nazi set-up, becoming state peasant leader in 1934, although his moderate stance, particularly with regards to the use of violence, meant that he was often in conflict with Theodor Habicht who feared that Reinthaller was preparing to break away and form a specifically Austrian Nazi movement that would reject union with Germany. However Habicht did not move against Reinthaller, who enjoyed good personal relations with Rudolf Hess and Richard Walther Darré, albeit ultimately he was removed after he spearheaded his own negotiations with Engelbert Dollfuß.

Although he had no real involvement in the failed July Putsch, Reinthaller was nonetheless held for a while at the Kaisersteinbruch detention camp where he met and befriended Ernst Kaltenbrunner who, despite his own more radical views, became a supporter of Reinthaller. In 1935, with the backing of Kaltenbrunner and Franz Langoth, Reinthaller attempted to negotiate an agreement with Kurt Schuschnigg in which he sought to unite Austria's Sturmabteilung and Schutzstaffel with other rightist groups in the service of the Fatherland Front (Austria) as part of a National Front. However, radical Nazi leader Josef Leopold stepped in, as he felt Reinthaller was diluting the impact of Austria's Nazis too much and had him deprived of his party positions in 1937. Reinthaller stepped away from active politics after this, although he remained a voice of dissent on the sidelines, attacking Nazi anti-Semitism on the basis of its negative impact on international opinion of the Nazis, whilst also resisting any move to complete Anschluss.

== Under Nazism ==
Although Reinthaller had lost his positions in the Austrian Nazi Party and previously opposed the Anschluss, he made a political comeback following the Nazi takeover. At the parliamentary election of 10 April, he was elected as a Nazi deputy to the Reichstag from the newly renamed Ostmark. He served as Minister for Agriculture in the cabinet of Arthur Seyss-Inquart from 12 March 1938 to 30 April 1939. Following this, he was appointed Undersecretary of State to the Reich Ministry of Food and Agriculture under his old friend Darré, and went on to fill a number of positions for the Nazi government, including Gauamtsleiter of the Lower Danube Landvolk, head of the Landesernährungsamt Donauland (regional Food Office) and an honorary Brigadeführer (Major General) in the SS. Having initially joined the SS in December 1938 (with the membership number 292,775) he achieved his highest rank on 30 January 1941.

In April 1938, the Donau-Zeitung reported that Reinthaller took the Austrian Wotan steamer to Passau, where he welcomed German transport minister Julius Dorpmüller to Austria. Two days later, the newspaper stated that Reinthaller was still inspecting facilities along the Danube.

== Post-war activism ==
In August 1945, Reinthaller was arrested by U.S. occupation authorities and sent to an internment camp in Salzburg. He was transferred to Nuremberg, then to an internment camp in Dachau in July 1947. He was later sent back to Nuremberg, and released from custody on 8 November 1948. He was ordered to wait in Bavaria to await the ruling of a denazification tribunal in his case. However, on 1 July 1949 the Counterintelligence Corps arrested Reinthaller at the request of Austrian police in Vienna, and extradited him to Austria to await trial.

Along with Rudolf Neumayer (Finance Minister) and Guido Schmidt (Foreign Minister under Schuschnigg), Reinthaller was brought before the Austrian People's Court and accused of "high treason against the Austrian people", with the three labelled as being those most responsible for the Anschluss. Reinthaller was acquitted of high treason, but found guilty of being an active member of the Nazi Party before the Anchluss. He was sentenced to three years in prison and had part of his assets confiscated. As he had been imprisoned from the end of the war, Reinthaller was released on account of time served, on 26 October 1950.

After the war, Reinthaller became an advocate of the 'Third force' in Austrian politics. On this basis he was chosen to lead the FPÖ when it replaced the Federation of Independents in 1956. Before long Reinthaller once again became an important figure in Austrian politics as, despite his Nazi origins, Julius Raab made a deal with Reinthaller in 1957 that he would ensure that the FPÖ did not nominate a candidate for the Presidency. As a result, Raab was thus nominated as a joint Austrian People's Party-FPÖ candidate. Reinthaller died in Innviertel in 1958, with the leadership of the FPÖ passing to Friedrich Peter.

According to the historian Lothar Höbelt, Reinthaller was the "ideal Nazi" for the first generation of the FPÖ. There were no signs of insight or regret in Reinthaller's diary entries. He saw himself as a "victim" of "victor's justice". Reinthaller, who had not known about the gassings, rejected the attempted extermination of the Jews, labelling it Hitler's "madness" and "monstrous". However, he continued to hold a milder version of the Nazi racial ideology. Reinthaller believed that the Jews had "declared [themselves] a belligerent power" in 1934 and had "called for a fight against Germany." This, he said, was why "there was stricter police treatment of German Jews." Reinthaller claimed that the yellow badge was introduced to protect against enemy propaganda and espionage. As for the Holocaust, he rejected collective responsibility against the German people, Austrian people, and Nazi Party, instead blaming individual perpetrators.

== Sources ==
- Heinz-Dietmar Schimanko: Der Fall Reinthaller. Das Strafverfahren gegen Anton Reinthaller vor dem Volksgericht (The Case Reinthaller. The Criminal Procedure against Anton Reinthaller at the People´s Court), Wien u. a.: Böhlau 2019, ISBN 978-3-205-23186-8.

Party political offices
Preceded by ---	FPÖ Party Chairman; 1956–1958	Succeeded by Friedrich Peter
