= Mettmach =

- Municipality
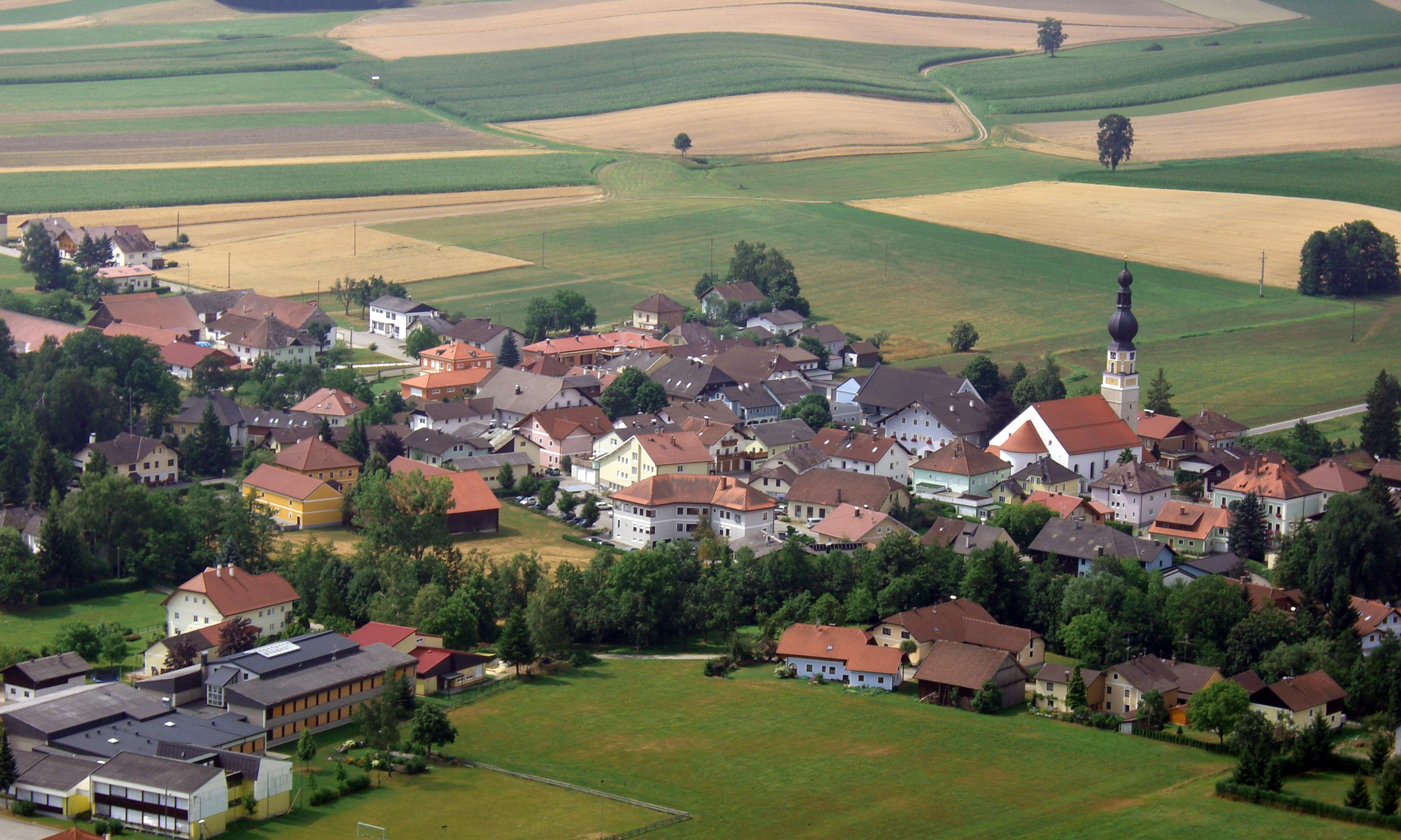

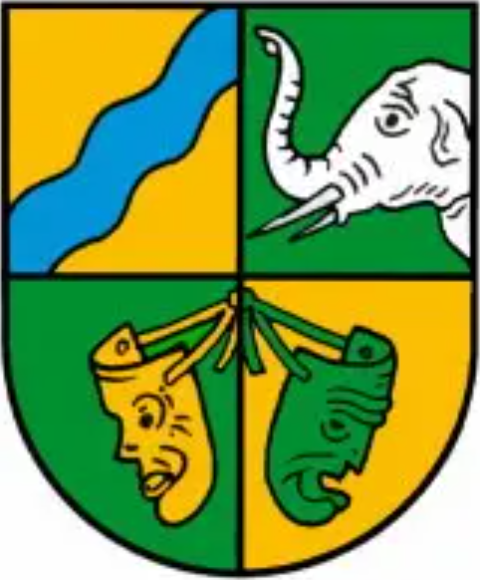
- Coat of arms

- Location within Austria
- Coordinates: 48°10′25″N 13°20′42″E
- Country: Austria
- State: Upper Austria
- District: Ried im Innkreis

Government
  - Mayor: Erich Gaisbauer (ÖVP)

Area
  - Total: 29.56 km^{2} (11.41 sq mi)
- Elevation: 464 m (1,522 ft)

Population (2018-01-01)
  - Total: 2,355
  - Density: 79.67/km^{2} (206.3/sq mi)
- Time zone: UTC+1 (CET)
  - Summer (DST): UTC+2 (CEST)
- Postal code: 4931
- Area code: 07755
- Vehicle registration: RI
- Website: www.mettmach.at

Mettmach is a municipality in the district of Ried im Innkreis in the Austrian state of Upper Austria. It is best known as the home of Anton Reinthaller.

== History ==
Until the late 18th Century, Mettmach belonged to the Electorate (later Duchy) of Bavaria. In 1779 the Innviertel region, including Mettmach, was transferred to the Habsburg Monarchy and became a part of Upper austria.

Cultural Traditions have played a notable role in Mettmach. One of the most significant event being the "Mettmacher Passionsspiele", a passion play, performed in multi-year intervals, involving local participation.

== Population ==
Historical population
Year	Pop.	±%
1869	2,101	—
1880	2,048	−2.5%
1890	2,138	+4.4%
1900	2,108	−1.4%
1910	2,131	+1.1%
1923	2,187	+2.6%
1934	2,200	+0.6%
1939	2,077	−5.6%
1951	2,339	+12.6%
1961	2,233	−4.5%
1971	2,363	+5.8%
1981	2,473	+4.7%
1991	2,573	+4.0%
2001	2,557	−0.6%
2013	2,423	−5.2%
