= 1983 Austrian legislative election =

← 1979	24 April 1983	1986 →

All 183 seats in the National Council 92 seats needed for a majority
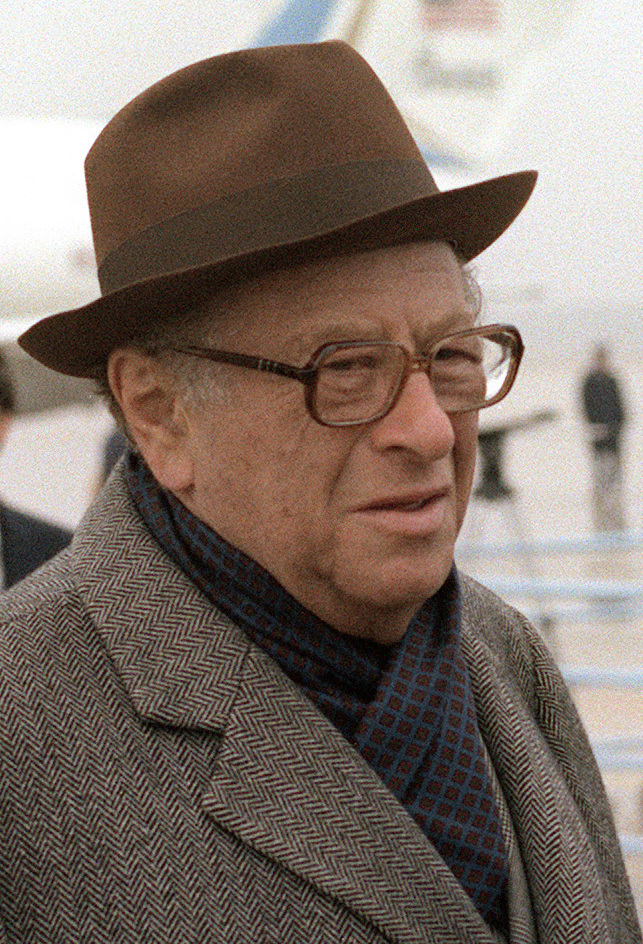

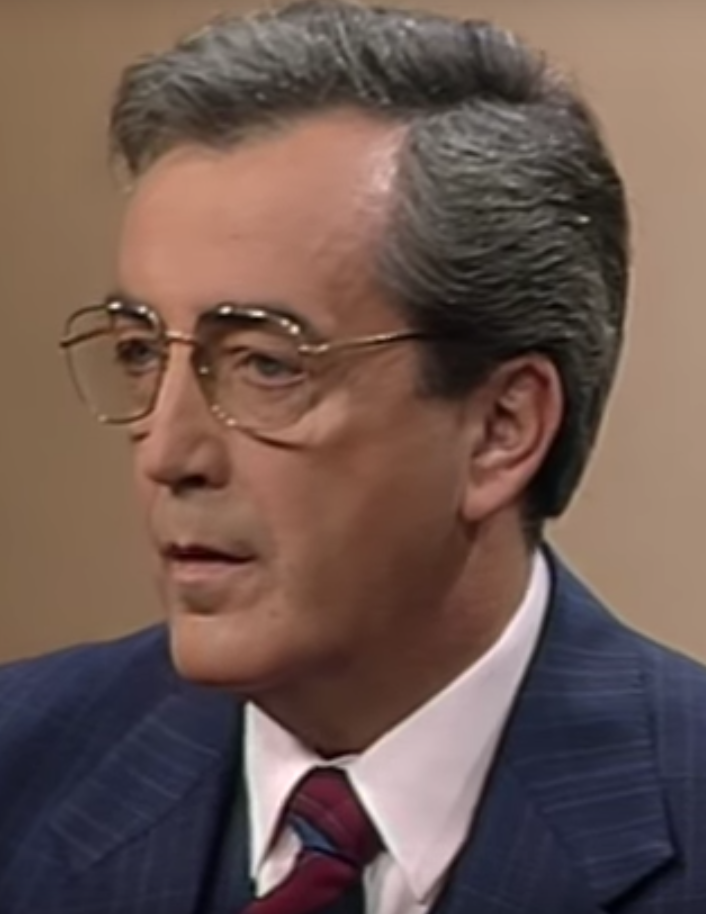

	First party	Second party	Third party
Leader	Bruno Kreisky	Alois Mock	Norbert Steger
Party	SPÖ	ÖVP	FPÖ
Last election	51.03%, 95 seats	41.90%, 77 seats	6.06%, 11 seats
Seats won	90	81	12
Seat change	▼5	▲4	▲1
Popular vote	2,312,529	2,097,808	241,789
Percentage	47.65%	43.22%	4.98%
Swing	▼3.38 pp	▲1.32 pp	▼1.08 pp
- Results by state
Chancellor before election
Bruno Kreisky
SPÖ
Elected Chancellor
Fred Sinowatz
SPÖ

Parliamentary elections were held in Austria on 24 April 1983. The result saw the Socialist Party win 90 of 183 seats, enough to secure them a fifth term in government, albeit without the absolute majority the party had held since 1971. This prompted Bruno Kreisky to stand down as SPÖ leader and Chancellor in favour of Fred Sinowatz. The SPÖ subsequently formed a coalition with the Freedom Party of Austria, which was still a liberal party at the time. Voter turnout was 93%.

== Results ==
Party	Votes	%	Seats	+/–
Socialist Party of Austria	2,312,529	47.65	90	–5
Austrian People's Party	2,097,808	43.22	81	+4
Freedom Party of Austria	241,789	4.98	12	+1
United Greens of Austria	93,798	1.93	0	New
Alternative List Austria	65,816	1.36	0	New
Communist Party of Austria	31,912	0.66	0	0
Austria Party	5,851	0.12	0	New
Stop Immigrants Movement	3,914	0.08	0	New
Total	4,853,417	100.00	183	0
Valid votes	4,853,417	98.60		
Invalid/blank votes	69,037	1.40		
Total votes	4,922,454	100.00		
Registered voters/turnout	5,316,436	92.59		
Source: Nohlen & Stöver

=== Results by state ===
State	SPÖ	ÖVP	FPÖ	Others
Burgenland	51.4	44.3	2.2	2.2
Carinthia	52.9	32.1	10.7	4.3
Lower Austria	45.9	48.1	3.0	3.0
Upper Austria	46.3	43.5	6.0	4.2
Salzburg	41.3	46.1	8.0	4.6
Styria	49.4	42.3	4.0	4.3
Tyrol	34.8	57.4	4.4	3.4
Vorarlberg	27.3	60.3	7.2	5.2
Vienna	56.6	33.6	4.4	5.4
Austria	47.7	43.2	5.0	4.1
Source: SORA
