= Freedom Party of Austria =

Far-right political party in Austria

Freedom Party of Austria Freiheitliche Partei Österreichs
- Abbreviation: FPÖ
- Chairman: Herbert Kickl
- Secretaries-General: Christian Hafenecker; Michael Schnedlitz
- Leader in the National Council: Herbert Kickl
- Leader in the EP: Harald Vilimsky
- Founder: Anton Reinthaller
- Founded: 7 April 1956; 70 years ago
- Preceded by: Federation of Independents
- Headquarters: Theobaldgasse 19/4; A-1060 Vienna
- Newspaper: Neue Freie Zeitung
- Student wing: Ring Freiheitlicher Studenten
- Youth wing: Ring Freiheitlicher Jugend
- Membership (2017): 60,000
- Ideology: Völkisch nationalism; National conservatism; Right-wing populism; Euroscepticism; Historical: National liberalism; German nationalism
- Political position: Far-right
- European affiliation: Patriots.eu (since 2024) (Note: The party was formerly part of ID Party (2019–2024) and MENF (2015–2019).)
- European Parliament group: Patriots for Europe (since 2024) (Note: The party was formerly part of ID Group (2019–2024), ENF (2015–2019), were Non-Inscrits (2007–2015), ITS (2007) and were Non-Inscrits (1996–2007).)
- International affiliation: Liberal International; (1978–1993)
- Colours: Blue
- Anthem: Immer wieder Österreich; ('Always Austria')
- National Council: 57 / 183
- Federal Council: 16 / 60
- European Parliament: 6 / 20
- Governorships: 1 / 9
- Landtag Seats: 110 / 440

Party flag

Website
- fpoe.at
- Politics of Austria; Political parties; Elections; A: Before its rightward shift, it was classified as a centre-to-centre-right party, supporting national liberalism and pan-Germanism from 1956 to 1986.

The Freedom Party of Austria (Note: Sometimes referred to as the Liberal Party) (German: Freiheitliche Partei Österreichs, FPÖ) is a far-right political party in Austria, described as right-wing populist, völkisch nationalist and Eurosceptic. It has been led by Herbert Kickl since 2021. It is the largest of five parties in the National Council, with 57 of the 183 seats, and won 28.85% of votes cast in the 2024 election and it is represented in all nine state legislatures. On a European level, the FPÖ is a founding member of the Patriots.eu (originally the Movement for a Europe of Nations and Freedom) and its six MEPs sit with the Patriots for Europe (PfE) group following the dissolution of its predecessor, Identity and Democracy (ID).

The FPÖ was founded in 1956 as the successor to the short-lived Federation of Independents (VdU), representing pan-Germanists and national liberals opposed to socialism and Catholic clericalism, represented by the Social Democratic Party of Austria (SPÖ) and the Austrian People's Party (ÖVP), respectively. Its first leader, Anton Reinthaller, was a former Nazi functionary and SS officer, but the FPÖ did not advocate far-right policies and presented itself as a centrist party. The FPÖ was long the third largest in Austria and had modest support. Under the leadership of Norbert Steger in the early 1980s, it sought to style itself on Germany's Free Democratic Party (FDP). The FPÖ gave external support to SPÖ chancellor Bruno Kreisky (SPÖ) after the 1970 election and joined Fred Sinowatz's government, as the SPÖ's junior partner, after the 1983 election.

Jörg Haider became leader of the party in 1986, after which it began an ideological turn towards right-wing populism. This resulted in a strong surge in electoral support, but also led the SPÖ to break ties, and a splinter in the form of the Liberal Forum in 1993. In the 1999 election, the FPÖ won 26.9% of the vote, becoming the second-most popular party, ahead of the ÖVP by around 500 votes. The two parties eventually reached a coalition agreement in which the ÖVP retained the office of chancellor. The FPÖ soon lost most of its popularity, falling to 10% in the 2002 election, but remained in government as junior partner. Internal tensions led Haider and much of the party leadership to leave in 2005, forming the Alliance for the Future of Austria (BZÖ), which replaced the FPÖ as governing partner. Heinz-Christian Strache then became leader, and the party gradually regained its popularity, peaking at 26.0% in the 2017 election. The FPÖ once again became junior partner in government with the ÖVP. In May 2019, the Ibiza affair led to the collapse of the government and the resignation of Strache from both the offices of vice-chancellor and party leader. The resulting snap election saw the FPÖ fall to 16.2% and return to opposition. On 30 June 2024, ANO 2011, the Freedom Party of Austria, and Fidesz created a new alliance named Patriots for Europe.

== History ==
=== Political background ===
The FPÖ is a descendant of the pan-German and national liberal camp (Lager) dating back to the Revolutions of 1848 in the Habsburg areas. During the interwar era, the national liberal camp (gathered in the Greater German People's Party) fought against the mutually hostile Christian Social and Marxist camps in their struggles to structure the new republic according to their respective ideologies. After a short civil war, the Fatherland Front established the Federal State of Austria, an Austrofascist dictatorship, in 1934. By 1938, with the Anschluss of Austria into Nazi Germany, the national liberal camp (which had always striven for an inclusion of Austria into a Greater Germany) had been swallowed whole by Austrian National Socialism, and all other parties were eventually absorbed into Nazi totalitarianism. Both Socialists and Christian Socials were persecuted under the Nazi regime, and the national liberal camp was scarred after the war due to guilt by association with National Socialism.

In 1949, the Federation of Independents (VdU) was founded as a national liberal alternative to the main Austrian parties—the Social Democratic Party (SPÖ) and the Austrian People's Party (ÖVP), successors to the interwar-era Marxist and Christian Social parties. The VdU was founded by two liberal Salzburg journalists—former prisoners of Nazi Germany—who wanted to stay clear of the mainstream socialist and Catholic camps and feared that hostility following the hastily devised postwar denazification policy (which did not distinguish between party members and actual war criminals) might stimulate a revival of Nazism. Aiming to become a political home to everyone not a member of the two main parties, the VdU incorporated an array of political movements—including free-market liberals, populists, former Nazis and German nationalists, all of whom had been unable to join either of the two main parties. The VdU won 12% of the vote in the 1949 general election, but saw its support begin to decline soon afterward. It evolved into the FPÖ by 1955/56 after merging with the minor Freedom Party in 1955; a new party was formed on 17 October 1955, and its founding congress was held on 7 April 1956.

=== Early years (1956–1980) ===
The FPÖ started shortly after the Austrian government effectively ended Austrian denazification, which many experts describe as half-hearted. This paved the way for former Nazis to once again gain positions of power, and indeed the first FPÖ party leader was Anton Reinthaller, a former Nazi Minister of Agriculture and SS officer. He had been asked by ÖVP Chancellor Julius Raab to take over the movement rather than let it be led by a more socialist-leaning group. At the time of the party's founding, former Nazis formed a greater percentage of FPÖ members than the other contemporary parties. Because of the many former Nazis in the party, it was seen as a right wing extremist party, and was excluded from government at every level until the mid 1960s, except for the 1957 presidential election, when it ran a joint candidate with the ÖVP, who lost. However over time the former Nazis rebranded themselves as centrists pursuing pragmatic, non-ideological policies, and the FPÖ presented itself as a moderate party. The FPÖ served as a vehicle for them to integrate in the Second Republic; the party was a coalition partner with both the SPÖ and ÖVP in regional and local politics, although it was excluded at the national level.

Reinthaller was replaced as leader in 1958 by Friedrich Peter (also a former SS officer), who led the party through the 1960s and 1970s and moved it towards the political centre. In 1966, the ÖVP–SPÖ Grand Coalition, which had governed Austria since the war was broken, was ended when the ÖVP gained enough votes to govern alone. In 1967 the more extreme faction in the FPÖ broke away and established the National Democratic Party, seen by some observers as a final shedding of the party's Nazi legacy. After the 1970 election, the FPÖ became the kingmaker and supported an SPÖ minority government led by Chancellor Bruno Kreisky. Under the influence of Kreisky, a new generation of liberals brought the FPÖ into the Liberal International in 1978. During the years under Peter the party never won more than 8% of the national vote in general elections, and generally did not have much political significance.

=== Steger leadership (1980–1986) ===
Liberal Norbert Steger was chosen as new FPÖ party leader in 1980; in an effort to gain popularity, he helped the FPÖ become established as a moderate centrist liberal party. His vision was to transform the FPÖ into an Austrian version of the German Free Democratic Party (FDP), focusing on free-market and anti-statist policies. In the 1980s, the Austrian political system began to change; the dominance of the SPÖ and ÖVP started to erode, and the Austrian electorate began to swing to the right. SPÖ leader Bruno Kreisky had encouraged the FPÖ's move to the centre, in order to establish an SPÖ-FPÖ alliance against the ÖVP. The 1983 general election was a watershed; the SPÖ lost its absolute majority in Parliament, which resulted in the formation of an SPÖ-FPÖ "Small Coalition". Ironically, the 1983 election result was the worst for the FPÖ in its history (it received slightly less than 5% of the vote), and during the next few years the party saw 2–3% support—or even less—in opinion polls. As a consequence, the party was soon torn by internal strife.

In 1983, the right-wing Jörg Haider took over the leadership of the FPÖ's significant Carinthia branch. Its importance dated to the Kärntner Abwehrkampf (Carinthian defensive struggle) following World War I, and subsequent anti-Slavic sentiment arising from a fear of being taken over by Yugoslavia. Encouraged by the mass media, a struggle soon developed between Steger and Haider over the future of the party. In the 1985 Reder case, for instance, Haider staunchly supported FPÖ Minister of Defence Friedhelm Frischenschlager when the latter welcomed convicted Waffen-SS war criminal Walter Reder in person when Reder arrived at Graz Airport after his release from Italy. (Note: The SPÖ and its chairman Bruno Kreisky did not criticise Reder's release itself, as they themselves had pleaded Italy for it, but that it was Frischenschlager's official state reception of Reder that remained controversial.) While the FPÖ struggled with its low support at the national level in the mid-1980s, this was in sharp contrast to the party's position in Haider's Carinthia (where the party had increased its support from 11.7% in the 1979 provincial election to 16% in 1984).

During the 1986 National Convention in Innsbruck, the internal struggle developed into an open conflict; this led Haider to victory as new FPÖ party leader with 58% of the vote, supported by conservative and pan-German factions. However, incoming SPÖ Chancellor Franz Vranitzky—who also entered office in 1986—had strong negative feelings towards Haider, who he felt was too far-right. Vranitzky subsequently announced an election in 1986, in the process disbanding the SPÖ-FPÖ "Small Coalition" and, after the election, entered into a coalition with the ÖVP. Under Haider's leadership, the FPÖ increased its vote to 9.7%, while the party gradually became more right-wing and its former liberal influence waned. As the FPÖ increased its electoral support with Haider's radical-populist rhetoric, the party reduced its chances of forming coalitions with other parties.

=== Haider leadership (1986–2000) ===
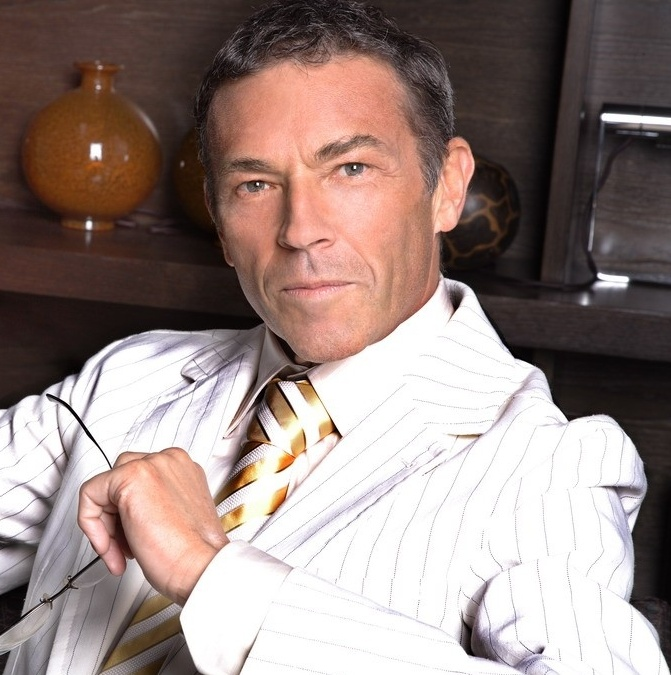
Jörg Haider (2007)

With Jörg Haider as the new party leader, the 1989 Carinthia provincial election caused a sensation; the SPÖ lost its majority and the ÖVP was relegated to third-party status, as the FPÖ finished second with 29% of the vote. The FPÖ formed a coalition with the ÖVP, with Haider as Governor of Carinthia (at this point his greatest political triumph). By the 1990 general election the party had moved away from the liberal mainstream course, instead focusing on immigration and becoming increasingly critical of the political establishment and the EU. Following a remark made by Haider in 1991 about the "decent employment policy" of Nazi Germany (in contrast to that of the current Austrian government), (Note: The incident started when Haider proposed in parliament to require able-bodied welfare recipients to accept public service work assignments. Following this proposal, an SPÖ delegate shouted that the proposal was akin to the forced labour of the Third Reich, which led Haider to retort; "at least in the Third Reich there was a decent employment policy, which is more than can be said for what your government in Vienna can manage." Haider later apologized and distanced himself from his remark.) he was removed as governor by a joint SPÖ-ÖVP initiative and replaced by the ÖVP's Christof Zernatto. Later that year, however, the FPÖ saw gains made in three provincial elections (most notably in Vienna).

While Haider often employed controversial rhetoric, his expressed political goals included small government with more direct democracy. Following the increasing importance of immigration as a political issue, in 1993 the party decided to launch the "Austria First!" initiative (calling for a referendum on immigration issues). The initiative was controversial and five FPÖ MPs, including Heide Schmidt, left the party and founded the Liberal Forum (LiF). The FPÖ's relations with the Liberal International also became increasingly strained, and later that year the FPÖ left the Li (which was preparing to expel it). In turn, the LiF soon joined the Liberal International instead. In 1999, Haider was again elected Governor of Carinthia.

=== Coalition government (2000–2005) ===
In the 1999 general election the FPÖ won 27% of the votes, more than in any previous election—beating the ÖVP for the first time by a small margin. In February 2000, the ÖVP agreed to form a coalition government with the FPÖ. Normally, Haider should have become federal chancellor. However, it soon became apparent that Haider was too controversial to be part of the government, let alone lead it. Amid intense international criticism of the FPÖ's participation in the government, the FPÖ ceded the chancellorship to Wolfgang Schüssel of the ÖVP. As a concession to the FPÖ, the party was given the power to appoint the Ministers of Finance and Social Affairs. Later that month Haider stepped down as party chairman, replaced by Susanne Riess-Passer. Having threatened a diplomatic boycott of Austria, the other fourteen European Union (EU) countries introduced sanctions after the government had been formed; other than formal EU meetings, contacts with Austria were reduced. The measures were justified by the EU, which stated that "the admission of the FPÖ into a coalition government legitimises the extreme right in Europe."

The party had been kept on the sidelines for most of the Second Republic, except for its brief role in government in the 1980s. Along with the party's origins and its focus on issues such as immigration and questions of identity and belonging, the party had been subjected to a strategy of cordon sanitaire by the SPÖ and ÖVP. The EU sanctions were lifted in September after a report had found that the measures were effective only in the short term; in the long run, they might give rise to an anti-EU backlash. Some observers noted an inconsistency in that there had been no sanctions against Italy when the post-fascist Italian Social Movement/National Alliance had entered government in 1994.

The FPÖ struggled with its shift from an anti-establishment party to being part of the government, which led to decreasing internal stability and electoral support. Its blue collar voters became unhappy with the party's need to support some neo-liberal ÖVP economic reforms; the government's peak in unpopularity occurred when tax reform was postponed at the same time that the government was planning to purchase new interceptor jets. Internecine strife erupted in the party over strategy between party members in government and Haider, who allied himself with the party's grassroots. Several prominent FPÖ government ministers resigned in the 2002 "Knittelfeld Putsch" after strong attacks by Haider, which led to new elections being called.

In the subsequent election campaign, the party was deeply divided and unable to organise an effective political strategy. It changed leaders five times in less than two months, and in the 2002 general election decreased its share of the vote to 10.2%, almost two-thirds less than its previous share. Most of its voters sided with the ÖVP, which became the largest party in Austria with 43% of the vote. Nevertheless, the coalition government of the ÖVP and FPÖ was revived after the election; however, there was increasing criticism within the FPÖ against the party's mission of winning elections at any cost.

=== Haider's departure for BZÖ ===
After an internal row had threatened to tear the FPÖ apart, former chairman Jörg Haider, then-chairwoman and his sister Ursula Haubner, vice chancellor Hubert Gorbach and all of the FPÖ ministers left the party and on 4 April 2005 founded a new political party called the Alliance for the Future of Austria (BZÖ). Austria's chancellor Wolfgang Schüssel followed, changing his coalition with the FPÖ into cooperation with the BZÖ. In Haider's stronghold of Carinthia, the local FPÖ branch became the Carinthia branch of the BZÖ.

=== Strache's early leadership (2005–2017) ===
The FPÖ fared much better than the BZÖ in polls following the 2005 split, with the first tests in regional elections in Styria and Burgenland. On 23 April 2005 Heinz-Christian Strache was elected as new chairman of the FPÖ, taking over from interim leader Hilmar Kabas. As most of the party's office-seeking elite had gone over to the BZÖ, the FPÖ was again free from responsibility. Under Strache the party's ideology grew more radical, and it returned to its primary goal of vote-maximising. The FPÖ did reasonably well in that October's Vienna election, in which Strache was the leading candidate and ran a campaign directed strongly against immigration. It took a 14.9% share, while the BZÖ won just 1.2%.

By the 2006 general election, the FPÖ returned to promoting anti-immigration, anti-Islam and Eurosceptic issues. It won 11% of the vote and 21 seats in parliament, while the BZÖ only barely passed the 4% threshold needed to enter Parliament. The subsequent coalition between the SPÖ and the ÖVP left both parties in opposition. In the 2008 general election both the FPÖ and the BZÖ rose significantly at the expense of the SPÖ and the ÖVP. Both parties increased their percentage of the vote by about 6.5%, with the FPÖ at 17.4% and the BZÖ at 10.7%— together gaining 28.2%, and thus both breaking the record vote for the FPÖ in the 1999 election. In the 2009 European Parliament election the FPÖ doubled its 2004 results, winning 12.8% of the vote and 2 seats.

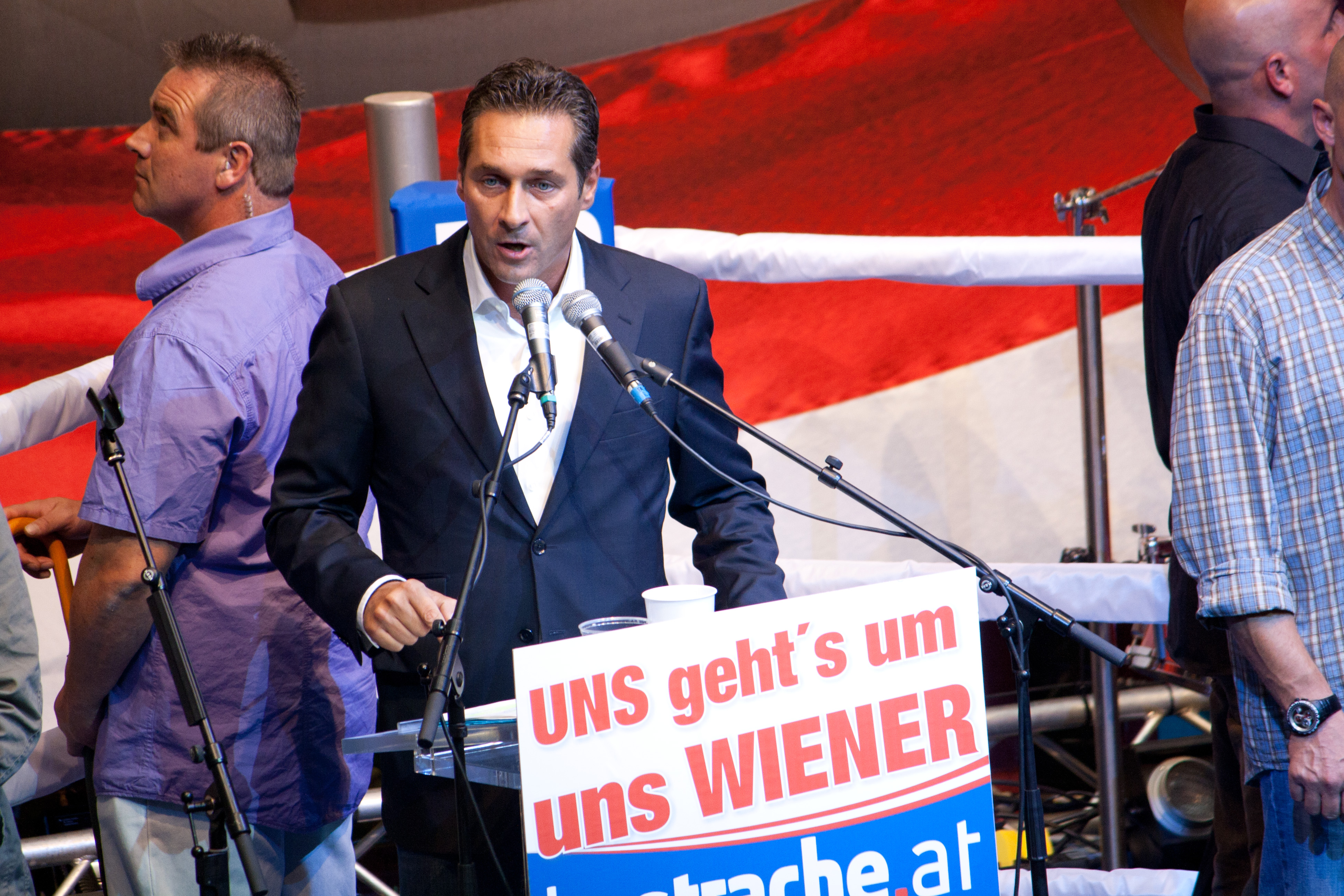
Heinz-Christian Strache, speaking at a rally before the 2010 Vienna elections

In December 2009 the local Carinthia branch of the BZÖ, its stronghold, broke away and founded the Freedom Party in Carinthia (FPK); it cooperated with the FPÖ at the federal level, modeling itself on the German CDU/CSU relationship. The leader of the branch, Uwe Scheuch, had fallen out with BZÖ leader Josef Bucher after the latter had introduced a "moderate, right-wing liberal" and more economically oriented ideology. In the 2010 Vienna elections, the FPÖ increased its vote to 25.8% (slightly less than the record result of 1996); this was seen as a victory for Strache, due to his popularity among young people. This was only the second time in the postwar era that the SPÖ lost its absolute majority in the city.

After its convention in early 2011 midway between general elections, the FPÖ had a support in opinion polls of around 24–29%—at par with the SPÖ and ÖVP, and above the BZÖ. Among people under 30 years of age, the FPÖ had the support of 42%.

In the 2013 legislative election the party obtained 20.51% of votes, while BZÖ scored 3.53% and lost all of its seats. After the election SPÖ and ÖVP renewed their coalition and FPÖ remained in opposition.

In June 2015 the main part of the federal party section of Salzburg split off and formed the Free Party Salzburg.

In the 2016 Austrian presidential election, Freedom Party candidate Norbert Hofer won the first round of the election, receiving 35.1% of the vote, making that election the Freedom Party's best ever election result in its history. However, in the second round, Hofer was defeated by Alexander Van der Bellen, who received the support of 50.3% compared to Hofer's 49.7%. In July first the Constitutional Court of Austria voided the results of the second round due to mishandling of postal votes; although the court did not find evidence of deliberate manipulation. The re-vote took place on 4 December 2016 when Van der Bellen won by a significantly larger margin.

=== Coalition government (2017–2019) ===
In the 2017 Austrian legislative election, the FPÖ obtained 26% of votes, increased its seats by eleven seats to 51 seats, achieving its best result since the 1999 election. It was leading every other party until Sebastian Kurz became the leader of the ÖVP, and polling still predicted it would reach second place. Despite the FPÖ's decline in support during the election campaign, it still achieved an ideological victory as Austria's governing parties, particularly the ÖVP under Kurz but also the SPÖ, shifted noticeably to the right, adopting much of the FPÖ's policies.

The FPÖ entered coalition talks with the ÖVP, and in December 2017, they reached an agreement and created a coalition government. The FPÖ gained control over six ministries, including defense, the interior, and foreign affairs.

During the ÖVP-FPÖ coalition, the BVT intelligence agency was raided, an event that led to significant political fallout and allegations of FPÖ involvement.

=== Ibiza affair (May 2019) ===
In mid-May 2019, secretly made footage was released, apparently showing Strache soliciting funds for the party from a purported Russian national. In the video, Strache also suggests his intention to censor the Austrian media in a way that would favor the FPÖ, citing the media landscape of Orban's Hungary.

The footage led to the collapse of the coalition with the ÖVP on 20 May 2019.

=== Post-Ibiza era (since 2019) ===
In the 2019 general election the party's support collapsed to 16%, down from 26% in 2017. In the aftermath of the election they collapsed to a record low of 10% in April 2020, with 23–25% in November 2022.

Norbert Hofer replaced Strache as party leader in September 2019, just before the election, but resigned on 1 June 2021. On 7 June 2021, Herbert Kickl was elected the new leader of the party by the central party committee, confirmed at a party convention vote on 19 June 2021.

In the 2024 Austrian legislative election the Party's support increased from 16% to 29.2% of the vote, placing first and achieving its best result in the party's history. Since then, the party rapidly surged upwards in many different polls, reaching 35–37% in many polls in late 2024. Following the collapse of coalition talks between the ÖVP, SPÖ and NEOS, Kickl was appointed to form Austria's government in January 2025, but after five weeks of negotiations with the ÖVP failed to form a government coalition.

== Ideology and platform ==
Historically, from its foundation until a rightward shift that commenced in 1986, the FPÖ was a broadly liberal party whose ideology comprised national liberalism, pan-Germanism and anti-clericalism, with a significant classical-liberal minority faction. While initializing as a right-wing party, after it moderated in 1967 it was classified as a centre-to-centre-right party, and was considered the Austrian counterpart of Germany's Free Democratic Party (FDP).

The FPÖ has traditionally been part of the "national liberal" camp, and generally identifies with a freiheitlich (libertarian) profile. However, since the rise to party leadership of Jörg Haider in 1986, the FPÖ departed from liberalism and left the Liberal International (of which it had been a member since 1978), causing the split of the Liberal Forum, and has variously been described as national-conservative, right-wing populist, "right-conservative", "right-national" and far-right. Leading current party members such as Andreas Mölzer and Harald Vilimsky have considered themselves as national liberal "cultural Germans", while Barbara Rosenkranz has considered her ideology as national conservative.

Under the leadership of Heinz-Christian Strache (2005–2019), the FPÖ focused on describing itself as a Heimat and "social" party, portraying itself as a guarantor of Austrian identity and social welfare state. Economically, it has supported regulated liberalism with privatisation and low taxes, combined with support for the welfare state; however, in 2010 it maintained that it would be impossible to uphold the welfare state if current immigration policies were continued.

=== Populism ===
==== Individual freedom ====
The principle of individual freedom in society was already one of the central points in the FPÖ (and VdU's) programme during the 1950s. The party did not regard its liberalism and its pan-German, nationalist positions as contradictory. From the late 1980s until the 1990s, the party developed economically, supporting tax reduction, less state intervention and more privatisation. From the late 2000s the party took a more populist tack, combining this position with qualified support for the welfare state. According to a 2020 study, the party's policy on welfare "is restricted to the mitigation of welfare retrenchment for the core workforce, whereas the party has been a protagonist of tax cuts, trade union disempowerment and, more recently, welfare chauvinism." It criticised unemployment and alleged welfare-state abuse by immigrants which, it said, threatened the welfare state and pensioners' benefits.

==== Anti-establishment ====
During the 1980s and 1990s, Austrian voters became increasingly disaffected with the rule by the two major parties (SPÖ and ÖVP). This coincided with the leadership of Haider, who presented the FPÖ as the only party which could seriously challenge the two parties' dominance. The party strongly criticised the power concentrated in the hands of the elite, until the FPÖ joined the government in 2000. In the 1990s the party advocated replacing the Second Austrian Republic with a Third Republic, since it sought a radical transformation from "a party state to a citizens' democracy". The party wanted to provide more referendums, directly elect the federal chancellor, significantly reduce the number of ministries, and devolve power to the federal states and local councils. Surveys have shown that anti-establishment positions were one of the top reasons for voters to vote for the FPÖ. Its anti-establishment position proved incompatible with being in government during the first half of the 2000s, but was renewed after most of the parliamentary group left to join the BZÖ in 2005.

=== Nationalism ===
==== Heimat ====
From the mid-1980s, the concept of Heimat (a word meaning both "the homeland" and a more general notion of cultural identity) has been central to the ideology of the FPÖ, although its application has slightly changed with time. Initially, Heimat indicated the feeling of national belonging influenced by a pan-German vision; the party assured voters in 1985 that "the overwhelming majority of Austrians belong to the German ethnic and cultural community." Although it was noted then that Austria was the mother country which held the national traditions, this would later be favoured more explicitly over the pan-German concept. In 1995 Haider declared an end to pan-Germanism in the party, and in the 1997 party manifesto the former community of "German people" was replaced with the "Austrian people". Under the leadership of Strache, the concept of Heimat was promoted and developed more deeply than it had been previously. After his re-election as chairman in 2011, the German aspects of the party's programme were formally reintroduced.

==== Immigration and Islam ====
Immigration was not a significant issue in Austria until the 1980s. Under Haider's leadership, immigration went from being practically non-existent on the list of most important issues for voters before 1989, to the 10th-most-important in 1990, and the second-most-important in 1992. In 1993, the controversial "Austria First!" initiative attempted to collect signatures for a referendum on immigration restrictions and asserted that "Austria is not a country of immigration."

The party maintained that "the protection of cultural identity and social peace in Austria requires a stop to immigration", maintaining that its concern was not against foreigners, but to safeguard the interests and cultural identity of native Austrians. Although during the late 1990s the party attacked the influence of Islamic extremism, this was later expanded to include "Islamisation" and the increasing number of Muslims in general. According to The Economist, the hostility to Muslims is "a strategy that resonates with voters of Serbian background, whom the party has assiduously cultivated." The party has also vowed to outlaw the distribution of free copies of the Koran.

During the period of ÖVP-FPÖ government, many amendments were introduced to tighten the country's immigration policies. The number of new asylum applications, for example, was reduced from 32,000 in 2003 to 13,300 in 2006.

=== Foreign policy ===
==== Europe ====
At the end of the Cold War, the FPÖ became more Eurosceptic, which was reflected by its change from Pan-Germanism to Austrian nationalism. The party's opposition to the European Union grew stronger in the 1990s. The FPÖ opposed Austria's joining the EU in 1994, and promoted an unsuccessful popular initiative against the replacement of the Austrian schilling with the euro in 1998. Citing perceived differences between Turkish and European culture, the party opposes the accession of Turkey to the EU; it has declared that should this happen, Austria must immediately leave the EU. Previous party leader Norbert Hofer has said that Austria should consider a referendum on EU membership should Turkey join the block or if the EU makes any further attempt to become a federal superstate. In 2012 the party advocated the introduction of a hard north euro and a soft south euro.

Strache declared himself "a friend of the Serbs", who constitute one of the largest immigrant groups in Austria. Siding with Serbia, the FPÖ rejects the independence of Kosovo. In 2016, the FPÖ called to lift "damaging and pointless" international sanctions against Russia approved by the EU. In 2022 the party continued to oppose sanctions on Russian energy, calling for a national referendum on the issue.

On 30 March 2023, lawmakers from the party walked out of the lower house of Austria's parliament during a speech by the Ukrainian president Volodymyr Zelenskyy in protest at this claimed violation of Austria's national principle of neutrality.

==== Other regions ====
The party's views on the United States and the Middle East have evolved over time. Despite the anti-American views of some right-wing forums in the 1970s and 1980s, chiefly rooted in worries over US cultural expansion and hegemonic role in world politics at the expense of Europe, the FPÖ were more positively inclined towards the United States under Haider's leadership in the late 1980s and 1990s. However, this changed in 2003 after Haider visited Saddam Hussein on the eve of the Iraq War; he subsequently condemned US foreign policy and derided US president George W. Bush as not being very different from Hussein. This move was strongly criticised by the FPÖ, which was then part of the government. Nevertheless, in the mid- to late 2000s, the FPÖ too criticised US foreign policy as promoted by Bush, which it saw as leading to increased levels of violence in the Middle East. The party also became more critical of Israel's part in the Israel–Palestine conflict.

By 2010, under Heinz-Christian Strache's leadership, the party became more supportive of Israel. In December 2010, the FPÖ (along with the representatives of like-minded rightist parties) visited Israel, where they issued the "Jerusalem Declaration", which affirmed Israel's right to exist and defend itself, particularly against Islamic terror. The party recognises Jerusalem as Israel's capital. At the FPÖ's invitation, Israeli Druze MK Ayoob Kara of the Likud party subsequently visited Vienna. After the October 7 2023 attacks, FPÖ leader Kickl expressed unequivocal support for Israel's right to self-defense, and called for Austria to advocate for Israel within the EU by opposing resolutions critical of Israel and supporting Israeli security measures. Kickl declined to back a ceasefire in the Gaza war, stating, "As long as the terrorists of Hamas hold Israeli hostages captive, a ceasefire is unlikely". He also supported an Austrian role in negotiations between the Israelis and Palestinians for a two-state solution.

Strache, at about the same time, said he wanted to meet with the front figures of the American Tea Party movement (which he described as "highly interesting").

== Organisation ==
=== Party leaders ===
The following is a list of the party leaders of the FPÖ:

No.	Portrait	Party leader	Took office	Left office	Time in office
1	Anton Reinthaller	Anton Reinthaller (1895–1958)	7 April 1956	1958	1–2 years
2	Friedrich Peter	Friedrich Peter (1921–2005)	1958	1978	19–20 years
3	Alexander Götz	Alexander Götz (1928–2018)	1978	November 1979	0–1 years
4	Norbert Steger	Norbert Steger (born 1944)	November 1979	13 September 1986	6 years, 316 days
5	Jörg Haider	Jörg Haider (1950–2008)	13 September 1986	1 May 2000	13 years, 231 days
6	Susanne Riess-Passer	Susanne Riess-Passer (born 1961)	1 May 2000	8 September 2002	2 years, 246 days
7	Mathias Reichhold [de]	Mathias Reichhold (born 1957)	8 September 2002	18 October 2002	40 days
8	Herbert Haupt	Herbert Haupt (born 1947)	18 October 2002	3 July 2004	1 year, 259 days
9	Ursula Haubner	Ursula Haubner (born 1945)	3 July 2004	5 April 2005	276 days
–	Hilmar Kabas	Hilmar Kabas (born 1942); Acting	5 April 2005	23 April 2005	18 days
10	Heinz-Christian Strache	Heinz-Christian Strache (born 1969)	23 April 2005	19 May 2019	14 years, 26 days
11	Norbert Hofer	Norbert Hofer (born 1971)	14 September 2019	1 June 2021	1 year, 260 days
12	Herbert Kickl	Herbert Kickl (born 1968)	7 June 2021		5 years, 164 days

=== International relations ===
Even before joining the supranational Movement for a Europe of Nations and Freedom (MENF; now renamed Patriots.eu) in 2014, the FPÖ had ties with several European political parties and groupings. Additionally, according to political analyst Thomas Hofer, the party's policies and brash style helped inspire like-minded parties across Europe.

==== 1970s–2000s ====
In 1978, under the party's liberal leadership, the FPÖ became a member of the Liberal International, which it left in 1993, forestalling its imminent exclusion. In the early years of Haider's leadership, around 1990, meetings were held with figures such as Jean-Marie Le Pen of the French National Front and Franz Schönhuber of the German Republicans.

In the late 1990s, however, he chose to distance himself from Le Pen, and refused to join Le Pen's EuroNat project. Following the FPÖ's entrance in government in 2000, Haider sought to establish his own alliance of right-wing parties. For his project, Haider tried to establish stable cooperations with the Vlaams Blok party in Belgium and the Northern League party in Italy, as well as some other parties and party groupings. In the end, the efforts to establish a new alliance of parties were not successful.

Under the leadership of Strache, the party has cooperated mainly with the Northern League, Vlaams Belang (successor to the Vlaams Blok, which it has traditionally maintained good ties with), and the Pro Germany Citizens' Movement in Germany. The FPÖ also has contacts with the Danish People's Party, the Slovak National Party, the Sweden Democrats, the Hungarian Fidesz, the Lithuanian Order and Justice, IMRO – Bulgarian National Movement, the Dutch Party for Freedom, Alternative for Germany and the German Freedom party. In 2007, the party's then-only MEP was a member of the short-lived Identity, Tradition and Sovereignty grouping in the European Parliament.

==== Since 2010 ====
Outside the EU, it has contacts with the Swiss People's Party, the Bosnian Alliance of Independent Social Democrats and the United Russia party.

Until 2010, it also had contacts with Tomislav Nikolić of the Serbian Progressive Party (formerly of the Serbian Radical Party). Subsequently, the party had relations with the Serbian People's Party. Predominantly through its secretary-general, Harald Vilimsky, the party also maintains ties with elements of the U.S. Republican Party, particularly the Young Republicans, Republicans for National Renewal and the College Republicans of America.

At a conference in 2011, Strache and the new leader of the French National Front, Marine Le Pen, announced deeper cooperation between their parties. Shortly thereafter, the FPÖ attempted to become a member of the Europe for Freedom and Democracy group, but was vetoed by some of its party members. The party's two MEPs in 2011 were individual members of the establishing European Alliance for Freedom.

However, it rejected association with Steve Bannon's The Movement, stating that its alliances in Europe would be pursued independently of influence from the United States.

Though the FPÖ previously had relations with the Israeli Likud, Likud stated in 2022 that it had not had contact with the FPÖ since the resignation of Strache as party leader. Vilimsky blamed Oskar Deutsch of the Jewish Community of Vienna for the deterioration in relations, and suggested that the FPÖ would seek relations with other right-wing parties in Israel which Deutsch does not have influence over. The FPÖ claimed Likud had re-established relations in February 2025, following Likud's decision to join Patriots.eu, but Likud subsequently distanced itself, noting that the FPÖ had "not yet taken a firm, public, and unambiguous stance in support of Israel", while expressing openness to future ties if the FPÖ took a more pro-Israel stance. After the 2014 European elections, the party joined the National Front, the Northern League, Vlaams Belang and the Czech Civic Conservative Party in forming the Movement for a Europe of Nations and Freedom, and participated along with these parties, the Dutch Party for Freedom (PVV), the Alternative for Germany (AfD), the Polish Congress of the New Right and a former member of the UK Independence Party in the Europe of Nations and Freedom (ENF) parliamentary group.

The party subsequently joined ENF's successor, the Identity and Democracy (ID) group, in 2019, alongside the League, the National Rally, Vlaams Belang, the Estonian Conservative People's Party (EKRE), the Finns Party, the Danish People's Party, the Czech Freedom and Direct Democracy, the AfD and the PVV. The FPÖ opposed the expulsion of the AfD from the ID group in May 2024.

Alongside the Hungarian Fidesz and the Czech ANO, the FPÖ was a founding member of the Patriots for Europe group in the European Parliament, hosting its announcement event in Vienna in June 2024.

== Election results ==
=== National Council ===
Election	Leader	Votes	%	Seats	+/–	Government
1956	Anton Reinthaller	283,749	6.52 (#3)	6 / 165	New	Opposition
1959	Friedrich Peter	336,110	7.70 (#3)	8 / 165	▲2	Opposition
1962	Friedrich Peter	313,895	7.04 (#3)	8 / 165	0	Opposition
1966	Friedrich Peter	242,570	5.35 (#3)	6 / 165	▼2	Opposition
1970	Friedrich Peter	253,425	5.52 (#3)	6 / 165	0	Supporting SPÖ minority
1971	Friedrich Peter	248,473	5.45 (#3)	10 / 183	▲4	Opposition
1975	Friedrich Peter	249,444	5.41 (#3)	10 / 183	0	Opposition
1979	Alexander Götz	286,743	6.06 (#3)	11 / 183	▲1	Opposition
1983	Norbert Steger	241,789	4.98 (#3)	12 / 183	▲1	SPÖ–FPÖ majority
1986	Jörg Haider	472,205	9.73 (#3)	18 / 183	▲6	Opposition
1990	Jörg Haider	782,648	16.63 (#3)	33 / 183	▲15	Opposition
1994	Jörg Haider	1,042,332	22.50 (#3)	42 / 183	▲9	Opposition
1995	Jörg Haider	1,060,175	21.89 (#3)	41 / 183	▼1	Opposition
1999	Jörg Haider	1,244,087	26.91 (#2)	52 / 183	▲11	ÖVP–FPÖ majority
2002	Herbert Haupt	491,328	10.01 (#3)	18 / 183	▼34	ÖVP–FPÖ majority (2002–2005)
2002	Herbert Haupt	491,328	10.01 (#3)	18 / 183	▼34	Opposition (2005–2006)
2006	Heinz-Christian Strache	519,598	11.04 (#4)	21 / 183	▲3	Opposition
2008	Heinz-Christian Strache	857,028	17.54 (#3)	34 / 183	▲13	Opposition
2013	Heinz-Christian Strache	962,313	20.51 (#3)	40 / 183	▲6	Opposition
2017	Heinz-Christian Strache	1,316,442	25.97 (#3)	51 / 183	▲11	ÖVP–FPÖ majority (2017–2019)
2017	Heinz-Christian Strache	1,316,442	25.97 (#3)	51 / 183	▲11	Opposition (2019)
2019	Norbert Hofer	772,666	16.17 (#3)	31 / 183	▼20	Opposition
2024	Herbert Kickl	1,408,514	28.85 (#1)	57 / 183	▲26	Opposition

=== President ===
Election	Candidate	First round result			Second round result		
Election	Candidate	Votes	%	Result	Votes	%	Result
1957	Wolfgang Denk	2,159,604	48.9	2nd place	—N/a		
1963	did not contest						
1965	did not contest						
1971	did not contest						
1974	did not contest						
1980	Willfried Gredler	751,400	17.0	2nd place	—N/a		
1986	Otto Scrinzi	55,724	1.2	4th place	—N/a		
1992	Heide Schmidt	761,390	16.4	3rd place	—N/a		
1998	did not contest						
2004	did not contest						
2010	Barbara Rosenkranz	481,923	15.2	2nd place	—N/a		
2016	Norbert Hofer	1,499,971	35.1	Runner-up	2,124,661	46.2	Lost
2022	Walter Rosenkranz	717,097	17.7	2nd place	—N/a		

=== European Parliament ===
Election	List leader	Votes	%	Seats	+/–	EP Group
1996	Franz Linser	1,044,604	27.53 (#3)	6 / 21	New	NI
1999	Daniela Raschhofer	655,519	23.40 (#3)	5 / 21	▼1	NI
2004	Hans Kronberger	157,722	6.31 (#5)	1 / 18	▼4	NI
2009	Andreas Mölzer	364,207	12.71 (#4)	2 / 19	▲1	NI
2014	Harald Vilimsky	556,835	19.72 (#3)	4 / 18	▲2	ENF
2019	Harald Vilimsky	650,114	17.20 (#3)	3 / 18	▼1	ID
2024	Harald Vilimsky	872,304	25.73 (**#1**)	6 / 20	▲3	PfE

=== State parliaments ===
States in which the FPÖ is involved in the state government as a senior coalition partner (Dark Blue). States in which the FPÖ is involved in the state government as a junior coalition partner (Blue). States in which the FPÖ is represented in the state parliament as an opposition party (Light Blue).

State	Year	Votes	%	Seats	±	Government
Burgenland	2025	45,110	23.1 (#2)	9 / 36	▲5	Opposition
Carinthia	2023	74,329	24.5 (#2)	9 / 36	0	Opposition
Lower Austria	2023	217,511	24.2 (#2)	14 / 56	▲6	ÖVP–FPÖ
Salzburg	2023	69,310	25.7 (#2)	10 / 36	▲3	ÖVP–FPÖ
Styria	2024	230,282	34.8 (#1)	17 / 48	▲9	FPÖ–ÖVP
Tyrol	2022	64,683	18.8 (#2)	7 / 36	▲2	Opposition
Upper Austria	2021	159,692	19.8 (#2)	11 / 56	▼7	ÖVP–FPÖ
Vienna	2025	135,160	20.7 (#2)	22 / 100	▲14	Opposition
Vorarlberg	2024	50,151	28.2 (#2)	11 / 36	▲6	ÖVP–FPÖ

=== Results timeline ===
Party	Year	(Austria) Pres.	(Austria) NR	(European Union) EU	(Burgenland) Bgld	(Carinthia) Ktn	(Lower Austria) NÖ	(Salzburg (state)) Sbg	(Styria) Stmk	(Tyrol (federal state)) Tyrol	(Upper Austria) OÖ	(Vienna) Wien	(Vorarlberg) Vbg
VdU	1949	N/A	11.7	N/A	3.9	20.6	4.4	18.5	14.5	17.4	20.8	6.8	22.1
VdU	1950	N/A	11.7	N/A	3.9	Proporz	4.4	Proporz	Proporz	Proporz	Proporz	6.8	
VdU	1951	15.4 (R1)	11.7	N/A	3.9	Proporz	4.4	Proporz	Proporz	Proporz	Proporz	6.8	
VdU	1952	W	11.7	N/A	3.9	Proporz	4.4	Proporz	Proporz	Proporz	Proporz	6.8	
VdU	1953	W	▼11.0	N/A	▼3.6	▼16.9	4.4	Proporz	▼13.6	▼13.3	Proporz	6.8	
VdU	1954	W	▼11.0	N/A	▼3.6	Proporz	▼2.6	▼13.2	Proporz	Proporz	Proporz	▼4.6	▼13.7
VdU	1955	W	▼11.0	N/A	▼3.6	Proporz	▼2.6	Proporz	Proporz	Proporz	▼9.6	▼4.6	
FPÖ	1956	W	▼6.5	N/A	▼2.9	▼15.7	▼2.6	Proporz	Proporz	Proporz	▼9.6	▼4.6	
FPÖ	1957	▲**48.9 (R1)** (Note: Joint candidate with the ÖVP)	▼6.5	N/A	▼2.9	Proporz	▼2.6	Proporz	▼6.8	▼8.5	▼9.6	▼4.6	
FPÖ	1958		▼6.5	N/A	▼2.9	Proporz	▼2.6	Proporz	▼6.8	▼8.5	▼9.6	▼4.6	
FPÖ	1959		▲7.7	N/A	▼2.9	Proporz	▲3.9	▲16.1	▼6.8	▼8.5	▼9.6	▲8.0	▲14.9
FPÖ	1960		▲7.7	N/A	▲4.6	▲14.9	▲3.9	Proporz	▼6.8	▼8.5	▼9.6	▲8.0	
FPÖ	1961		▲7.7	N/A	▲4.6	Proporz	▲3.9	Proporz	▲7.2	▲9.1	▲9.7	▲8.0	
FPÖ	1962		▼7.0	N/A	▲4.6	Proporz	▲3.9	Proporz	▲7.2	▲9.1	▲9.7	▲8.0	
FPÖ	1963	Did not stand	▼7.0	N/A	▲4.6	Proporz	▲3.9	Proporz	▲7.2	▲9.1	▲9.7	▲8.0	
FPÖ	1964	Did not stand	▼7.0	N/A	▼3.6	Proporz	▼3.0	▼11.8	▲7.2	▲9.1	▲9.7	▼5.7	▲15.8
FPÖ	1965	Did not stand	▼7.0	N/A	▼3.6	▼13.4	▼3.0	Proporz	▼5.8	▼6.0	▲9.7	▼5.7	
FPÖ	1966	Did not stand	▼5.4	N/A	▼3.6	Proporz	▼3.0	Proporz	▼5.8	▼6.0	▲9.7	▼5.7	
FPÖ	1967	Did not stand	▼5.4	N/A	▼3.6	Proporz	▼3.0	Proporz	▼5.8	▼6.0	▼7.5	▼5.7	
FPÖ	1968	Did not stand	▼5.4	N/A	▼2.2	Proporz	▼3.0	Proporz	▼5.8	▼6.0	▼7.5	▼5.7	
FPÖ	1969	Did not stand	▼5.4	N/A	▼2.2	Proporz	▲3.2	▲18.0	▼5.8	▼6.0	▼7.5	▼7.2	▲21.0
FPÖ	1970	Did not stand	▲5.5	N/A	▼2.2	▼12.1	▲3.2	Proporz	▼5.3	▼5.7	▼7.5	▼7.2	
FPÖ	1971	Did not stand	▲6.3	N/A	▼2.2	▼12.1	▲3.2	Proporz	▼5.3	▼5.7	▼7.5	▼7.2	
FPÖ	1972	Did not stand	▲6.3	N/A	▲3.0	▼12.1	▲3.2	Proporz	▼5.3	▼5.7	▼7.5	▼7.2	
FPÖ	1973	Did not stand	▲6.3	N/A	▲3.0	▼12.1	▲3.2	Proporz	▼5.3	▼5.7	▲7.7	▲7.7	
FPÖ	1974	Did not stand	▲6.3	N/A	▲3.0	▼12.1	▼3.0	▼15.5	▼4.2	▼5.7	▲7.7	▲7.7	▼13.9
FPÖ	1975	Did not stand	▼5.4	N/A	▲3.0	▼11.8	▼3.0	Proporz	▼4.2	▲5.9	▲7.7	▲7.7	
FPÖ	1976	Did not stand	▼5.4	N/A	▲3.0	▼11.8	▼3.0	Proporz	▼4.2	▲5.9	▲7.7	▲7.7	
FPÖ	1977	Did not stand	▼5.4	N/A	▼2.3	▼11.8	▼3.0	Proporz	▼4.2	▲5.9	▲7.7	▲7.7	
FPÖ	1978	Did not stand	▼5.4	N/A	▼2.3	▼11.8	▼3.0	Proporz	▲6.4	▲5.9	▲7.7	▼6.5	
FPÖ	1979	Did not stand	▲6.1	N/A	▼2.3	▼11.7	▲3.2	▼13.3	▲6.4	▲6.8	▼6.4	▼6.5	▼12.5
FPÖ	1980	▼17.0 (R1)	▲6.1	N/A	▼2.3	▼11.7	▲3.2	Proporz	▲6.4	▲6.8	▼6.4	▼6.5	
FPÖ	1981		▲6.1	N/A	▼2.3	▼11.7	▲3.2	Proporz	▼5.1	▲6.8	▼6.4	▼6.5	
FPÖ	1982		▲6.1	N/A	▲2.9	▼11.7	▲3.2	Proporz	▼5.1	▲6.8	▼6.4	▼6.5	
FPÖ	1983		▼5.0	N/A	▲2.9	▼11.7	▼1.7	Proporz	▼5.1	▲6.8	▼6.4	▼5.4	
FPÖ	1984			N/A	▲2.9	▲16.0	▼1.7	▼8.7	▼5.1	▼6.0	▼6.4	▼5.4	▼10.5
FPÖ	1985			N/A	▲2.9	Proporz	▼1.7	▼8.7	▼5.1	▼6.0	▼5.0	▼5.4	
FPÖ	1986	▼1.2 (R1)	▲9.7	N/A	▲2.9	Proporz	▼1.7	▼8.7	▼4.6	▼6.0	▼5.0	▼5.4	
FPÖ	1987	W	▲9.7	N/A	▲7.3	Proporz	▼1.7	▼8.7	▼4.6	▼6.0	▼5.0	▲9.7	
FPÖ	1988	W	▲9.7	N/A	▲7.3	Proporz	▲9.4	▼8.7	▼4.6	▼6.0	▼5.0	▲9.7	
FPÖ	1989	W	▲9.7	N/A	▲7.3	▲29.0	▲9.4	▲16.4	▼4.6	▲15.6	▼5.0	▲9.7	▲16.1
FPÖ	1990	W	▲16.6	N/A	▲7.3	▲29.0	▲9.4	Proporz	▼4.6	Proporz	▼5.0	▲9.7	
FPÖ	1991	W	▲16.6	N/A	▲9.7	Proporz	▲9.4	Proporz	▲15.4	Proporz	▲17.7	▲22.5	
FPÖ	1992	▲16.4 (R1)	▲16.6	N/A	▲9.7	Proporz	▲9.4	Proporz	Proporz	Proporz	Proporz	▲22.5	
FPÖ	1993	W	▲16.6	N/A	▲9.7	Proporz	▲12.0	Proporz	Proporz	Proporz	Proporz	▲22.5	
FPÖ	1994	W	▲22.5	N/A	▲9.7	▲33.3	Proporz	▲19.5	Proporz	▲16.1	Proporz	▲22.5	▲18.4
FPÖ	1995	W	▼21.9	N/A	▲9.7	Proporz	Proporz	Proporz	▲17.1	Proporz	Proporz	▲22.5	
FPÖ	1996	W	▼21.9	**27.5**	▲14.6	Proporz	Proporz	Proporz	Proporz	Proporz	Proporz	▲27.9	
FPÖ	1997	W	▼21.9	**27.5**	Proporz	Proporz	Proporz	Proporz	Proporz	Proporz	▲20.6	▲27.9	
FPÖ	1998	Did not stand	▼21.9	**27.5**	Proporz	Proporz	▲16.1	Proporz	Proporz	Proporz	Proporz	▲27.9	
FPÖ	1999	Did not stand	▲26.9	▼23.4	Proporz	▲42.1	Proporz	▲19.6	Proporz	▲**19.6**	Proporz	▲27.9	▲27.4
FPÖ	2000	Did not stand		▼23.4	▼12.6	▲42.1	Proporz	▲19.6	▼12.4	▲**19.6**	Proporz	▲27.9	
FPÖ	2001	Did not stand		▼23.4	▼12.6	▲42.1	Proporz	▲19.6	Proporz	▲**19.6**	Proporz	▼20.2	
FPÖ	2002	Did not stand	▼10.0	▼23.4	▼12.6	▲42.1	Proporz	▲19.6	Proporz	▲**19.6**	Proporz	▼20.2	
FPÖ	2003	Did not stand		▼23.4	▼12.6	▲42.1	▼4.5	▲19.6	Proporz	▼8.0	▼8.4	▼20.2	
FPÖ	2004	Did not stand		▼6.3	▼12.6	▲**42.4**	▼4.5	▼8.7	Proporz	▼8.0	▼8.4	▼20.2	▼12.9
FPÖ	2005	Did not stand		▼6.3	▼5.8	▲**42.4**	▼4.5	▼8.7	▼4.6	▼8.0	▼8.4	▼14.8	
FPÖ	2006	Did not stand	▲11.0	▼6.3	▼5.8		▼4.5	▼8.7	▼4.6	▼8.0	▼8.4	▼14.8	
FPÖ	2007	Did not stand	▲11.0	▼6.3	▼5.8		▼4.5	▼8.7	▼4.6	▼8.0	▼8.4	▼14.8	
FPÖ	2008	Did not stand	▲17.5	▼6.3	▼5.8		▲10.5	▼8.7	▼4.6	▲12.4	▼8.4	▼14.8	
FPÖ	2009	Did not stand	▲17.5	▲12.7	▼5.8	▼3.7	Proporz	▲13.0	▼4.6	▲12.4	▲15.3	▼14.8	▲25.1
FPÖ	2010	▼15.2 (R1)	▲17.5	▲12.7	▲9.0	▼3.7	Proporz	▲13.0	▲10.7	▲12.4	Proporz	▲25.8	▲25.1
FPÖ	2011		▲17.5	▲12.7	▲9.0	▼3.7	Proporz	▲13.0	Proporz	▲12.4	Proporz	▲25.8	▲25.1
FPÖ	2012		▲17.5	▲12.7	▲9.0	▼3.7	Proporz	▲13.0	Proporz	▲12.4	Proporz	▲25.8	▲25.1
FPÖ	2013		▲20.5	▲12.7	▲9.0	▲16.9	▼8.2	▲17.0	Proporz	▼9.3	Proporz	▲25.8	▲25.1
FPÖ	2014		▲20.5	▲19.7	▲9.0	Proporz	▼8.2	▲17.0	Proporz	▼9.3	Proporz	▲25.8	▼23.4
FPÖ	2015		▲20.5	▲19.7	▲15.0	Proporz	▼8.2	▲17.0	▲26.8	▼9.3	▲**30.4**	▲**30.8**	▼23.4
FPÖ	2016	▲35.1 (R1) ▲ ~~**49.6 (R2)**~~ ▲46.2 (R2)	▲20.5	▲19.7		Proporz	▼8.2	▲17.0	▲26.8	▼9.3		▲**30.8**	▼23.4
FPÖ	2017	W	▲26.0	▲19.7		Proporz	▼8.2	▲17.0	▲26.8	▼9.3		▲**30.8**	▼23.4
FPÖ	2018	W		▲19.7		▲23.0	▲14.8	▲18.8	▲26.8	▲15.5		▲**30.8**	▼23.4
FPÖ	2019	W	▼16.2	▼17.2		▲23.0	Proporz	▲18.8	▼17.5	▲15.5		▲**30.8**	▼13.9
FPÖ	2020	W	▼16.2	▼17.2	▼9.8	▲23.0	Proporz	▲18.8	▼17.5	▲15.5		▼7.1	▼13.9
FPÖ	2021	W	▼16.2	▼17.2	▼9.8	▲23.0	Proporz	▲18.8	▼17.5	▲15.5	▼19.8	▼7.1	▼13.9
FPÖ	2022	▼17.7 (R1)	▼16.2	▼17.2	▼9.8	▲23.0	Proporz	▲18.8	▼17.5	▲18.8		▼7.1	▼13.9
FPÖ	2023		▼16.2	▼17.2	▼9.8	▲24.5	▲**24.2**	▲**25.7**	▼17.5	▲18.8		▼7.1	▼13.9
FPÖ	2024		▲**28.8**	▲25.4	▼9.8	▲24.5			▲**34.5**	▲18.8		▼7.1	▲**28.0**
FPÖ	2025		▲**28.8**	▲25.4	▲**23.1**	▲24.5				▲18.8		▲20.4	
Party	Year	(Austria) Pres.	(Austria) NR	(European Union) EU	(Burgenland) Bgld	(Carinthia) Ktn	(Lower Austria) NÖ	(Salzburg (state)) Sbg	(Styria) Stmk	(Tyrol (federal state)) Tyrol	(Upper Austria) OÖ	(Vienna) Wien	(Vorarlberg) Vbg
**Bold** indicates best result to date. Present in legislature (in opposition) / Present in presidential first round Junior coalition partner / Present in presidential second round Senior coalition partner / Presidential winner

== See also ==
- Gaston Glock

== Works cited ==
- Campbell, David F. J. (1995). "Jörg Haider (1950– )". In Wilsford, David (ed.). Political leaders of contemporary Western Europe: a biographical dictionary. Greenwood Publishing Group. pp. 183–88. ISBN 978-0-313-28623-0.
- Fillitz, Thomas (2006). "'Being the Native's Friend Does Not Make You The Foreigners Enemy!' Neo-nationalism, the Freedom Party and Jörg Haider in Austria". In Gingrich, André; Banks, Marcus (eds.). Neo-nationalism in Europe and beyond: perspectives from social anthropology. Berghahn Books. pp. 138–61. ISBN 1-84545-190-2.
- Meret, Susi (2010). The Danish People's Party, the Italian Northern League and the Austrian Freedom Party in a Comparative Perspective: Party Ideology and Electoral Support (PDF). SPIRIT PhD Series. Vol. 25. University of Aalborg. ISSN 1903-7783. Archived from the original (PhD thesis) on 22 July 2011.
- Riedlsperger, Max (1998). "The Freedom Party of Austria: From Protest to Radical Right Populism". In Betz, Hans-Georg; Immerfall, Stefan (eds.). The new politics of the Right: neo-Populist parties and movements in established democracies. Palgrave Macmillan. pp. 27–43. ISBN 978-0-312-21338-1.
- Pelinka, Anton (2005). "Right-Wing Populism Plus "X": The Austrian Freedom Party (FPÖ)". Challenges to Consensual Politics: Democracy, Identity, and Populist Protest in the Alpine Region. Brussels: P.I.E.-Peter Lang. pp. 131–146.
