= Alexander Götz =

Austrian politician (1928–2018)

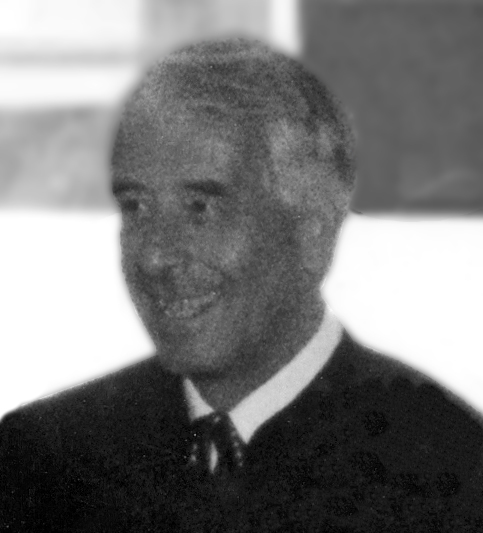
- Götz in ca. 1987

Mayor of Graz
- In office 24 April 1973 – 21 March 1983
- Preceded by: Gustav Scherbaum
- Succeeded by: Franz Hasiba

Chair of the Freedom Party
- In office 1978–1980
- Preceded by: Friedrich Peter
- Succeeded by: Norbert Steger

Personal details
- Born: 27 February 1928 Graz, Austria
- Died: 18 January 2018 (aged 89) Graz
- Party: Freedom Party of Austria

Alexander Götz (27 February 1928 – 18 January 2018) was an Austrian politician. He was chairman of the Freedom Party of Austria (FPÖ) from 1978 to 1980 and mayor of Graz from 1973 to 1983.

== Life ==
Born in Graz in 1928 to Alexander Götz Sr., the founder of the FPÖ Steiermark, Götz studied civil engineering at Graz University of Technology before earning a doctorate in law in 1956 and a further doctorate in political science in 1958.

He joined the newly formed FPÖ in 1955 and was elected city councillor in 1958. He served as deputy mayor of the city from 1964 to 1973 and as a member of the Styrian Parliament from 1965 to 1974. He led the FPÖ Steiermark from 1964 to 1983.

He led the national FPÖ from 1978 to 1980, receiving 6% of the vote in the 1979 legislative election. Under his leadership, the FPÖ joined the Liberal International in 1978. In 1980, he was replaced as party chair by Norbert Steger.

In the 2017 Graz council election, he stood as a candidate for the FPÖ in 96th place on the party list.

Friedrich Peter	FPÖ Party Chairman; 1978–1980	Norbert Steger
