= Franz Koch (writer) =

Franz Koch (Attnang, Oberösterreich 21 March 1888 - Tübingen 29 December 1969) was a German literary historian and scholar of Goethe and Schiller. He was compromised by his association with National Socialism.
