= Josef Taus =

Austrian industrialist and politician (1933–2024)

Josef Taus (6 February 1933 – 14 December 2024) was an Austrian industrialist and politician who served in the National Council. Born on 6 February 1933, he died on 14 December 2024, at the age of 91.
