= List of presidents of Austria =

This is a list of presidents of Austria since the establishment of that office in 1919.

== List of officeholders (1920–present) ==
=== Presidents of Austria during the Interwar period ===
Portrait	Bundespräsident	Took office	Left office	Time in office	Party	Election
Karl Seitz	Karl Seitz (1869–1950) (Note: De facto head of state, as President of the National Council.)	10 November 1920	9 December 1920	29 days	SDAPÖ	1919
Michael Hainisch	Michael Hainisch (1858–1940)	9 December 1920	10 December 1928	8 years, 1 day	Independent	1920; 1924
Wilhelm Miklas	Wilhelm Miklas (1872–1956)	10 December 1928	13 March 1938	9 years, 93 days	CS; VF	1928; 1934

Austria was part of Nazi Germany from 12 March 1938 to 13 April 1945.

=== Presidents of Austria after the end of World War II ===
† denotes people who died in office.

Portrait	Bundespräsident	Took office	Left office	Time in office	Party	Election
Karl Renner	Karl Renner (1870–1950)	20 December 1945	31 December 1950 †	5 years, 11 days	SPÖ	1945
Leopold Figl	Leopold Figl (1902–1965); Acting (Note: Acting President, as Chancellor of Austria.)	31 December 1950	21 June 1951	172 days	ÖVP	–
Theodor Körner	Theodor Körner (1873–1957)	21 June 1951	4 January 1957 †	5 years, 197 days	SPÖ	1951
Julius Raab	Julius Raab (1891–1964); Acting	4 January 1957	22 May 1957	138 days	ÖVP	–
Adolf Schärf	Adolf Schärf (1890–1965)	22 May 1957	28 February 1965 †	7 years, 282 days	SPÖ	1957; 1963
Josef Klaus	Josef Klaus (1910–2001); Acting	28 February 1965	9 June 1965	101 days	ÖVP	–
Franz Jonas	Franz Jonas (1899–1974)	9 June 1965	24 April 1974 †	8 years, 319 days	SPÖ	1965; 1971
Bruno Kreisky	Bruno Kreisky (1911–1990); Acting	24 April 1974	8 July 1974	75 days	SPÖ	–
Rudolf Kirchschläger	Rudolf Kirchschläger (1915–2000)	8 July 1974	8 July 1986	12 years	Independent	1974; 1980
Kurt Waldheim	Kurt Waldheim (1918–2007)	8 July 1986	8 July 1992	6 years	ÖVP	1986
Thomas Klestil	Thomas Klestil (1932–2004)	8 July 1992	6 July 2004 †	11 years, 364 days	ÖVP	1992; 1998
Andreas Khol	Andreas Khol (born 1941); Acting (Note: Interim college officeholder, as President of the National Council.)	6 July 2004	8 July 2004	2 days	ÖVP	–
Barbara Prammer	Barbara Prammer (1954–2014); Acting (Note: Interim college officeholder, as Second President of the National Council.)	6 July 2004	8 July 2004	2 days	SPÖ	–
Thomas Prinzhorn	Thomas Prinzhorn (born 1943); Acting (Note: Interim college officeholder, as Third President of the National Council.)	6 July 2004	8 July 2004	2 days	FPÖ	–
Heinz Fischer	Heinz Fischer (born 1938)	8 July 2004	8 July 2016	12 years	SPÖ	2004; 2010
Doris Bures	Doris Bures (born 1962); Acting	8 July 2016	26 January 2017	202 days	SPÖ	–
Karlheinz Kopf	Karlheinz Kopf (born 1957); Acting	8 July 2016	26 January 2017	202 days	ÖVP	–
Norbert Hofer	Norbert Hofer (born 1971); Acting	8 July 2016	26 January 2017	202 days	FPÖ	–
Alexander Van der Bellen	Alexander Van der Bellen (born 1944)	26 January 2017	Incumbent	9 years, 281 days	Greens	2016; 2022

== Longest-serving presidents ==
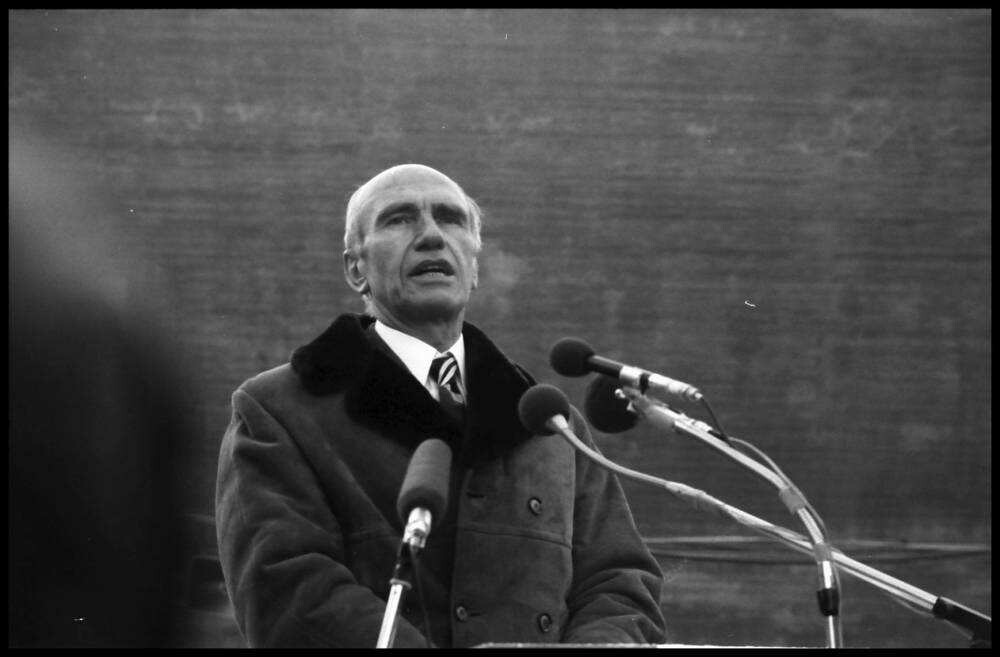
Rudolf Kirchschläger, longest-serving president (12 years, tied) & first to complete two full terms

The following table lists all presidents of the Second Republic (since 1945) ranked by their length of tenure, with the incumbent president's tenure automatically updating daily.

Rank	President	Length of tenure	Timespan	Party
1	Heinz Fischer	12 years, 0 days	2004–2016	SPÖ
1	Rudolf Kirchschläger	12 years, 0 days	1974–1986	IND
3	Thomas Klestil	11 years, 364 days	1992–2004	ÖVP
4	Alexander Van der Bellen	9 years, 281 days	2017–present	Greens
5	Franz Jonas	8 years, 319 days	1965–1974	SPÖ
6	Adolf Schärf	7 years, 282 days	1957–1965	SPÖ
7	Kurt Waldheim	6 years, 0 days	1986–1992	ÖVP
8	Theodor Körner	5 years, 197 days	1951–1957	SPÖ
9	Karl Renner	5 years, 11 days	1945–1950	SPÖ

== Presidents by party ==
The following table summarizes presidents of the Second Republic grouped by political party.

Party	Total time in office	Number of presidents	Presidents
SPÖ; Social Democratic Party	39 years, 80 days	5	Karl Renner, Theodor Körner, Adolf Schärf, Franz Jonas, Heinz Fischer
ÖVP; Austrian People's Party	17 years, 364 days	2	Kurt Waldheim, Thomas Klestil
IND; Independent	12 years, 0 days	1	Rudolf Kirchschläger
Greens; The Greens	9 years, 281 days (ongoing)	1	Alexander Van der Bellen

== Age-related statistics ==
The following table shows age-related data for all presidents of the Second Republic, with living presidents' ages automatically updating.

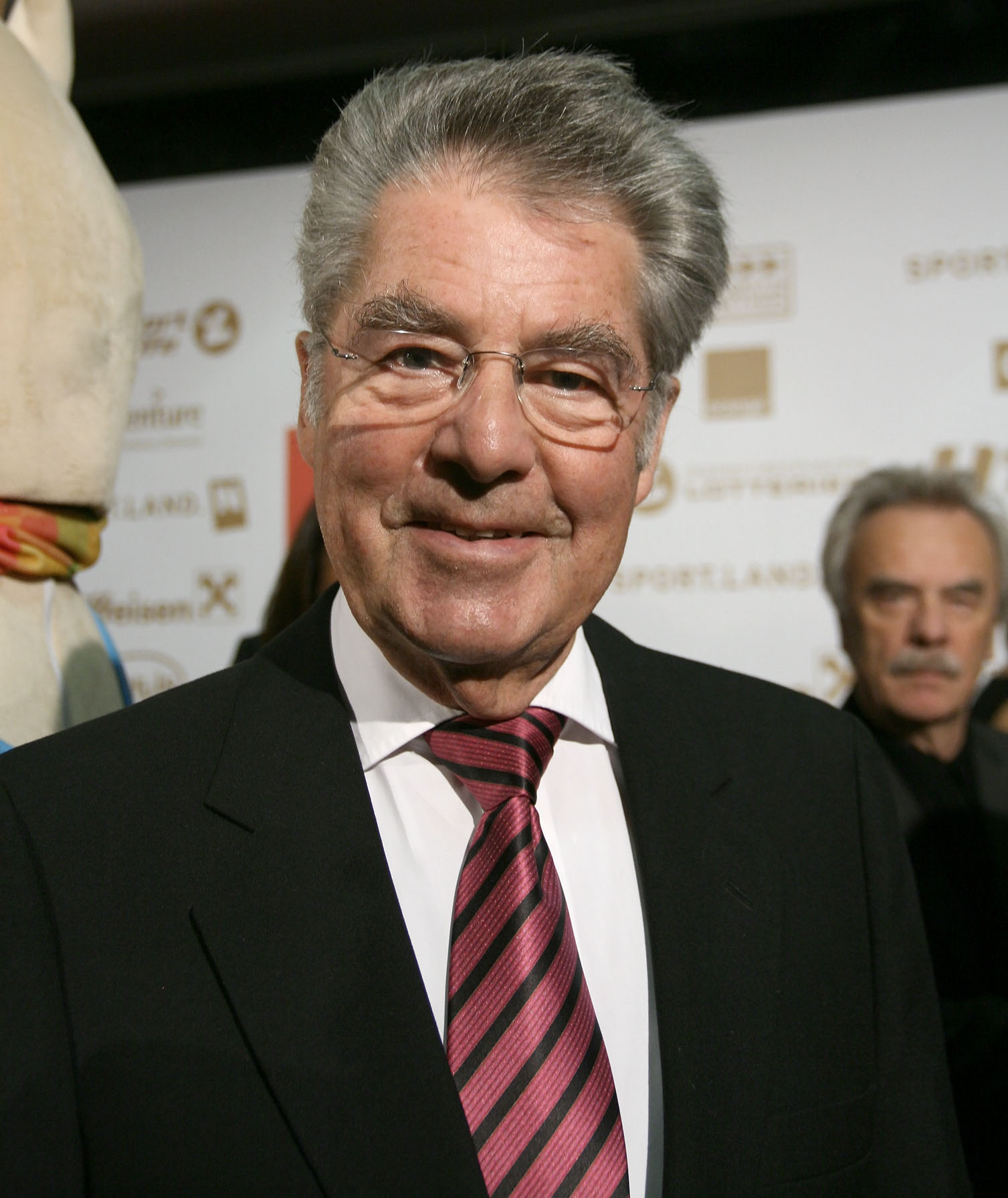
Heinz Fischer, longest-serving president (12 years, tied) & currently the only living former president

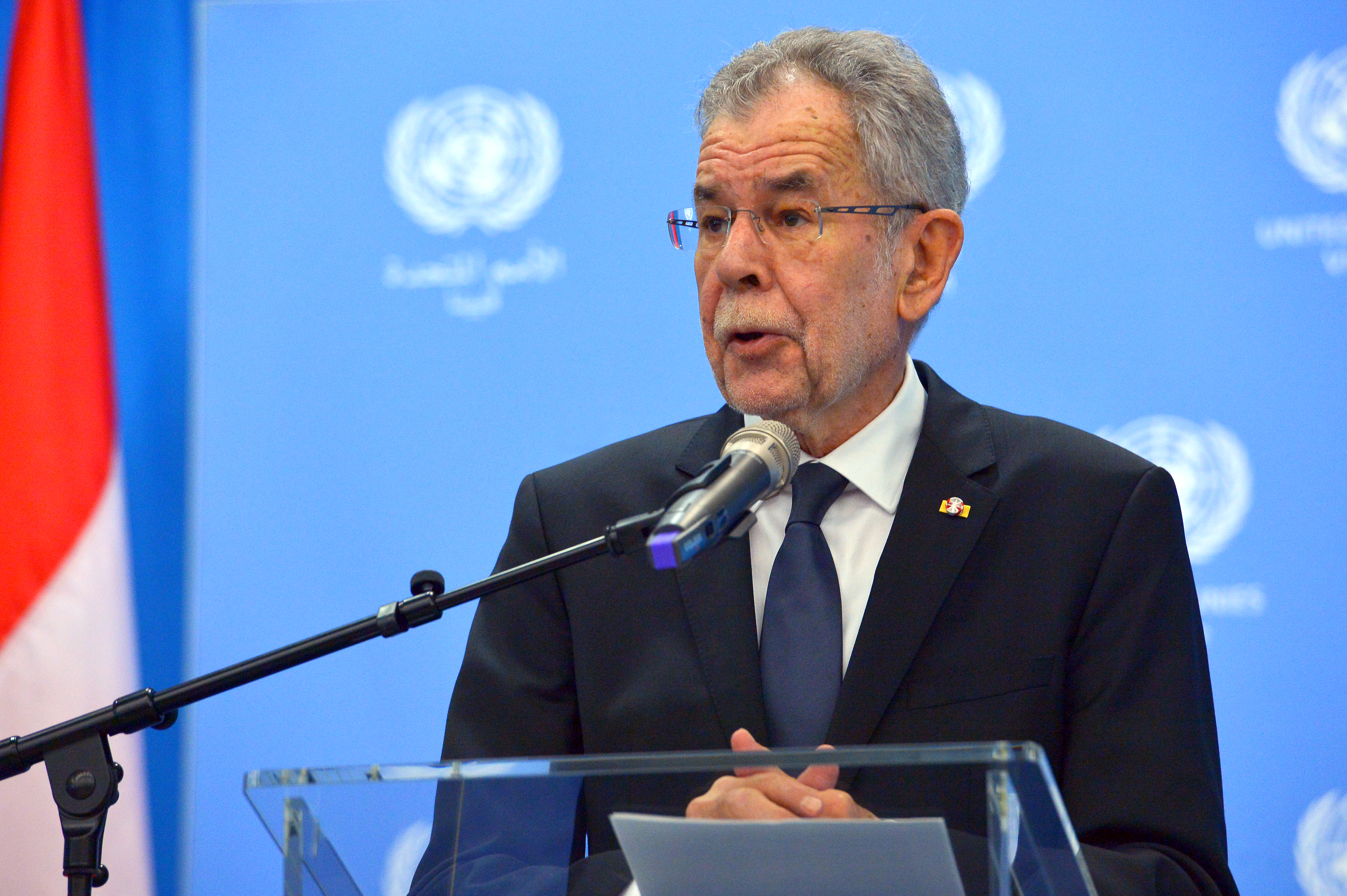
Alexander Van der Bellen, current president

President	Born	Age at start of presidency	Age at end of presidency	Post-presidency timespan	Died	Lifespan
Karl Renner	14 December 1870	75 years, 6 days 20 December 1945	80 years, 17 days 31 December 1950	—	31 December 1950	80 years, 17 days
Theodor Körner	24 April 1873	78 years, 58 days 21 June 1951	83 years, 255 days 4 January 1957	—	4 January 1957	83 years, 255 days
Adolf Schärf	20 April 1890	67 years, 32 days 22 May 1957	74 years, 314 days 28 February 1965	—	28 February 1965	74 years, 314 days
Franz Jonas	4 October 1899	65 years, 248 days 9 June 1965	74 years, 202 days 24 April 1974	—	24 April 1974	74 years, 202 days
Rudolf Kirchschläger	20 March 1915	59 years, 110 days 8 July 1974	71 years, 110 days 8 July 1986	13 years, 266 days	30 March 2000	85 years, 10 days
Kurt Waldheim	21 December 1918	67 years, 199 days 8 July 1986	73 years, 200 days 8 July 1992	14 years, 341 days	14 June 2007	88 years, 175 days
Thomas Klestil	4 November 1932	59 years, 247 days 8 July 1992	71 years, 245 days 6 July 2004	—	6 July 2004	71 years, 245 days
Heinz Fischer	9 October 1938	65 years, 273 days 8 July 2004	77 years, 273 days 8 July 2016	10 years, 118 days	—	88 years, 25 days
Alexander Van der Bellen	18 January 1944	73 years, 8 days 26 January 2017	Incumbent			82 years, 289 days

Notes:

- Light green indicates living former presidents
- Green indicates the current incumbent president
- Presidents who died in office show "—" for post-presidency timespan
- Living presidents' post-presidency timespan and lifespan automatically update daily

== Graphical representation ==
This is a graphical lifespan timeline of the Presidents of Austria since 1945. They are listed in order of first assuming office.

The following chart shows presidents by their age (living presidents in green), with the years of their time in office in color.

== See also ==
- History of Austria
- Politics of Austria
- Emperor of Austria
  - Rulers of Austria
- President of Austria
- Chancellor of Austria
  - List of chancellors of Austria
