= Alfons Gorbach =

Chancellor of Austria from 1961 to 1964

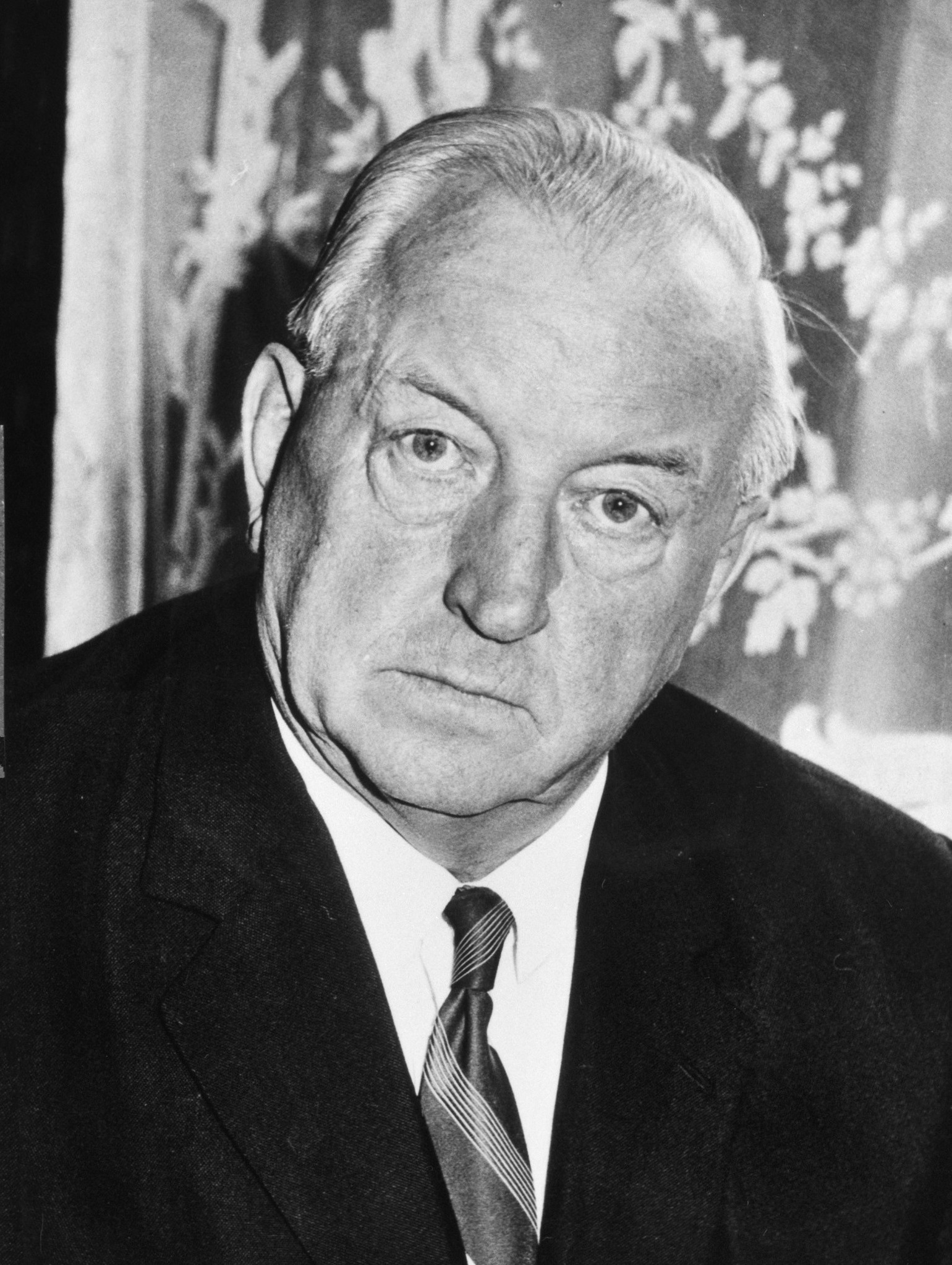
- Gorbach in 1965

Chancellor of Austria
- In office 11 April 1961 – 2 April 1964
- President: Adolf Schärf
- Vice-Chancellor: Bruno Pittermann
- Preceded by: Julius Raab
- Succeeded by: Josef Klaus

Third President of the National Council
- In office 8 June 1956 – 11 April 1961
- Preceded by: Karl Hartleb
- Succeeded by: Alfred Maleta
- In office 19 December 1945 – 18 March 1953
- Preceded by: Sepp Straffner (1933)
- Succeeded by: Karl Hartleb

Personal details
- Born: 2 September 1898; Imst, Tyrol, Austria-Hungary
- Died: 31 July 1972 (aged 73); Graz, Styria, Austria
- Political party: People's Party

Alfons Gorbach (2 September 1898 – 31 July 1972) was an Austrian politician of the conservative People's Party (ÖVP). He served as Chancellor of Austria from 1961 to 1964.

== Life ==
Born in Imst, Tyrol, Gorbach served in the Austro-Hungarian Army at the Italian Front in World War I, was severely wounded in the 1917 Battle of Caporetto and lost a leg. After the war he took up a political career in the First Austrian Republic. He joined the Christian Social Party and from 1929 to 1932 was a municipal councillor in Graz, Styria. In 1937 he was appointed a minister (Landesrat) in the Styrian state government, However, upon the Austrian Anschluss to Nazi Germany in March 1938, Gorbach was dismissed and held as a political prisoner at Dachau concentration camp from 1938 to 1942, and again at Flossenburg from 1944 until the end of World War II.

After the war, Gorbach joined the newly established Austrian People's Party, and upon the 1945 legislative election became third president of the National Council parliament, an office he held until 1953 and again from 1956 to 1961. When a deceiving outcome in the 1959 election launched an internal party debate over aging ÖVP Chancellor Julius Raab, Gorbach, backed by the Styrian regional association, succeeded him as party chairman and on 11 April 1961 also as Austrian chancellor.

Chancellor Gorbach led his party into the 1962 election with an anti-Socialist campaign, only to continue the grand coalition with the SPÖ under Vice-Chancellor Bruno Pittermann afterwards. The People's Party achieved a slightly better result and became the strongest party five seats ahead of the Socialists, however, it failed to reach an absolute majority. After three years as chancellor, conciliatory Gorbach had to vacate his position in favour of the less pragmatic ÖVP "reformers" around his successor Josef Klaus. He returned to the National Council where he kept his mandate until 1970. In 1965 he unsuccessfully ran against Franz Jonas in the Austrian presidential election.

Gorbach remained honorary chairman of the Austrian People's Party. He died in Graz, Styria, aged 73.

Political offices
Preceded by Julius Raab	Chancellor of Austria; 1961 – 1964	Succeeded by Josef Klaus
Party political offices
Preceded by Julius Raab	Chair of the Austrian People's Party; 1960 – 1963	Succeeded by Josef Klaus
