= 1962 Austrian legislative election =

← 1959	18 November 1962	1966 →

165 seats in the National Council of Austria 83 seats needed for a majority
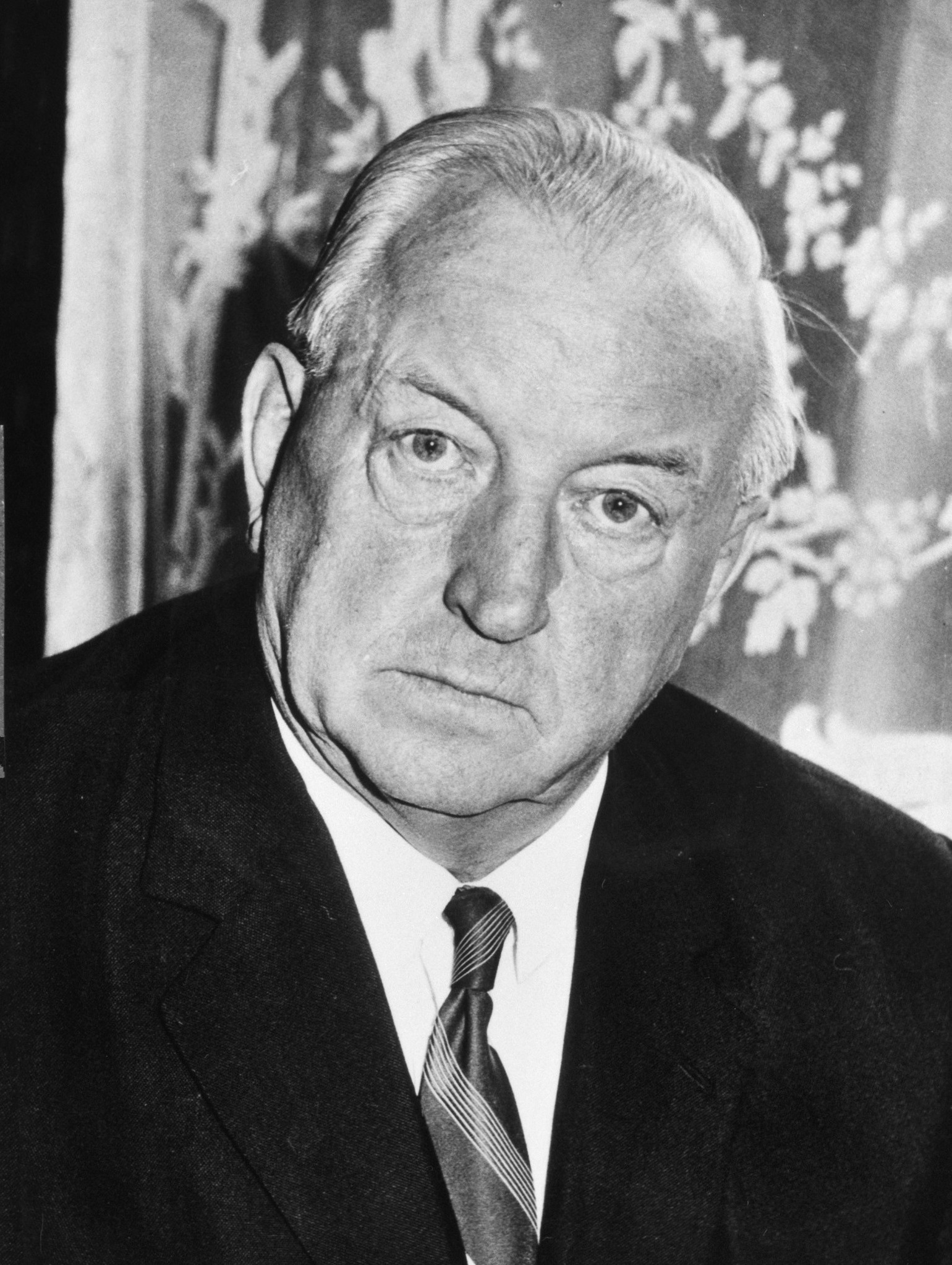

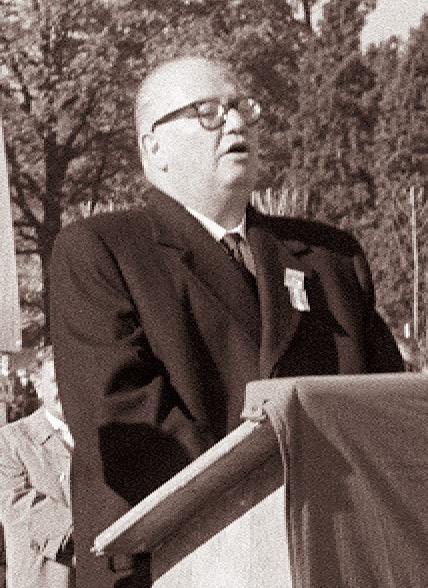

	First party	Second party	Third party
Leader	Alfons Gorbach	Bruno Pittermann	Friedrich Peter
Party	ÖVP	SPÖ	FPÖ
Last election	44.19%, 79 seats	44.79%, 78 seats	7.70%, 8 seats
Seats won	81	76	8
Seat change	▲2	▼2	Steady
Popular vote	2,024,501	1,960,685	313,895
Percentage	45.43%	44.00%	7.04%
Swing	▲1.24 pp	▼0.79 pp	▼0.66 pp
- Results by constituency
Chancellor before election
Alfons Gorbach
ÖVP
Elected Chancellor
Alfons Gorbach
ÖVP

Parliamentary elections were held in Austria on 18 November 1962. The result was a victory for the Austrian People's Party, which won 81 of the 165 seats. Voter turnout was 94%. Although the People's Party had come up only two seats short of an outright majority, Chancellor Alfons Gorbach (who had succeeded Julius Raab a year earlier) retained the grand coalition with the Socialists under Vice-Chancellor Bruno Pittermann.

== Results ==
Party	Votes	%	Seats	+/–
Austrian People's Party	2,024,501	45.43	81	+2
Socialist Party of Austria	1,960,685	44.00	76	–2
Freedom Party of Austria	313,895	7.04	8	0
Communists and Left Socialists	135,520	3.04	0	0
European Federal Party of Austria	21,530	0.48	0	New
Total	4,456,131	100.00	165	0
Valid votes	4,456,131	98.89		
Invalid/blank votes	49,876	1.11		
Total votes	4,506,007	100.00		
Registered voters/turnout	4,805,351	93.77		
Source: Nohlen & Stöver

=== Results by state ===
State	ÖVP	SPÖ	FPÖ	KLS	EFP
Burgenland	48.7	46.3	4.0	1.0	-
Carinthia	34.2	49.7	12.5	3.2	0.4
Lower Austria	52.2	41.7	3.4	2.6	0.1
Upper Austria	48.6	41.3	8.0	1.8	0.2
Salzburg	46.1	38.5	13.7	1.8	-
Styria	46.5	43.2	6.8	3.4	-
Tyrol	61.9	30.0	6.5	1.0	0.6
Vorarlberg	55.9	28.0	14.9	1	-
Vienna	34.5	52.4	6.6	5.0	1.4
Austria	45.4	44.0	7.0	3.0	0.5
Source: Institute for Social Research and Consulting (SORA)
