= 1965 Austrian presidential election =

← 1963	23 May 1965	1971 →
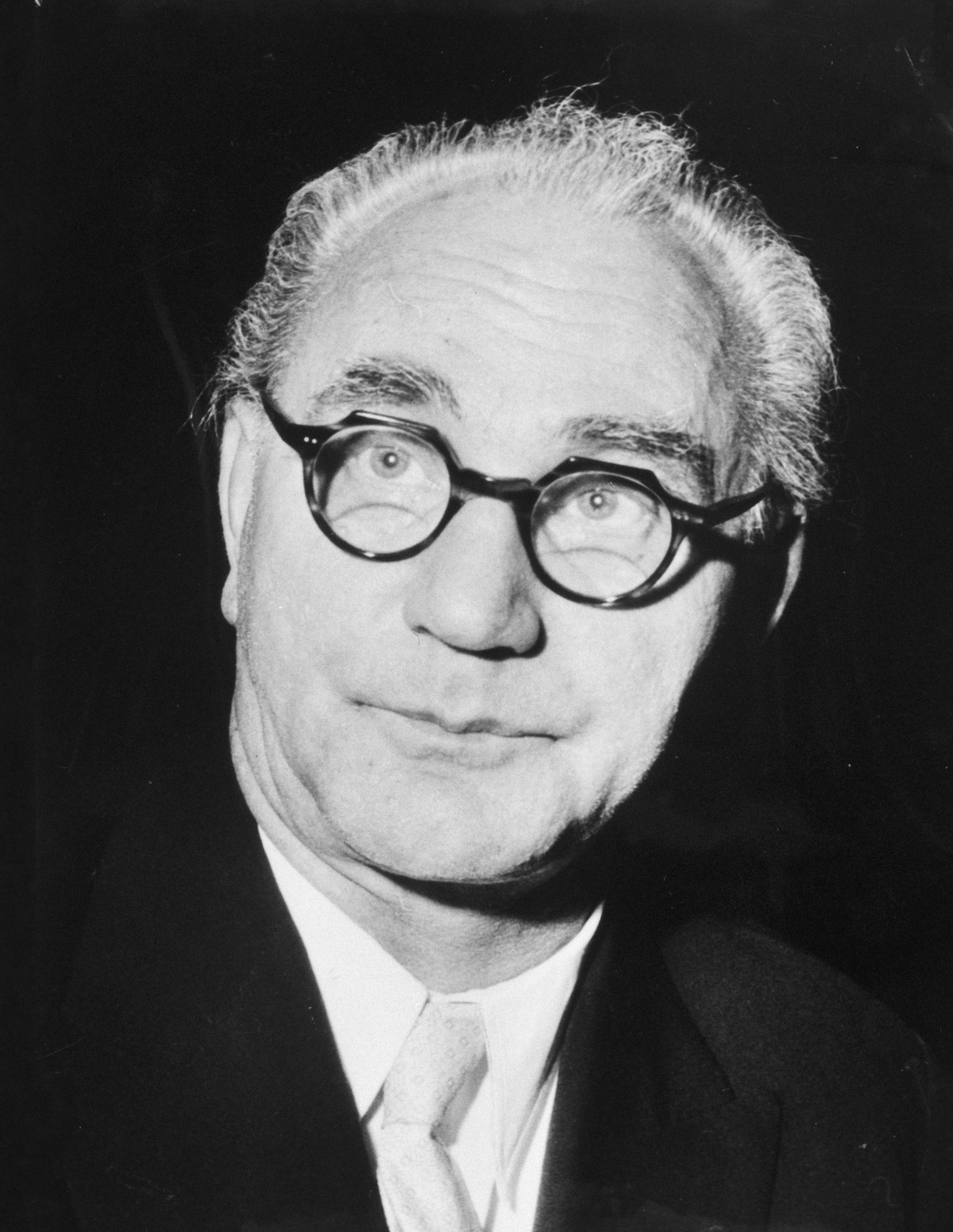

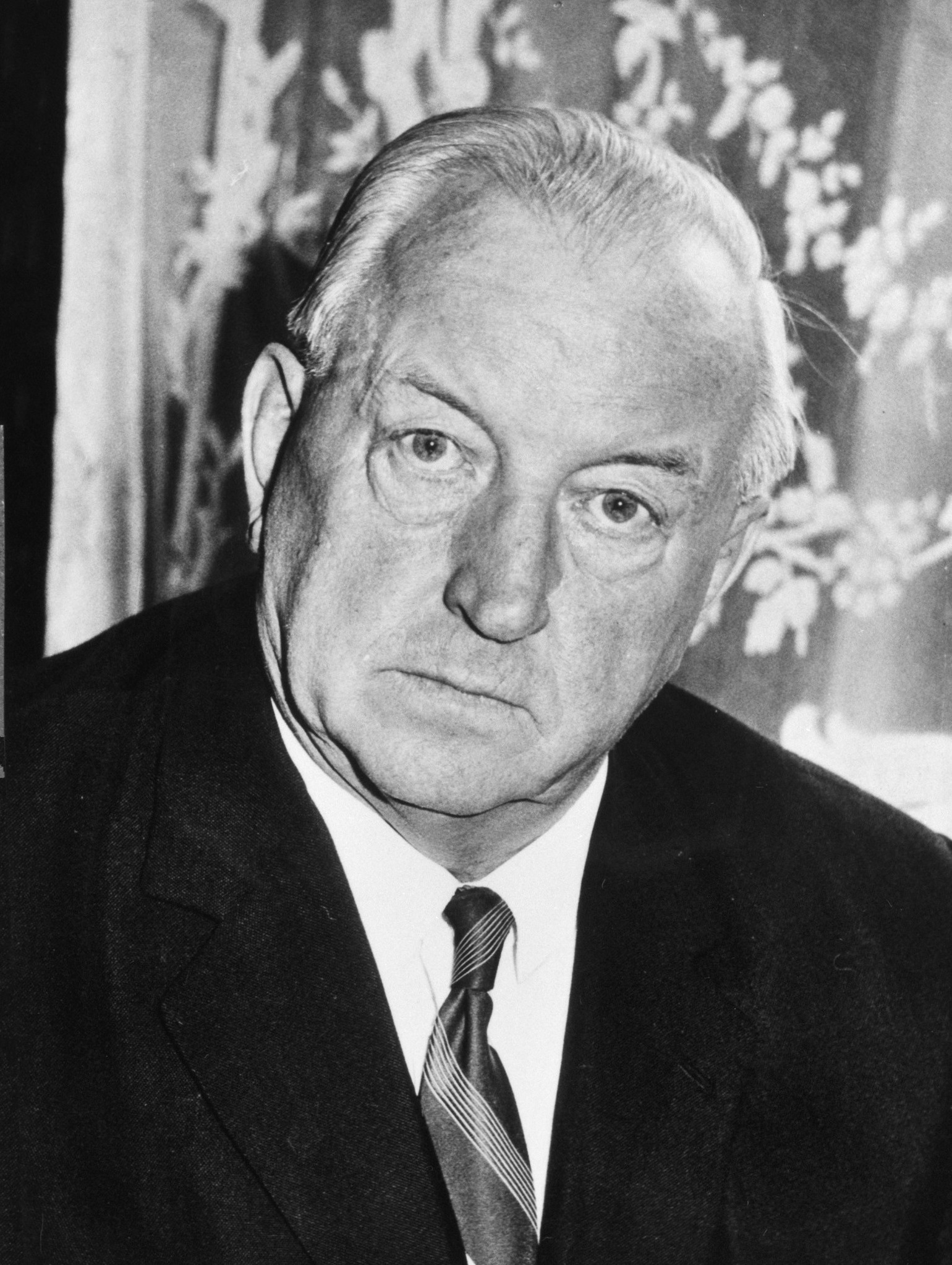
Nominee	Franz Jonas	Alfons Gorbach
Party	SPÖ	ÖVP
Popular vote	2,324,436	2,260,888
Percentage	50.69%	49.31%
President before election
Adolf Schärf
SPÖ
Elected President
Franz Jonas
SPÖ

Presidential elections were held in Austria on 23 May 1965, following the death of incumbent President Adolf Schärf on 28 February. The result was a victory for Franz Jonas of the Socialist Party, who received 51% of the vote. Voter turnout was 96%.

== Results ==
Candidate	Party	Votes	%
Franz Jonas	Socialist Party of Austria	2,324,436	50.69
Alfons Gorbach	Austrian People's Party	2,260,888	49.31
Total		4,585,324	100.00
Valid votes		4,585,324	97.99
Invalid/blank votes		94,103	2.01
Total votes		4,679,427	100.00
Registered voters/turnout		4,874,928	95.99
Source: Nohlen & Stöver
