= 1959 Austrian legislative election =

← 1956	10 May 1959	1962 →

All 165 seats in the National Council 83 seats needed for a majority
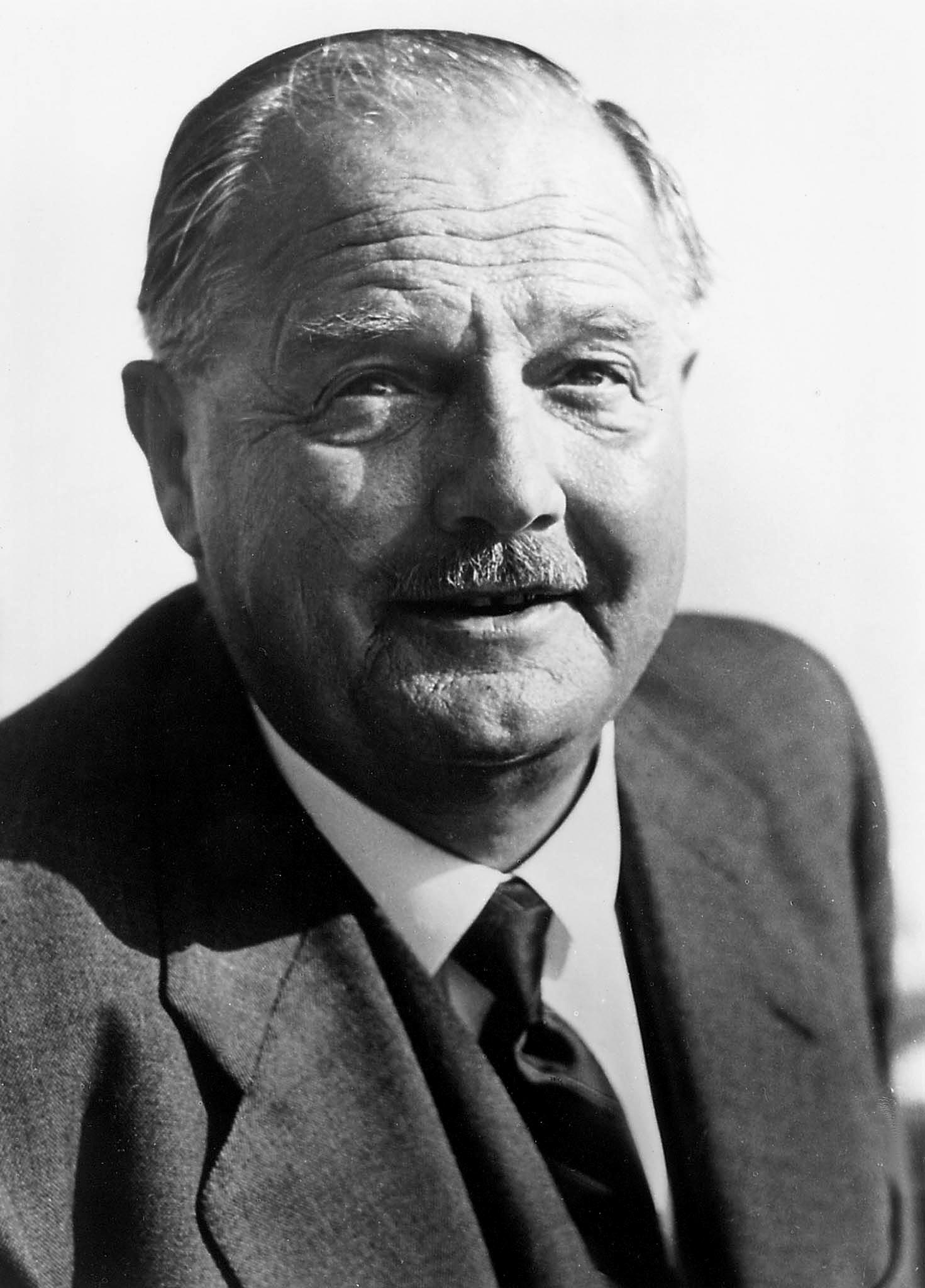

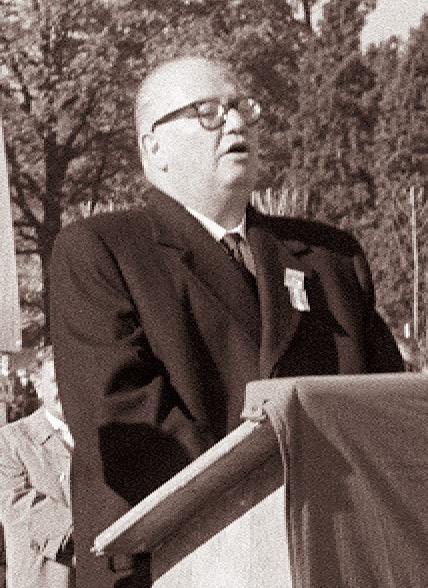

	First party	Second party	Third party
Leader	Julius Raab	Bruno Pittermann	Friedrich Peter
Party	ÖVP	SPÖ	FPÖ
Last election	45.96%, 82 seats	43.05%, 74 seats	6.52%, 6 seats
Seats won	79	78	8
Seat change	▼3	▲4	▲2
Popular vote	1,928,043	1,953,935	336,110
Percentage	44.19%	44.79%	7.70%
Swing	▼1.77pp	▲1.74pp	▲1.18pp
- Results by constituency
Chancellor before election
Julius Raab
ÖVP
Elected Chancellor
Julius Raab
ÖVP

Parliamentary elections were held in Austria on 10 May 1959. Although the Socialist Party (SPÖ) received the most votes, the Austrian People's Party won one more seat than the SPÖ. The Communist Party of Austria lost its remaining three seats and has not returned to the National Council since. Voter turnout was 94%. The grand coalition that had governed the country since 1945 remained in office, with People's Party leader Julius Raab as chancellor and Socialist leader Bruno Pittermann as vice-chancellor.

== Results ==
Party	Votes	%	Seats	+/–
Socialist Party of Austria	1,953,935	44.79	78	+4
Austrian People's Party	1,928,043	44.19	79	–3
Freedom Party of Austria	336,110	7.70	8	+2
Communists and Left Socialists	142,578	3.27	0	–3
League of Democratic Socialists	2,190	0.05	0	New
Total	4,362,856	100.00	165	0
Valid votes	4,362,856	98.60		
Invalid/blank votes	61,802	1.40		
Total votes	4,424,658	100.00		
Registered voters/turnout	4,696,603	94.21		
Source: Nohlen & Stöver

=== Results by state ===
State	SPÖ	ÖVP	FPÖ	KLS	BDS
Burgenland	46.5	47.3	5.0	1.2	-
Carinthia	50.5	32.7	13.5	2.5	0.8
Lower Austria	42.1	50.6	4.3	2.9	-
Upper Austria	42.0	47.3	8.7	2.0	-
Salzburg	38.7	44.2	15.2	1.9	-
Styria	45.3	44.7	6.8	3.1	-
Tyrol	31.5	59.4	7.9	1.2	-
Vorarlberg	30.1	56.4	12.1	1	-
Vienna	52.4	34.4	7.4	5.8	-
Austria	44.8	44.2	7.7	3.3	0.1
Source: Institute for Social Research and Consulting (SORA)
