= Markus Gstöttner =

Austrian politician (born 1986)

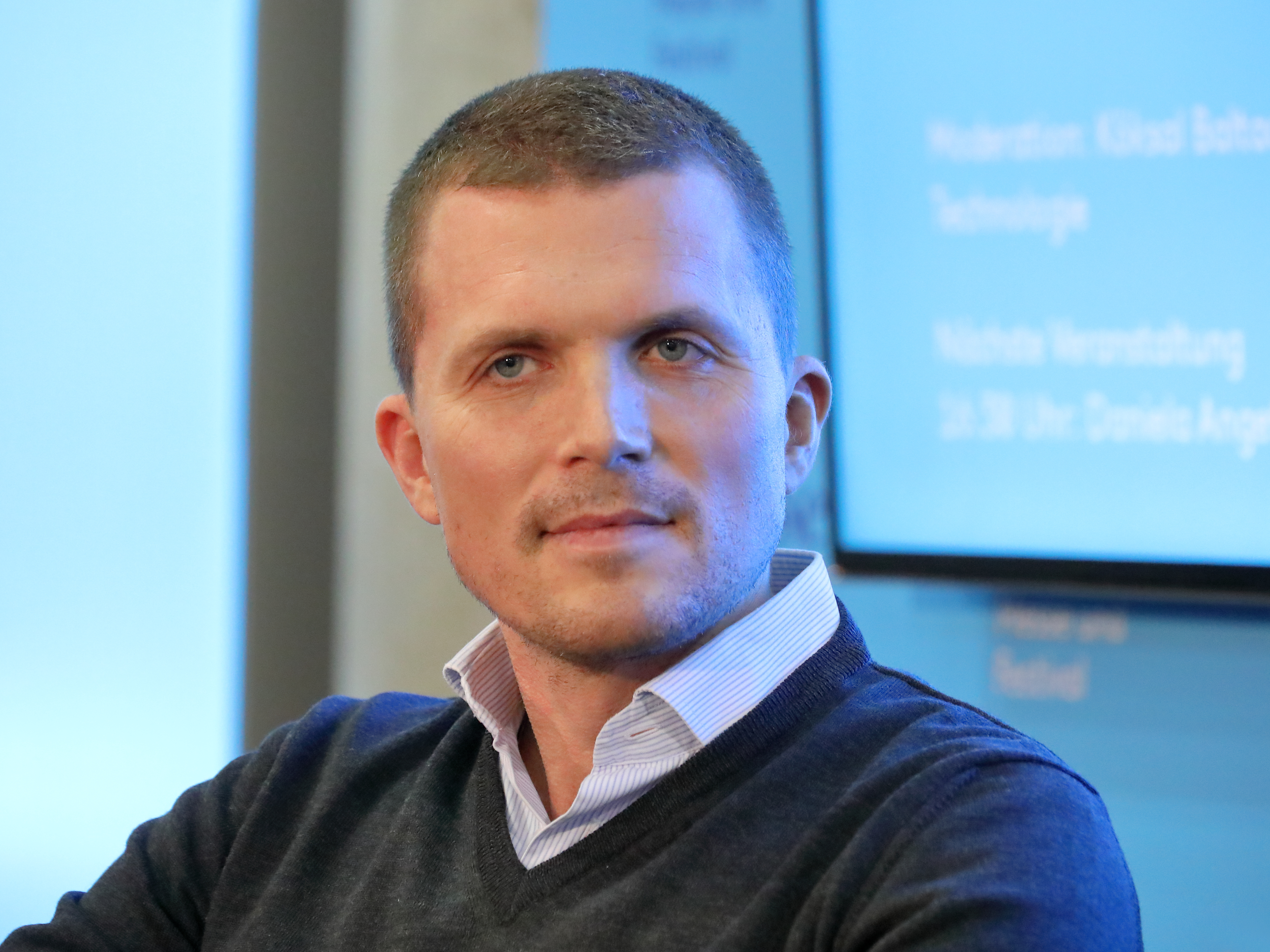
Markus Gstöttner

Markus Gstöttner (born August 9, 1986 in Vienna) is the Secretary General of the Austrian People's Party (ÖVP). He is local councillor, member of the Vienna State Parliament and former head of cabinet of Federal Chancellor Karl Nehammer. Previously, he was deputy head of cabinet of Chancellor Sebastian Kurz in the federal government Kurz I, in the federal government Kurz II and under Chancellor Alexander Schallenberg.

Prior to his political career, Gstöttner was an associate partner at McKinsey & Company in London from 2011 to 2017. From 2014 to 2017, he was the initiator of a pro bono project in Beirut, Lebanon, to support educational opportunities for Syrian refugee children.

== Personal life ==
Born and raised in Vienna, he attended the Schottengymnasium, where he graduated in 2004. After completing his military service with the Austrian Armed Forces, he studied at the London School of Economics and Political Science, graduating in 2010 with a Master of Science in Economics. After graduating, Gstöttner worked as a research associate at the Abdul Latif Jameel Poverty Action Lab (J-PAL). In 2011, he joined McKinsey & Company in London. As an associate partner, he was responsible for projects in Africa, Asia, Europe, the Middle East, and the United States. His work focused on transactions, growth strategy and the social sector. In 2017, he was one of the co-founders of a start-up in the biotechnology sector.

== Political career ==
Gstöttner started his political career in September 2017 as a policy officer in the Austrian People's Party. In December 2017, he joined the cabinet of Chancellor Sebastian Kurz in the Austrian Federal Chancellery as an economic advisor. From January to May 2019, he was the deputy head of cabinet and economic advisor to chancellor Kurz. With the inauguration of the federal government Kurz II he took over these two tasks again and kept this position also from October to December 2021 under Chancellor Alexander Schallenberg. When Karl Nehammer was sworn in as chancellor, Gstöttner was promoted to head of the cabinet. On October 7, 2022, it was announced that Gstöttner would give up his position as head of cabinet and switch to the private sector.

In 2020, he ran for the ÖVP in Vienna on the state list and on the district list in the Inner City. On 24 November 2020 he was sworn in as a municipal councillor and member of the Vienna State Parliament.
