= Heinrich Gleißner =

Austrian politician (1893–1984)

Heinrich Philipp Gleißner (26 January 1893, Linz – 18 January 1984, Linz) was an Austrian politician and lawyer who unsuccessfully ran for the Austrian presidency in 1951 as a candidate for the Austrian People's Party, served as the Governor of Upper Austria from 1934 to 1938 as a member of the Fatherland Front and again from 1945 to 1971, and as an Ambassador of Austria to the United Kingdom from 1979 to 1982. A graduate of Charles University, he served in the Kaiserschützen, being imprisoned in the Dachau concentration camp and the Buchenwald concentration camp during Second World War, he was later decorated with a Order of Merit of the Federal Republic of Germany, a Decoration of Honour for Services to the Republic of Austria, and a Legion of Honour. The Heinrich Gleißner Prize is named after him.
