= Rudolf Kirchschläger =

President of Austria from 1974 to 1986

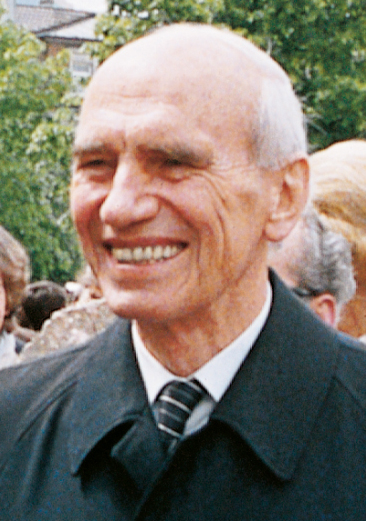
- Kirchschläger in 1983

President of Austria
- In office 8 July 1974 – 8 July 1986
- Chancellor: Bruno Kreisky; Fred Sinowatz; Franz Vranitzky
- Preceded by: Franz Jonas
- Succeeded by: Kurt Waldheim

Minister of Foreign Affairs
- In office 21 April 1970 – 24 June 1974
- Chancellor: Bruno Kreisky
- Preceded by: Kurt Waldheim
- Succeeded by: Erich Bielka

Personal details
- Born: 20 March 1915 Niederkappel, Upper Austria, Austria, Austro-Hungarian Empire
- Died: 30 March 2000 (aged 85) Vienna, Austria
- Spouse: Herma Sorger (m. 1940)
- Children: 2
- Education: University of Vienna (Dr. iur.)
- Profession: Diplomat; politician; judge
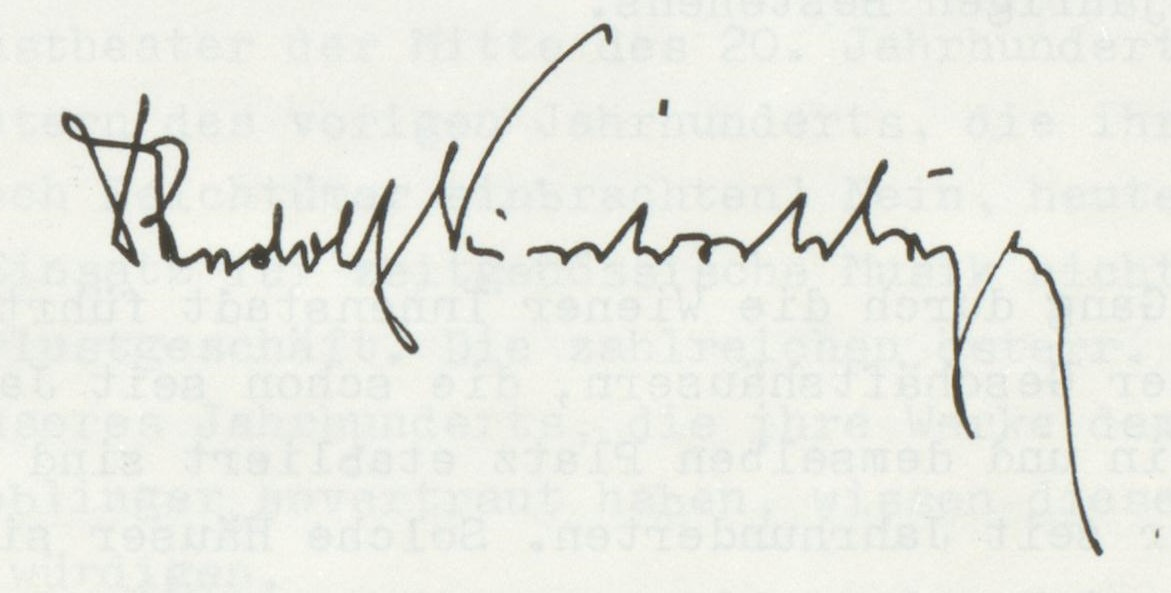
- Signature

Rudolf Kirchschläger (German: [ˈʁuːdɔlf ˈkɪʁçˌʃlɛːɡɐ]; 20 March 1915 – 30 March 2000) was an Austrian diplomat, politician and judge. From 1974 to 1986, he served as the president of Austria.

== Early life and education ==
Born in Niederkappel, Upper Austria, Kirschläger was orphaned at the age of 11. He graduated from high school in Horn in 1935 with distinction and started to study law at the University of Vienna. However, after the Anschluss of Austria in 1938, he had to give up his studies. Upon refusing to join the NSDAP, his scholarship was revoked and Kirchschläger could not finance his studies any longer. Kirchschläger worked as a bank clerk in 1938 until he was drafted to service in the infantry of the Wehrmacht in the summer of 1939. Kirchschläger fought as a soldier from the very beginning of the war, first during the invasion of Poland, later on the Western Front, and after 1941 against Russia on the Eastern Front.

In late 1940, in order to get out of the military, he used a two-month front-leave to prepare for the final exam (Staatsexamen) of his law studies. Subsequently, he passed the exams and graduated to Doctor iuris.

However, he was sent back to the Eastern Front, where he was wounded in 1942. Towards the end of war, he was captain and training officer at the military academy at Wiener Neustadt in the Vienna region. In early April 1945, commanding a company of cadets fighting approaching Soviet troops, he was badly wounded on his leg, an injury from which he never fully recovered.

== Post-World War II ==
After the war, Kirchschläger worked as a district judge until 1954 in Langenlois and later Vienna. In 1954, he got the chance to work in the Ministry of Foreign Affairs, although he did not speak any foreign languages. In order to take part in the negotiations on the Austrian State Treaty, he taught himself English in only a few months. From 1967 until 1970, he was ambassador in Prague. Despite orders not to do so, he issued exit visas to Czechoslovak citizens who tried to flee from the Communists during the Soviet invasion of Czechoslovakia. From 1970 to 1974 he was Minister of Foreign Affairs.

== Presidency ==
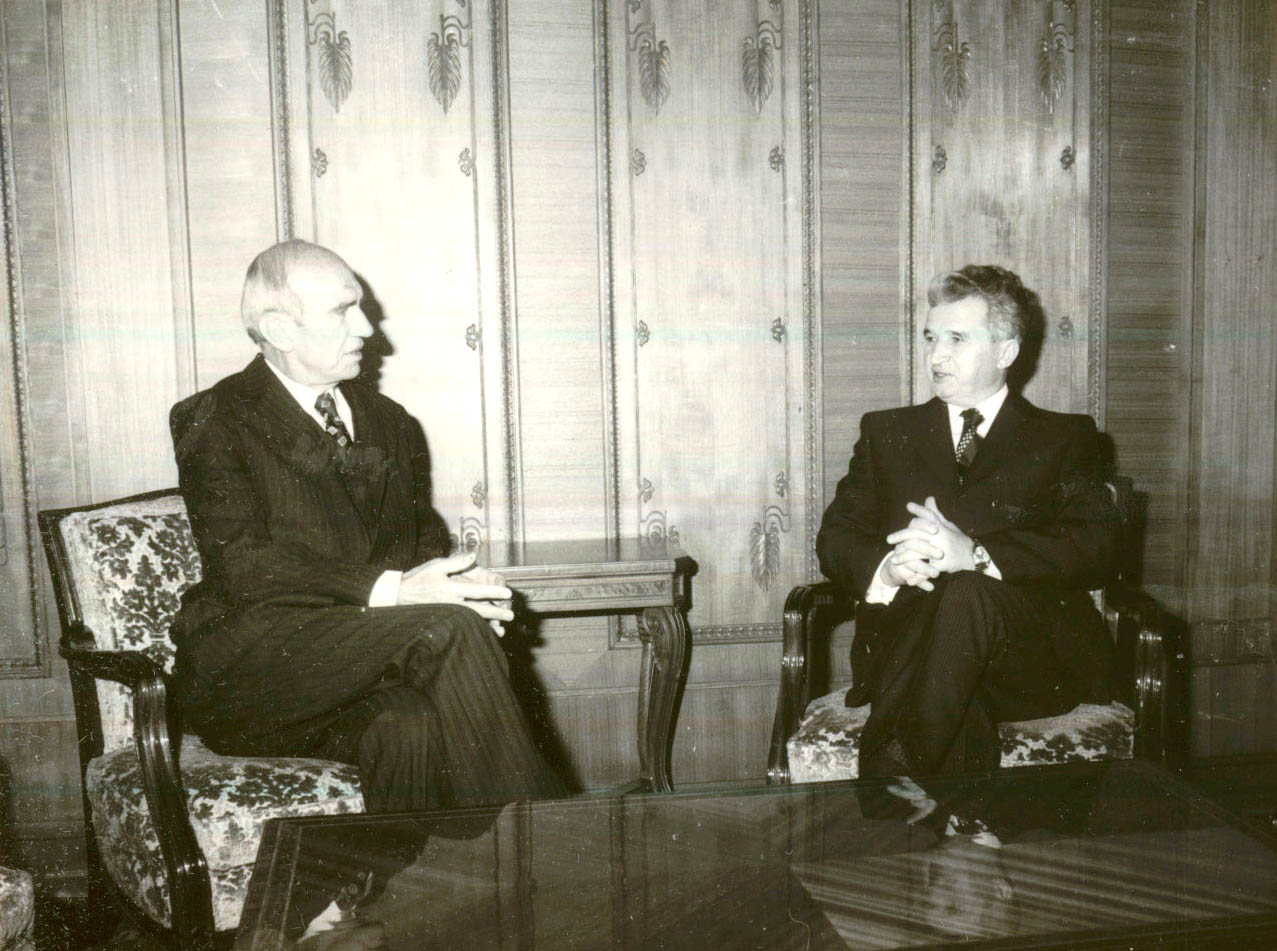
Kirchschläger with Nicolae Ceaușescu, 1978

Kirchschläger was elected President of Austria in 1974. In a programmatic lecture at Innsbruck University in February 1971 he outlined his understanding of an "ethical foreign policy". In 1974, he issued a pardon to convicted Austrian Nazi war criminal Franz Novak, who had coordinated the railroad deportation of European Jews to concentration and extermination camps.

In 1980, he was elected for a second term with an approval rate of 80%, the highest rate ever obtained in any presidential elections. In February 1984, he paid the first state visit of an Austrian president to the United States.

== Post-presidency ==
Kirchschläger would be interviewed in 1998 by Karen Lienhardt to contribute to Lienhardt's paper called Transformation and Sematic Change of Austrian Neutrality. Kirchschläger would notably conclude that neutral status supports and has secured Austrian sovereignty and security by allowing Austria to attain international significance through its role as a mediator, international peace meeting place, and refuge for asylum seekers. Kirchschläger uniquely holds neutrality in higher regard with respect to its role in ensuring Austrian security compared to other interviewees such as Hugo Portisch and Kurt Waldheim.

== Personal life and death ==
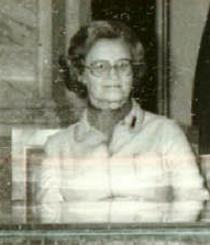
Kirchschläger's wife, Herma Kirchschläger in 1978

He was married to Herma Sorger (1916–2009) from 17 August 1940 until his death; they had two children: Christa (born 1944) and Walter (born 1947).

Kirchschläger died of a heart attack on 30 March 2000 near Vienna, aged 85.

== Honours ==
=== Austrian honours ===
- Grand-Cross Order of Merit of the Austrian Republic, Austria (1974)

=== Foreign honours ===
- Grand-Cross of the Order of Merit of the Italian Republic, Italy (1971)
- Knight of the Order of the Gold Lion of the House of Nassau, House of Nassau (1975)
- Knight of the Collar of the Order of Isabella the Catholic, Spain (1978)
- Knight of the Order of the Elephant, Denmark (1979)
- Knight of the Collar of the Order of Charles III, Spain (1979)
- Grand Collar of the Order of Prince Henry, Portugal (1984)
- Grand-Cross of the Order of Pope Pius IX, Holy See (1990)
- First Class of the Order of Tomáš Garrigue Masaryk, Czech Republic (1996)
- Knight Grand Cross with Collar of Order of Pope Pius IX, Holy See (2000)

== Literature ==
- Rudolf Kirchschläger, Der Friede beginnt im eigenen Haus. Gedanken über Österreich. Vienna: Molden (1980); ISBN 3-217-01070-1
- Rudolf Kirchschläger, Ethik und Außenpolitik Hans Köchler (ed.), Philosophie und Politik. Dokumentation eines interdisziplinären Seminars. Innsbruck: Arbeitsgemeinschaft für Wissenschaft und Politik, pp. 69–74 (1973)
- Alois Mock, Herbert Schambeck (Hrsg.): Verantwortung in unserer Zeit. Festschrift für Rudolf Kirchschläger. Österreichische Staatsdruckerei, 1990.
- Rabl, Erich: Rudolf Kirchschläger (1915-2000), Jurist, Diplomat, Außenminister und Bundespräsident. In: Harald Hitz, Franz Pötscher, Erich Rabl, Thomas Winkelbauer (Hg.): Waldviertler Biographien, Bd. 3, Horn (Waldviertler Heimatbund) 2010, S. 399–428. ISBN 3-900708-26-6.
- Schenz, Marco: Bundespräsident Rudolf Kirchschläger. Böhlau-Verlag, Wien 1984.
