= Niederkappel =

- Municipality
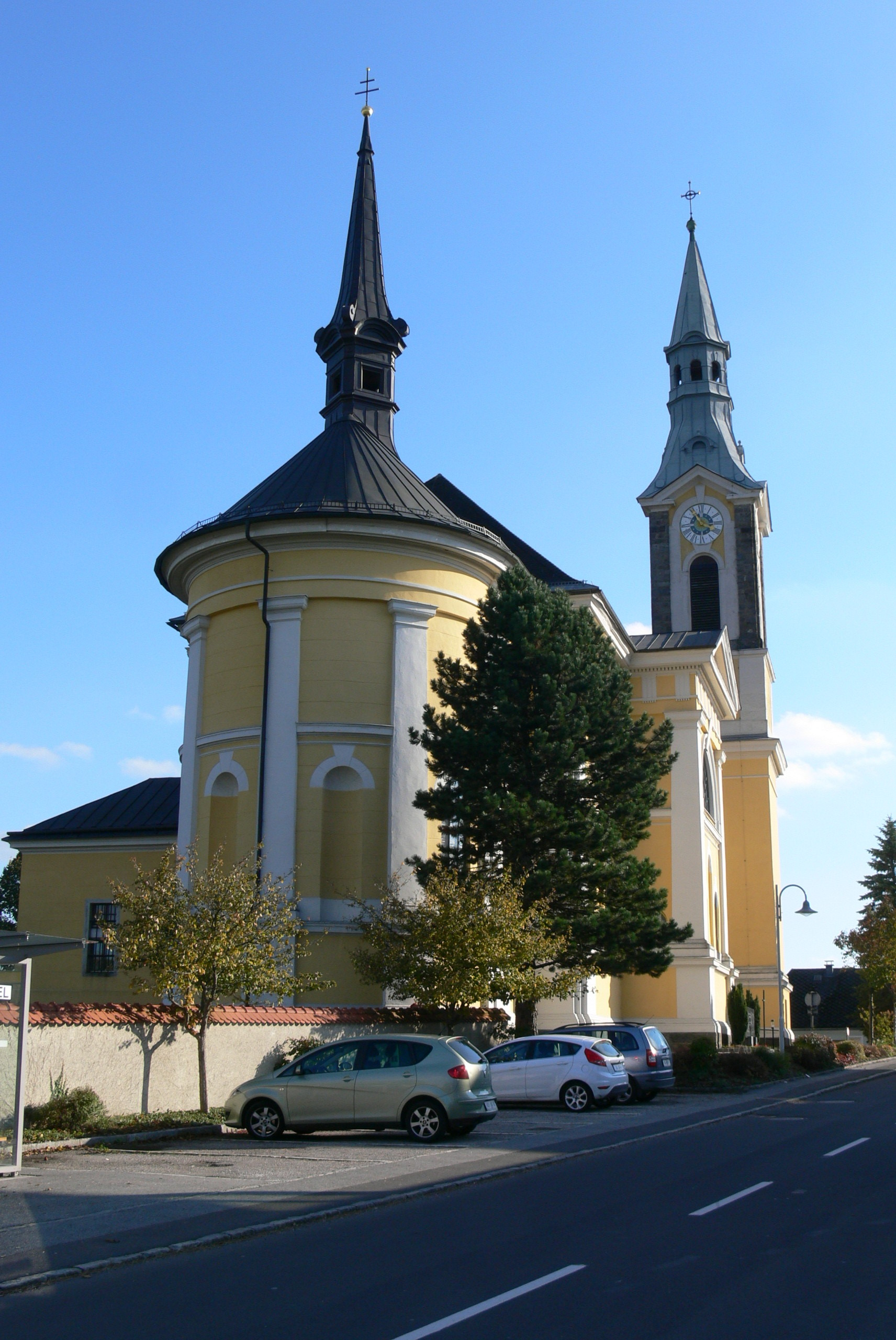

- Coat of arms

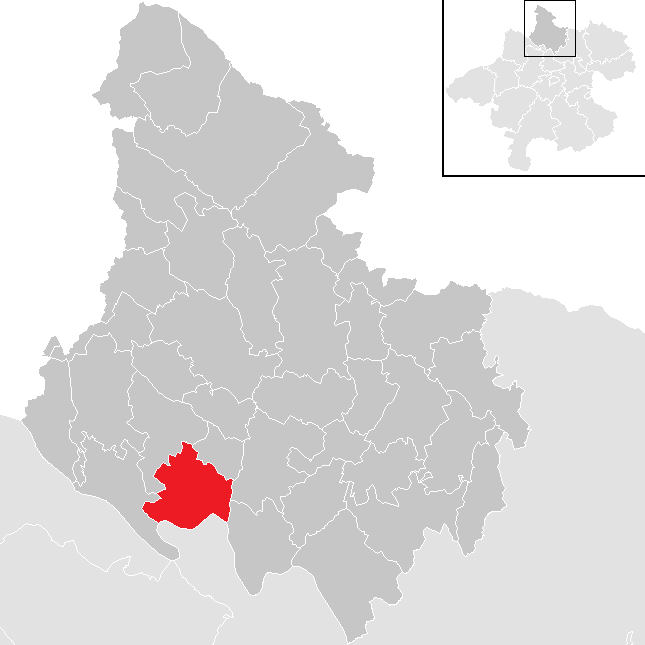
- Location in the district

- Location within Austria
- Coordinates: 48°27′57″N 13°52′55″E
- Country: Austria
- State: Upper Austria
- District: Rohrbach

Government
  - Mayor: Josef Wögerbauer (ÖVP)

Area
  - Total: 22.44 km^{2} (8.66 sq mi)
- Elevation: 549 m (1,801 ft)

Population (2018-01-01)
  - Total: 985
  - Density: 43.9/km^{2} (114/sq mi)
- Time zone: UTC+1 (CET)
  - Summer (DST): UTC+2 (CEST)
- Postal code: 4133
- Area code: 07286
- Vehicle registration: RO
- Website: www.niederkappel.at

Niederkappel is a municipality in the district of Rohrbach in the Austrian state of Upper Austria.

== Population ==
Historical population
Year	Pop.	±%
1869	1,425	—
1880	1,351	−5.2%
1890	1,350	−0.1%
1900	1,349	−0.1%
1910	1,393	+3.3%
1923	1,353	−2.9%
1934	1,445	+6.8%
1939	1,258	−12.9%
1951	1,333	+6.0%
1961	1,287	−3.5%
1971	1,124	−12.7%
1981	1,100	−2.1%
1991	1,095	−0.5%
2001	1,039	−5.1%
2011	974	−6.3%
2017	986	+1.2%
