= 1974 Austrian presidential election =

- 23 June 1974
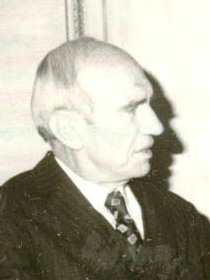

| Nominee | Rudolf Kirchschläger | Alois Lugger |
| Party | SPÖ | ÖVP |
| Popular vote | 2,392,367 | 2,238,470 |
| Percentage | 51.66% | 48.34% |
President before election
Franz Jonas
SPÖ
Elected President
Rudolf Kirchschläger
SPÖ

Presidential elections were held in Austria on 23 June 1974 after incumbent President Franz Jonas died on 24 April. The Socialist Party nominated Foreign Minister Rudolf Kirchschläger, who won the election with 52% of the vote. The only other candidate was the mayor of Innsbruck, Alois Lugger, of the Austrian People's Party.

== Results ==
| Candidate | Party | Votes | % |
|---|---|---|---|
| Rudolf Kirchschläger | Socialist Party of Austria | 2,392,367 | 51.66 |
| Alois Lugger | Austrian People's Party | 2,238,470 | 48.34 |
| Total | | 4,630,837 | 100.00 |
| Valid votes | | 4,630,837 | 97.84 |
| Invalid/blank votes | | 102,179 | 2.16 |
| Total votes | | 4,733,016 | 100.00 |
| Registered voters/turnout | | 5,031,772 | 94.06 |
Source: Nohlen & Stöver
