= 1951 Austrian presidential election =

- 6 May 1951 (first round); 27 May 1951 (second round)
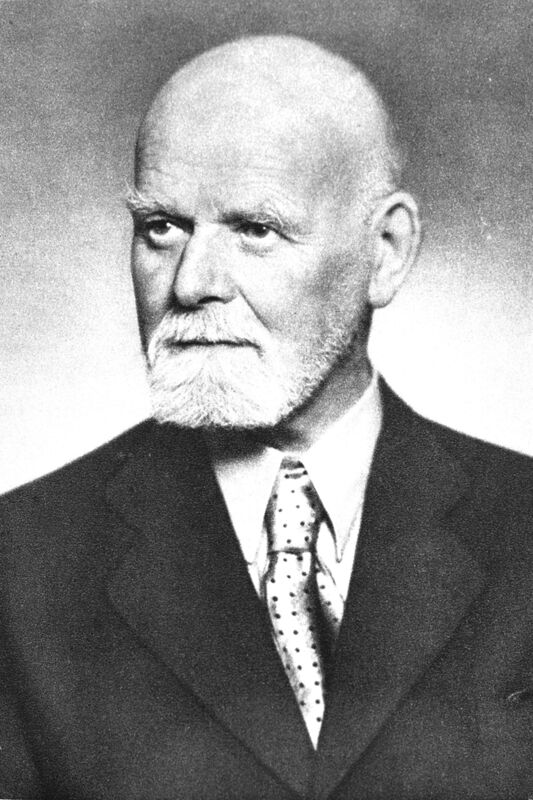

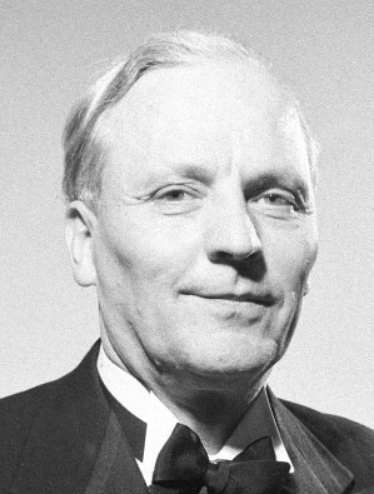
Nominee	Theodor Körner	Heinrich Gleißner
Party	SPÖ	ÖVP
Home state	Vienna	Upper Austria
Popular vote	2,178,631	2,006,322
Percentage	52.06%	47.94%
President before election
Leopold Figl (Acting)
ÖVP
Elected President
Theodor Körner
SPÖ

Presidential elections were held in Austria in 1951, the first time that the President of Austria had been elected by popular vote. A first round of voting was held on 6 May, and with no candidate achieving a majority of the votes, a second round was held on 27 May between the top two candidates, Mayor of Vienna, Theodor Körner representing the Socialist Party's, and Upper Austria Governor Heinrich Gleißner of the Austrian People's Party. Although Gleißner received the most votes in the first round Körner won the runoff with 52% of the vote.

== Background ==
A constitutional amendment in 1929 would have seen the president being elected directly, but a planned election in 1931 was cancelled and the president was instead elected by Parliament as a public vote was deemed too expensive. After the suspension of the constitution in 1934, and Austria ceasing to exist in 1938, the first presidential elections by popular vote were to be held in 1945. However, because the Allied council did not approve the constitutional law passed by the National Council, the election was again held by the Federal Assembly.

== Results ==
Candidate	Party	First round		Second round	
Candidate	Party	Votes	%	Votes	%
Heinrich Gleißner	Austrian People's Party	1,725,451	40.14	2,006,322	47.94
Theodor Körner	Socialist Party of Austria	1,682,881	39.15	2,178,631	52.06
Burghard Breitner	Federation of Independents	662,501	15.41		
Gottlieb Fiala	Communist Party of Austria	219,969	5.12		
Johannes Ude	Independent	5,413	0.13		
Ludovica Hainisch	Independent	2,132	0.05		
Total		4,298,347	100.00	4,184,953	100.00
Valid votes		4,298,347	98.35	4,184,953	95.70
Invalid/blank votes		72,227	1.65	188,241	4.30
Total votes		4,370,574	100.00	4,373,194	100.00
Registered voters/turnout		4,513,597	96.83	4,513,597	96.89
Source: Ministry of the Interior
