= 1963 Austrian presidential election =

- 28 April 1963
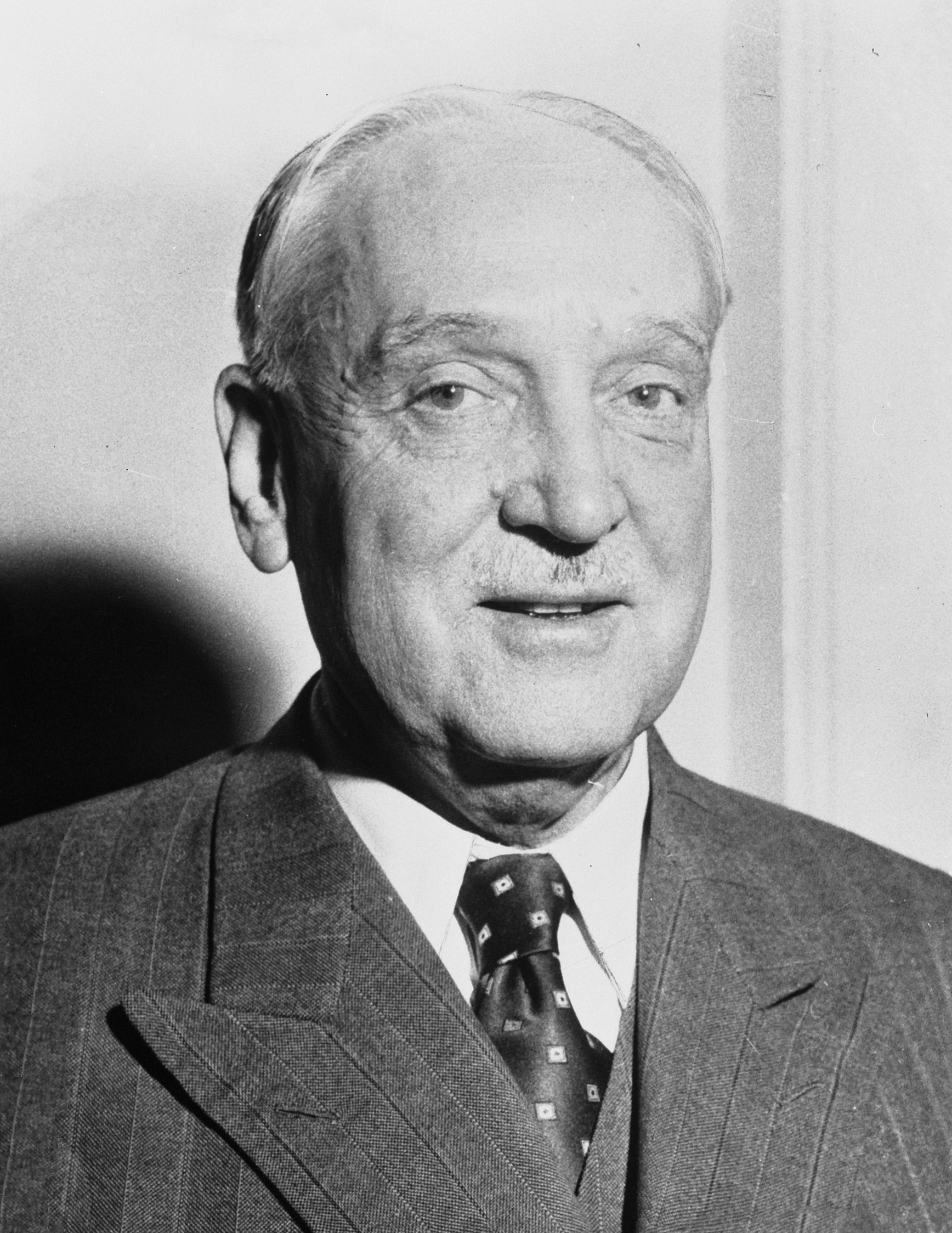

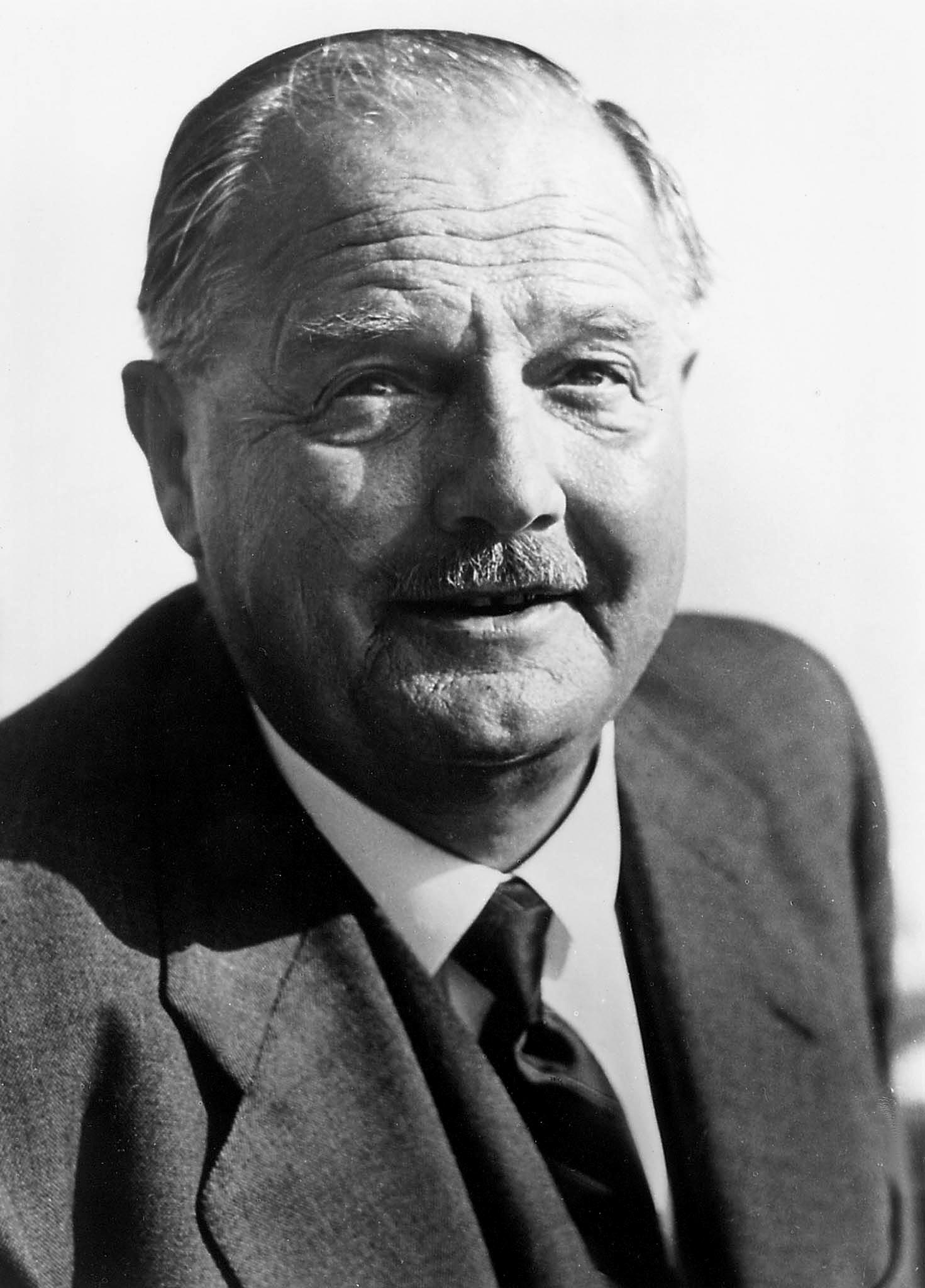
Nominee	Adolf Schärf	Julius Raab
Party	SPÖ	ÖVP
Home state	Vienna	Lower Austria
Popular vote	2,473,349	1,814,125
Percentage	55.41%	40.64%
President before election
Adolf Schärf
SPÖ
Elected President
Adolf Schärf
SPÖ

Presidential elections were held in Austria on 28 April 1963. The result was a victory for incumbent President Adolf Schärf of the Socialist Party, who received 55% of the vote. Voter turnout was 96%.

== Results ==
Candidate	Party	Votes	%
Adolf Schärf	Socialist Party of Austria	2,473,349	55.41
Julius Raab	Austrian People's Party	1,814,125	40.64
Josef Kimmel	Independent	176,646	3.96
Total		4,464,120	100.00
Valid votes		4,464,120	95.91
Invalid/blank votes		190,537	4.09
Total votes		4,654,657	100.00
Registered voters/turnout		4,869,603	95.59
Source: Nohlen & Stöver
