= Franz Jonas =

President of Austria from 1965 to 1974

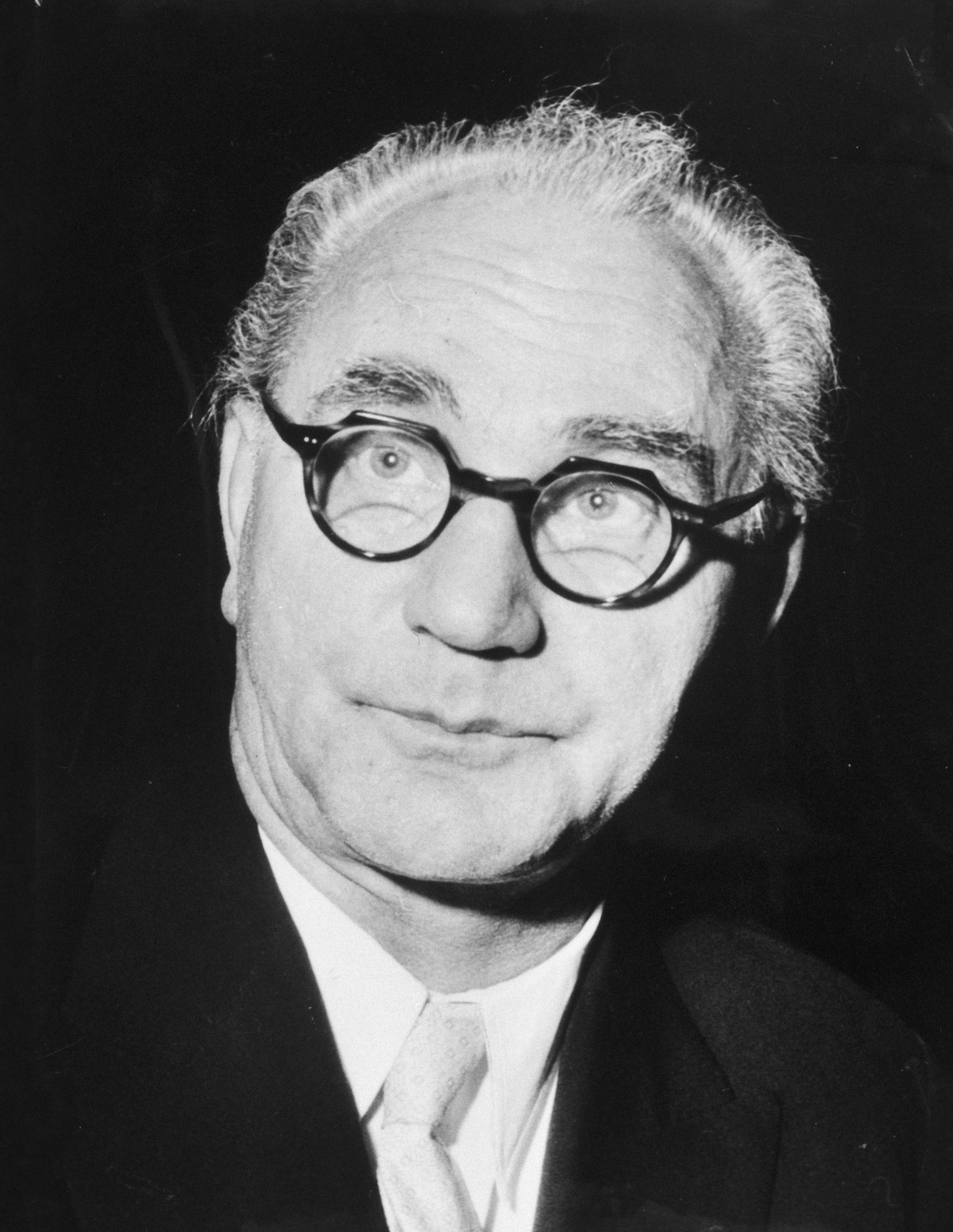
- Jonas in 1965

President of Austria
- In office 9 June 1965 – 24 April 1974
- Chancellor: Josef Klaus; Bruno Kreisky
- Preceded by: Adolf Schärf
- Succeeded by: Rudolf Kirchschläger

Mayor and Governor of Vienna
- In office 18 June 1951 – 9 June 1965
- Preceded by: Theodor Körner
- Succeeded by: Bruno Marek

Personal details
- Born: 4 October 1899 Floridsdorf, Austria-Hungary
- Died: 24 April 1974 (aged 74) Vienna, Austria
- Party: Socialist Party of Austria
- Spouse: Margarete Towarek

Franz Josef Jonas (4 October 1899 – 24 April 1974) was an Austrian politician who served as the president of Austria between 1965 and 1974 as a member of the Socialist Party of Austria. He previously served as mayor of Vienna from 1951 to 1965 while simultaneously serving in the Austrian Parliament. Jonas first entered politics as a young adult while he was working as a typesetter, joining the Socialist Youth Movement and the Printers' Union. He served on the town council of Floridsdorf beginning in 1945 and was then placed in command of Vienna's food supply and housing in 1948 and 1949, respectively. Jonas took interest in international affairs, making several international trips as mayor and as president. As president, he oversaw the creation of a minority government under Bruno Kreisky, the leader of the Socialist Party. Jonas died in office after he was diagnosed with stomach cancer.

== Early life and career ==
Franz Jonas was born in Vienna on 4 October 1899. He was born to a working-class family and had seven siblings. After graduating school, he attended the printers' school of graphic arts. He later attended the Wiener Arbeiterbildungszentrum (transl. Viennese Workers' Education Centre) where his instructors included fellow future presidents Karl Renner, Adolf Schärf, and Theodor Körner. He did not receive formal schooling at a traditional university. Jonas was conscripted during World War I to fight in the Austro-Hungarian Armed Forces in 1917. He served in the Deutschmeister regiment, where he served on the Eastern Front and the Italian front. He got a job as a typesetter at the end of the war in 1919 and continued in the profession until 1932.

Jonas met Margarete "Grete" Towarek in 1921 at the home of a worker with the socialists, and they married on 22 December 1922. They honeymooned in the Vienna Woods and then moved into a Krankenhaushäusern in Floridsdorf. They did not have any children, as they were first unable to support any financially and then were unable to have any because of health complications. Jonas was interested in designing stamps, and he played sports. He was also an Esperantist, joining the Esperanto workers movement and becoming an instructor of the language.

Jonas became active in socialist politics, joining the Socialist Youth Movement, becoming an official in the Printers' Union, and serving as socialist organiser for his district in the 1930s. He was arrested along with numerous other socialists in 1935 and charged with treason, but he was acquitted and released in 1936. The typesetter shop where he had worked closed at this time, leaving him unemployed. Jonas became an engine factory clerk during World War II. He was appointed to the town council of Floridsdorf after the Allied powers took control of Austria in 1945, where he became chairman in 1946. Jonas was put in command of Vienna's food supply in 1948, and he became the Viennese Commissioner for Housing in 1949. He became leader of Vienna's branch of the Socialist Party of Austria (SPÖ) in 1950.

== Mayor of Vienna ==
Jonas became mayor of Vienna in June 1951 as the previous office holder, his former instructor Körner, became president of Austria. Jonas served as the Viennese mayor for 14 years. Because of his interest in foreign affairs, Jonas made several international trips while he was mayor. He emphasised the city's international significance, seeking to revitalise it as a hub for European culture and diplomacy. Jonas was elected to parliament the same year his mayoralty began. He served in the Federal Council from 1951 to 1953 and then moved to the National Council. He held this position until he was elected president in 1965. As mayor, Jonas also served the chairman of the Austrian union of towns and an executive within the Council of European Municipalities and Regions. He was generally popular as mayor.

== President of Austria ==
President Adolf Schärf of the Socialist Party of Austria (SPÖ) died in office, prompting a presidential election in 1965. Jonas won the election and was elected president on 23 May 1965. He was elected by the SPÖ with a popular vote of 2,324,436, defeating Austrian People's Party (ÖVP) candidate Alfons Gorbach who received 2,260,888 votes. Jonas's lack of a formal education was a major issue during the election. He took office on 21 June 1951.

In 1966, Jonas was awarded the Grand Cross of The Royal Norwegian Order of St. Olav with Collar, and in 1969 the ÖOC Pierre de Coubertin Medal.

Jonas used his power to reject government appointments in the 1960s to oppose the ÖVP government's choices for president of the administrative court and for ambassador to West Germany. Jonas was popular among the public, to the point that SPÖ party leader Bruno Kreisky tried to make their names synonymous during the 1970 legislative election. No party won a majority of seats, so Jonas was responsible for approving a negotiated government. The SPÖ held a plurality and Kreisky asked Jonas to appoint a minority government with the implicit endorsement of the Freedom Party of Austria. Rather than force coalition negotiations, Jonas agreed and appointed Kreisky as chancellor of Austria. Jonas was reelected president on 25 April 1971. He received 2,488,372 votes, defeating ÖVP candidate Kurt Waldheim who received 2,225,368 votes. Jonas's second term began on 9 June 1971.

Continuing his interest in international affairs, Jonas visited Iran in 1965, the United Kingdom in 1966, Thailand and Canada in 1967, Yugoslavia in 1968, Switzerland and Romania in 1969, Belgium, Bulgaria, and Hungary in 1970, Finland in 1972, and West Germany in 1973. His visit to the United Kingdom received widespread attention as it was the first time a leader of a former Axis nation visited an Allied nation. He also hosted several leaders in Vienna, including Norwegian king Olav V, Soviet president Nikolai Podgorny, Yugoslav president Josip Broz Tito, British queen Elizabeth II, and Romanian president Nicolae Ceaușescu. Jonas removed himself from his duties as president on 27 March 1974 following a diagnosis of stomach cancer. He died in a Vienna University clinic on 24 April 1974.

Political offices
| Preceded by Theodor Körner | Mayor and Governor of Vienna; 1951–1965 | Succeeded by Bruno Marek |
| Preceded by Adolf Schärf | President of Austria; 1965–1974 | Succeeded by Rudolf Kirchschläger |
