= 1957 Austrian presidential election =

- 5 May 1957
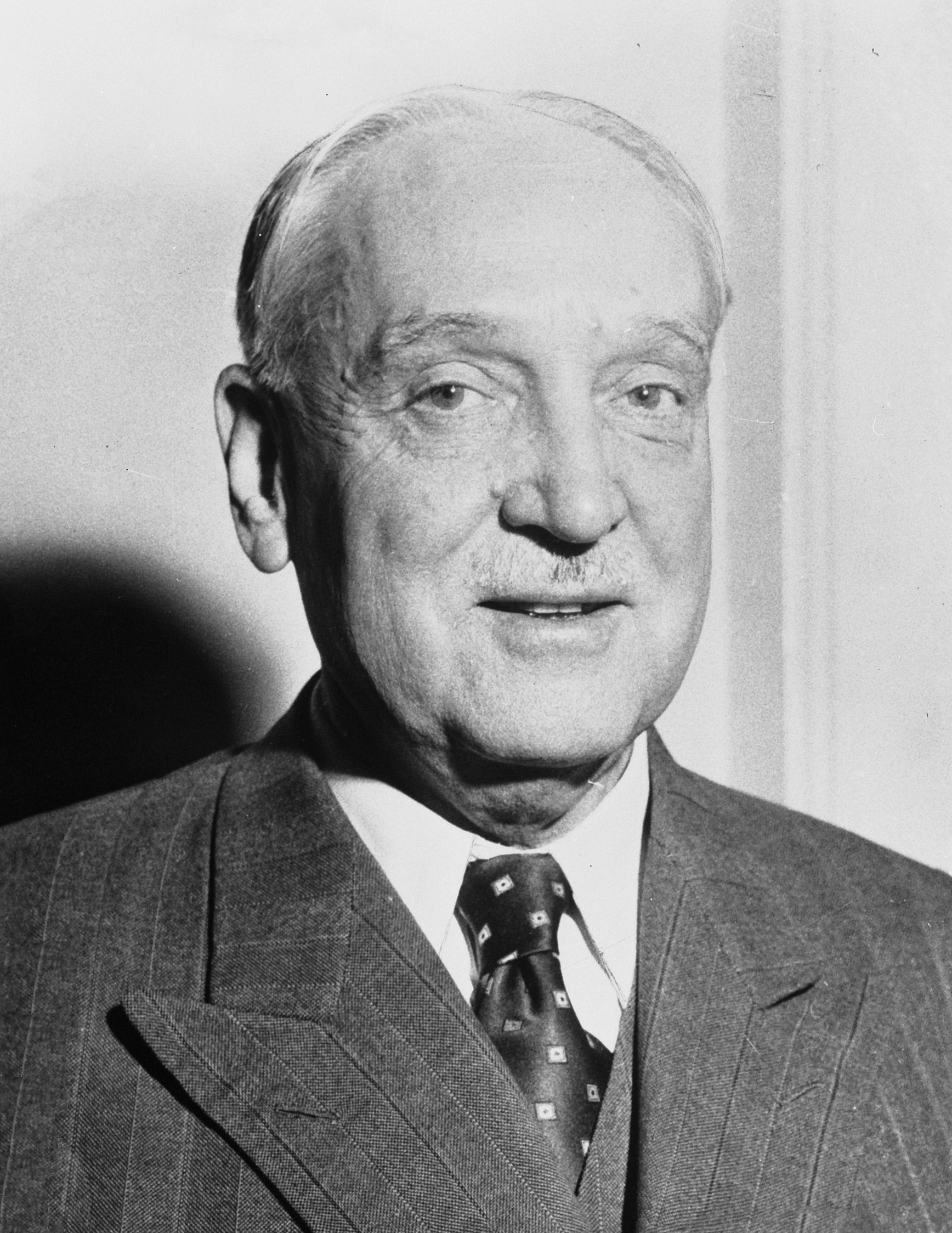

| Nominee | Adolf Schärf | Wolfgang Denk |
| Party | SPÖ | ÖVP |
| Home state | Vienna | Upper Austria |
| Popular vote | 2,258,255 | 2,159,604 |
| Percentage | 51.12% | 48.88% |
President before election
Theodor Körner
SPÖ
Elected President
Adolf Schärf
SPÖ

Presidential elections were held in Austria on 5 May 1957. There were only two candidates, with Adolf Schärf of the Socialist Party winning with 51% of the vote. Voter turnout was 97%.

== Results ==
| Candidate | Party | Votes | % |
|---|---|---|---|
| Adolf Schärf | Socialist Party | 2,258,255 | 51.12 |
| Wolfgang Denk | ÖVP–FPÖ | 2,159,604 | 48.88 |
| Total | | 4,417,859 | 100.00 |
| Valid votes | | 4,417,859 | 98.18 |
| Invalid/blank votes | | 81,706 | 1.82 |
| Total votes | | 4,499,565 | 100.00 |
| Registered voters/turnout | | 4,630,997 | 97.16 |
Source: Nohlen & Stöver
