= 1971 Austrian presidential election =

- 25 April 1971
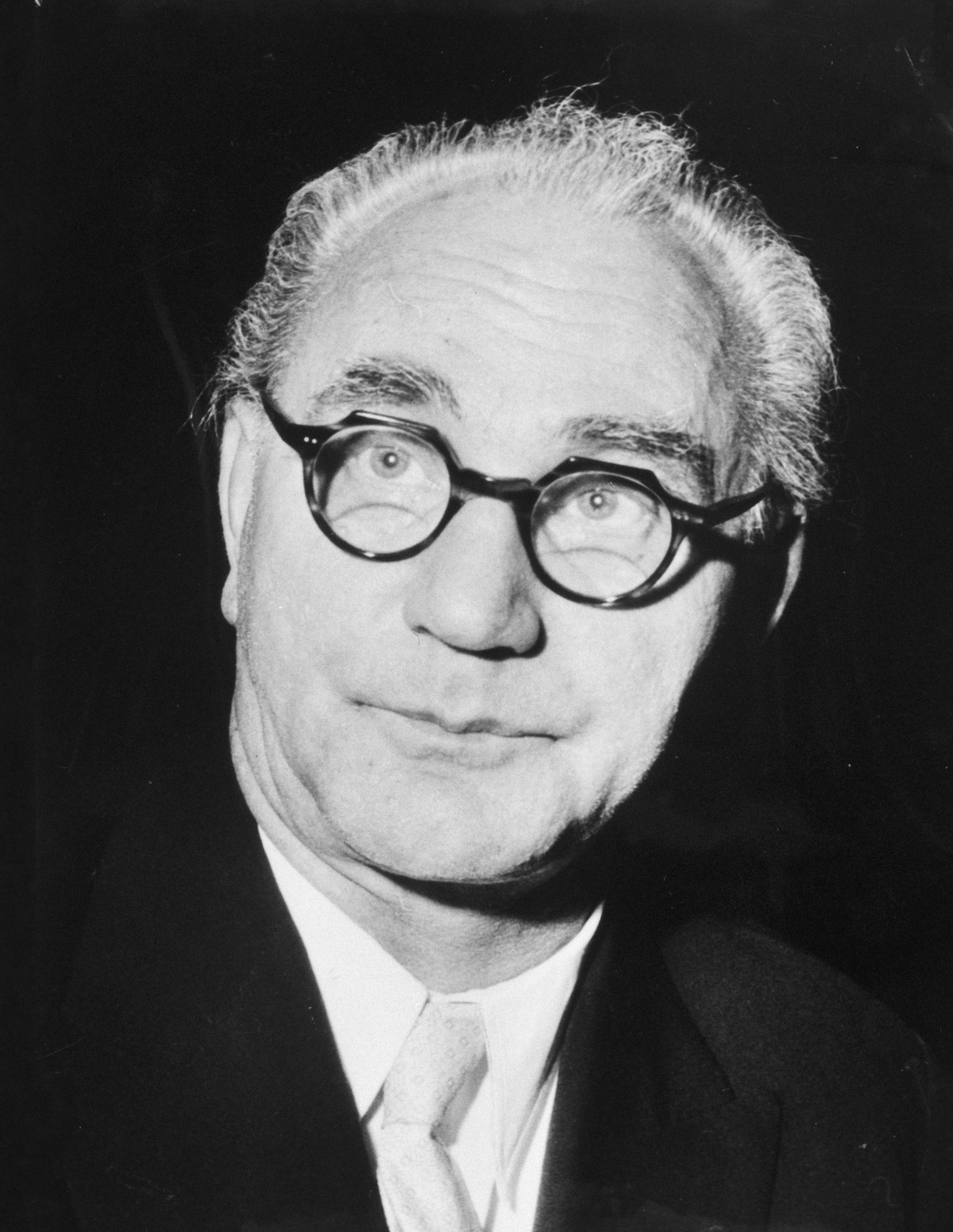

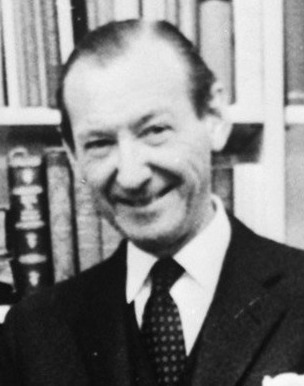
Nominee	Franz Jonas	Kurt Waldheim
Party	SPÖ	ÖVP
Home state	Vienna	Vienna
Popular vote	2,487,239	2,224,809
Percentage	52.78%	47.22%
President before election
Franz Jonas
SPÖ
Elected President
Franz Jonas
SPÖ

Presidential elections were held in Austria on 25 April 1971. The result was a victory for incumbent President Franz Jonas of the Socialist Party, who received 53% of the vote. Voter turnout was 95%.

== Results ==
Candidate	Party	Votes	%
Franz Jonas	Socialist Party of Austria	2,487,239	52.78
Kurt Waldheim	Austrian People's Party	2,224,809	47.22
Total		4,712,048	100.00
Valid votes		4,712,048	98.42
Invalid/blank votes		75,658	1.58
Total votes		4,787,706	100.00
Registered voters/turnout		5,024,324	95.29
Source: Nohlen & Stöver
