= Austrian People's Party =

Conservative political party in Austria

Austrian People's Party Österreichische Volkspartei
- Abbreviation: ÖVP
- Chairperson: Christian Stocker
- Secretary General: Markus Gstöttner
- Parliamentary leader: Ernst Gödl
- Leader in the EP: Reinhold Lopatka
- Founded: 17 April 1945; 81 years ago
- Headquarters: Lichtenfelsgasse 7, 1010; First District, Vienna
- Youth wing: Young People's Party
- Party academy: ÖVP Political Academy
- Membership (2017): c. 600,000
- Ideology: Christian democracy; Liberal conservatism
- Political position: Centre-right
- European affiliation: European People's Party
- European Parliament group: European People's Party Group
- International affiliation: International Democracy Union
- Colours: Turquoise (Note: Since 2017); Black (Note: Until 2017)
- National Council: 51 / 183
- Federal Council: 26 / 60
- Governorships: 5 / 9
- Landtag Seats: 136 / 440
- European Parliament: 5 / 20

Party flag

Website
- dievolkspartei.at

The Austrian People's Party (German: Österreichische Volkspartei [ˈøːstɐraɪçɪʃɛ ˌfɔlksparˈtaɪ], ÖVP [ˌøːfaʊˈpeː]) is a Christian-democratic and liberal-conservative political party in Austria.

Since January 2025, the party has been led by Christian Stocker (as an acting leader). It is currently the second-largest party in the National Council, with 51 of the 183 seats, and won 26.3% of votes cast in the 2024 legislative election. It holds seats in all nine state legislatures, and is part of government in seven, of which it leads six. The ÖVP is a member of the International Democracy Union and the European People's Party. It sits with the EPP group in the European Parliament; of Austria's 19 MEPs, 5 are members of the ÖVP. It is the second largest party in Europe by membership.

An unofficial successor to the Christian Social Party of the late 19th and early 20th centuries and thus also of the Fatherland Front, the ÖVP was founded immediately following the re-establishment of the Republic of Austria in 1945. Since then, it has been one of the two traditional major parties in Austria, alongside the Social Democratic Party of Austria (SPÖ). It was the most popular party until 1970, and has traditionally governed in a grand coalition with the SPÖ. It was the senior partner in grand coalitions from 1945 to 1966 and the junior partner from 1986 to 2000 and 2007–2017. The ÖVP also briefly governed alone from 1966 to 1970. After the 1999 election, the party formed a coalition with the Freedom Party of Austria (FPÖ) until 2003, when a coalition with the FPÖ splinter Alliance for the Future of Austria was formed, which lasted until 2007.

== History ==
The ÖVP is the successor of the Christian Social Party, a staunchly conservative movement founded in 1893 by Karl Lueger, mayor of Vienna and highly controversial right-wing populist. Most of the members of the party during its founding belonged to the former Fatherland Front, which was led by chancellor Engelbert Dollfuss, also a member of the Christian Social Party before the Anschluss. While still sometimes honored by ÖVP members for resisting Adolf Hitler, the regime built by Dollfuss was authoritarian in nature and has been dubbed as Austrofascism. In its present form, the ÖVP was established immediately after the restoration of Austria's independence in 1945 and it has been represented in both the Federal Assembly ever since. In terms of Federal Assembly seats, the ÖVP has consistently been the strongest or second-strongest party and as such it has led or at least been a partner in most Austria's federal cabinets.

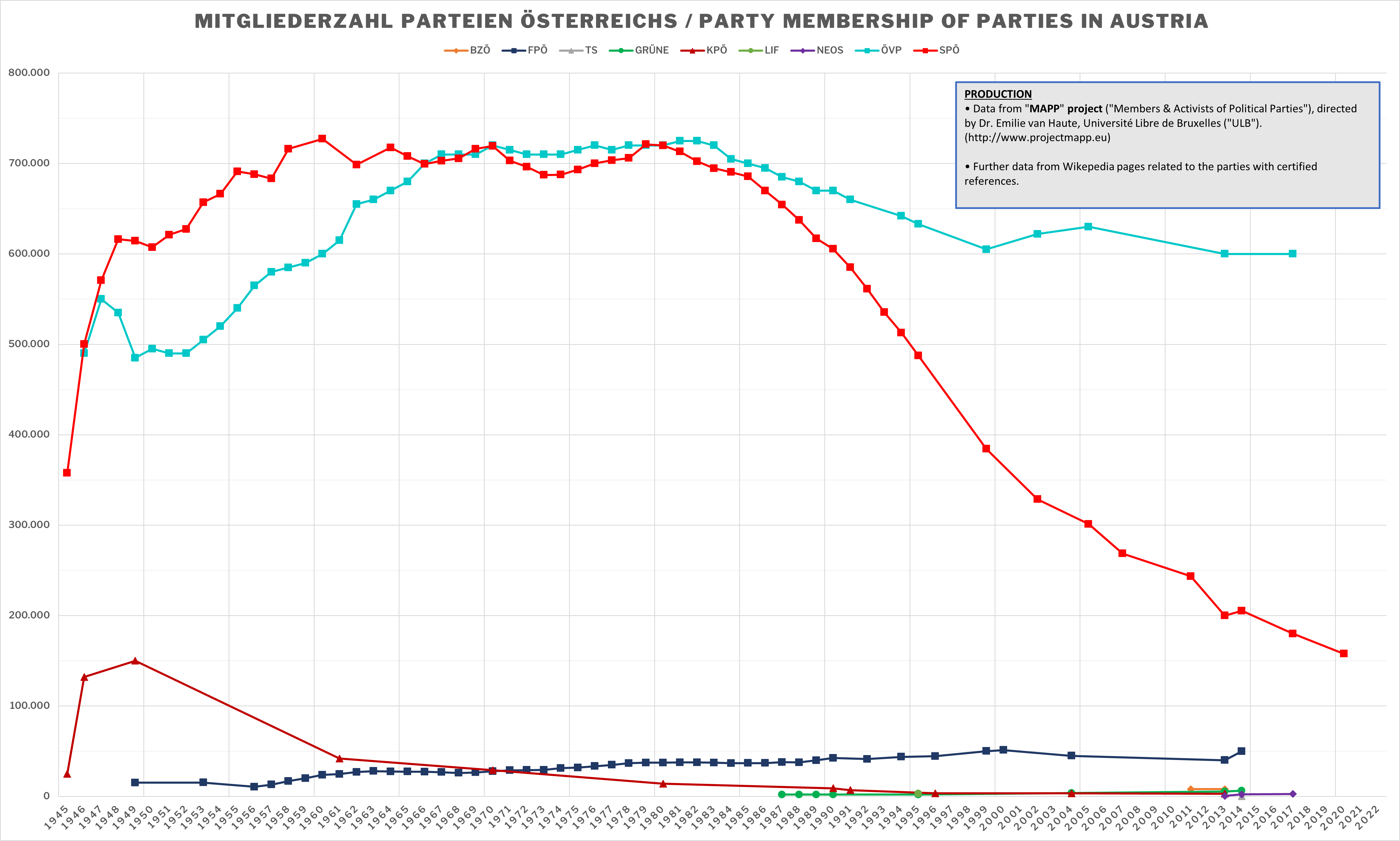
Party membership of ÖVP (in turquoise), since 1945

In the 1945 Austrian legislative election, the ÖVP won a landslide victory in Austria's first postwar election, winning almost half the popular vote and an absolute majority in the legislature. However, memories of the hyper-partisanship that had plagued the First Republic prompted the ÖVP to maintain the grand coalition with the Communist Party of Austria (KPÖ) and the Social Democratic Party of Austria (SPÖ) that had governed the country since the restoration of independence in early 1945. The ÖVP remained the senior partner in a coalition with the SPÖ until 1966 and governed alone from 1966 to 1970. It reentered the government in 1986, but has never been completely out of power since the restoration of Austrian independence in 1945 due to a longstanding tradition that all major interest groups were to be consulted on policy.

After the 1999 Austrian legislative election, several months of negotiations ended in early 2000 when the ÖVP formed a coalition government with the right-wing populist Freedom Party of Austria (FPÖ) led by Jörg Haider. The FPÖ had won just a few hundred more votes than the ÖVP, but was considered far too controversial to lead a government. The ÖVP's Wolfgang Schüssel became Chancellor—the first ÖVP Chancellor of Austria since 1970. This caused widespread outrage in Europe and the European Union imposed informal diplomatic sanctions on Austria, the first time that it imposed sanctions on a member state. Bilateral relations were frozen (including contacts and meetings at an inter-governmental level) and Austrian candidates would not be supported for posts in European Union international offices. Austria threatened to veto all applications by countries for European Union membership until the sanctions were lifted. A few months later, these sanctions were dropped as a result of a fact-finding mission by three former European prime ministers, the so-called "three wise men". The 2002 legislative election resulted in a landslide victory (42.27% of the vote) for the ÖVP under Schüssel. Haider's FPÖ was reduced to 10.16% of the vote. At the state level, the ÖVP has long dominated the rural states of Lower Austria, Upper Austria, Salzburg, Styria, Tyrol and Vorarlberg. It is less popular in the city-state of Vienna and in the rural, but less strongly Catholic states of Burgenland and Carinthia. In 2004, it lost its plurality in the State of Salzburg, where they kept its result in seats (14) in 2009. In 2005, it lost its plurality in Styria for the first time.

After the Alliance for the Future of Austria (BZÖ) split from the FPÖ in 2005, the BZÖ replaced the FPÖ in the government coalition which lasted until 2007. Austria for the first time had a government containing a party that was founded during the parliamentary term. In the 2006 Austrian legislative election, the ÖVP were defeated and after much negotiations agreed to become junior partner in a grand coalition with the SPÖ, with new party chairman Wilhelm Molterer as Finance Minister and Vice-Chancellor under SPÖ leader Alfred Gusenbauer, who became Chancellor. The 2008 Austrian legislative election saw the ÖVP lose 15 seats, with a further 8.35% decrease in its share of the vote. However, the ÖVP won the largest share of the vote (30.0%) in the 2009 European Parliament election with 846,709 votes, although their number of seats remained the same.

The ÖVP had minor losses in the 2013 Austrian legislative election, and the grand coalition with the SPÖ continued until the 2017 Austrian legislative election, when the ÖVP changed its colour to turquoise and won its first legislative election since 2002. The party underwent a change in its image after Sebastian Kurz became chairman, changing its colour from the traditional black to turquoise, and adopting the alternate name The New People's Party (German: Die neue Volkspartei). It became the largest party after the 2017 election, and formed a coalition government with the FPÖ. This collapsed eighteen months later due to the Ibiza affair, leading to the 2019 election, after which the ÖVP formed a new coalition with The Greens.

An investigation into the Ibiza affair by a parliamentary subcommittee, an unstable Cabinet plagued by resignations, and ultimately a corruption inquiry, forced Kurz to resign the chancellorship in October 2021. Kurz was replaced by Karl Nehammer in 2021 as party leader and Chancellor. In the 2024 legislative election, the party fell to second behind the FPÖ. Following the surge of the FPÖ in various polls throughout late 2024 and early 2025, as well as the collapse of the ÖVP-SPÖ-NEOS coalition talks, Nehammer resigned as party leader and was replaced with Christian Stocker as acting leader. After failed talks with the FPÖ, the party would eventually form a coalition with the SPÖ and NEOS, with Stocker as Chancellor.

== Ideology and platform ==
The ÖVP is described as Christian democratic, conservative, and liberal-conservative. The party has also been described as a catch-all party of the centre-right, in the vein of the Christian Democratic Union of Germany. For most of its existence, the ÖVP has explicitly defined itself as Catholic and anti-socialist, with the ideals of subsidiarity as defined by the encyclical Quadragesimo anno and decentralisation.

For the first election after World War II, the ÖVP presented itself as the Austrian Party (German: die österreichische Partei), was anti-Marxist and regarded itself as the Party of the centre (German: Partei der Mitte). The ÖVP consistently held power—either alone or in so-called black–red coalition with the Social Democratic Party of Austria (SPÖ)—until 1970, when the SPÖ formed a minority government with the Freedom Party of Austria (FPÖ). The ÖVP's economic policies during the era generally upheld a social market economy.

The party's campaign for the 2017 legislative election under the party chairman Sebastian Kurz was dominated by a rightward shift in policy which included a promised crackdown on illegal immigration and a fight against political Islam, making it more similar to the program of the FPÖ, the party that Kurz chose as his coalition partner after the ÖVP won the election. The party underwent a change in its image after Kurz became chairman, changing its colour from the traditional black to turquoise, and adopting the name The new People's Party (German: Die neue Volkspartei).

== Organization ==
=== Symbols ===
Logo used in the 1980s

Logo before 2017

Logo with flag before 2017

Party logo (2017–2022)

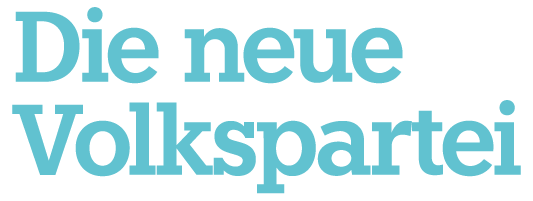
Turquoise variant of the party logo (2017–2022)

Party logo since 2022

=== Chairpersons since 1945 ===
The chart below shows a timeline of ÖVP chairpersons and the Chancellors of Austria. The left black bar shows all the chairpersons (Bundesparteiobleute, abbreviated as CP) of the ÖVP party and the right bar shows the corresponding make-up of the Austrian government at that time. The red (SPÖ) and black (ÖVP) colours correspond to which party led the federal government (Bundesregierung, abbreviated as Govern.). The last names of the respective Chancellors are shown, with the Roman numeral standing for the cabinets.

== Election results ==
=== National Council ===
| Election | Leader | Votes | % | Seats | +/– | Government |
|---|---|---|---|---|---|---|
| 1945 | Leopold Figl | 1,602,227 | 49.80 (#1) | 85 / 165 | New | ÖVP–SPÖ–KPÖ majority |
| 1949 | Leopold Figl | 1,846,581 | 44.03 (#1) | 77 / 165 | ▼8 | ÖVP–SPÖ majority |
| 1953 | Leopold Figl | 1,781,777 | 41.26 (#2) | 74 / 165 | ▼3 | ÖVP–SPÖ majority |
| 1956 | Julius Raab | 1,999,986 | 45.96 (#1) | 82 / 165 | ▲8 | ÖVP–SPÖ majority |
| 1959 | Julius Raab | 1,928,043 | 44.19 (#2) | 79 / 165 | ▼3 | ÖVP–SPÖ majority |
| 1962 | Alfons Gorbach | 2,024,501 | 45.43 (#1) | 81 / 165 | ▲2 | ÖVP–SPÖ majority |
| 1966 | Josef Klaus | 2,191,109 | 48.35 (#1) | 85 / 165 | ▲4 | ÖVP majority |
| 1970 | Josef Klaus | 2,051,012 | 44.69 (#2) | 78 / 165 | ▼7 | Opposition |
| 1971 | Hermann Withalm | 1,964,713 | 43.11 (#2) | 80 / 183 | ▲2 | Opposition |
| 1975 | Josef Taus | 1,981,291 | 42.95 (#2) | 80 / 183 | 0 | Opposition |
| 1979 | Josef Taus | 1,981,739 | 41.90 (#2) | 77 / 183 | ▼3 | Opposition |
| 1983 | Alois Mock | 2,097,808 | 43.22 (#2) | 81 / 183 | ▲4 | Opposition |
| 1986 | Alois Mock | 2,003,663 | 41.29 (#2) | 77 / 183 | ▼4 | SPÖ–ÖVP majority |
| 1990 | Josef Riegler | 1,508,600 | 32.06 (#2) | 60 / 183 | ▼17 | SPÖ–ÖVP majority |
| 1994 | Erhard Busek | 1,281,846 | 27.67 (#2) | 52 / 183 | ▼8 | SPÖ–ÖVP majority |
| 1995 | Wolfgang Schüssel | 1,370,510 | 28.29 (#2) | 52 / 183 | 0 | SPÖ–ÖVP majority |
| 1999 | Wolfgang Schüssel | 1,243,672 | 26.91 (#3) | 52 / 183 | 0 | ÖVP–FPÖ majority |
| 2002 | Wolfgang Schüssel | 2,076,833 | 42.30 (#1) | 79 / 183 | ▲27 | ÖVP–FPÖ majority |
| 2006 | Wolfgang Schüssel | 1,616,493 | 34.33 (#2) | 66 / 183 | ▼13 | SPÖ–ÖVP majority |
| 2008 | Wilhelm Molterer | 1,269,656 | 25.98 (#2) | 51 / 183 | ▼15 | SPÖ–ÖVP majority |
| 2013 | Michael Spindelegger | 1,125,876 | 23.99 (#2) | 47 / 183 | ▼4 | SPÖ–ÖVP majority |
| 2017 | Sebastian Kurz | 1,341,930 | 31.47 (#1) | 62 / 183 | ▲15 | ÖVP–FPÖ majority |
| 2019 | Sebastian Kurz | 1,789,417 | 37.46 (#1) | 71 / 183 | ▲9 | ÖVP–GRÜNE majority |
| 2024 | Karl Nehammer | 1,246,676 | 26.27 (#2) | 52 / 183 | ▼19 | ÖVP–SPÖ–NEOS majority |

=== President ===
| Election | Candidate | First round | | | Second round | | |
| Election | Candidate | Votes | % | Result | Votes | % | Result |
|---|---|---|---|---|---|---|---|
| 1951 | Heinrich Gleißner | 1,725,451 | 40.1 | Runner-up | 2,006,322 | 47.9 | Lost |
| 1957 | Wolfgang Denk | 2,159,604 | 48.9 | Lost | | | |
| 1963 | Julius Raab | 1,814,125 | 40.6 | Lost | | | |
| 1965 | Alfons Gorbach | 2,324,436 | 49.3 | Lost | | | |
| 1971 | Kurt Waldheim | 2,224,809 | 47.2 | Lost | | | |
| 1974 | Alois Lugger | 2,238,470 | 48.3 | Lost | | | |
| 1980 | No candidate | | | | | | |
| 1986 | Kurt Waldheim | 2,343,463 | 49.6 | Won | 2,464,787 | 53.9 | Won |
| 1992 | Thomas Klestil | 1,728,234 | 37.2 | Runner-up | 2,528,006 | 56.9 | Won |
| 1998 | Thomas Klestil | 2,644,034 | 63.4 | Won | | | |
| 2004 | Benita Ferrero-Waldner | 1,969,326 | 47.6 | Lost | | | |
| 2010 | No candidate | | | | | | |
| 2016 | Andreas Khol | 475,767 | 11.1 | 5th place | | | |
| 2022 | No candidate | | | | | | |

=== European Parliament ===
| Election | List leader | Votes | % | Seats | +/– | EP Group |
|---|---|---|---|---|---|---|
| 1996 | Ursula Stenzel | 1,124,921 | 29.65 (#1) | 7 / 21 | New | EPP |
| 1999 | Ursula Stenzel | 859,175 | 30.67 (#2) | 7 / 21 | 0 | EPP |
| 2004 | Ursula Stenzel | 817,716 | 32.70 (#2) | 6 / 18 | ▼1 | EPP-ED |
| 2009 | Ernst Strasser | 858,921 | 29.98 (#1) | 6 / 17 | 0 | EPP |
| 2014 | Othmar Karas | 761,896 | 26.98 (#1) | 5 / 18 | ▼1 | EPP |
| 2019 | Othmar Karas | 1,305,954 | 34.55 (#1) | 7 / 18 | ▲2 | EPP |
| 2024 | Reinhold Lopatka | 864,072 | 24.52 (#2) | 5 / 20 | ▼2 | EPP |

=== State Parliaments ===
| State | Leader | Year | Votes | % | Seats | +/– | Government |
|---|---|---|---|---|---|---|---|
| Burgenland | Christian Sagartz | 2025 | 42,923 | 22.0 (#3) | 8 / 36 | ▼3 | Opposition |
| Carinthia | Martin Gruber | 2023 | 51,637 | 17.0 (#3) | 7 / 36 | ▲1 | SPÖ–ÖVP |
| Lower Austria | Johanna Mikl-Leitner | 2023 | 359,194 | 39.9 (#1) | 23 / 56 | ▼6 | ÖVP–FPÖ |
| Salzburg | Wilfried Haslauer | 2023 | 81,752 | 30.4 (#1) | 12 / 36 | ▼3 | ÖVP–FPÖ |
| Styria | Manuela Khom | 2024 | 177,580 | 26.8 (#2) | 13 / 48 | ▼5 | FPÖ–ÖVP |
| Tyrol | Anton Mattle | 2022 | 119,167 | 34.7 (#1) | 14 / 36 | ▼3 | ÖVP–SPÖ |
| Upper Austria | Thomas Stelzer | 2021 | 303,835 | 37.6 (#1) | 22 / 56 | ▲1 | ÖVP–FPÖ |
| Vienna | Markus Figl | 2025 | 63,050 | 9.71 (#5) | 22 / 100 | ▼ | Opposition |
| Vorarlberg | Markus Wallner | 2024 | 70,638 | 38.3 (#1) | 15 / 36 | ▼2 | ÖVP–FPÖ |

=== Results Timeline ===
| Year | (Austria) Pres. | (Austria) NR | (European Union) EU | (Burgenland) Bgld | (Carinthia) Ktn | (Lower Austria) NÖ | (Salzburg (state)) Sbg | (Styria) Stmk | (Tyrol (federal state)) Tyrol | (Upper Austria) OÖ | (Vienna) Wien | (Vorarlberg) Vbg |
|---|---|---|---|---|---|---|---|---|---|---|---|---|
| 1945 | Indirect | 44.6 | N/A | 51.8 | 39.8 | 54.5 | **56.7** | 53.0 | **69.8** | **59.1** | 34.9 | **70.2** |
| 1946 | Indirect | | N/A | 51.8 | Proporz | 54.5 | **56.7** | 53.0 | **69.8** | **59.1** | | |
| 1947 | Indirect | | N/A | 51.8 | Proporz | 54.5 | **56.7** | 53.0 | **69.8** | **59.1** | | |
| 1948 | Indirect | | N/A | 51.8 | Proporz | 54.5 | **56.7** | 53.0 | **69.8** | **59.1** | | |
| 1949 | Indirect | ▼44.0 | N/A | ▲**52.6** | ▼31.9 | ▼52.5 | ▼43.6 | ▼42.9 | ▼56.4 | ▼44.9 | ▲**34.9** | ▼56.4 |
| 1950 | Indirect | | N/A | ▲**52.6** | Proporz | ▼52.5 | ▼43.6 | ▼42.9 | ▼56.4 | ▼44.9 | | |
| 1951 | 40.1 (R1); 47.9 (R2) | | N/A | ▲**52.6** | Proporz | ▼52.5 | ▼43.6 | ▼42.9 | ▼56.4 | ▼44.9 | | |
| 1952 | W | | N/A | ▲**52.6** | Proporz | ▼52.5 | ▼43.6 | ▼42.9 | ▼56.4 | ▼44.9 | | |
| 1953 | W | ▼41.3 | N/A | ▼48.4 | ▼28.5 | ▼52.5 | ▼43.6 | ▼40.7 | ▲57.7 | ▼44.9 | | |
| 1954 | W | | N/A | ▼48.4 | Proporz | ▼50.7 | ▲45.9 | ▼40.7 | ▲57.7 | ▼44.9 | ▼33.2 | ▲58.0 |
| 1955 | W | | N/A | ▼48.4 | Proporz | ▼50.7 | ▲45.9 | ▼40.7 | ▲57.7 | ▲48.1 | | |
| 1956 | W | ▲**49.2** | N/A | ▲49.2 | ▲32.7 | ▼50.7 | ▲45.9 | ▼40.7 | ▲57.7 | ▲48.1 | | |
| 1957 | ▲48.9 (R1) (Note: Joint candidate with the FPÖ.) | | N/A | ▲49.2 | Proporz | ▼50.7 | ▲45.9 | ▲46.4 | ▲59.3 | ▲48.1 | | |
| 1958 | | | N/A | ▲49.2 | Proporz | ▼50.7 | ▲45.9 | ▲46.4 | ▲59.3 | ▲48.1 | | |
| 1959 | | ▼44.2 | N/A | ▲49.2 | Proporz | ▲50.9 | ▼43.3 | ▲46.4 | ▲59.3 | ▲48.1 | ▼32.4 | ▼54.7 |
| 1960 | | | N/A | ▼48.2 | ▲33.3 | ▲50.9 | ▼43.3 | ▲46.4 | ▲59.3 | ▲48.1 | | |
| 1961 | | | N/A | ▼48.2 | Proporz | ▲50.9 | ▼43.3 | ▲47.1 | ▲59.6 | ▲48.8 | | |
| 1962 | | ▲45.4 | N/A | ▼48.2 | Proporz | ▲50.9 | ▼43.3 | ▲47.1 | ▲59.6 | ▲48.8 | | |
| 1963 | ▼40.6 (R1) | | N/A | ▼48.2 | Proporz | ▲50.9 | ▼43.3 | ▲47.1 | ▲59.6 | ▲48.8 | | |
| 1964 | | | N/A | ▼47.3 | Proporz | ▲51.7 | ▲44.9 | ▲47.1 | ▲59.6 | ▲48.8 | ▲33.8 | ▼53.5 |
| 1965 | ▲49.3 (R1) | | N/A | Proporz | ▼32.9 | ▲51.7 | ▲44.9 | ▲48.4 | ▲63.5 | ▲48.8 | | |
| 1966 | | ▲48.3 | N/A | Proporz | Proporz | ▲51.7 | ▲44.9 | ▲48.4 | ▲63.5 | ▲48.8 | | |
| 1967 | | | N/A | Proporz | Proporz | ▲51.7 | ▲44.9 | ▲48.4 | ▲63.5 | ▼45.2 | | |
| 1968 | | | N/A | ▼46.6 | Proporz | ▲51.7 | ▲44.9 | ▲48.4 | ▲63.5 | ▼45.2 | | |
| 1969 | | | N/A | Proporz | Proporz | ▼50.4 | ▼40.7 | ▲48.4 | ▲63.5 | ▼45.2 | ▼27.7 | ▼50.0 |
| 1970 | | ▼44.7 | N/A | Proporz | ▼32.5 | ▼50.4 | ▼40.7 | ▲48.6 | ▼60.5 | ▼45.2 | | |
| 1971 | ▼47.2 (R1) | ▼43.1 | N/A | Proporz | Proporz | ▼50.4 | ▼40.7 | ▲48.6 | ▼60.5 | ▼45.2 | | |
| 1972 | | ▼43.1 | N/A | ▼45.9 | Proporz | ▼50.4 | ▼40.7 | ▲48.6 | ▼60.5 | ▼45.2 | | |
| 1973 | | ▼43.1 | N/A | Proporz | Proporz | ▼50.4 | ▼40.7 | ▲48.6 | ▼60.5 | ▲47.7 | ▲29.3 | |
| 1974 | ▲48.3 (R1) | ▼43.1 | N/A | Proporz | Proporz | ▲52.1 | ▲47.2 | ▲**53.3** | ▼60.5 | ▲47.7 | ▲29.3 | ▲56.9 |
| 1975 | | ▼42.9 | N/A | Proporz | ▼32.4 | ▲52.1 | ▲47.2 | ▲**53.3** | ▲61.2 | ▲47.7 | ▲29.3 | |
| 1976 | | ▼42.9 | N/A | Proporz | Proporz | ▲52.1 | ▲47.2 | ▲**53.3** | ▲61.2 | ▲47.7 | ▲29.3 | |
| 1977 | | ▼42.9 | N/A | ▼45.1 | Proporz | ▲52.1 | ▲47.2 | ▲**53.3** | ▲61.2 | ▲47.7 | ▲29.3 | |
| 1978 | | ▼42.9 | N/A | Proporz | Proporz | ▲52.1 | ▲47.2 | ▼51.9 | ▲61.2 | ▲47.7 | ▲33.8 | |
| 1979 | | ▼41.9 | N/A | Proporz | ▼31.2 | ▼49.6 | ▼45.4 | ▼51.9 | ▲62.8 | ▲51.6 | ▲33.8 | ▲57.5 |
| 1980 | Did not stand | ▼41.9 | N/A | Proporz | Proporz | ▼49.6 | ▼45.4 | ▼51.9 | ▲62.8 | ▲51.6 | ▲33.8 | |
| 1981 | Did not stand | ▼41.9 | N/A | Proporz | Proporz | ▼49.6 | ▼45.4 | ▼50.9 | ▲62.8 | ▲51.6 | ▲33.8 | |
| 1982 | Did not stand | ▼41.9 | N/A | ▼43.0 | Proporz | ▼49.6 | ▼45.4 | ▼50.9 | ▲62.8 | ▲51.6 | ▲33.8 | |
| 1983 | Did not stand | ▲43.2 | N/A | Proporz | Proporz | ▲**54.6** | ▼45.4 | ▼50.9 | ▲62.8 | ▲51.6 | ▲34.8 | |
| 1984 | Did not stand | ▲43.2 | N/A | Proporz | ▼28.3 | ▲**54.6** | ▲50.2 | ▼50.9 | ▲64.6 | ▲51.6 | ▲34.8 | ▼51.6 |
| 1985 | Did not stand | ▲43.2 | N/A | Proporz | Proporz | ▲**54.6** | ▲50.2 | ▼50.9 | ▲64.6 | ▲52.1 | ▲34.8 | |
| 1986 | ▲49.6 (R1) ▲53.9 (R2) | ▼41.3 | N/A | Proporz | Proporz | ▲**54.6** | ▲50.2 | ▲51.8 | ▲64.6 | ▲52.1 | ▲34.8 | |
| 1987 | W | | N/A | ▼41.5 | Proporz | ▲**54.6** | ▲50.2 | ▲51.8 | ▲64.6 | ▲52.1 | ▼28.4 | |
| 1988 | W | | N/A | Proporz | Proporz | ▼47.6 | ▲50.2 | ▲51.8 | ▲64.6 | ▲52.1 | ▼28.4 | |
| 1989 | W | | N/A | Proporz | ▼21.0 | ▼47.6 | ▼44.0 | ▲51.8 | ▼48.7 | ▲52.1 | ▼28.4 | ▼51.0 |
| 1990 | W | ▼32.1 | N/A | Proporz | ▼21.0 | ▼47.6 | ▼44.0 | ▲51.8 | ▼48.7 | ▲52.1 | ▼28.4 | |
| 1991 | W | | N/A | ▼38.2 | | ▼47.6 | ▼44.0 | ▼44.2 | ▼48.7 | ▼45.2 | ▼18.1 | |
| 1992 | ▼49.6 (R1) ▲**56.9 (R2)** | | N/A | Proporz | | ▼47.6 | ▼44.0 | ▼44.2 | ▼48.7 | ▼45.2 | ▼18.1 | |
| 1993 | W | | N/A | Proporz | | ▼44.2 | ▼44.0 | ▼44.2 | ▼48.7 | ▼45.2 | ▼18.1 | |
| 1994 | W | ▼27.7 | N/A | Proporz | ▲23.8 | ▼44.2 | ▼38.6 | ▼44.2 | ▼47.3 | ▼45.2 | ▼18.1 | ▼49.9 |
| 1995 | W | ▲28.3 | N/A | Proporz | ▲23.8 | ▼44.2 | ▼38.6 | ▼36.3 | ▼47.3 | ▼45.2 | ▼18.1 | |
| 1996 | W | | 29.7 | ▼36.1 | ▲23.8 | ▼44.2 | ▼38.6 | ▼36.3 | ▼47.3 | ▼45.2 | ▼15.3 | |
| 1997 | W | | 29.7 | Proporz | ▲23.8 | ▼44.2 | ▼38.6 | ▼36.3 | ▼47.3 | ▼42.7 | | |
| 1998 | ▲**63.4 (R1)** | | 29.7 | Proporz | ▲23.8 | ▲44.9 | ▼38.6 | ▼36.3 | ▼47.3 | | | |
| 1999 | | ▼26.9 | ▲30.7 | Proporz | ▼20.5 | ▲44.9 | ▲38.8 | ▼36.3 | ▼47.2 | | | ▼45.8 |
| 2000 | | | ▲30.7 | ▼35.3 | Proporz | ▲44.9 | | ▲47.3 | | | | |
| 2001 | | | ▲30.7 | Proporz | Proporz | ▲44.9 | | ▲47.3 | | | ▲16.4 | |
| 2002 | | ▲42.3 | ▲30.7 | Proporz | Proporz | ▲44.9 | | ▲47.3 | | | ▲16.4 | |
| 2003 | | | ▲30.7 | Proporz | Proporz | ▲53.3 | | ▲47.3 | ▲49.9 | ▲43.4 | ▲16.4 | |
| 2004 | ▼47.6 (R1) | | ▲32.7 | Proporz | ▼11.6 | ▲53.3 | ▼37.9 | ▲47.3 | | | ▲16.4 | ▲54.9 |
| 2005 | | | ▲32.7 | ▲36.4 | Proporz | ▲53.3 | | ▼38.7 | | | ▲18.8 | |
| 2006 | | ▼34.3 | ▲32.7 | Proporz | Proporz | ▲53.3 | | Proporz | | | ▲18.8 | |
| 2007 | | | ▲32.7 | Proporz | Proporz | ▲53.3 | | Proporz | | | ▲18.8 | |
| 2008 | | ▼26.0 | ▲32.7 | Proporz | Proporz | ▲54.4 | | Proporz | ▼40.5 | | ▲18.8 | |
| 2009 | | | ▼30.0 | Proporz | ▲16.8 | ▲54.4 | ▼36.5 | Proporz | | ▲46.8 | ▲18.8 | ▼50.8 |
| 2010 | Did not stand | | ▼30.0 | ▼34.6 | Proporz | ▲54.4 | | ▼37.2 | | | ▼14.0 | |
| 2011 | Did not stand | | ▼30.0 | Proporz | Proporz | ▲54.4 | | Proporz | | | ▼14.0 | |
| 2012 | Did not stand | | ▼30.0 | Proporz | Proporz | ▲54.4 | | Proporz | | | ▼14.0 | |
| 2013 | Did not stand | ▼24.0 | ▼30.0 | Proporz | ▼14.4 | ▼50.8 | ▼29.0 | Proporz | ▼39.4 | | ▼14.0 | |
| 2014 | Did not stand | | ▼27.0 | Proporz | Proporz | ▼50.8 | | Proporz | | | ▼14.0 | ▼41.8 |
| 2015 | Did not stand | | ▼27.0 | ▼29.1 | Proporz | ▼50.8 | | ▼28.5 | | ▼36.3 | ▼9.2 | |
| 2016 | ▼11.1 (R1) | | ▼27.0 | ▼29.1 | Proporz | ▼50.8 | | | | | ▼9.2 | |
| 2017 | W | ▲31.5 | ▼27.0 | ▼29.1 | Proporz | ▼50.8 | | | | | ▼9.2 | |
| 2018 | W | | ▼27.0 | ▼29.1 | ▲15.5 | ▼49.6 | ▲38.8 | | ▲44.3 | | ▼9.2 | |
| 2019 | W | ▲37.5 | ▲**34.6** | ▼29.1 | | ▼49.6 | | ▲36.0 | | | ▼9.2 | ▲43.5 |
| 2020 | W | | ▲**34.6** | ▲30.6 | | ▼49.6 | | | | | ▲20.4 | |
| 2021 | W | | ▲**34.6** | ▲30.6 | | ▼49.6 | | | | ▲37.6 | ▲20.4 | |
| 2022 | Did not stand | | ▲**34.6** | ▲30.6 | | ▼49.6 | | | ▼34.7 | | ▲20.4 | |
| 2023 | Did not stand | | ▲**34.6** | ▲30.6 | ▲17.0 | ▼39.9 | ▼30.4 | | | | ▲20.4 | |
| 2024 | Did not stand | ▼26.3 | ▼24.5 | ▲30.6 | | | | ▼26.8 | | | ▲20.4 | ▼38.3 |
| 2025 | Did not stand | | ▼24.5 | ▼21.2 | | | | | | | ▼9.7 | |
| Year | (Austria) Pres. | (Austria) NR | (European Union) EU | (Burgenland) Bgld | (Carinthia) Ktn | (Lower Austria) NÖ | (Salzburg (state)) Sbg | (Styria) Stmk | (Tyrol (federal state)) Tyrol | (Upper Austria) OÖ | (Vienna) Wien | (Vorarlberg) Vbg |
**Bold** indicates best result to date. Present in legislature (in opposition) / Present in presidential first round Junior coalition partner / Present in presidential second round Senior coalition partner / Presidential winner

== See also ==
- Politics of Austria
