= Julius Raab =

Chancellor of Austria from 1953 to 1961

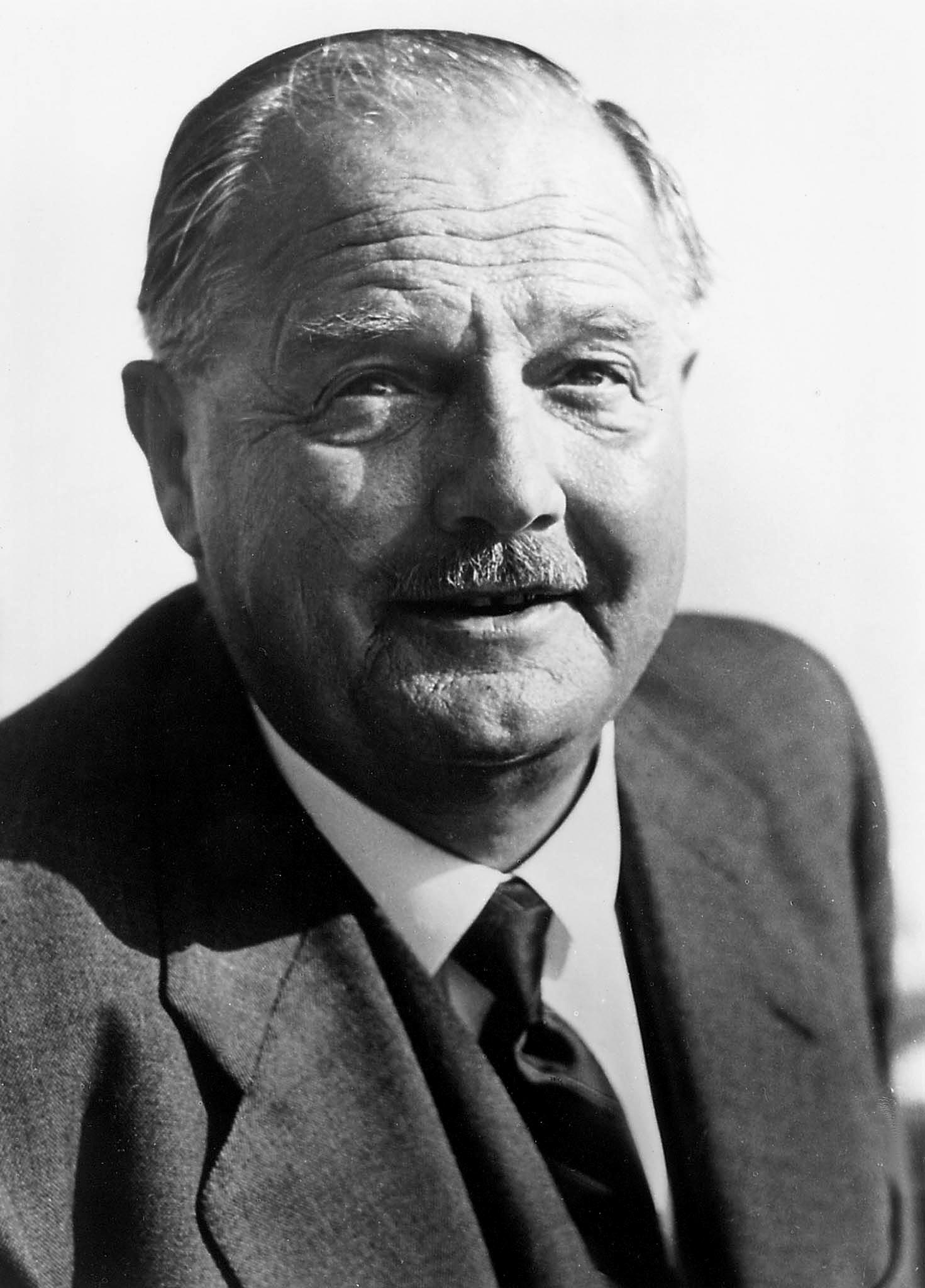
- Raab in 1961

Chancellor of Austria
- In office 2 April 1953 – 11 April 1961
- President: Theodor Körner; Adolf Schärf
- Vice-Chancellor: Adolf Schärf; Bruno Pittermann
- Preceded by: Leopold Figl
- Succeeded by: Alfons Gorbach

President of the Federal Chamber of Commerce
- In office 26 May 1961 – 8 January 1964
- Preceded by: Franz Dworak
- Succeeded by: Rudolf Sallinger
- In office 10 December 1946 – 18 April 1953
- Preceded by: Office established
- Succeeded by: Franz Dworak

Minister for Public Buildings, Economic Transition and Reconstruction
- In office 27 April 1945 – 20 December 1945
- Chancellor: Karl Renner
- Preceded by: Office established
- Succeeded by: Office abolished

Minister of Commerce and Transport
- In office 16 February 1938 – 11 March 1938
- Chancellor: Kurt Schuschnigg
- Preceded by: Wilhelm Taucher
- Succeeded by: Hans Fischböck

Personal details
- Born: 29 November 1891 Sankt Pölten, Lower Austria, Austria-Hungary
- Died: 8 January 1964 (aged 72) Vienna, Austria
- Party: People's Party (1945–1964)
- Other political affiliations: Christian Social Party (1927–1934); Fatherland Front (1934–1938)
- Education: Vienna University of Technology
- Profession: Civil engineer

Julius Raab (29 November 1891 – 8 January 1964) was an Austrian politician who served as Federal Chancellor of Austria from 1953 to 1961. Raab steered Allied-occupied Austria to independence, when he negotiated and signed the Austrian State Treaty in 1955. In internal politics Raab stood for a pragmatic "social partnership" and the "Grand coalition" of Austrian Conservatives and Social Democrats.

== Biography ==
Raab was born into a middle-class Catholic family in Sankt Pölten, Lower Austria, the son of a master builder. He attended a Catholic high school and in 1911 enrolled at the Vienna University of Technology to study civil engineering. He was drafted into the Austro-Hungarian Army as a pioneer officer before graduation and fought on the Russian and Italian fronts of World War I. After the defeat of Central Powers Raab returned to the university and engaged in politics. On 14 January 1923, Raab married Harmine Haumer.

The death of his father and the beginning of his political career in the First Austrian Republic compelled Raab to drop out of the university in 1925. From 1927 to 1934 he was a member of the National Council parliament as a Lower Austrian deputy of the Christian Social Party. Backed by Chancellor Ignaz Seipel, he was also active in the Heimwehr paramilitary arm of right-wing political forces, and was appointed chief for Lower Austria in 1928. However, his attempts to bind the paramilitary forces to the Christian Social Party ultimately failed. In 1932 he joined the Catholic Ostmärkische Sturmscharen forces led by his party fellows Kurt Schuschnigg and Leopold Figl. In 1933 Raab joined the Fatherland's Front, the newly established right-wing coalition led by Chancellor Engelbert Dollfuss. During the austrofascist period of 1934–1938 Raab progressed through the ranks of the Corporate State, and was appointed Minister of Commerce by Chancellor Schuschnigg just four weeks before the 1938 Anschluss to Nazi Germany.

Raab was ousted after the Anschluss but, unlike many other Austrian political leaders, escaped death or imprisonment through the help of the Lower Austrian Nazi Gauleiter Hugo Jury, whom he knew personally. He was never involved in the Austrian resistance but kept in touch with the old Christian Democrat elite and supported his fellow Leopold Figl after his release from imprisonment.

In April 1945, Raab was made a member of Karl Renner's provisional government, formed in the Soviet zone of occupation in Austria. Raab co-founded the conservative Austrian People's Party (ÖVP), which denounced the dark legacy of the 1930s, and assumed leadership of ÖVP parliamentary group after the legislative elections held in November 1945. However, he represented the austrofascist forces of the past that were unacceptable to the Soviets, and for a while was "relegated to the back seat". From 1947, he expanded his influence through presidency in the Austrian Federal Economic Chamber, the institution tasked with managing social partnership of the government, the political parties, the entrepreneurs and the employees' trade unions. He clearly favored a free market and minimal government regulation of the economy. On the other hand, Raab also held talks with former Austrian Nazi officials like Wilhelm Höttl and Taras Borodajkewycz on their support for ÖVP politics.

Chancellor Raab (right) meets Vyacheslav Molotov in Moscow in April 1955

Raab succeeded Leopold Figl as ÖVP party chairman in 1951 and as Federal Chancellor in 1953. Despite clearly Western attitudes, Raab established excellent relations with post-Stalin Soviet Union. In February 1955 Vyacheslav Molotov proposed resuming the talks on Austrian independence. On 12 April 1955 Raab, Foreign Minister Leopold Figl and State Secretary Bruno Kreisky arrived in Moscow for the negotiations that paved the way to the Austrian State Treaty concluded in Vienna on 15 May. Austria declared neutrality, as did all individual Bundesländer. The success of 1955 marked the peak of ÖVP influence, accompanied by a strong economic revival (Wirtschaftswunder) and full employment. The party won 46% of the popular vote in the 1956 elections, Raab retained his seat as Federal Chancellor. Despite criticism within the party, Raab strongly favored a tight coalition with the Social Democratic Party under Adolf Schärf. In 1957 he and trade union chief Johann Bohm co-founded the Joint Commission on Wages and Prices, the social partnership institution that became a cornerstone of Austrian corporatism.

In 1957 Raab suffered a light stroke. By the end of the 1950s, his own career and his party's influence declined. In 1961 he passed ÖVP leadership to Alfons Gorbach, who also succeeded him as Federal Chancellor on 11 April. On 28 April 1963 Raab competed in the presidential elections but lost to incumbent Adolf Schärf. His health rapidly deteriorated, and he died, aged 72, in Vienna on 8 January 1964.

== See also ==
- List of members of the Austrian Parliament who died in office

== Notes ==
Political offices
| Preceded by: Leopold Figl | Chancellor of Austria; 1953–1961 | Succeeded by: Alfons Gorbach |
