= Austrian Association of Hiking, Sports and Society =

The Austrian Association of Hiking, Sports and Society (German: Österreichischer Wander-, Sport- und Geselligkeitsverein, abbreviated OeWSGV or ÖWSGV) was a name used to camouflage a secret paramilitary army in Austria which operated from 1951 to 1964. It was founded by the head of the Austrian Trade Union Federation (ÖGB), Franz Olah, to combat communism in Austria. The CIA provided finances and support. The organisation was a part of a network of "stay-behind" organisations left in Europe at the end of World War II as part of the West's Cold War defences.

== History ==
At the end of World War II, Austria was divided into four Allied occupation zones. Rivalry between the Western Allies (the United States, the United Kingdom and France) and the Soviet Union over the future of the newly founded Republic of Austria was increasing. When the Communist Party of Austria (KPÖ) received only 5.5 percent of the votes in the Austrian parliamentary elections of November 1945, the fear that Austria might become a communist ruled nation was lessened. However, Austria's economic status remained doubtful and there remained the risk of workers' strikes and demonstrations that might lead to a communist coup.

In 1947, Johann Böhm, president of the ÖGB and the politician, Franz Olah (1910–2009) secretly formed a group of reliably anti-Communist trade unions leaders. The leadership of the Social Democratic Party of Austria (SPÖ) and the US High Commissioner and Head of the United States Armed Forces in Germany, General Lieutenant Geoffrey Keyes (1888–1967) tacitly accepted the arrangement.

World War II caused extreme deprivation and suffering for the people of Europe. In these socio-economic circumstances, Western leaders warned of Communist expansionism. However, in Austria, the Allies feared that the people, unhappy with food shortages and a large number of refugees in the country, might support a resurgence of National Socialism. The Allies were also hunting for Nazi war criminals on the run. As late as 1947, members of a Werwolf (National Socialist partisans) group were found in Austria.

In 1949, Olah became first secretary of the Austrian Building and Woodworkers Union, whose members were known to be the most influential in the ÖGB. In October 1950, a wave of strikes protesting the Fourth Wages and Prices Agreement broke out. The unrest became a threat to the government of Leopold Figl (1902–1965). It was the union under Olah's leadership and less so the police, who engaged in violent confrontations with and ultimately repressed the strikers in Vienna. The police under the SPÖ Minister of the Interior, Oskar Helmer, remained inactive for fear of political consequences and for fear of invoking Soviet occupation.

Olah was considered a reliable anti-communist within the Austrian trade unions. This is remarkable because while the OeWSGV under Olah would employ socialists and trade unionists, similar entities in other European states were formed by conservatives and nationalists and indeed, some of the middle-class citizens of the Austrian People's Party had close contacts with the CIA in the post-war period.

== Development ==
In 1951, a secret army was raised in order to maintain a fighting force with which the Austrian government could counter any attempt at a Communist coup d'état. The army was camouflaged by the name, the Osterreichischen Wander-, Sport-, und Geselligkeitsverein, the "Austrian Association of Hiking, Sports and Society Club" (or "Hiking, sport, and conviviality union"). Most of the recruits were young working trade union men. The recruits were trained in camps by senior military personnel. They were trained in shooting, in the use of explosives, and in close quarters combat. Weapons were purchased from other armies. Cars were purchased in the name of the club. In Golling an der Salzach near Salzburg, (at that time in the American occupation zone), land was purchased for the mountain and winter training of a 200-man special group. At its largest, the OeWSGV had 2,700 employees.

The extent to which the OeWSGV formed with the initiative or the tolerance of the US occupation authorities is unclear. The CIA provided funding and material support to the OeWSGV, including 8 to 10 million Austrian schillings and modern radio equipment. In emergencies, the OeWSGV was able to make use of the radio infrastructure of the American occupation authorities such as the red-and-white radio masts in Vienna, Linz, and Salzburg.

The CIA's representative in Vienna was John H. Richardson Sr. (1913–1998). He was stationed there from 1948 to 1952. In the Kennedy era, he was the station chief in Saigon.

In 1952, two trading companies were formed: Atlanta and Omnia Warenhandels AG. They were formed to camouflage fund raising for "Sonderprojekt Olah" which in turn, funded the OeWSGV.

In 1953, the Staatspolizei ("StaPo"), the Austrian secret service, under the supervision of Peter Schuller, discovered an OeWSGV station in Trofaiach in the British occupation zone. A letter in the premises linked the station to the Bau und Holz trade union (construction and timber workers union). Oswald Peterlunger, head of the Vienna state police from 1947 to 1966, was a friend of Olah. The detainees from the station were released and their transmitters returned without publicity.

In 1955, at the completion of the Austrian State Treaty, the four occupying powers withdrew and by its own law, Austria became a neutral country. The withdrawal of Soviet forces decreased the risk of Austria becoming a Soviet satellite state.

However, the CIA did not abandon the OeWSGV and maintained similar entities in other NATO countries. They were designed to combat internal communist currents, and to function as "stay-behind" organizations to protect the countries in the event of Soviet attack. Although Austria was neutral and not a NATO member, the OeWSGV was loosely integrated into NATO as part of the Gladio network. In November 1956, Soviet troops entered Hungary. More than 200,000 refugees fled to Austria. NATO assumed some of them might be communist agents and so organisations like the OeWSGV were still required.

== Disbandment ==
In 1959, Olah replaced Böhm as president of the Austrian Federation of Trade Unions. The Federation's political influence was increasing. In 1963, Olah became Minister of the Interior in the government of the Austrian People's Party (ÖVP) Chancellor Alfons Gorbach (1898–1972). As a result, Austria's police services in general were under the influence of StaPo.

After the 1962 Cuban Missile Crisis a policy of relaxed relations between the US and the Soviets was formed. The Austrian democratic system was considered to be so far established that a communist takeover of power was no longer regarded as a realistic scenario. The OeWSGV had thus become more or less obsolete. Olah gradually phased out the organization and had all its documents and bookkeeping destroyed.

== Discovery ==
In 1964, Olah was found to have misappropriated trade union funds to support the Freedom Party of Austria (FPÖ). On 21 September 1964, he resigned. His successor in the Cabinet of Josef Klaus (1910–2001) was Hans Czettel (1923–1980). Olah was expelled from the SPÖ. In 1966, he joined the Democratic Progressive Party (DFP) to contest the National Council elections. His popularity among workers brought votes from the SPÖ to the DFP. (The DFP received just over three percent of votes.) For the first time, the ÖVP gained an absolute majority of seats, albeit a narrow one, and was able to form a majority government under Klaus.

In 1969, Olah was prosecuted for his misappropriation of trade union funds in 1959 when he was president of the ÖGB. Olah had used the money to assist Hans Dichand restart the Kronen Zeitung newspaper. In the course of the prosecution, details of the OeWSGV were published for the first time. Olah defended the OeWSGV as a patriotic measure in the struggle against communism to be judged in the context of the Cold War.

Olah was accused of building a private army. In his defence, he named prominent conscripts. However, they were all men who had died before 1969 and therefore unable to deny or corroborate Olah's defence. They included the former President of Austria, Adolf Schärf (1890–1965); former Minister of the Interior, Oskar Helmer, and former President of the ÖGB, Johann Böhm. Other men connected with the OeWSGV included the trade unionist Karl Flottl, the Viennese SPÖ municipal councillor, Hans Bock and the head of the Chamber of Labor, Franz Horr. Heinrich Daurer was said to be responsible for weapons training and Walter Jeschko for radio training. The American trade unionist, Wesley Cook was said to be the agent for financing the group. Olah was convicted and sentenced to one year's imprisonment. He left Austrian politics for good. At the time, it was Olah's fraudulent activities that caught the public's interest. It was much later, at the end of the Cold War, when the OeWSGV was re-examined in the context of Austria's international relations.

== Investigations ==
Gladio was the name of a secret Cold War paramilitary force in Italy. In 2005, the Swiss historian Daniele Ganser published a comprehensive and scientific review of its network. Projekt-26 was a similar force in Switzerland.

In 1991, Peter Pilz an Austrian Member of Parliament representing the Austrian Green Party, gave a parliamentary question about "activities of the Gladio secret service, or any other NATO-related news service, on Austrian territory". Both the Minister of Defence, Werner Fasslabend and the Minister of the Interior, Franz Löschnak denied the existence of any such army in Austria and denied knowledge of any such party existing in the past.

In 1995, Olah published a book entitled The Memoirs. In it he gave details beyond those revealed in the 1960s.

In 1996, Swanee Hunt, US ambassador to Austria, made public US intelligence documents from the time of the Cold War. During its occupation of Austria, the US created over one hundred secret weapon depots, mostly in areas of impassable or mountainous terrain. It is unclear whether the weapons were for the OeWSGV or for US agents. The Austrian federal government commissioned the historian, Oliver Rathkolb of the University of Vienna, to apply for the publication of further US documents. However, the relevant authorities and the CIA replied that there were none to be had.

In 1965, Austrian gendarmes had discovered a gun depot in a mine near Windisch Bleiberg in Carinthia. This led to British authorities publishing a list of a further 33 weapons stores.

In Austria, verifying contacts between particular men has assisted in determining the sources of finance for the OeWSGV. For example, Olah knew Wesley Cook, who served as a representative of the American Federation of Labor in the Marshall Plan for three years for the Economic Cooperation Administration in Vienna. Another example involves funds donated by Jay Lovestone and Irving Brown, both high-ranking US trade union officials. In 1952, they had worked through the Office of Policy Coordination to make submissions to the CIA.
