= Kreisky–Peter–Wiesenthal affair =

The Kreisky–Peter–Wiesenthal affair was a political and personal feud in the 1970s, fought between the then Austrian chancellor Bruno Kreisky and the Nazi hunter Simon Wiesenthal, arising from Kreisky's ministerial appointments and the SS past of Freedom Party leader Friedrich Peter, which had been revealed by Wiesenthal.

== Political development in Austria in the 1970s ==
Bruno Kreisky's Socialist Party had been ruling Austria since 1970, with an absolute majority since the 1971 general election. In 1975, their re-election was quite unsure, so Kreisky secretly struck a deal with the then liberal centrist Freedom Party's leader Friedrich Peter on building a government together if the socialists failed to achieve an absolute majority of seats in the National Council. This proved unnecessary, however, when Kreisky's party managed to maintain its majority. Simon Wiesenthal, by contrast, was a well-known supporter of the conservative Austrian People's Party.

== Wiesenthal's accusations ==
Kreisky, a Jew who had been persecuted by the Gestapo because of his political beliefs and Jewish birth, and after that spent all of World War II in Sweden, formed his minority government after a close victory in the 1970 election. Wiesenthal soon pointed out that four of his appointed ministers had a Nazi past: Erwin Frühbauer, Josef Moser, Hans Öllinger, and Otto Rösch. One of them, Minister for the Interior Otto Rösch, was even known for neo-Nazi activities after the war. Kreisky publicly defended his appointments, claiming that because of his own past as refugee and political prisoner, he could very well forgive former Nazis if they were democrats now. Wiesenthal replied that "the Nazis could live, the Nazis could die, but they should not govern us."

In 1975, Wiesenthal showed his report to President Rudolf Kirchschläger, who urged him not to publish it before the election, because the Austrian people would see this as a foreign interference in their democracy. Wiesenthal agreed. Four days after the election, however, Wiesenthal revealed what he had found out about Peter's wartime years. His report showed that Peter had been an officer in the SS and had served as Obersturmführer at Infantry regiment 10 of the 1st SS Infantry Brigade. This unit was part of the Einsatzgruppen, which shot hundreds of thousands of Jews in Nazi-occupied Eastern Europe in 1941. Peter, who never denied having been a member of the SS, said that he didn't take part in any mass killings, claiming he was not on duty during the massacres.

== Kreisky attacking Wiesenthal ==
Kreisky supported Peter and said that Wiesenthal was a "crypto-racist" who himself was responsible for antisemitism in Austria. At a party conference, his secretary Leopold Gratz claimed that Wiesenthal was operating a "secret police and surveillance center" and was in no way allowed to defame democratically elected politicians. Kreisky later on said that Wiesenthal "makes a living telling the world that Austria is anti-Semitic. What else can he do?"; he went on to call Wiesenthal a former Gestapo agent, based on Czechoslovak intelligence papers which turned out to be fakes, and wanted a parliamentary investigation of Wiesenthal's Jewish Documentary Center in Vienna. He claimed that Wiesenthal was employing mafia methods.

Austria's two most famous living Jews were therefore publicly at odds about Austria's Nazi past, supporting Israel, and postwar Jewish identity in Austria. The row climaxed in an unsubstantiated allegation that Kreisky had claimed that he "was no longer Jewish," to which Wiesenthal's response was that "the only Austrian who does not believe Kreisky is Jewish is Kreisky himself." In an interview with a Dutch journalist, the chancellor even stated that "the Jews are no people, and if they are they're a lousy people." Kreisky and Heinz Fischer, later president of Austria from 2004 to 2016, considered a parliamentary inquiry on Wiesenthal and his center. Before the 2004 Austrian presidential election, Fischer publicly apologized for his behavior in that context.

== Legal action ==
Initially, Wiesenthal sued the chancellor for slander, but he dropped the case when Kreisky was persuaded by his party colleagues to drop at least part of his allegations, because it did damage to his image abroad. A lead article in the weekly news magazine Profil assessed Kreisky's behavior towards Wiesenthal as immoral and undignified. The author was sued by the Chancellor and found guilty of defamation by Austrian courts; in 1986, the European Court of Human Rights, however, decided unanimously in favor of the journalist for reasons of freedom of speech. The same year, Kreisky renewed his allegations that Wiesenthal was a Gestapo collaborator, three years after leaving office and therefore no longer protected by parliamentary immunity. Wiesenthal sued again and the former Chancellor was found guilty of defamation and had to pay a fine of 270,000 ATS (US$25,000).

== Background ==
Unlike Wiesenthal, who had spent years in Nazi concentration camps and had lost most of his family there, Kreisky felt that he had never personally suffered as a Jew, but only as a socialist. Historians believe that Kreisky's forgiveness and relaxed attitude towards former Nazis dates from his time in the Austrian prisons during the Engelbert Dollfuss regime in 1935. Many of his cellmates were Nazis and he accepted them as fellow political opponents of the Austro-Fascist government. It was one of these former cellmates who arranged Kreisky's escape to Sweden in 1938.

Another factor was that Kreisky was an assimilated Jew from Vienna, who did not practise his faith and had nothing to do with the mostly very poor Eastern Jews that were considered inferior and embarrassing even by most of the Austrian Jews. "The eastern Jews are alien," Kreisky once remarked. That was, however, Wiesenthal's background: He was born in Galicia and raised in a religious household. Kreisky is also alleged to have deliberately used coded antisemitic semantics to attract right-wing voters in Austria.

Both men never spoke to each other again and both felt that they were right about their view about each other. Historian Tom Segev described the affair as triggered by both men's complex personalities: "Vienna was too small a city to hold two Jews with egos of this size, both of whom wished to be part of Austrian society".

== Aftermath ==
The Kreisky–Peter–Wiesenthal affair raised many of the themes that resurfaced a decade later during the controversy around Kurt Waldheim. Waldheim's wartime service in the SS is still shared by part of the Austrian population, and Austrians are also today very critical of foreign interference in their political affairs, which sometimes leads to nationalism and resentment. This political climate supported the rise of Jörg Haider and the Freedom Party in the 1980s and 1990s.
