= 1950 Austrian general strikes =

1950 general strikes in Austria

The Austrian General Strikes of 1950 were organised by the Communist Party of Austria with half-hearted support of the Soviet occupation authorities. From August–October 1950, Austria faced a severe social and economic crisis caused by anticipated withdrawal of American financial aid and a sharp drop in real wages. Negotiations between the government and the trade unions stalled, and on 26 September the Communists launched the first general strike. A total of 120 thousand industrial workers walked out of factories, disrupted railroad traffic, and harassed government officers. The Austrian government, the Socialists, and trade unions defused the situation, and on 27 September, the Communists backed off. The second strike of 4–5 October, limited to Vienna and Soviet-occupied Lower Austria, also ended in a humiliating defeat.

The Soviet support to Austrian Communists was limited to the disruption of police action and provision of trucks for moving communist agents. The British and American occupation forces provided only moral support to the Austrian government. All former allies left use of force. No one was killed but dozens of police officers and civilians were injured in street fights.

The strikes of 1950 are routinely called a putsch but actual goals of the Communists remain unknown. According to contemporary American press, the August strikes were "the most widespread and potentially dangerous since the end of World War II". Historians agreed: "the developing strike was the most dangerous since the end of the war" (Bader), "few Cold War confrontations in Austria were more potentially explosive than the Communist-inspired strikes of September and October 1950" (Williams).

== Crisis of 1950 ==
Allied occupation zones in Austria

After the conclusion of World War II, the territory of Austria, annexed by Nazi Germany in 1938, was once again separated from Germany and placed under administration of France, the Soviet Union, the United Kingdom and the United States. In 1949, they agreed on two-thirds of the draft of the Austrian State Treaty, but its very future was vague, as had been shown by the partition of Germany. By summer of 1950, lack of progress with the Treaty and the communist scare of the Korean War had a grave impact on the Austrians' morale.

Allied-occupied Austria was split into four occupation zones. The Soviet Union controlled the provinces of Lower Austria, Burgenland and eastern districts of Upper Austria, but the city of Vienna, which lies within Lower Austria, was occupied by all four allies. Austrian heavy industry (or what was left of it) concentrated around Linz, in the American zone, and in British-occupied Styria. Their products were in high demand in post-war Europe. Quite naturally, the administrators of the Marshall Plan channelled available financial aid into heavy industry controlled by the American and British forces. Industry quickly recovered, from 74.7% of pre-war output in 1948 to 150.7% in 1951. American planners deliberately neglected consumer goods industries, construction trades and small business. Their workers, almost half of Austrian industrial workforce, suffered from rising unemployment.

Agriculture remained in ruin, and Austria relied on food imports from the West. In 1948–1949 substantial share of Marshall Plan funds allocated to Austria was used to subsidize imports of food. American money, effectively, raised real wages of Austrian workers: grain price in Austria was at about one-third of the world price. Farmers were depressed by artificially low prices; the Americans were not happy about it too and planned to cut off food subsidies by the end of 1950. The Austrian coalition government, chaired by Leopold Figl, was facing an impending social and economic crisis. They had to manage it alone, without Allied support and financial reserves to smooth the transition. Austrian finances were ruined by post-war hyperinflation. From 1947–1949 the government and organized labor maintained real wages through annual adjustment of wages to prices. The first two price-wage agreements relieved social tension, but by the time of the third price-wage agreement (1949), failures of this mechanism were obvious. The Communist Party of Austria made the alleged "ripoff of workers" in 1949 a staple of their campaigning and blamed the very existence of wage-price agreements on American influence.

The fourth price-wage agreement, negotiated in secrecy in August 1950, ended in a deadlock. The unions expected that the government would pick up the food bill previously paid by the Americans. The government could not afford it, and was persuading the unions to accept a sharp drop in real wages. The farmers demanded a raise in food price caps. The Korean War raised worldwide prices of coal, fertilizers, and other vital imported commodities. The public remained unaware of the depth of the crisis altogether until the first week of September when the farmers refused to deliver their produce to the cities at old prices. The coalition government plunged into protracted public debates between different interest groups and failed to reach a consensus. As public anxiety mounted, Austrian Communists, who had recently lost municipal elections, even in the Soviet zone, grabbed the opportunity and demanded a 15% "straight wage increase with prices frozen". On 24 September 1950, the communist press announced the upcoming general strike. In case of a conflict they counted on support from the Werkschutz, the paramilitary factory guard employed by the USIA and composed of communists.

== First strike ==
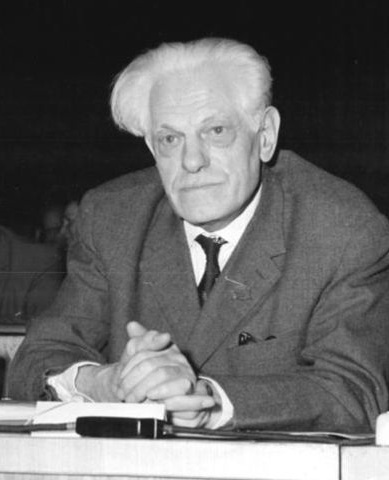
Leader of Austrian Communists Johann Koplenig (1963 photo).

On Tuesday, 26 September 1950, the strike began in earnest. It could have become the greatest challenge to the Second Republic had it been supported by the Soviet Union. In the morning, the communist agents in the Soviet occupation zone in Vienna went from factory to factory, recruiting supporters among disgruntled workers. By 10:00, they mobilized around fifteen thousand demonstrators and marched south into the center of Vienna. According to the French High Commissioner, 99% of them worked in the Soviet zone. Police of the Soviet zone did not interfere, the American High Commission stayed aside, and the Austrian Minister of the Interior deliberately disarmed his forces in fear of Soviet provocations. The crowd of seven thousand pressed its way through police barricades and rallied in front of the Federal Chancellery building at the time of the Cabinet meeting. Figl refused to speak to the demonstrators, and by 13:00 they left the square. No shots were fired but 23 unarmed police officers were wounded in clashes with the workers.

Heavy industry workers in American-occupied Linz and Steyr went on strike in the afternoon. The strike in Linz was supported by both pro-communist workers. Workers in British zone followed suit. In Soviet-occupied Lower Austria strike groups attempted to grab control over railroad stations and post offices, and actually did overran some of the latter. Soviet forces maintained friendly neutrality, although there was one incident of a Soviet tank involved in blocking the railroad. The Allied Council, chaired by an American, stayed neutral. By the end of the day 120 thousand workers were on strike; Austrian Communists gained some ground.

In the morning of Wednesday, 27 September, thousands of pro-communist strike workers took control over OGB regional headquarters in Linz and Graz with their communication infrastructure. Again, the police stayed aside but the reactionaries in Vienna scrambled all their resources to weaken the communist influence. By the end of the day, police and paramilitary units forced the Communists out of OGB buildings in British and American zones. On 28 September, the communists barely raised seventy volunteers to storm the national OGB office in Vienna, and were routed by the police. The majority of industrial workers now relied on instructions from the unions, not Communists nor their Soviet mentors. By 7 p.m. of 27 September, even the Soviets agreed that the strike failed and their radio program instructed Austrian workers to return to work.

On 30 September, pro-communist Conference of Shop Stewards, attended by 2,417 workers' representatives, issued an ultimatumto raise wages immediately or face another general strike on 4 October. The American and British commanders assessed the situation and once again told the Austrian government that their troops would not take action; their armed intervention, should it happen, "would mean shooting... a profound effect inside and outside Austria." The Austrian Minister of Interior concurred: "intervention ... would be the end of the Austrian Government."

== Second strike ==
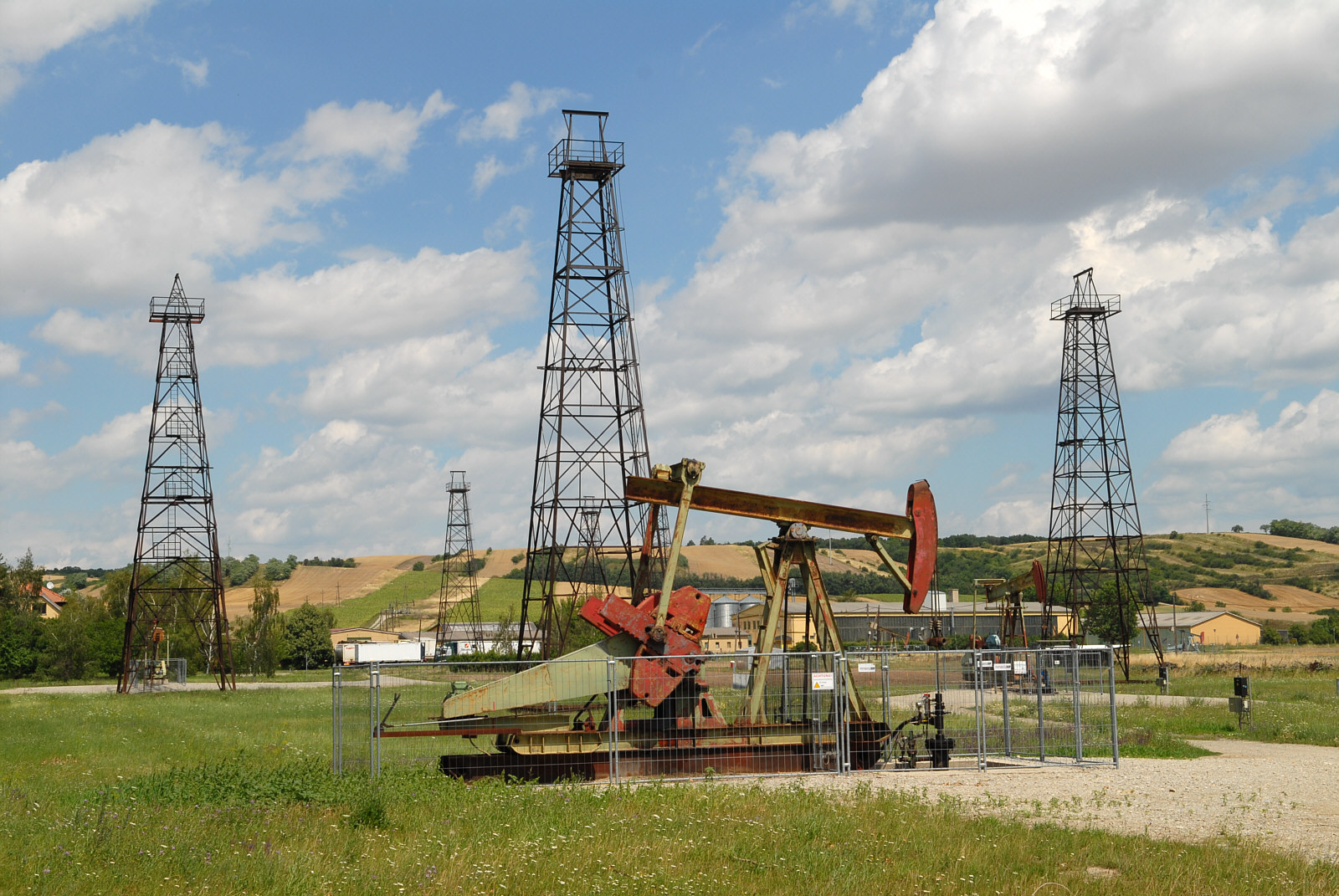
Oilers from the oil fields of Lower Austria (photo of 2008) formed the strike force of Austrian Communists.

In the week that preceded the second strike, the government and the unions actively campaigned against it. There were no doubts that without Soviet assistance, the Austrian communists would fail again, but the degree of Soviet involvement was unknown. Vienna was overwhelmed by rumours of Soviet and Czechoslovak troop movements. The New York Times reported that fearful Viennese swept all available food from the stores. Fears of another Berlin Blockade or even worse intensified on the eve of the strike, when the Soviets instructed Austrian police to stay off the streets and blocked the movement of gendarmes in Vienna. The Austrian government responded with arrests of strike leaders in British and American zones and with an appeal to all the workers: "Repel every act of terror... destroy illegal roadblocks, drive the intruders out of factories.".

The actual strike was limited to Vienna and Lower Austria, and involved around 19% of industrial workforce. The communists made the impact worse by disrupting railroad traffic. They stormed the Stadlau station in Donaustadt three times, were forced away three times, and then blocked the tracks until the evening. On 5 October, they resumed blockade of Stadlau since 5 a.m., took control of the Nordbahnhof, and threatened the Südbahnhof. With the police disabled, railroads were defended by their employees and the volunteers of the "Olah battalion". They were armed with clubs, operated in small teams, and engaged the Communists in hand-to-hand fighting at first opportunity. There were reports that the Soviets provided trucks to move communist crews around, but this was as far as the Soviets went in supporting the strike.

On 5 October, pro-communist representatives convened at another conference in Floridsdorf (Soviet zone) and admitted failure of the second strike.

== Historiography ==
After the failure of the first strike the Austrian Government presented the September events as a deliberate and planned Communist action aimed at overthrowing the government. The idea of a communist putsch has been shared by the historians although the degree of Communist planning is debated. One school of thought supports the notion of a planned and concerted efforts; another says that the Communists merely grabbed the opportunity and relied on yet unknown outcome of the strike and street violence. The third opinion clears the Communists of any long-ranging plans; according to this point of view, the strikes were just labor action. Franz Olah, the leader of anti-communist street gangs, shared this opinion. He said that the Communists never had resources to stage a real putsch, and instead their objective was a mere increase in their representation in national and municipal governments. British and American observers also believed that there were no plans for a putsch. Sir Harold Caccia wrote that the strikes were not the result of a planned putsch, and that Austrian Communists "never committed themselves to an all-out effort."

Austrian accounts of the 1950 strikes emphasize internal political struggle and downplay the Soviet involvement. On the other side of the spectrum, Audrey Kurth Cronin argued that the events were a Soviet-inspired putsch, in fact, the second one after the 1947 food riots. This version is backed by GRU veteran Boris Volodarsky although he did not present any new evidence to prove it.

The degree of Soviet involvement and any plans entertained by the Soviets are still subject to interpretation. According to a series of interviews with unnamed witnesses published by Hugo Portisch in the 1980s, the Soviets were dissatisfied with the disruption caused by Austrian communists. The Soviets allegedly committed all resources to the Korean War and keenly evaded radical confrontation in Europe. According to Portisch, Soviet representatives in Austria were split over the 1950 strikes: some saw an opportunity to suppress Western influence, while others were unwilling to provoke the West, yet others had to meet production targets and opposed any disruption in the Soviet zone. Portisch wrote that Moscow actually intervened to defuse the situation and instructed the Soviet command in Austria to prevent any overt acts by Austrian Communists in a way that would allow them to save face after a defeat.

== Notes and citations ==
=== Cited sources ===
- Bader, William B. (1966). Austria Between East and West. Stanford University Press. ISBN 0-8047-0258-6.
- Bischof, Gunther; Pelinka, Anton; Stiefel, Dietrich (2000). The Marshall Plan in Austria. Transaction Publishing. ISBN 0-7658-0679-7.
- Cronin, Audrey Kurth (1986). "Great Power Politics and the Struggle over Austria." Cornell University Press. ISBN 0-8014-1854-2.
- Williams, Warren (2007). Flashpoint Austria: The Communist-Inspired Strikes of 1950 (paid access). Journal of Cold War Studies. Summer 2007, Vol. 9, No. 3, Pages 115-136. Published by the Massachusetts Institute of Technology.
