= USIA (disambiguation) =

USIA or Usia may refer to:

- Usia, Dildarnagar, Uttar Pradesh, India
- United States Information Agency
- Administration for Soviet Property in Austria
- Usia A genus of fly from the family Bombyliidae.
