= Bruno Kreisky =

Austrian diplomat and chancellor (1911–1990)

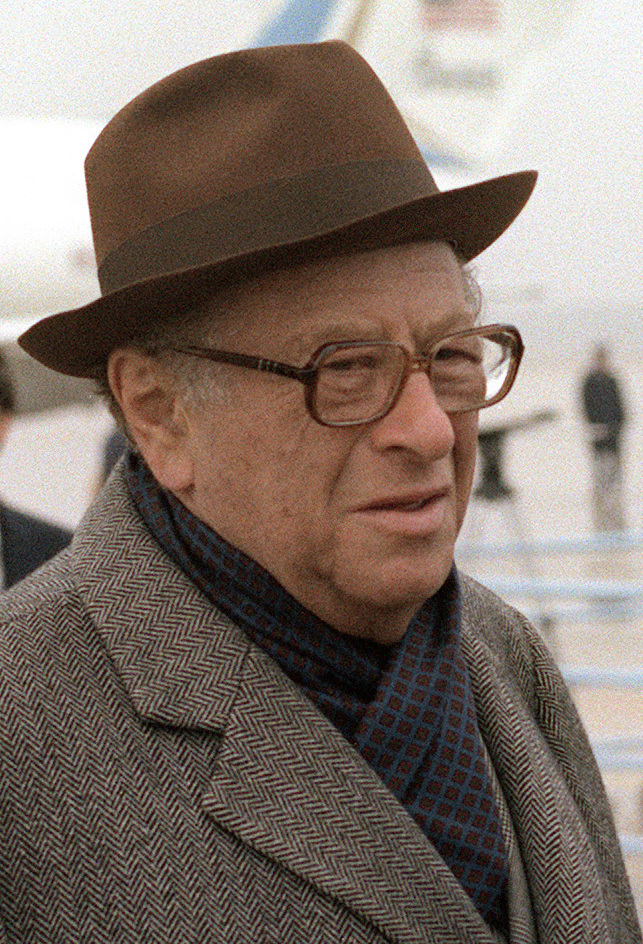
- Kreisky in 1983

Chancellor of Austria
- In office 21 April 1970 – 24 May 1983
- President: Franz Jonas; Rudolf Kirchschläger
- Vice-Chancellor: Rudolf Häuser; Hannes Androsch; Fred Sinowatz
- Preceded by: Josef Klaus
- Succeeded by: Fred Sinowatz

Chair of the Social Democratic Party
- In office 1 February 1967 – 27 October 1983
- Preceded by: Bruno Pittermann
- Succeeded by: Fred Sinowatz

Minister of Foreign Affairs
- In office 16 July 1959 – 19 April 1966
- Chancellor: Julius Raab; Alfons Gorbach; Josef Klaus
- Preceded by: Leopold Figl
- Succeeded by: Lujo Tončić-Sorinj

Personal details
- Born: 22 January 1911 Vienna, Austria
- Died: 29 July 1990 (aged 79) Vienna, Austria
- Resting place: Vienna Central Cemetery
- Party: Social Democratic Party
- Spouse: Vera Fürth (m. 1942; died 1988)
- Children: 2
- Education: University of Vienna

Bruno Kreisky (German: [ˈbʁuːno ˈkʁaɪ̯ski]; 22 January 1911 – 29 July 1990) was an Austrian social democratic politician who was foreign minister from 1959 to 1966 and chancellor from 1970 to 1983. As an influential political figure in Western European social democracy, he worked closely in the Socialist International with like-minded leaders Willy Brandt of West Germany and Olof Palme of Sweden.

Kreisky's 13-year tenure is the longest of any chancellor in republican Austria. Aged 72 by the time he resigned, he is the oldest chancellor to have served after World War II.

== Life and political career ==
Kreisky was born in the Margareten district of Vienna in 1911. His parents were Max (Markus) Kreisky and Irene Kreisky née Felix. His father worked as a textile manufacturer. Shocked by the level of poverty and violence in Austria during the 1920s, he joined the youth wing of the Socialist Party of Austria (SPÖ) in 1925 at age 15. In 1927, he joined the Young Socialist Workers against the wishes of his parents. In 1929, he began studying law at the University of Vienna at the advice of Otto Bauer, who urged him to study law rather than medicine, as he had originally planned. He remained politically active during this period. In 1931, he left the Jewish religious community, becoming agnostic. He took part in the 1934 February Uprising as a courier. In 1934, when the Socialist Party was banned by the Dollfuss dictatorship, he became active in underground political work. He was arrested in 1935 and sentenced to one year in prison for his underground political activity. In March 1938, the Austrian state was incorporated into Germany through the Anschluss, and in September, Kreisky escaped the Nazi persecution of Austrian Jews and the coming Holocaust by emigrating to Sweden, where he remained until 1945. On 23 April 1942, he married Vera Fürth (30 December 1916 – 5 December 1988) and had one son and one daughter. While in exile, Kreisky worked as a journalist and was the head of the Austrian Socialists in Sweden.

He returned to Austria in May 1946, but he was soon back in Stockholm, assigned to the Austrian legation. In 1950, he returned to Vienna, where Federal President Theodor Körner appointed him Assistant Chief of Staff and political adviser. In 1953, he was appointed Undersecretary in the Foreign Affairs Department of the Austrian Chancellery, and in this position he took part in negotiating the 1955 Austrian State Treaty, which ended the four-power occupation of Austria and restored Austria's independence and neutrality.

Kreisky was elected to the Austrian parliament, the Nationalrat, as a Socialist during the 1956 election. He was elected to the Party Executive along with Bruno Pittermann, Felix Slavik, and Franz Olah, and thus became a member of the central leadership body of the party. After the 1959 election, he became foreign minister in the coalition cabinet of Chancellor Julius Raab (ÖVP), a post he continued to hold under Raab's successors Alfons Gorbach (1961–1964) and Josef Klaus (1964–1966). He played a leading role in setting up the European Free Trade Association, helped solve the South Tyrol question with Italy, and proposed a "Marshall Plan" for the countries of the Third World.

In 1966, the ÖVP under Klaus won an absolute majority in the Nationalrat. Memories of the hyper-partisanship that characterised the First Republic were still strong, so he approached Kreisky with new coalition terms. While Kreisky and the other Socialist leadership supported retaining the coalition, the rank and file balked at the proposed terms, and talks broke down. Kreisky resigned from the cabinet, and the ÖVP formed the first one-party government of the Second Republic. The Socialists retained some power and were informally consulted on all major decisions.

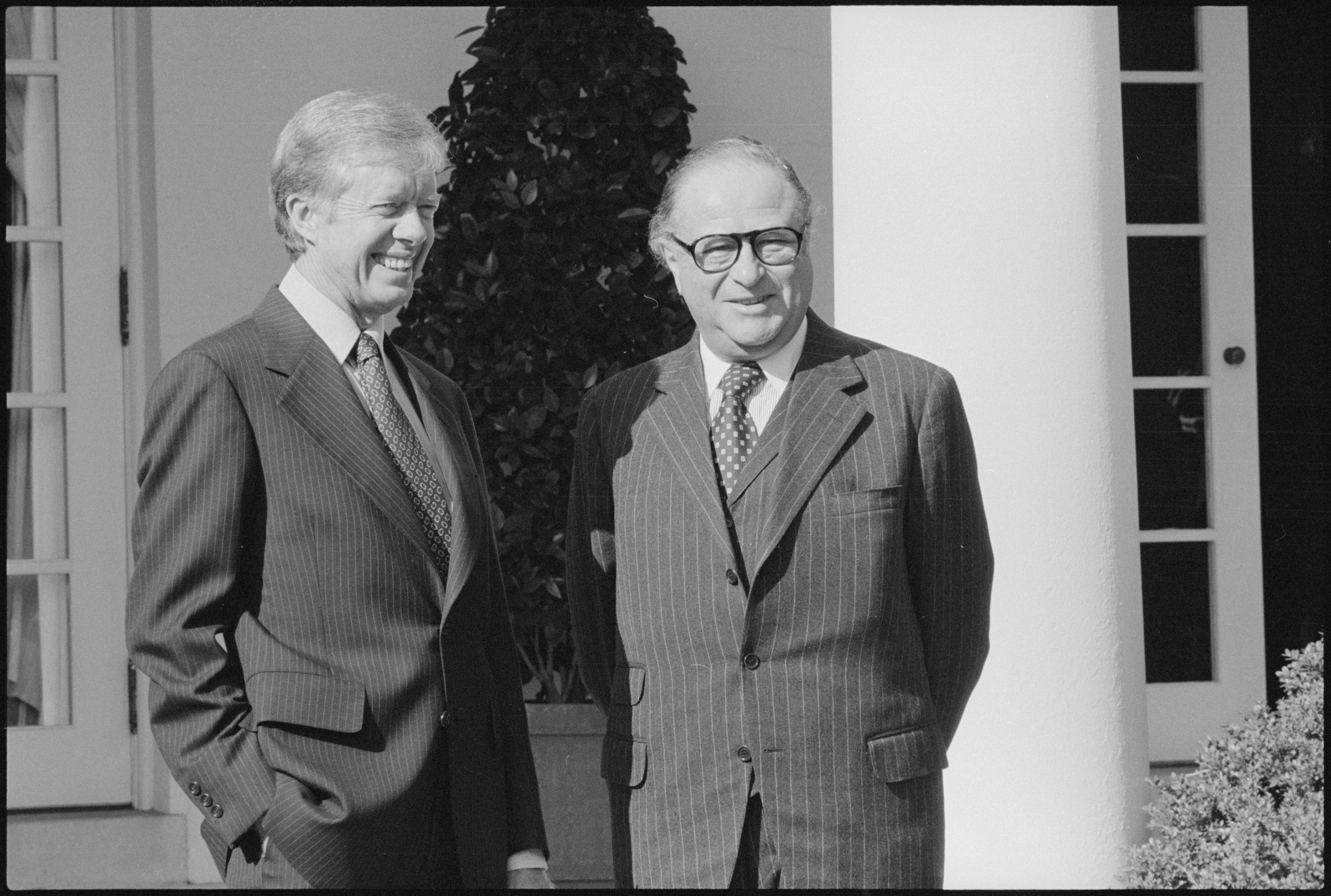
Kreisky with President Jimmy Carter in Washington, D.C. (1979)

In February 1967, Kreisky was elected chairman of the Socialist Party. At the March 1970 elections, the Socialists won 81 seats, two short of a majority. Kreisky became the first Socialist Chancellor since 1920, heading the first purely left-wing government in modern Austrian history. He was also Austria's first Jewish chancellor. Kreisky's government was tolerated by the then national-liberal Freedom Party in return for electoral reforms that expanded the Nationalrat and increased the proportionality of votes. Following the passage of these reforms, he called fresh elections in October 1971. Although the reforms were intended to benefit smaller parties, the Socialists won a strong majority government with 93 seats. They also won half the popular vote, something no Austrian party had ever achieved in a free election. Kreisky was reelected in 1975 and 1979 elections, each time winning comfortable majorities in the Nationalrat.

At the 1983 election, the Socialists lost their absolute majority in the Nationalrat. Kreisky declined to form a minority government and resigned, nominating Fred Sinowatz, his Minister of Education, as his successor. His health was declining, and in 1984, he had an emergency kidney transplant. He died in Vienna in July 1990.

== Political views and programs ==
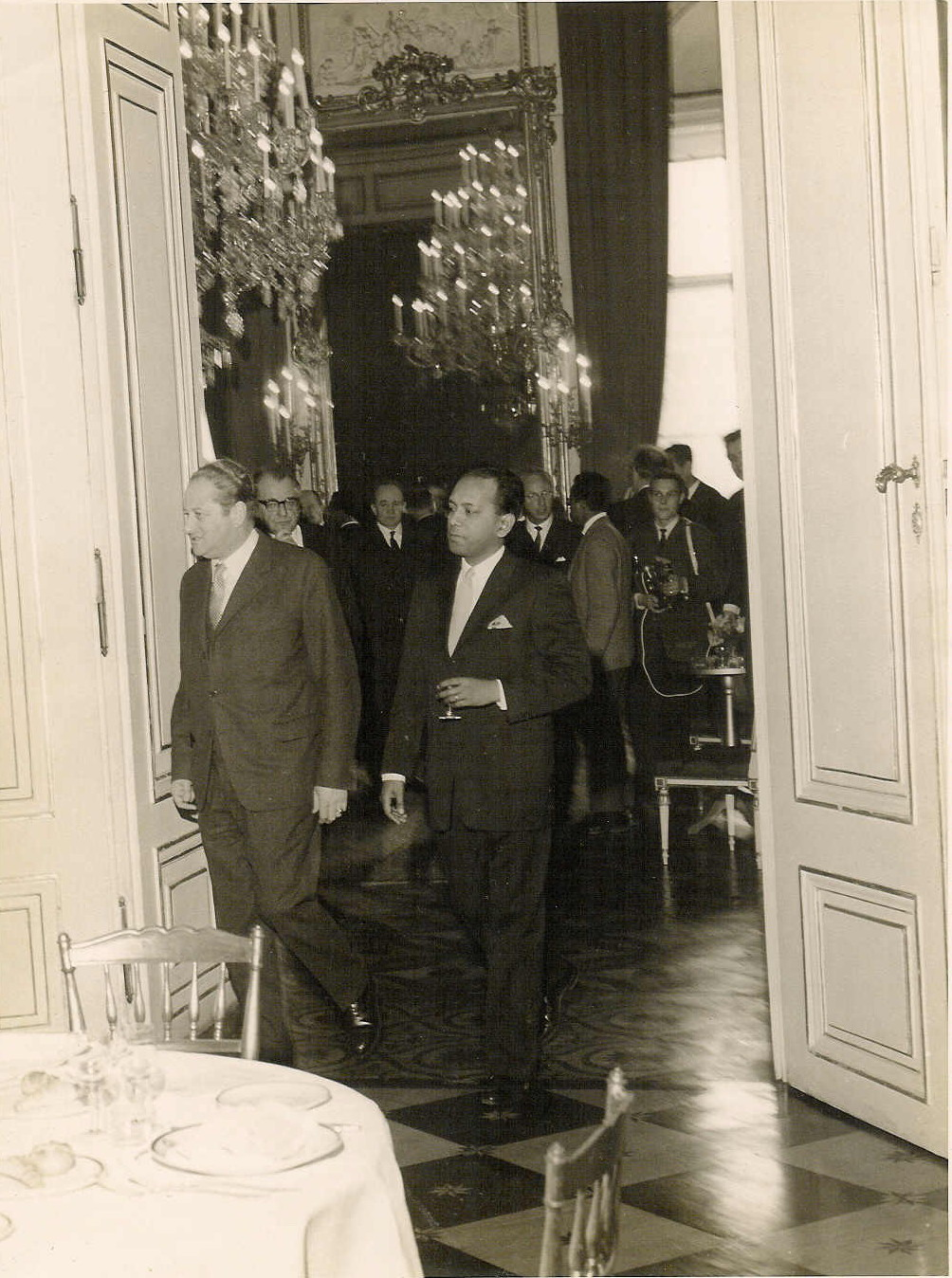
Kreisky (left) with Abul Fateh in Vienna, 1962

In office, Kreisky and his close ally, Justice Minister Christian Broda, pursued a policy of liberal reform in a country which had a tradition of conservative Roman Catholicism. He legalized abortion in the first three months of pregnancy, decriminalized homosexuality, and required children born out of wedlock to be given the same rights as those born within marriage. Nevertheless, he sought to bridge the gap between the Catholic Church and the Austrian Socialist movement and found a willing collaborator in the then Cardinal Archbishop of Vienna, Franz König. Kreisky promised to reduce the mandatory military service from nine to six months. After his election, military service was reduced to eight months.

During Kreisky's premiership, a wide range of progressive reforms was carried out. Amongst other reforms, employee benefits were expanded, the workweek was cut to 40 hours, and legislation providing for equality for women was passed. Kreisky's government established language rights for the country's Slovene and Croatian minorities. Following the 1974 oil shock, Kreisky committed Austria to developing nuclear power to reduce dependence on fossil fuels, although this policy was eventually abandoned after a referendum held in 1978. In 1979, restrictions on redundancy and the dismissal of employees were made. The educational sector was significantly expanded under Kreisky, greatly increasing the numbers of Austrians receiving a university education. In 1982, a maternity allowance payable for 16 weeks was introduced for self-employed women.

Although the 1955 State Treaty prevented Austria from joining the European Union, he supported European integration.

Kreisky was a supporter of Palestinian statehood. Kreisky referred to Israeli prime minister Menachem Begin as a terrorist, and had a poor relationship with Israeli prime minister Golda Meir, especially during the 1973 hostage crisis. He once said that he was "the only politician in Europe Golda Meir can't blackmail." He cultivated friendly relations with Arab leaders such as Anwar Sadat and Muammar Gaddafi, and in 1980, Austria established informal relations with the Palestine Liberation Organisation.

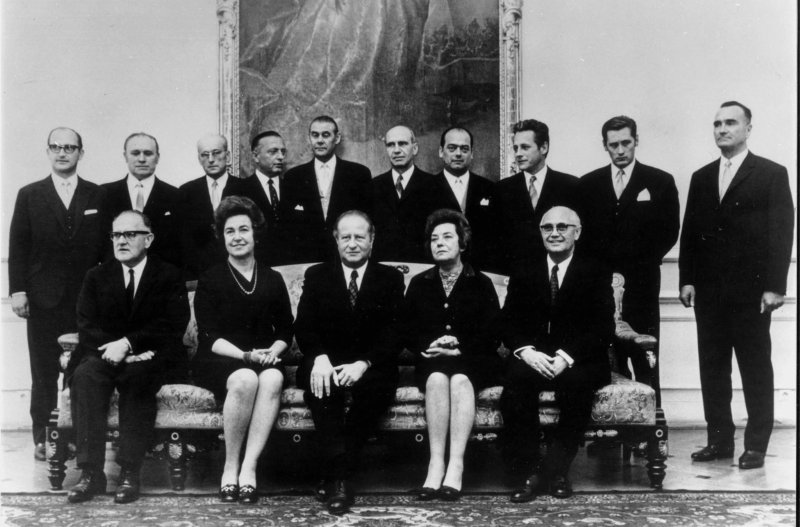
1970 Kreisky Cabinent: Otto Rösch (standing, fifth from left); Joseph Moser (2nd row, fourth from left); Erwin Frühbauer (standing, fourth from right); Hans Ollinger (standing right)

Kreisky was notable for his allegedly apologetic approach to former Nazi party members and contemporary far-right Austrian politicians. For example, Kreisky described far-right populist Jörg Haider as "a political talent worth watching". Following his election in 1970, Kreisky wanted to demonstrate that he was indeed "Chancellor of all Austrians", and appointed four politicians with Nazi backgrounds to his cabinet. When Nazi hunter Simon Wiesenthal reported that these four members of Kreisky's cabinet were former Nazis, Kreisky did not remove them from the government, though one did resign. They were former SS-Untersturmführer Hans Öllinger, who took part in flamethrower commandos; Otto Rösch, a teacher at the National Political Institutes of Education; and Erwin Frühbauer and Josef Moser, Nazi Party members. Kreisky responded that everybody had the right to make political mistakes in their youth. This incident marked the beginning of a bitter conflict, which did not end until Kreisky died. At a party conference, his secretary Leopold Gratz claimed that Wiesenthal was operating a "secret police and surveillance centre" and was in no way allowed to defame democratically elected politicians. Kreisky later on said that Wiesenthal "makes a living telling the world that Austria is anti-Semitic. What else can he do?"; he went on to call Wiesenthal a former Gestapo agent, based on Czechoslovak intelligence papers which turned out to be fakes, and wanted a parliamentary investigation of Wiesenthal's Jewish Documentary Center in Vienna. He claimed that Wiesenthal was employing mafia methods. In 1986, Wiesenthal filed a libel lawsuit (although Kreisky had the power to declare immunity if he so chose), and when Kreisky later accused Wiesenthal of being an agent of the Gestapo, working with the Judenrat in Lvov, these accusations were incorporated into the lawsuit as well. Three years later the court found Kreisky guilty of defamation and sentenced him to pay a fine of 270,000 schillings for defamation. The suit was decided in Wiesenthal's favour in 1989, but after Kreisky's death nine months later, his heirs refused to pay. Wiesenthal later commented: "Kreisky lost, and instead of paying the fine, he died." When the relevant archives were later opened for research, no evidence was found that Wiesenthal had been a collaborator. In 1975, Kreisky proposed that his Social Democratic Party should form a coalition with the Freedom Party, headed by Friedrich Peter, a former SS-Obersturmführer; Kreisky supported Peter and said that Wiesenthal was a "crypto-racist" who himself was responsible for antisemitism in Austria.

In 1976, the Bruno Kreisky Foundation for Outstanding Achievements in the Area of Human Rights was founded to mark Kreisky's 65th birthday. Every two years, the Bruno Kreisky Human Rights Prize is awarded to an international figure who has advanced the cause of human rights.

Later in his life, Kreisky tried to help some Soviet dissidents. In particular, in 1983, he sent a letter to the Soviet premier Yuri Andropov demanding the release of dissident Yuri Orlov, but Andropov left Kreisky's letter unanswered.

== Legacy ==
Today, Kreisky's chancellorship is the subject of both controversy and nostalgia. Many of his former supporters see in Kreisky the last socialist of the old school and look back admiringly at an era when the standard of living was noticeably rising, when the welfare state was in full swing and when, by means of a state-funded programme promoting equality of opportunity, working class children were encouraged to stay on at school and eventually receive higher education. All this resulted in a decade of prosperity and optimism about the future. Critics of the modern SPÖ who believe the party has abandoned its historic principles have used the phrase "Kreisky, schau oba!" (transl. Kreisky, look down on us!).

Conservatives criticise Kreisky's policy of deficit spending, expressed in his famous comment during the 1979 election campaign that he preferred that the state run up high debts rather than see people become unemployed. They hold Kreisky responsible for Austria's subsequent economic difficulties.

Despite this criticism, Kreisky did much to transform Austria during his time in office, with considerable improvements in working conditions, a dramatic rise in the average standard of living, and a significant expansion of the welfare state.

Bruno Kreisky is also now known for institutions that he helped found as well as those that are remembered in his name. Theses include the Bruno Kreisky Forum for International Dialogue (which now sits in his former residence) and the Austrian Institute for International Affairs.

== See also ==
- Kreisky-Peter-Wiesenthal affair

Political offices
Preceded by Leopold Figl	Foreign Minister of Austria; 1959 – 1966	Succeeded by Lujo Tončić-Sorinj
Preceded by Josef Klaus	Chancellor of Austria; 1970 – 1983	Succeeded by Fred Sinowatz
Party political offices
Preceded by Bruno Pittermann	SPÖ Party chairman 1967 – 1983	Succeeded by Fred Sinowatz
Preceded by (United States) Prentis C. Hale	President of Organising Committee for Winter Olympic Games; 1964	Succeeded by (France) Jean de Beaumont
Preceded by (Japan) Kogoro Uemura	President of Organising Committee for Winter Olympic Games; 1976	Succeeded by (United States) J. Bernard Fell
Academic offices
Preceded by Simone Veil	College of Europe Orateur; 1981	Succeeded by Gaston Thorn
