= Otto Rösch =

Austrian Secretary of State

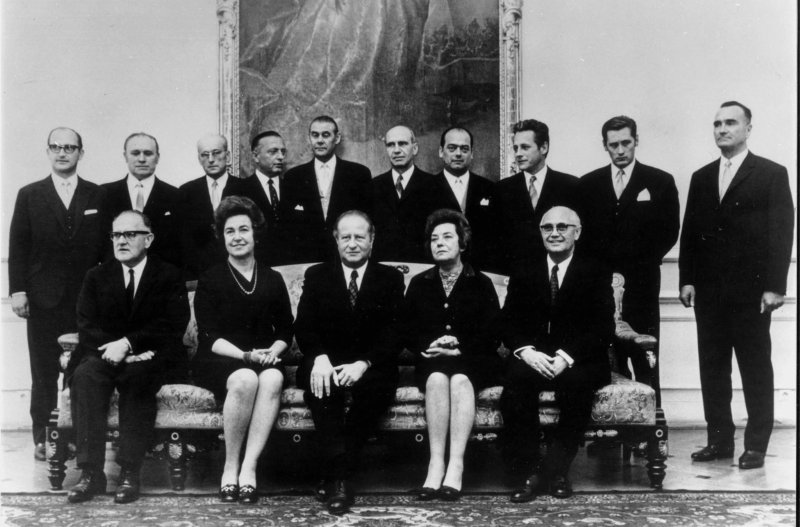
- Otto Rösch (standing, fifth from left) in the Bruno Kreisky cabinet (1970)
- Born: Otto Franz Rösch; 24 March 1917; Vienna, Austria
- Died: 3 November 1995 (aged 78)
- Occupation: Politician
- Years active: 1951–1991

State Secretary in the Federal Ministry of Defense
- In office 1959–1966

Otto Franz Rösch or Otto Roesch (German pronunciation: [ˈɔto ˈʁœʃ]; 24 March 1917 – 3 November 1995) was an Austrian politician of the SPÖ. He was a member of the Nazi Party and worked in a National Socialist educational institution. He rose to become the Secretary of state in Austria.

== Early life ==
Rösch was born in Vienna, Austria on 24 March 1917. He studied (law and philosophy) at the University of Vienna and the University of Graz.

== Career ==
Rösch was a member of the Nazi Party and on 8 December 1947, he was arrested and put on trial as a neo-Nazi. He was acquitted in 1949.

Rösch rose to become the Secretary of State in Austria. During the Cold War, he called for reducing defense spending. He also said the West was threatening the neutrality of Austria more than the East saying, "...the military threat from the West is larger." Rösch also served a Minister of the Interior in a previous government.
