= Schoenau ultimatum =

1973 hostage crisis in Marchegg, Austria

- Part of the Israeli–Palestinian conflict
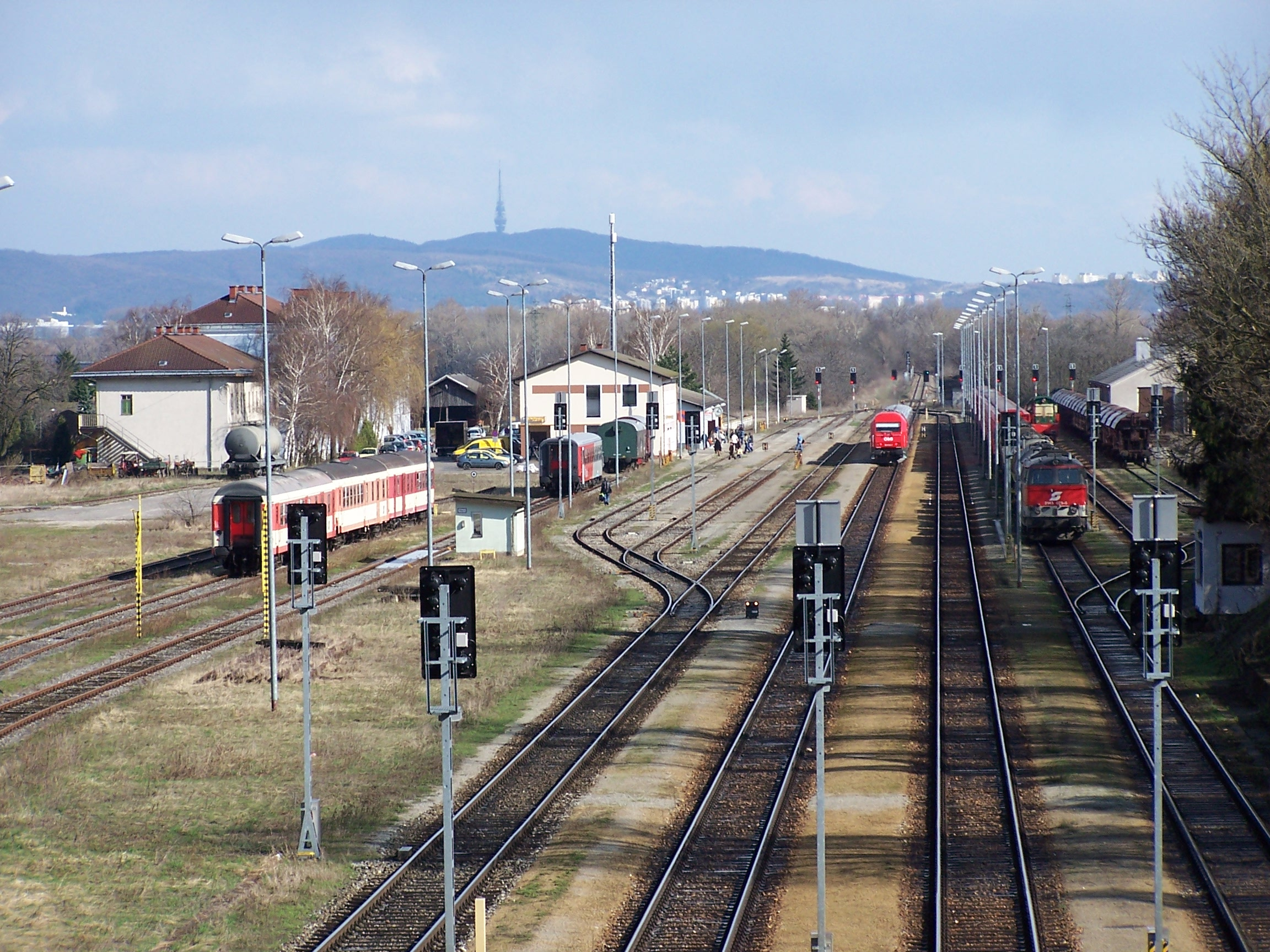
- The train station where the attack took place.
- Location: Marchegg, Austria
- Date: 28–29 September 1973
- Target: Jewish passengers
- Attack type: Hostage-taking
- Deaths: 0
- Perpetrator: As-Sa'iqa

The Schoenau ultimatum was a hostage-taking incident in Marchegg, Austria by the Palestinian militant group As-Sa'iqa in 1973. At the time Vienna was a transit point for Russian Jews, the largest population of Jews remaining in Europe. The Schoenau ultimatum focused attention away from Egyptian and Syrian military build-up and their planned attack that would come to be known as the Yom Kippur War.

== Background ==
The Israeli government had long encouraged European Jewish refugees to immigrate to Israel. After many of the Jews displaced by the Holocaust had emigrated to Israel, the Russian Jewish population, the last source of Ashkenazi Jews, who were facing increasing oppression within the Soviet Union, became an important population encouraged to emigrate to Israel. In the wake of the Six-Day War in 1967, the Soviet Union broke off diplomatic relations with Israel. This stirred up Zionist feelings among some Soviet Jews, the majority of whom were assimilated and non-religious.

A mass emigration was politically undesirable for the Soviet regime. As increasing numbers of Soviet Jews applied to emigrate to Israel in the period following the Six-Day War, many were formally refused permission to leave. After the Dymshits–Kuznetsov hijacking affair in 1970 and the crackdown that followed, strong international condemnations caused the Soviet authorities to increase the emigration quota. From 1960 to 1970, only 4,000 people left the Soviet Union; in the following decade, the number rose to 250,000.

Many of these Jews passed through the transit center located at the Schönau Castle in Austria. The Castle was used by the Austrian government as a transit camp for Soviet Jews who had just been permitted to leave the Soviet Union prior to emigrating to the West.

== Hostage taking ==
On 28 September 1973, three to seven (Note: Sources give different numbers of hostages taken) Jewish emigrants were taken hostage, among them a 73-year-old man, an ailing woman and a three-year-old child, on a train at the Austrian–Czechoslovak border by a Syrian-based Palestinian Arab militant group, As-Sa'iqa. In addition to demanding a free passage to an Arab country, they gave the Austrian government an ultimatum to close the Schönau transit center or they would execute the hostages. Austrian Chancellor Bruno Kreisky gave in to the demands and closed the Jewish Agency's transit facility.

The incident captured the attention of Israeli media and became a cause célèbre. Israeli Prime Minister Golda Meir diverted her return flight from the Council of Europe to try to convince Kreisky to not give in to the demands. Kreisky refused to change his position, and Meir returned to Israel infuriated. With the center closed, the militants were flown to Libya. Austria then opened a new center in another location.

== Result ==
The entire incident captured the attention of the Israeli government when it should have been focusing on Egyptian and Syrian military build-up. The Schoenau ultimatum is seen as one of the causes of the massive military intelligence blunder of the Israeli Intelligence in not foreseeing the surprise attack of the Yom Kippur War.

On December 10, 1973, the Schönau Castle Jewish center was closed permanently and subsequently replaced by the Wöllersdorf National Association of the Red Cross of Lower Austria for refugees, where emigres could stay for no more than 14 hours while awaiting airline flights to Israel. The hostage-taking also lead to the founding of the Austrian special police force unit today known as Cobra.
