= Franz Olah =

Austrian politician (1910–2009)

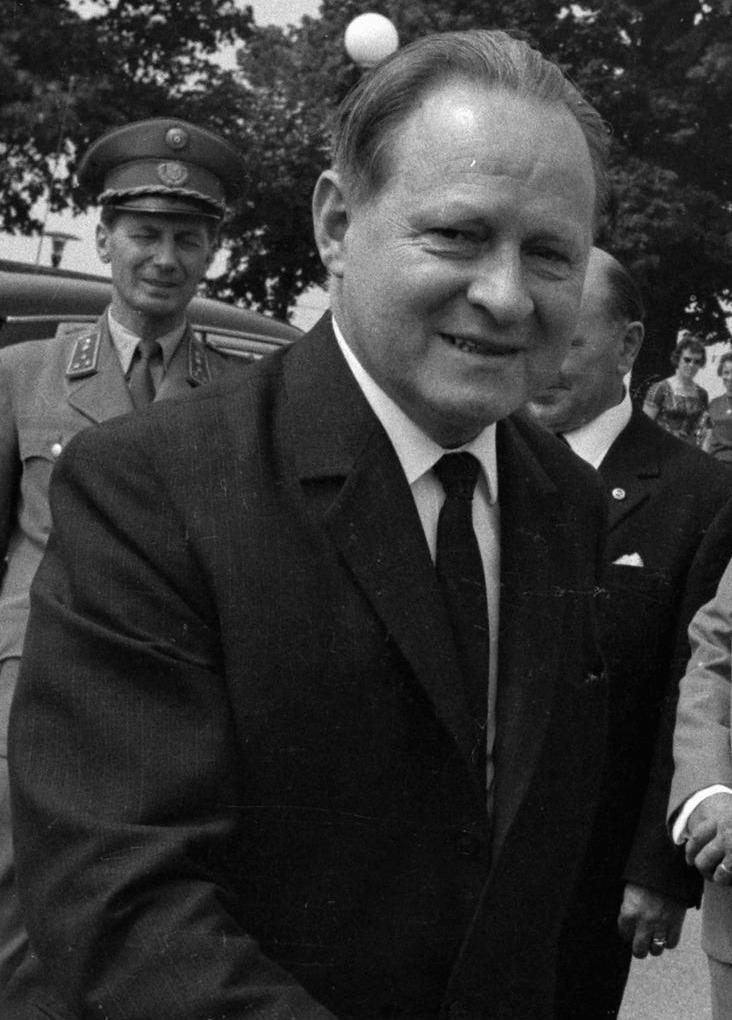
- Olah in 1964

Minister of the Interior
- In office 27 March 1963 – 21 September 1964
- Chancellor: Alfons Gorbach
- Preceded by: Josef Afritsch
- Succeeded by: Hans Czettel

Personal details
- Born: 13 March 1910 Vienna, Cisleithania, Austria-Hungary
- Died: 4 September 2009 (aged 99)
- Party: SPÖ (until 1964); Democratic Progressive Party

Franz Olah (13 March 1910 – 4 September 2009) was an Austrian politician who served as the country's Interior Minister from 1963 until 1964 as a member of the Social Democratic Party (SPÖ).

Olah was born on 13 March 1910 in Vienna. He attended school in Budapest for three years. Olah returned to his native Vienna from Budapest where he learned to build pianos. He also began developing ties with Austrian trade unions and the Social Democratic Party of Austria during this period of his life.

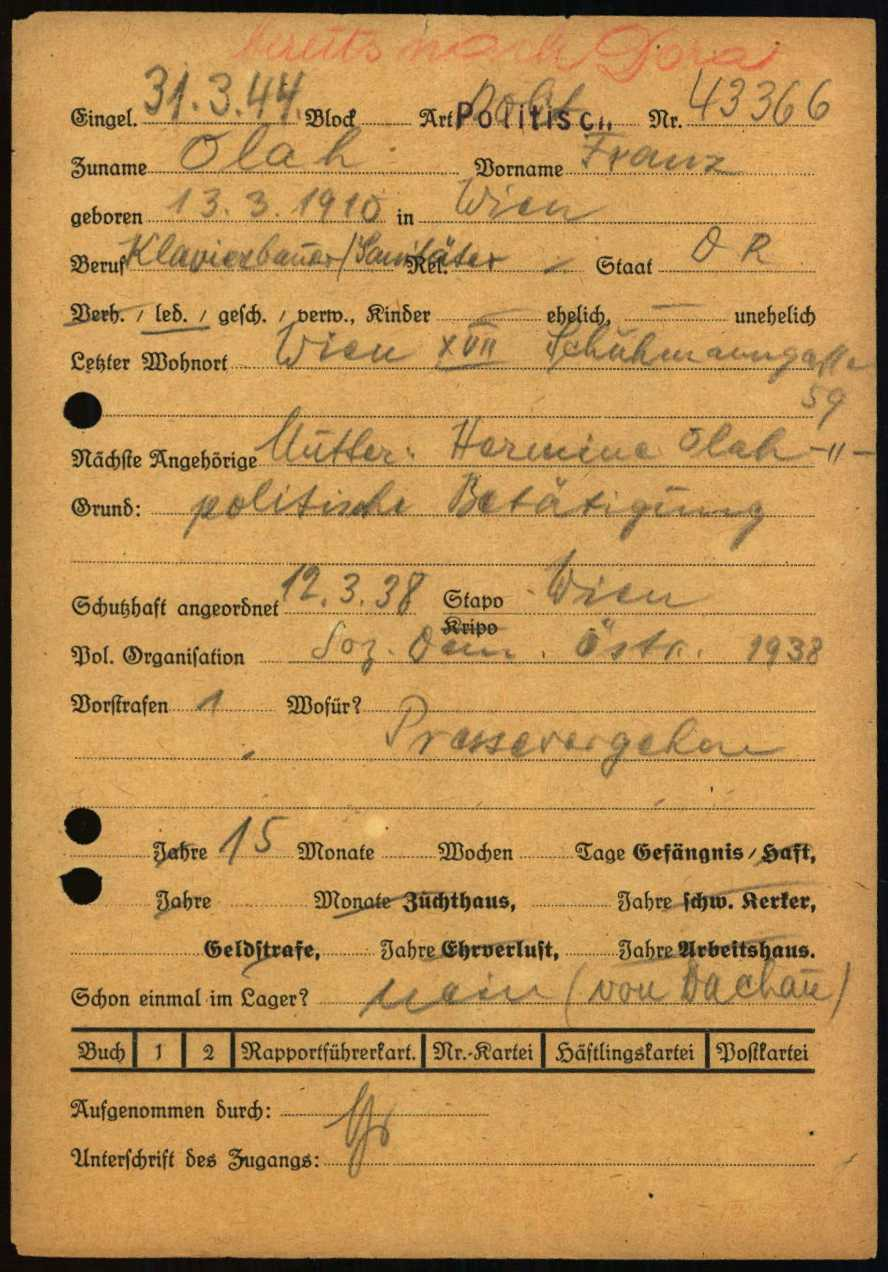
Registration form of Franz Olah as a prisoner at Buchenwald concentration camp

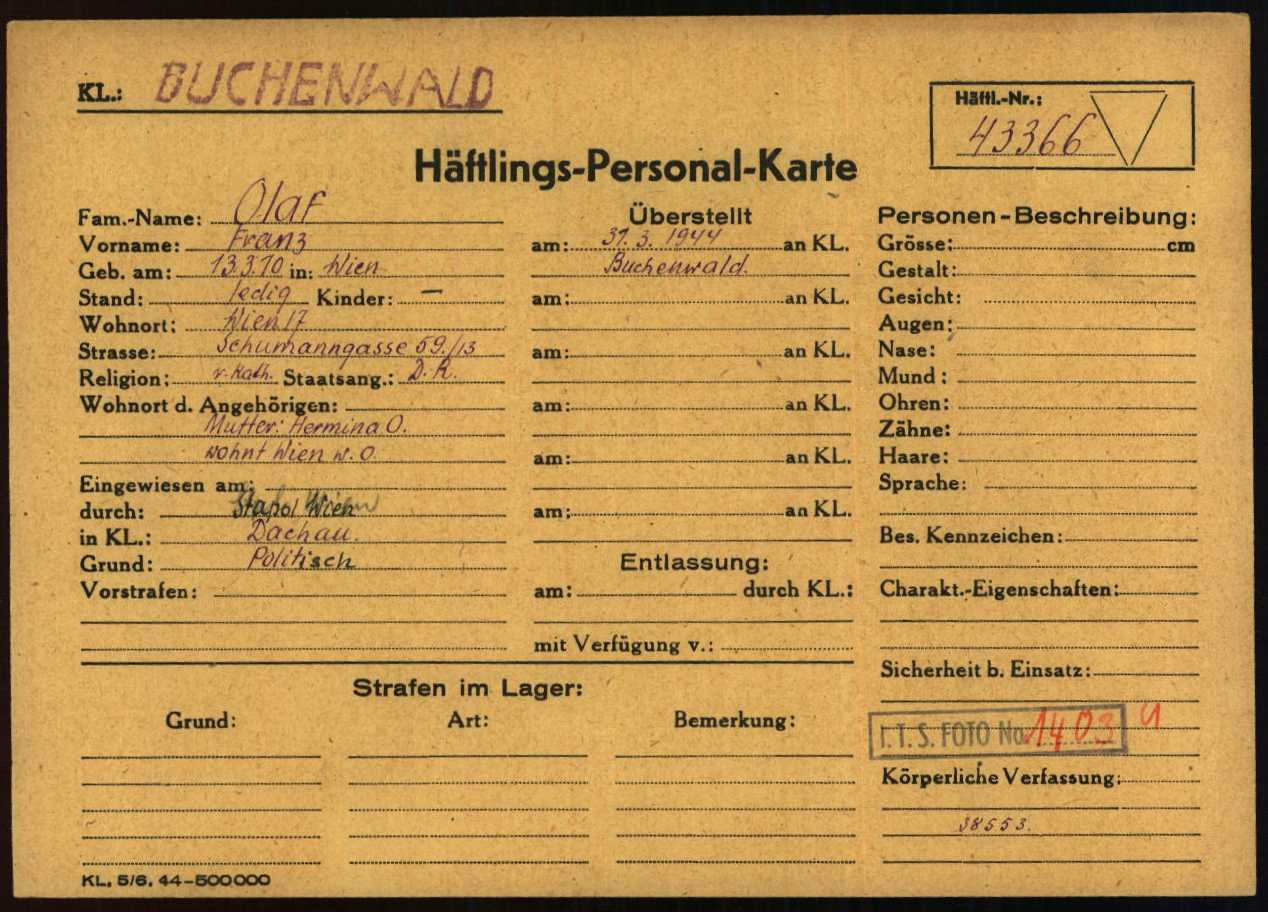
Prisoner registration card, also from Buchenwald

Olah found himself in trouble with the police during the 1930s. In 1938, Austria lost its independence and was annexed by Nazi Germany during the Anschluss, which brought the rule of Adolf Hitler and the Nazis. Olah was arrested by the Nazis following the Anschluss and deported on the very first train of Austrian prisoners to the Dachau concentration camp in 1938. He was transferred as a prisoner to several German concentration camps throughout World War II. Olah was finally freed shortly before the end of World War II.

Olah was elected as a member of the Austrian Parliament in 1948. He served as second president of its lower house, the National Council, from 1959 until 1961. He next served as the Austrian Interior Minister from 1963 until 1964.

Olah opposed the 1950 Austrian general strikes by means of force. Olah resigned from the SPÖ in 1964. He was also caught in a financial scandal during this time period. In 1969, he was sentenced to one year in prison for misusing union funds.

He founded the now defunct Democratic Progressive Party (Demokratische Fortschrittliche Partei) in 1965. The party garnered more than 3% of the vote in the 1966 Austrian legislative election, but failed to win any seats in Parliament. In 1969, the Democratic Progressive Party won three seats on the Vienna city council.

Franz Olah died on 4 September 2009 at the age of 99.

Trade union offices
Preceded by Johann Böhm	President of the Austrian Trade Union Federation; 1959–1963	Succeeded by Anton Benya
