= Administration for Soviet Property in Austria =

Soviet state entity directly controlling part of the Austrian economy, 1946–1955

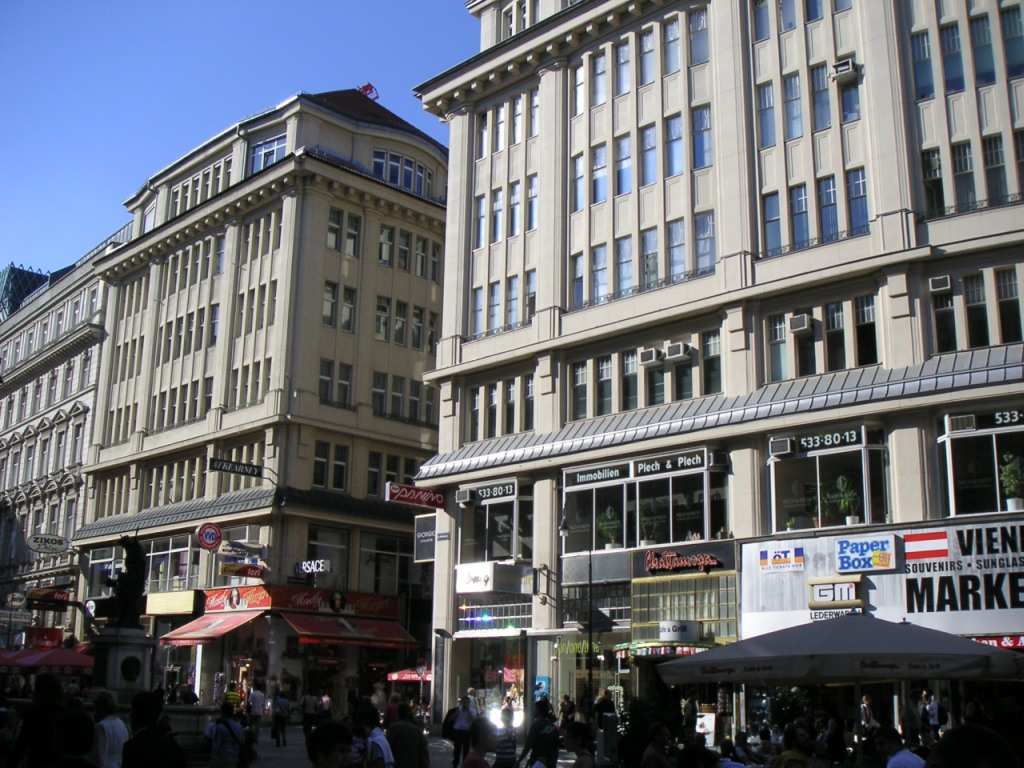
Trattnerhof in Graben, Vienna, former headquarters of the USIA.

The Administration for Soviet Property in Austria, or the USIA (Russian: УСИА, Управление советским имуществом в Австрии) was formed in the Soviet zone of Allied-occupied Austria in June 1946 and operated until the withdrawal of Soviet troops in 1955. USIA operated as a de facto state corporation and controlled over four hundred expropriated Austrian factories, transportation and trading companies. USIA assets included formerly independent Austrian companies (ÖAF), factories once owned by German corporations (AEG) and former SS enterprises (DEST). At its peak in 1951 the conglomerate employed around 60 thousand people, or 10% of Austrian industrial labor. USIA was exempt from Austrian tariffs, disregarded Austrian taxation, and could easily trade with Eastern Europe despite the Iron Curtain and Western trade embargoes. The extraterritorial corporation attempted to be self-sufficient and was very weakly integrated with the rest of Austrian economy.

== Establishment ==
Occupation of Germany and Austria by the Soviet troops was followed by large-scale dismantling of former German equipment which was shipped to the Soviet Union as war reparations. Austria lost, in 1951 dollars, 200 million dollars' worth of German industrial properties (out of total 1.5 billion). Dismantling continued until the early summer of 1946, when the Soviet policy changed from taking Austrian assets to managing them for a profit. The Soviet Department for Investigation of German Properties compiled an inventory of remaining industrial assets in the Soviet zone (Lower Austria, Burgenland and eastern districts of Upper Austria). June 27, 1945, the Soviet command transformed this Department into the Administration for Soviet Property in Eastern Austria (USIVA) and placed all industrial assets under its control. In 1947 the name was shortened to USIA. Its internal structure mimicked that of the Soviet cabinet, with nine divisions paralleling nine ministries of industries. No less than eleven ministries in Moscow had a say in USIA affairs.

Only one-tenth of USIA assets were, indeed, German. Others were historically Austrian properties, expropriated with ludicrous explanations or with no explanations at all. Expropriation of lands of the House of Esterházy was "justified" because, according to the Soviets, the knighthood of the Holy Roman Empire conferred in 1806 qualified Esterházy as Germans rather than Austrians. Austrian government was forced to accept the fact but refused to legalize the expropriations through records in land and corporate registers. The Soviets used this refusal as a pretext for not paying Austrian taxes. The exact number of businesses under USIA control is subject to different interpretations. According to Austrian 1955 sources, there were 419 enterprises, of the 300 in the industry. A different source named 160 enterprises in 1954 (excluding the oil fields, transportation companies and trading outlets). The Soviets also operated Soviet Military Bank (SMB) which evolved from the Red Army field treasury. It tried to obtain an Austrian banking license but the government denied it in fear of Soviet influence over Austrian finances.

The number of employees varied from 22 thousand in 1946 to a peak of 60 thousand in 1951 and down to 36 thousand in 1955. A disproportionately high share of USIA staff were Austrian Communists, especially after the 1950 Austrian general strikes, when communists were fired en masse from non-USIA businesses. The strikes of the 1950s were powered by organized pro-communist workers of the USIA factories in the Soviet sector of Vienna. The Soviets, however, placed business interests above "class unity" with Austrian Communists. According to Hugo Portisch, Soviet representatives in Austria were split over the 1950 strikes: some saw an opportunity to suppress the Western influence, while the USIA management had to meet production targets and opposed any disruption in the Soviet zone. Portisch wrote that Moscow intervened to defuse the situation and denied support to Austrian Communists.

== Operations ==
USIA was initially managed by Red Army staff; after 1949 they were replaced by trained industrial managers. The organization was governed by a chief executive with three assistants for political, personnel, and commercial matters. USIA chiefs, on average, served two years before replacement. Over nine years of its history, USIA had five chiefs, SMV (Soviet oil enterprise) had four chairmen, etc. At first, the Soviets intended to integrate USIA enterprises into their own economy, but the futility of such and exercise soon became evident and they admitted the need to cooperate with the rest of the Austrian economy.

USIA accounted for only 5% of Austrian national output and 30% of the Soviet zone output but possessed significant or even monopolistic share in some industries: 60% in glass making, 43% in leather, 40% in iron and steel etc. The governments of Austria and the United States, anxious about Soviet influence, invested Marshall Plan funds into competing businesses outside of the Soviet zone and the USIA monopolists gradually lost their advantage. The Soviets had no intention to invest their own funds into Austria, the sole exception being the oil fields in Lower Austria. As a result, Soviet-occupied territories lagged behind the rest of Austria in economic growth, their plant and equipment soon became "very much substandard for Austria". Some USIA-ran Austrian companies, fed up with Soviet control, simply moved their personnel and operations to the West, leaving the Soviets with empty shells (as was the case of Porr AG).

According to an investigation of USIA business in 1946–1955, 20% of its products were traded and consumed within USIA, 38% sold to Eastern Europe, 42% sold to non-USIA Austrian customers, and only 1% to Western European customers. The United States suppressed USIA operations through a "neutralization plan" devised in 1947. An embargo imposed by the United States on exports behind the Iron Curtain prohibited other Austrian businesses from selling their products to USIA, unless it guaranteed that the finished products will stay in Austria. Dealing with USIA was problematic because a valid legal title could not be enforced when allowed by the West. Vienna City Hall informally banned municipal purchases of USIA products. Marshall Plan money was deliberately deployed against USIA interests. Despite these problems USIA had a crucial and unfair competitive advantage. It was exempt from Austrian customs and foreign trade regulations. It routinely disregarded and evaded Austrian taxes and its trucking arm engaged in outright smuggling. USIA products easily moved across the Iron Curtain and could be sold at a profit and below fair market prices inside Austria. USIA retail shops in Vienna traded below market and were frequented by many Americans of modest means.

USIA operations declined since 1951. Between 1951 and 1955, over a hundred of its enterprises were shut down or merged. In 1955 Austria became an independent state and the Soviet Union withdrew its troops. The assets of USIA were sold to the Austrian government for 150 million US dollars, paid with goods over six years. The oil fields were subject to a separate agreement, which cost the Austrians around 200 million dollars. All written documentation of USIA disappeared.

USIA profits withdrawn by the Soviets from the Austrian economy, including the final payment, agreed in the Austrian State Treaty, are estimated at 1.072 billion U.S. dollars. Estimates of Soviet reparations in full range from 1.547 to 2.647 billion U.S. dollars. Per capita, Austria paid more reparations than any other Axis state or territory. Soviet rule over the economy of Eastern Austria left a deep and lasting impression on the Austrians. The 1958 "Final Report" on USIA activities concluded that the sole purpose of USIA was "to exploit Austria's natural and human resources as possibly and systematically as possible ... exploitation in colonial style amid a highly developed European economy, the extent and economic success of which are astounding ... This economic enclave of the occupation economy in Austria was used to fortify the economic potential of its bloc, to pursue its political objectives and, finally, to function as an economic bridge positioned directly opposite Western Austria and the Western World as a whole."
