= Boris Volodarsky =

English historian

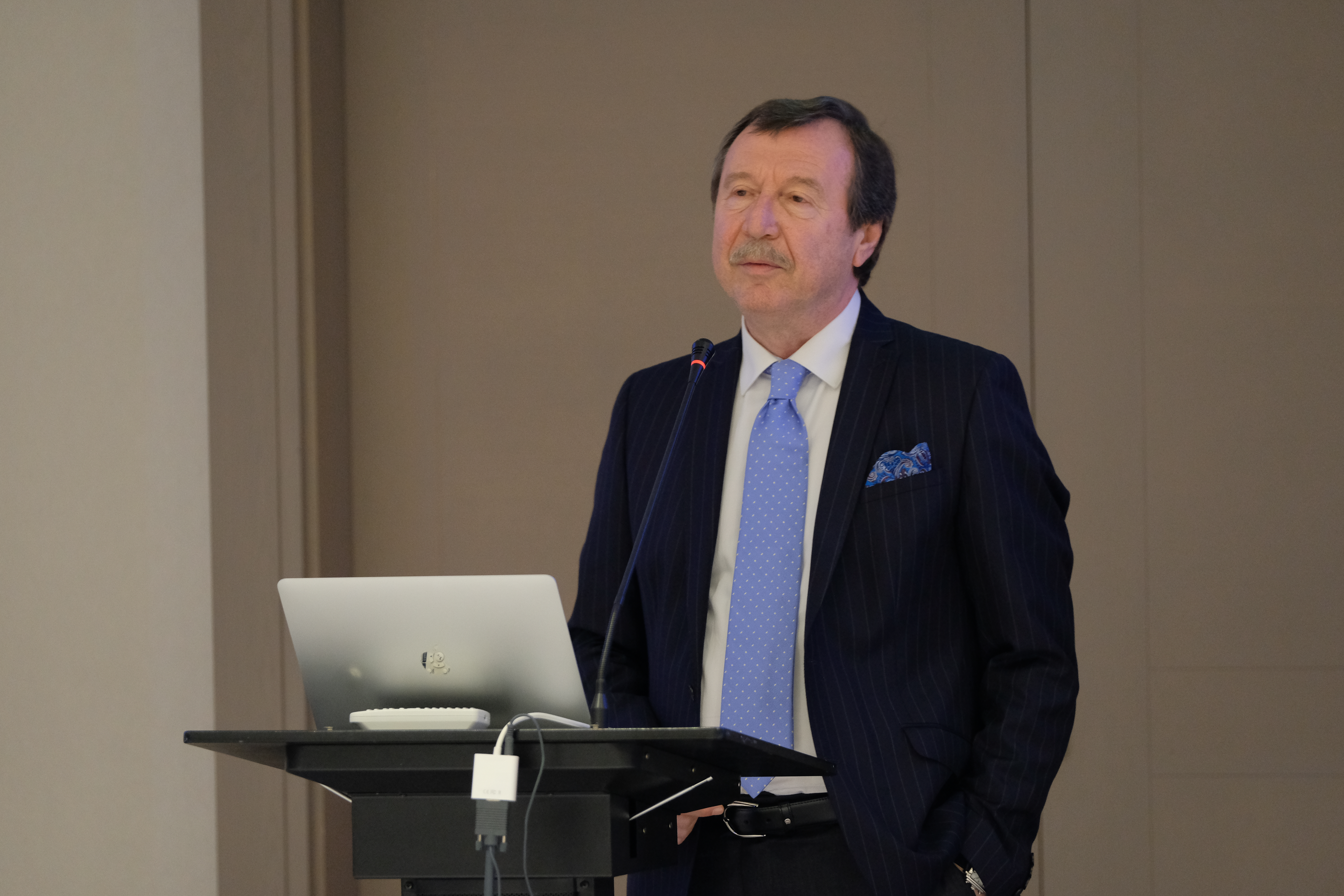
Dr. Boris Volodarsky (2019)

Boris Borisovich Volodarsky (Russian: Борис Борисович Володарский; born 14 August 1955 in Syzran, Kuybyshev Oblast) is an English historian, Fellow of the Royal Historical Society, specialising in Intelligence History, which he has studied for almost 30 years after having moved to the West, and the history of the Spanish Civil War. He formerly served as a captain in the Spetsnaz GRU, a Russian special forces unit.

== Education ==
Volodarsky has a PhD from the London School of Economics and Political Science

Since 2010, Volodarsky has been a Research Fellow at the LSE's Cañada Blanch Centre for Contemporary Spanish Studies; a member of the Cambridge Intelligence Seminar; and a member of the World Association of International Studies (WAIS), Stanford University, USA.

== Publications ==
Volodarsky wrote The KGB's Poison Factory: From Lenin to Litvinenko (2009) and several follow-up books and articles on the history of Soviet intelligence. He is a regular contributor to Radio Free Europe/Radio Liberty, Voice of America, ITV, and The John Batchelor Show. Volodarsky also acted as the chief consultant for the BBC Panorama documentary How to Poison a Spy (2007).

The first book was a short biography of the Soviet defector Nikolai Khokhlov (2005), whom he knew personally, for the series Personal Files. Volodarsky has also published a critical biography of the Soviet defector Alexander Orlov (2014), which the former Official Historian for the British Security Service MI5, the Cambridge Professor Christopher Andrew, characterised as "a major contribution to the history of Soviet intelligence and foreign policy". In his review of the book for The Spectator, Alan Judd, the former private secretary to the MI6 chief, writes that "Volodarsky enhances our understanding. His is not the last word – we'll never get there – but it is a significant and valuable addition." According to Professor Richard B. Spence, "Stalin's Agent is a must-read for anyone seriously interested in the history of modern espionage, the Soviet aspect especially, and the history of the Spanish Civil War. It is likely to stand as a basic reference work for many years to come." Its shorter version, mainly covering Soviet intelligence operations during the Spanish Civil War, was published in Spain (2013) and in Romania (2015).

=== Books ===
- Nikolai Khokhlov: "WHISTLER" (Vienna-London: Borwall Publishing, 2005),ISSN 1813-3436;
- The KGB's Poison Factory: From Lenin to Litvinenko (London: Frontline Books, 2009; USA, Zenith Books, 2010), ISBN 978-0760337530;
- El caso Orlov (Barcelona: Crítica, 2013), ISBN 978-8498925531;
- KGB mürgitehas : Leninist Litvinenkoni (Tallinn: Pegasus, 2014), ISBN 978-9949531769;
- Stalin's Agent: The Life and Death of Alexander Orlov (Oxford: Oxford University Press, 2015), ISBN 978-0199656585;
- Truciciele z KGB (Warszawa: RM, 2015), ISBN 978-8377732861;
- Cazul Orlov: Dosare KGB (Bucharest: Litera, 2015) ISBN 978-6067417838;
- Assassins: The KGB's Poison Factory Ten Years On (London: Frontline Books, 2019) ISBN 978-1526733924;
- The Murder of Alexander Litvinenko: To Kill a Mocking Bird (London: White Owl, 2023) ISBN 978-1399060172;
- The Birth of the Soviet Secret Police: The History's Great Heist, 1917–1927 (London: Frontline Books, 2023) ISBN 978-1526792259;

=== Selected journalistic articles ===
- "The KGB's Poison Factory", The Wall Street Journal (USA), XXIII/84 (7 April 2005), 13.
- "Getting the Reds out of the Orange Revolution", The Wall Street Journal (USA), XXIII/184 (14 October 2005), 11.
- "The Ukraine's Tapegate Dilemma", The Salisbury Review (UK), 24/2 (Winter 2005), 15–17.
- "Russian Venom", The Wall Street Journal (USA), XXIV/208 (22 November 2006), 13.
- "License to Kill", The Wall Street Journal (USA), XXIV/228 (20 December 2006), 15.
- "Cosí gli 007 di Mosca hanno incastrato Scaramella", Il Giornale (Italy), XXXIV/26 (31 January 2007), 1–10, with Oleg Gordievsky.
- "Untangling the web of deception", The Spectator (UK), 303/9327 (19 May 2007), 38–40, with Oleg Gordievsky.
- "La guerra clandestine dei russi", Il Giornale (Italy), XXXIV/130 (2 June 2007), 1-14.
- "Terror's KGB Roots", The Wall Street Journal (USA), XXV/208 (23-25 November 2007), 11.
- ‘Murder Convictions’, History Today (UK), 60/3 (March 2010), 66.
- "Living a Lie", History Today (UK), 60/8 (August 2010), 39 – 45.
- "The threat from Russia's spies has only increased since the fall of Communism", The Spectator (UK), 325/9701 (2 August 2014), 15–17.
- "The Dark Arts of the Russian Prisoners", The Times (UK) 7 March, 2018.

=== Selected scientific articles ===
- "The KGB in Ann Arbor", American Intelligence Journal (USA), 30/1 (2012), 39–45.
- "Unknown Agabekov", Intelligence and National Security (UK), 28/6 (November 2013), 890–909.
- "Years of the Spy", American Intelligence Journal (USA), 31/2 (2013), 152–4.
- "Battleground London", American Intelligence Journal (USA), 33/2 (2016), 63–7.

== Honours, decorations, awards and distinctions ==
- Fellow of the Royal Historical Society
