= Hugo Portisch =

Austrian journalist (1927–2021)

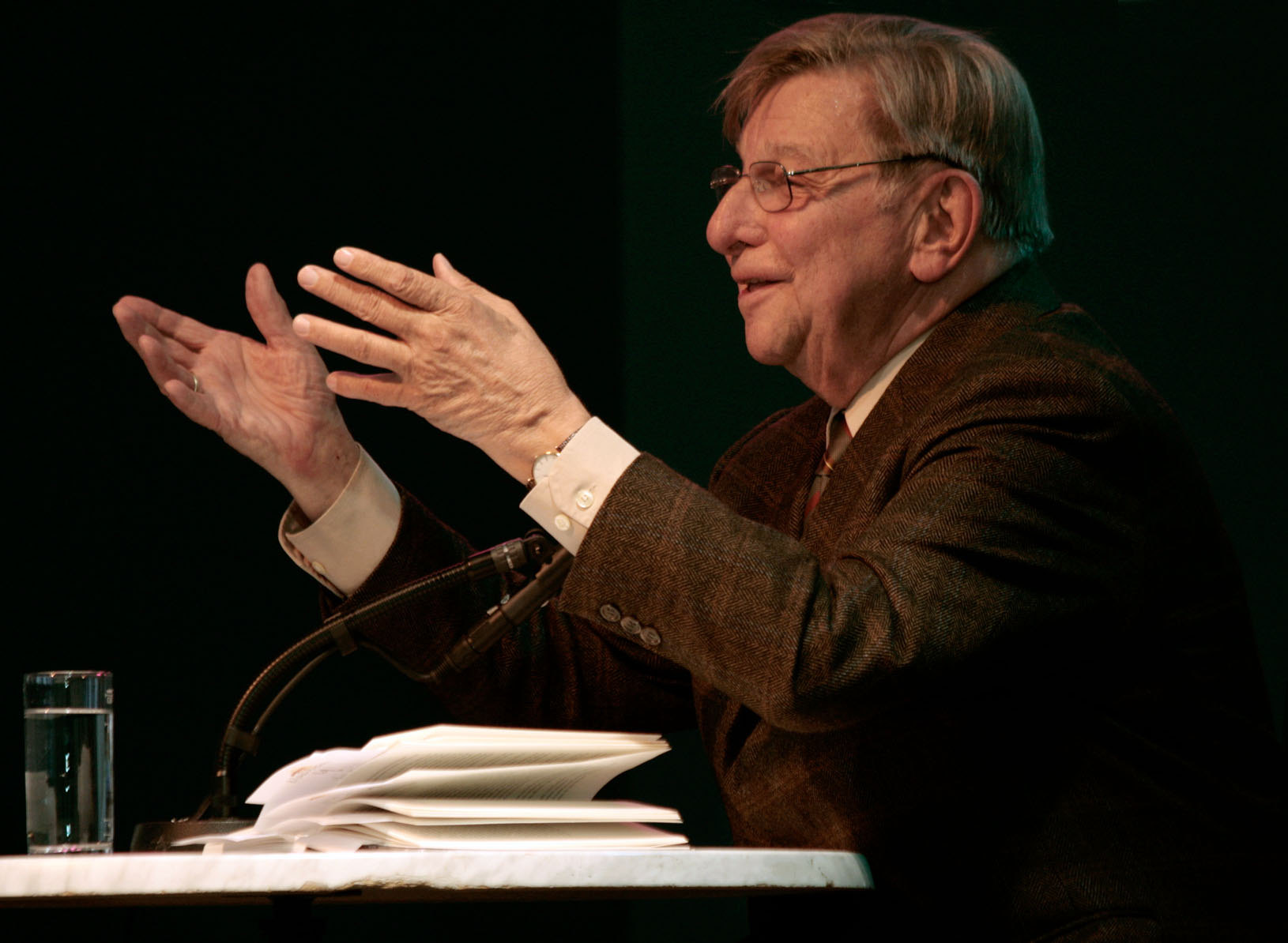
Portisch in 2009

Hugo Portisch (19 February 1927 – 1 April 2021) was a longstanding, broadly recognized and popular Austrian journalist, as well as a writer.

== Career ==
In 1963 Portisch, a Vienna newspaper editor, published an article attacking the system at state broadcaster ORF that in practice forbade all mention of politics. After more than 800,000 Austrians signed his petition, ORF was given editorial independence. Portisch became a leading television personality and documentarian, with a popular Saturday night program.

== Awards and honours ==
- 2010: Concordia Honorary Award
- 2012: Julius Raab Medal
- 2014: renewed Journalist of the Year Award for his life's work
- 2015: Viktor Frankl Prize
- 2016: Honorary Citizen of St. Pölten
- 2018: Honorary Citizen of the City of Vienna
- 2019: Grand Decoration of Honour in Gold for Services to the Republic of Austria

In October 2022, a part of Würzburggasse, a street in Vienna, was renamed in Portisch's honour. The location was chosen as the ORF is headquartered here: Its address thus changed to Hugo-Portisch-Gasse 1.
