= 1970 Austrian legislative election =

- 1 March 1970

All 165 seats in the National Council 83 seats needed for a majority
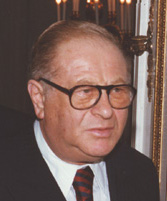

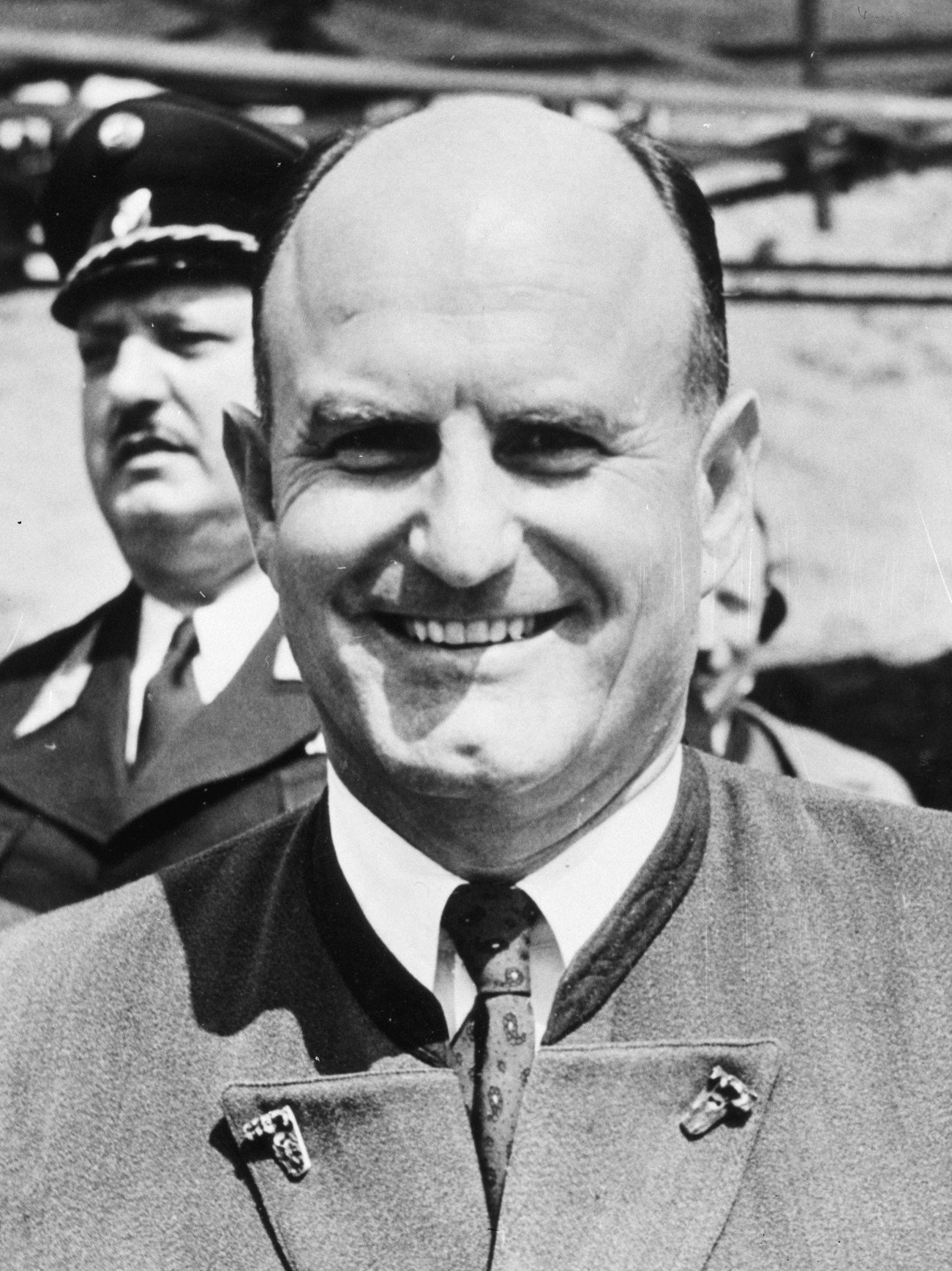

	First party	Second party	Third party
Leader	Bruno Kreisky	Josef Klaus	Friedrich Peter
Party	SPÖ	ÖVP	FPÖ
Last election	42.56%, 74 seats	48.35%, 85 seats	5.35%, 6 seats
Seats won	81	78	6
Seat change	▲7	▼7	Steady
Popular vote	2,221,981	2,051,012	253,425
Percentage	48.42%	44.69%	5.52%
Swing	▲5.86 pp	▼3.66 pp	▲0.17 pp
- Seats won by constituency and nationwide. Constituencies are shaded according to the most voted-for party.
Chancellor before election
Josef Klaus
ÖVP
Elected Chancellor
Bruno Kreisky
SPÖ

Parliamentary elections were held in Austria on 1 March 1970. The Socialist Party (SPÖ) emerged as the largest party in the National Council, winning 81 of the 165 seats, just two seats short of an absolute majority and the first time it had become the largest party during the Second Republic. Voter turnout was 92%.

After lengthy coalition negotiations with the Austrian People's Party (ÖVP), the SPÖ formed a minority government with the support of the Freedom Party of Austria (FPÖ). It is speculated that SPÖ leader Bruno Kreisky had this intention from the start and only negotiated with the ÖVP for appearances. It was the first Socialist-led government since 1920, and the first purely left-wing government in Austrian history. The SPÖ would lead the government for the next 29 years. Kreisky became Chancellor and would remain so until 1983. The Kreisky I government took office on 21 April 1970. Josef Klaus stepped down as ÖVP chairman in 1970 and his deputy Hermann Withalm succeeded him.

Early elections under a reformed electoral system were held the following year, with the number of seats increased to 183. They saw the SPÖ win an outright majority.

This was the first of eleven consecutive elections that saw the SPÖ emerge as the largest party — they would not fall behind another party until 2002. The SPÖ governed the country from this election until 4 February 2000, when the ÖVP's Wolfgang Schüssel had his government inaugurated in the aftermath of the 1999 elections, which saw the SPÖ retain largest party status but Schüssel govern due to support from the FPÖ.

== Results ==
Party	Votes	%	Seats	+/–
Socialist Party of Austria	2,221,981	48.42	81	+7
Austrian People's Party	2,051,012	44.69	78	–7
Freedom Party of Austria	253,425	5.52	6	0
Communist Party of Austria	44,750	0.98	0	0
Democratic Progressive Party	14,925	0.33	0	0
National Democratic Party	2,631	0.06	0	New
Adolf Glantschnig – For Humanity, Law and Freedom in Austria	237	0.01	0	New
Total	4,588,961	100.00	165	0
Valid votes	4,588,961	99.10		
Invalid/blank votes	41,890	0.90		
Total votes	4,630,851	100.00		
Registered voters/turnout	5,045,841	91.78		
Source: Nohlen & Stöver

=== Results by state ===
State	SPÖ	ÖVP	FPÖ	KPÖ	DFP	Others
Burgenland	48.8	48.1	2.7	0.4	-	-
Carinthia	53.2	35.7	9.7	1.2	0.2	-
Lower Austria	45.2	50.9	2.7	0.9	0.2	0.1
Upper Austria	46.5	46.0	6.7	0.6	0.1	0.2
Salzburg	42.5	43.6	13.0	0.6	0.1	
Styria	47.9	45.6	5.0	1.2	0.2	0.1
Tyrol	35.9	57.9	5.5	0.4	0.2	-
Vorarlberg	31.0	54.7	13.6	0.5	0.2	-
Vienna	58.7	34.9	4.1	1.5	0.8	-
Austria	48.4	44.7	5.5	1.0	0.3	0.1
Source: Institute for Social Research and Consulting (SORA)
