= 1966 Austrian legislative election =

← 1962	6 March 1966	1970 →

All 165 seats in the National Council 83 seats needed for a majority
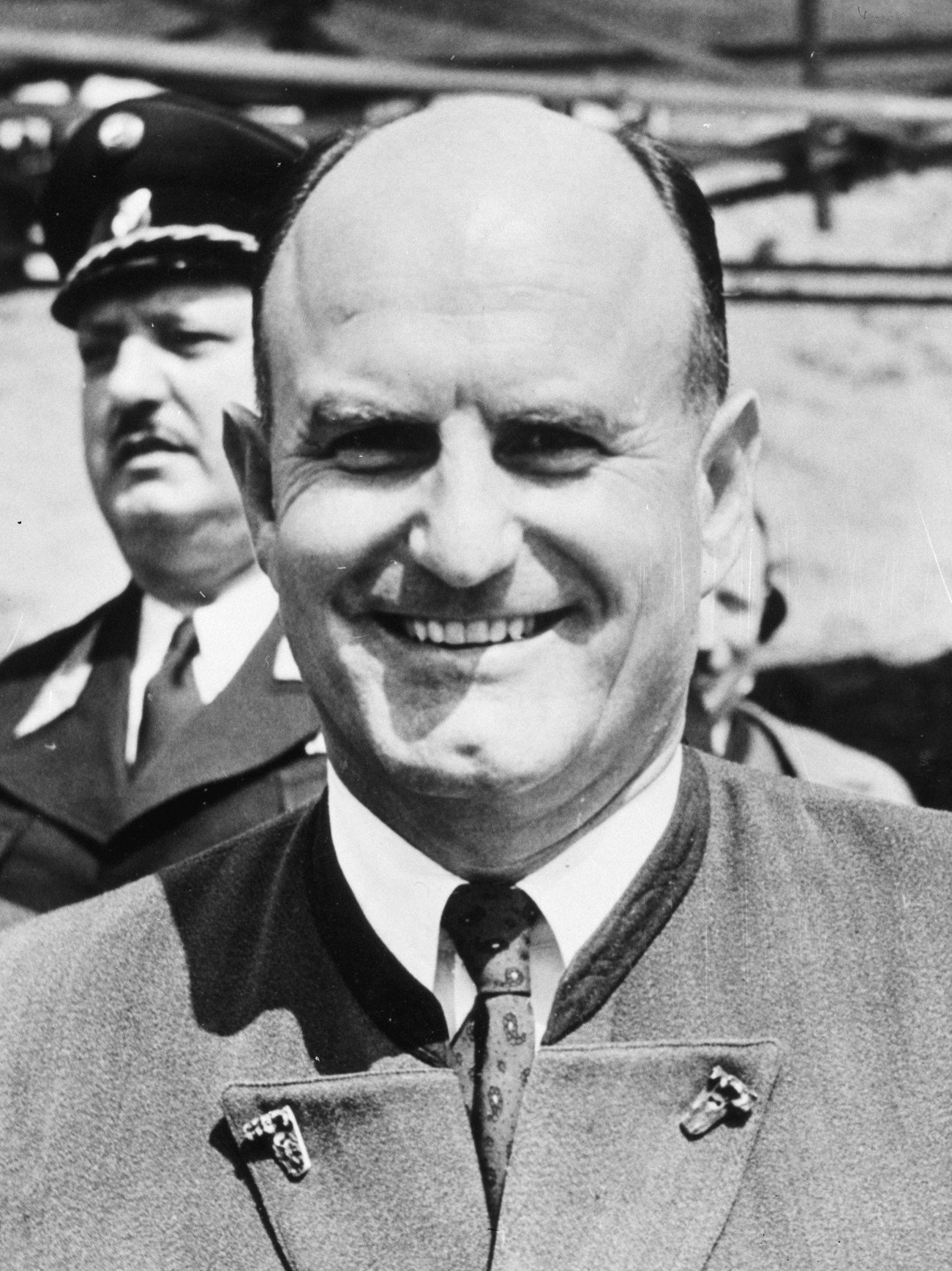

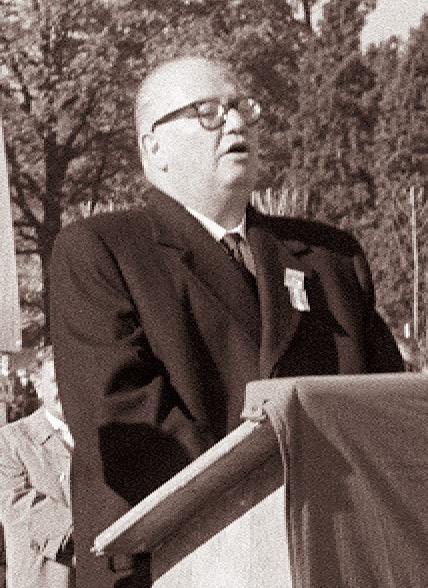

	First party	Second party	Third party
Leader	Josef Klaus	Bruno Pittermann	Friedrich Peter
Party	ÖVP	SPÖ	FPÖ
Last election	45.43%, 81 seats	44.00%, 76 seats	7.04%, 8 seats
Seats won	85	74	6
Seat change	▲4	▼2	▼2
Popular vote	2,191,109	1,928,985	242,570
Percentage	48.35%	42.56%	5.35%
Swing	▲2.92 pp	▼1.44 pp	▼1.69 pp
- Seats won by constituency and nationwide. Constituencies are shaded according to the most voted-for party.
Chancellor before election
Josef Klaus
ÖVP
Elected Chancellor
Josef Klaus
ÖVP

Parliamentary elections were held in Austria on 6 March 1966. The result was a victory for the Austrian People's Party (ÖVP), which won 85 of the 165 seats. Voter turnout was 94%.

During the campaign, ÖVP Chancellor Josef Klaus (who had succeeded Alfons Gorbach in 1964) had called for an end to the grand coalition with the Socialist Party of Austria (SPÖ) that had governed since 1945. The election results seemingly left Klaus free to break off the coalition; the ÖVP won an outright majority of three seats, enough to govern alone. However, Klaus reversed himself and proposed a new coalition agreement. The SPÖ leadership supported a renewed coalition, but talks failed when the SPÖ rank and file balked at the proposed coalition terms. Klaus then formed an exclusively ÖVP cabinet, the first one-party government of the Second Republic. It was also the first purely centre-right government in Austria since before World War II.

As of the 2024 elections, this is the only time in the ÖVP's history where it has governed in a single-party majority. The ÖVP had won a majority of seats once before, during the first postwar election in 1945, but opted to lead a grand coalition rather than govern alone.

== Results ==
Party	Votes	%	Seats	+/–
Austrian People's Party	2,191,109	48.35	85	+4
Socialist Party of Austria	1,928,985	42.56	74	–2
Freedom Party of Austria	242,570	5.35	6	–2
Democratic Progressive Party	148,528	3.28	0	New
Communists and Left Socialists	18,636	0.41	0	0
Liberal Party of Austria	1,571	0.03	0	New
Marxist–Leninist Party of Austria	486	0.01	0	New
Total	4,531,885	100.00	165	0
Valid votes	4,531,885	98.86		
Invalid/blank votes	52,085	1.14		
Total votes	4,583,970	100.00		
Registered voters/turnout	4,886,818	93.80		
Source: Nohlen & Stöver

=== Results by state ===
State	ÖVP	SPÖ	FPÖ	DFP	Others
Burgenland	51.2	45.4	2.4	0.9	0.1
Carinthia	37.0	49.6	11.5	2.0	-
Lower Austria	54.0	41.4	2.3	2.2	-
Upper Austria	51.3	40.3	6.4	1.9	0.1
Salzburg	48.1	36.1	12.5	3.3	-
Styria	49.7	43.8	4.9	1.6	0.0
Tyrol	64.5	28.2	4.9	2.2	0.2
Vorarlberg	61.8	22.1	12.9	3	-
Vienna	37.9	49.4	4.0	7.0	1.7
Austria	48.4	42.6	5.4	3.3	0.5
Source: Institute for Social Research and Consulting (SORA)
