= Franz Löschnak =

Austrian jurist and politician

Franz Löschnak (born March 4, 1940, in Vienna) is an Austrian jurist and politician for the SPÖ. From 1987 to 1989 he was Secretary of Health in the federal government and from 1989 to 1995 he was head of the Federal Ministry of the Interior (Austria).

== Life and work ==
After graduating from high school in 1958, Loeschnak went to Law School at the University of Vienna. There he obtained the title of LLD. From 1959 to 1977, he worked for the City of Vienna. In 1989 Loeschnak became the vice party chairman of the Austrian Socialist Party. For this party, he was also a Member of Parliament.

=== Austrian Holocaust Memorial Service ===
After historian Andreas Maislinger developed the idea for the Austrian Holocaust Memorial Service, Loeschnak formed its legal base. On September 1, 1992, the first Austrian Holocaust Memorial Servant started his service at the Auschwitz-Birkenau State Museum.

== Awards ==
- Decoration of Honour for Services to the Republic of Austria
- Order of Leopold II
