= Democratic Progressive Party (Austria) =

Defunct political party in Austria

The Democratic Progressive Party (German: Demokratische Fortschrittliche Partei, DFP) was a right-wing populist political party in Austria. The DFP was founded in September 1965 by former Austrian Trade Union Federation chairman and Minister of the Interior Franz Olah upon his expulsion from the Socialist Party of Austria. The party was known for its leader's antisemitic rhetoric, and received almost 150,000 votes in the 1966 legislative election, in which it failed to win a seat in the Federal Council. The party disbanded in 1970.
