= Government of Austria =

Government of the Republic of Austria Bundesregierung der Republik Österreich
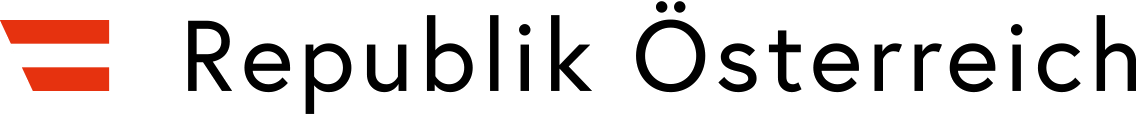
- Graphic charter logo in German
- Jurisdiction: Austria

History
- Established: 31 October 1918 (107 years ago)

Composition
- Ministries: 15

Authority and accountability
- Appointed by: President

Operations
- Website: www.bundeskanzleramt.gv.at

Seat
- Chancellery

The Government of Austria (German: Bundesregierung der Republik Österreich) is the executive cabinet of the Republic of Austria. It consists of the chancellor, who is the head of government, the vice chancellor and the ministers.

== Appointment ==
Since the 1929 reform of the Austrian Constitution, all members of the Federal Government are appointed by the Austrian Federal President. As the Federal Government must maintain the confidence of parliament, the President must generally abide by the will of that body in their appointments. In practice, the leader of the strongest political party, who ran as a "chancellor candidate" in a parliamentary election, is usually asked to become Federal Chancellor, though there have been some exceptions. Ministers are proposed for nomination by the Chancellor, though the President is permitted to withhold approval. Likewise, the President may dismiss the Chancellor and/or the whole government at any time. If this occurs, a new government must then be formed by the parties that control parliament.

== Meetings ==
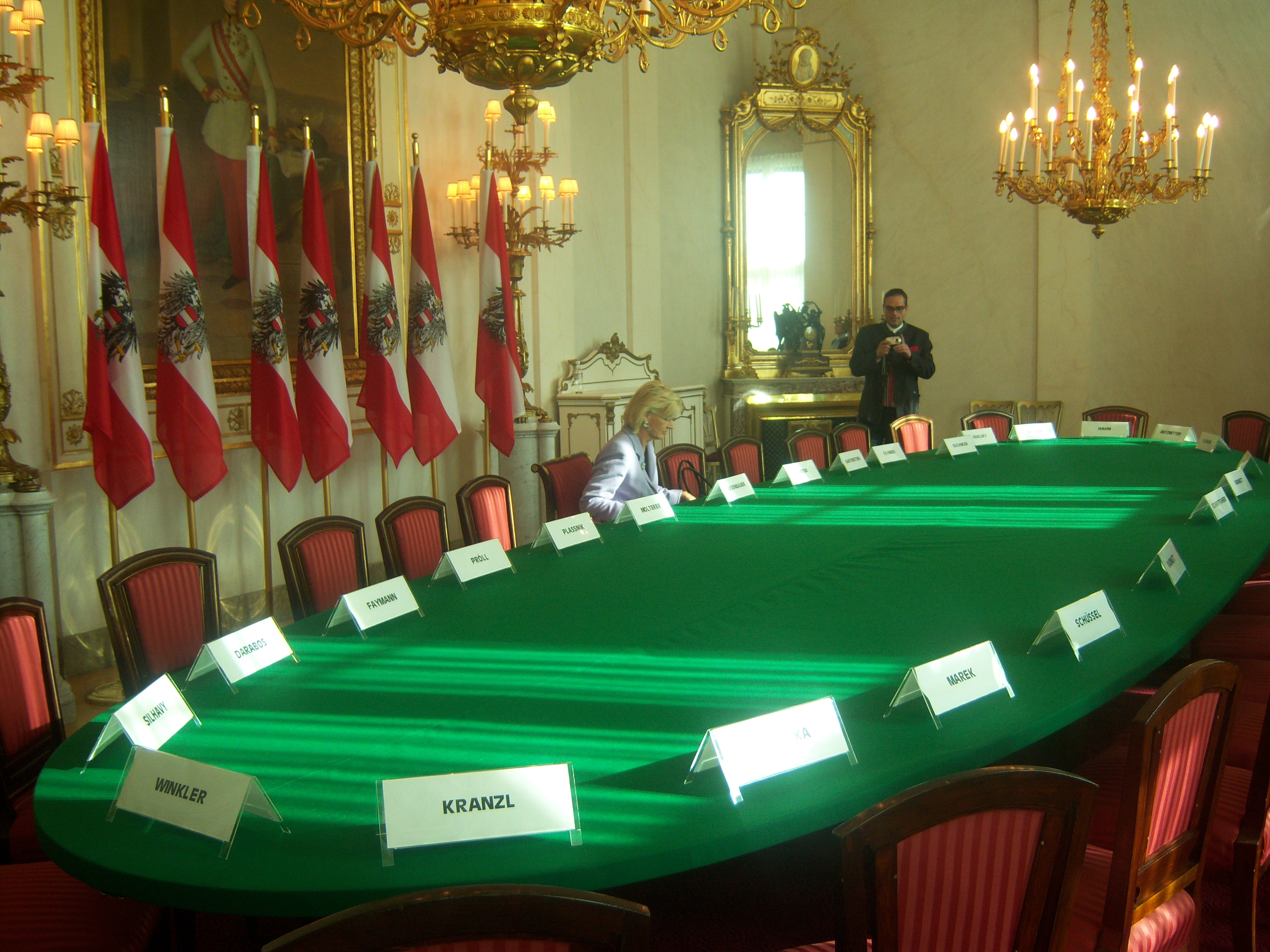
Cabinet room in the Austrian Chancellery

The government is convened for frequently scheduled meetings. When formally convened as such, the government is termed the Council of Ministers (German: Ministerrat), which is equivalent to the word "cabinet". The Chancellor presides over cabinet meetings as first among equals without decisional authority, regardless of his right of proposal concerning the appointment of the government's members by the President. The cabinet adopts resolutions in the presence of at least half of its members and, according to the ruling of the Austrian Constitutional Court, unanimously – in particular the introduction of bills to the National Council. Each federal minister is also responsible for their own ministry, and may be supported by one or more state secretaries, who also participate in the cabinet's meetings. State secretaries are not considered members of the government, and have no right to vote during cabinet meetings.

== Federal Ministries ==
There are currently twelve Federal Ministries that all make up the Austrian cabinet.

- Federal Chancellery
- Federal Ministry for Arts, Culture, the Civil Service and Sport
- Federal Ministry for Agriculture, Forestry, Regions and Water Management
- Federal Ministry for Climate Action, Environment, Energy, Mobility, Innovation and Technology
- Federal Ministry of Defence
- Federal Ministry of Education, Science and Research
- Federal Ministry of European and International Affairs
- Federal Ministry of Finance
- Federal Ministry of the Interior
- Federal Ministry of Justice
- Federal Ministry of Labour and Economy
- Federal Ministry of Social Affairs, Health, Care and Consumer Protection

== History ==
=== First Republic ===
After the dissolution of the Austro-Hungarian Monarchy, on 30 October 1918 the provisional national assembly of German Austria elected a State Council (Staatsrat) executive, which itself appointed a state government with the Social Democratic politician Karl Renner as head of the State Chancellery. The Renner ministry was composed of representatives of the three main political parties—Social Democrats, the Christian Social Party (CS) and German Nationalists (Greater Germans)—according to the Proporz doctrine. As acting executive body it remained in office until the Constitutional Assembly of the Austrian First Republic on 15 March 1919 elected Renner's second cabinet, a coalition government of Social Democratic and Christian Social ministers.

State Chancellor Renner had signed the Treaty of Saint-Germain-en-Laye, whereafter his cabinet retired en bloc. Re-elected by the Constitutional Assembly on 17 October 1919, his third cabinet was finally overturned with the break-up of the SPÖ-CS coalition on 7 July 1920. Renner was succeeded by the Christian Social politician Michael Mayr, who at the commencement of the Austria Constitution on 10 November 1920 became first Federal Chancellor of Austria. Mayr and his successors proceeded with the support of the Christian Social Party and the Greater German nationalists, while the Social Democrats remained in opposition.

From 5 March 1933 onwards, the Christian Social chancellor Engelbert Dollfuß continued to rule by suppressing the National Council parliament. In the course of the Austrian Civil War he brought down the opposition, and on 1 May 1934 implemented the authoritarian Federal State of Austria. All political parties were banned, except for the Fatherland's Front supporting Dollfuß' Austrofascist government. The Federal Government ceased at the Anschluss (the incorporation of Austria into Nazi Germany) on 13 March 1938.

=== Second Republic ===
On 27 April 1945 a provisional Austrian national unity government, again under State Chancellor Karl Renner, declared the Anschluss null and void. It prepared the elections to the Austrian National Council held on 25 November. On 20 December 1945, the Austrian Constitution was officially re-enacted, with ÖVP founder Leopold Figl forming the first post-war Federal Government.

List of cabinets since 1945:

Governments of Austria
Name of Government	Duration of Government	Chancellor	Vice-Chancellor	Parties Involved	Election
Renner	April 27, 1945 – December 20, 1945	Karl Renner^{1}	N/A	ÖVP, SPÖ, KPÖ	none
Figl I	December 20, 1945 – November 8, 1949	Leopold Figl (ÖVP)	Adolf Schärf (SPÖ)	ÖVP, SPÖ, KPÖ	1945
Figl II	November 8, 1949 – October 28, 1952	Leopold Figl (ÖVP)	Adolf Schärf (SPÖ)	ÖVP, SPÖ	1949
Figl III	October 28, 1952 – April 2, 1953	Leopold Figl (ÖVP)	Adolf Schärf (SPÖ)	ÖVP, SPÖ	1949
Raab I	April 2, 1953 – June 29, 1956	Julius Raab (ÖVP)	Adolf Schärf (SPÖ)	ÖVP, SPÖ	1953
Raab II	June 29, 1956 – July 16, 1959	Julius Raab (ÖVP)	Adolf Schärf (SPÖ), Bruno Pittermann (SPÖ)²	ÖVP, SPÖ	1956
Raab III	July 16, 1959 – November 3, 1960	Julius Raab (ÖVP)	Bruno Pittermann (SPÖ)	ÖVP, SPÖ	1959
Raab IV	November 3, 1960 – April 11, 1961	Julius Raab (ÖVP)	Bruno Pittermann (SPÖ)	ÖVP, SPÖ	1959
Gorbach I	April 11, 1961 – March 27, 1963	Alfons Gorbach (ÖVP)	Bruno Pittermann (SPÖ)	ÖVP, SPÖ	1959
Gorbach II	March 27, 1963 – April 2, 1964	Alfons Gorbach (ÖVP)	Bruno Pittermann (SPÖ)	ÖVP, SPÖ	1962
Klaus I	April 2, 1964 – April 19, 1966	Josef Klaus (ÖVP)	Bruno Pittermann (SPÖ)	ÖVP, SPÖ	1962
Klaus II	April 19, 1966 – April 21, 1970	Josef Klaus (ÖVP)	Fritz Bock (ÖVP), Hermann Withalm (ÖVP)³	ÖVP	1966
Kreisky I	April 21, 1970 – November 4, 1971	Bruno Kreisky (SPÖ)	Rudolf Häuser (SPÖ)	SPÖ	1970
Kreisky II	November 4, 1971 – October 28, 1975	Bruno Kreisky (SPÖ)	Rudolf Häuser (SPÖ)	SPÖ	1971
Kreisky III	October 28, 1975 – June 5, 1979	Bruno Kreisky (SPÖ)	Rudolf Häuser (SPÖ), Hannes Androsch (SPÖ)^{4}	SPÖ	1975
Kreisky IV	June 5, 1979 – May 24, 1983	Bruno Kreisky (SPÖ)	Hannes Androsch (SPÖ), Fred Sinowatz (SPÖ)^{5}	SPÖ	1979
Sinowatz	May 24, 1983 – June 16, 1986	Fred Sinowatz (SPÖ)	Norbert Steger (FPÖ)	SPÖ, FPÖ	1983
Vranitzky I	June 16, 1986 – January 21, 1987	Franz Vranitzky (SPÖ)	Norbert Steger (FPÖ)	SPÖ, FPÖ	1983
Vranitzky II	January 21, 1987 – December 17, 1990	Franz Vranitzky (SPÖ)	Alois Mock (ÖVP), Josef Riegler (ÖVP)^{6}	SPÖ, ÖVP	1986
Vranitzky III	December 17, 1990 – November 29, 1994	Franz Vranitzky (SPÖ)	Josef Riegler (ÖVP), Erhard Busek (ÖVP)^{7}	SPÖ, ÖVP	1990
Vranitzky IV	November 29, 1994 – March 12, 1996	Franz Vranitzky (SPÖ)	Erhard Busek (ÖVP), Wolfgang Schüssel (ÖVP)^{8}	SPÖ, ÖVP	1994
Vranitzky V	March 12, 1996 – January 28, 1997	Franz Vranitzky (SPÖ)	Wolfgang Schüssel (ÖVP)	SPÖ, ÖVP	1995
Klima	January 28, 1997 – February 4, 2000	Viktor Klima (SPÖ)	Wolfgang Schüssel (ÖVP)	SPÖ, ÖVP	1995
Schüssel I	February 4, 2000 – February 28, 2003	Wolfgang Schüssel (ÖVP)	Susanne Riess-Passer (FPÖ)	ÖVP, FPÖ	1999
Schüssel II	February 28, 2003 – January 11, 2007	Wolfgang Schüssel (ÖVP)	Herbert Haupt (FPÖ), Hubert Gorbach (FPÖ/BZÖ)^{9}	ÖVP, FPÖ, BZÖ	2002
Gusenbauer	January 11, 2007 – December 2, 2008	Alfred Gusenbauer (SPÖ)	Wilhelm Molterer (ÖVP)	SPÖ, ÖVP	2006
Faymann I	December 2, 2008 – December 16, 2013	Werner Faymann (SPÖ)	Josef Pröll (ÖVP), Michael Spindelegger (ÖVP)^{10}	SPÖ, ÖVP	2008
Faymann II	December 16, 2013 – May 9, 2016	Werner Faymann (SPÖ)	Michael Spindelegger (ÖVP), Reinhold Mitterlehner (ÖVP)^{11}	SPÖ, ÖVP	2013
Kern	May 17, 2016 – December 18, 2017	Christian Kern (SPÖ)	Reinhold Mitterlehner (ÖVP), Wolfgang Brandstetter (ÖVP)^{12}	SPÖ, ÖVP	2013
Kurz I	December 18, 2017 – May 28, 2019	Sebastian Kurz (ÖVP)	Heinz-Christian Strache (FPÖ), Hartwig Löger (ÖVP)^{13}	ÖVP, FPÖ	2017
Bierlein	June 3, 2019 – January 7, 2020	Brigitte Bierlein (Ind.)	Clemens Jabloner (Ind.)	none	2017
Kurz II	January 7, 2020 – October 11, 2021	Sebastian Kurz (ÖVP)	Werner Kogler (Grüne)	ÖVP, Grüne	2019
Schallenberg	October 11, 2021 – December 6, 2021	Alexander Schallenberg (ÖVP)	Werner Kogler (Grüne)	ÖVP, Grüne	2019
Nehammer	December 6, 2021 – January 9, 2025	Karl Nehammer (ÖVP)	Werner Kogler (Grüne)	ÖVP, Grüne	2019
Stocker	March 3, 2025 –	Christian Stocker (ÖVP)	Andreas Babler (SPÖ)	ÖVP, SPÖ, NEOS	2024
Notes 1) Karl Renner acted only as a supervisor of the provisional government 2) As Adolf Schärf was elected as the President of Austria, Bruno Pittermann acted as the vice-chancellor from May 22, 1957. 3) From January 19, 1968, afterwards, Hermann Withalm acted as the vice-chancellor. 4) Rudolf Häuser acted as the vice-chancellor until September 30, 1976. From October 1, 1976, Hannes Androsch acted as the vice-chancellor. 5) Fred Sinowatz acted as the vice-chancellor from January 20, 1981. 6) Until April 24, 1989, Alois Mock acted as the vice-chancellor. From April 24, 1989, Josef Riegler acted as the vice-chancellor. 7) From July 2, 1991, Erhard Busek acted as the vice-chancellor. 8) From May 4, 1995, Wolfgang Schüssel acted as the vice-chancellor. 9) Until October 20, 2003, Herbert Haupt acted as the vice-chancellor. From October 21, 2003, Hubert Gorbach acted as the vice-chancellor. Until April 17, 2005, Gorbach's party affiliation was FPÖ, then BZÖ. 10) Until April 20, 2011, Josef Pröll acted as the vice-chancellor. From April 21, 2011, Michael Spindelegger acted as the vice-chancellor. 11) Until September 1, 2014, Michael Spindelegger acted as the vice-chancellor. From September 1, 2014, Reinhold Mitterlehner acted as the vice-chancellor. Mitterlehner was also acting chancellor from May 9, 2016, until May 17, 2016. 12) Until May 17, 2017, Reinhold Mitterlehner acted as the vice-chancellor. From May 17, 2017, Wolfgang Brandstetter acted as the vice-chancellor. 13) Until May 22, 2019, Heinz-Christian Strache acted as the vice-chancellor. From May 22, 2019, Hartwig Löger acted as the vice-chancellor. Löger was also acting chancellor from May 28, 2019, until June 3, 2019.
Traditional colours
Austrian People's Party (Österreichische Volkspartei, ÖVP)
Social Democratic Party of Austria (Sozialdemokratische Partei Österreichs, SPÖ), until 1991: Socialist Party of Austria
Communist Party of Austria (Kommunistische Partei Österreichs, KPÖ)
Freedom Party of Austria (Freiheitliche Partei Österreichs, FPÖ)
Alliance for the Future of Austria (Bündnis Zukunft Österreich, BZÖ)
The Greens – The Green Alternative (Die Grünen, Grüne)
Independent
Source: Kanzler und Regierungen seit 1945. Federal Chancellery of Austria Web Site. Vienna, Federal Chancellery of Austria 2006. German English
