= List of ministers of transport (Austria) =

Minister of Transport
- Bundesminister für Verkehr
- Coat of arms

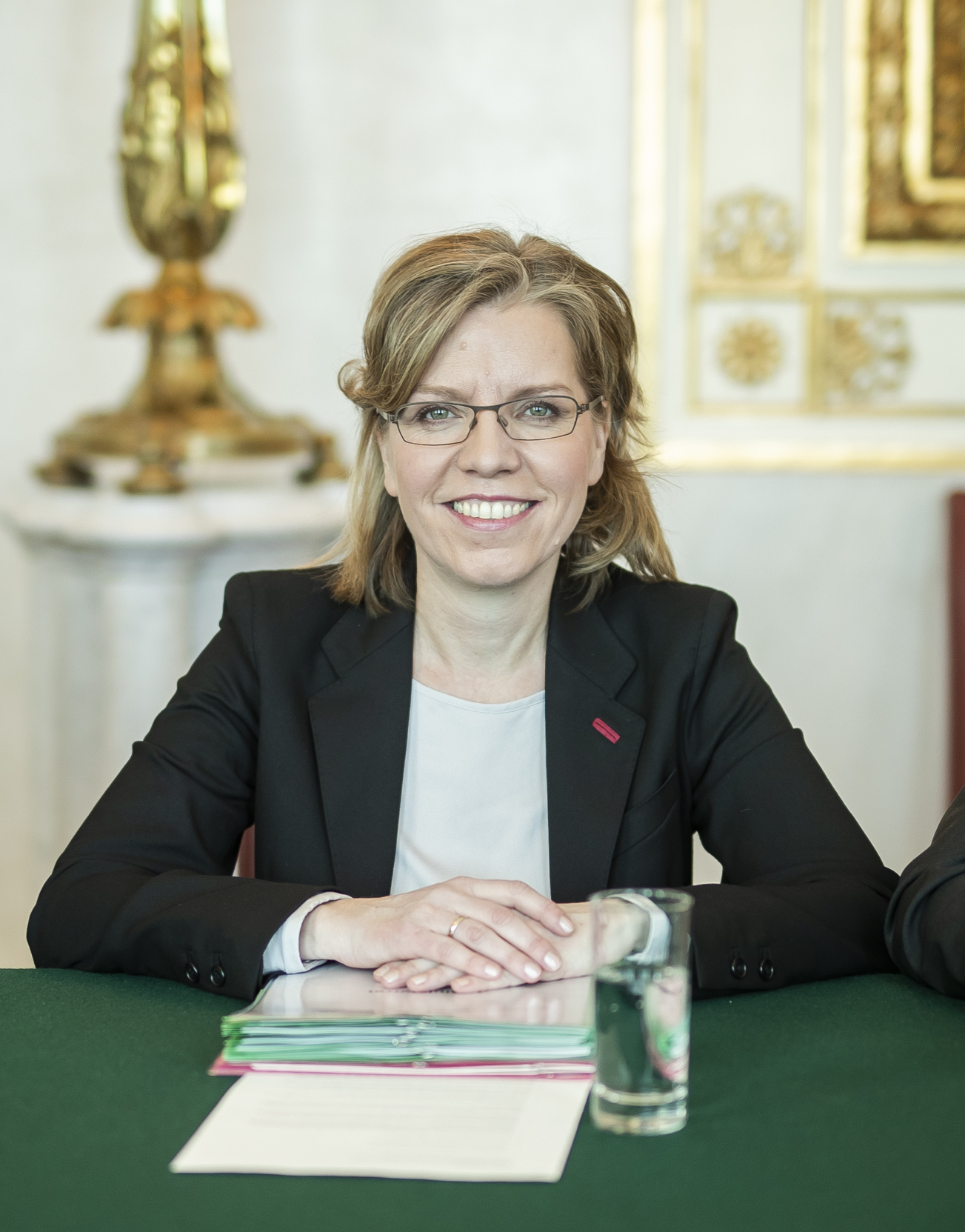
- Incumbent; Leonore Gewessler since 7 January 2020
- Federal Ministry for Climate Action, Environment, Energy, Mobility, Innovation and Technology
- Style: Ms. Minister (normal); Her Excellency (diplomatic)
- Type: Minister
- Status: Supreme executive organ
- Member of: Cabinet
- Seat: Ministry of Transport; Stubenring 1, Innere Stadt, Vienna
- Nominator: Political parties
- Appointer: The president on advice of the chancellor
- Constituting instrument: Constitution of Austria
- First holder: Carl Jukel
- Website: www.bmvit.gv.at (in German)

The minister of transport of Austria (German: Bundesminister für Verkehr) heads the Federal Ministry for Climate Action, Environment, Energy, Mobility, Innovation and Technology.

== Ministers ==
=== First Republic ===
№	Portrait	Name (Born-Died)	Term			Political Party	Government
№	Portrait	Name (Born-Died)	Took office	Left office (Note: Based on when the successor took office)	Duration	Political Party	Government
State Secretariat of Transport (Staatsamt für Verkehrswesen)
1	Carl Jukel [de]	Carl Jukel (1865–1931)	30 October 1918	15 March 1919	136 days	CS	Renner I Cabinet
2	Ludwig Paul [de]	Ludwig Paul (1864–1920)	15 March 1919	1 July 1920 †	1 year, 108 days	Independent	Renner II Cabinet–II
–	Ferdinand Hanusch	Ferdinand Hanusch (1866–1923); Acting	1 July 1920	7 July 1920	6 days	SDAPÖ	Renner III Cabinet
3	Karl Pesta [de]	Karl Pesta (1871–1945)	7 July 1920	20 November 1920	136 days	Independent	Mayr I Cabinet
Ministry of Transport (Bundesministerium für Verkehrswesen)
3	Karl Pesta [de]	Karl Pesta (1871–1945)	20 November 1920	21 June 1921	213 days	Independent	Mayr II Cabinet
4	Walther Rodler [de]	Walther Rodler (1867–1931)	21 June 1921	31 May 1922	344 days	CS	Schober I Cabinet; Breisky Cabinet; Schober II Cabinet
5	Franz Odehnal [de]	Franz Odehnal (1870–1928)	31 May 1922	17 April 1923	321 days	CS	Seipel I Cabinet
Ministry of Commerce and Transport (Bundesministerium für Handel und Verkehr)
6	Hans Schürff [de]	Hans Schürff (1875–1939)	17 April 1923	26 September 1929	6 years, 162 days	GDVP	Seipel II–III; Ramek I Cabinet–II; Seipel IV–V; Streeruwitz Cabinet
7	Michael Hainisch	Michael Hainisch (1858–1940)	26 September 1929	17 June 1930	264 days	Independent	Schober III Cabinet
–	Johann Schober	Johann Schober (1874–1932); Acting	17 June 1930	20 June 1930	3 days	Independent	Schober III Cabinet
8	Friedrich Schuster [de]	Friedrich Schuster (1863–1932)	20 June 1930	30 September 1930	102 days	Independent	Schober III Cabinet
9	Eduard Heinl	Eduard Heinl (1880–1957)	30 September 1930	21 September 1932	1 year, 357 days	CS	Vaugoin Cabinet; Ender Cabinet; Buresch I Cabinet–II; Dollfuss I Cabinet
10	Guido Jakoncig [de]	Guido Jakoncig (1895–1972)	21 September 1932	10 May 1933	231 days	Heimatblock	Dollfuss II Cabinet
11	Friedrich Stockinger [de]	Friedrich Stockinger (1894–1968)	10 May 1933	3 November 1936	3 years, 177 days	VF	Dollfuss II Cabinet; Schuschnigg I Cabinet–II
12	Wilhelm Taucher [de]	Wilhelm Taucher (1892–1962)	3 November 1936	16 February 1938	1 year, 105 days	VF	Schuschnigg III Cabinet
13	Julius Raab	Julius Raab (1891–1964)	16 February 1938	11 March 1938	23 days	VF	Schuschnigg IV Cabinet
14	Hans Fischböck	Hans Fischböck (1895–1967)	11 March 1938	13 March 1938	2 days	NSDAP	Seyss-Inquart Cabinet

=== Second Republic ===
№	Portrait	Name (Born-Died)	Term			Political Party	Government
№	Portrait	Name (Born-Died)	Took office	Left office	Duration	Political Party	Government
Ministry of Transport (Bundesministerium für Verkehr)
1	Vinzenz Übeleis [de]	Vinzenz Übeleis (1889–1967)	20 December 1945	8 November 1949	3 years, 323 days	SPÖ	Figl I Cabinet
Ministry of Transport and Nationalized Industry (Bundesministerium für Verkehr und verstaatlichte Betriebe)
2	Karl Waldbrunner [de]	Karl Waldbrunner (1906–1980)	8 November 1949	29 June 1956	6 years, 234 days	SPÖ	Figl II Cabinet–II; Raab I Cabinet
Ministry of Transport and Electricity (Bundesministerium für Verkehr und Elektrizitätswirtschaft)
2	Karl Waldbrunner [de]	Karl Waldbrunner (1906–1980)	29 June 1956	14 December 1962	6 years, 168 days	SPÖ	Raab II Cabinet–II–III; Gorbach I Cabinet
–	Bruno Pittermann	Bruno Pittermann (1905–1983); Acting	14 December 1962	27 March 1963	103 days	SPÖ	Gorbach I Cabinet
3	Otto Probst	Otto Probst (1911–1978)	27 March 1963	19 April 1966	3 years, 23 days	SPÖ	Gorbach II Cabinet; Klaus I Cabinet
Ministry of Transport and Nationalized Enterprise (Bundesministerium für Verkehr und verstaatlichte Unternehmungen)
4	Ludwig Weiß [de]	Ludwig Weiß (1902–1994)	19 April 1966	21 April 1970	4 years, 2 days	ÖVP	Klaus II Cabinet
5	Erwin Frühbauer [de]	Erwin Frühbauer (1926–2010)	21 April 1970	24 July 1970	94 days	SPÖ	Kreisky I Cabinet
Ministry of Transport (Bundesministerium für Verkehr)
5	Erwin Frühbauer [de]	Erwin Frühbauer (1926–2010)	24 July 1970	17 December 1973	3 years, 146 days	SPÖ	Kreisky I Cabinet–II
6	Erwin Lanc	Erwin Lanc (1930–2025)	17 December 1973	8 June 1977	3 years, 173 days	SPÖ	Kreisky II Cabinet–II
7	Karl Lausecker [de]	Karl Lausecker (1928–2015)	8 June 1977	10 September 1984	7 years, 94 days	SPÖ	Kreisky III Cabinet–II; Sinowatz Cabinet
8	Ferdinand Lacina	Ferdinand Lacina (born 1942)	10 September 1984	1 January 1985	113 days	SPÖ	Sinowatz Cabinet
Ministry of Public Economy and Transport (Bundesministerium für öffentliche Wirtschaft und Verkehr)
8	Ferdinand Lacina	Ferdinand Lacina (born 1942)	1 January 1985	16 June 1986	1 year, 166 days	SPÖ	Sinowatz Cabinet
9	Rudolf Streicher	Rudolf Streicher (born 1939)	16 June 1986	3 April 1992	5 years, 292 days	SPÖ	Vranitzky I Cabinet–II–III
10	Viktor Klima	Viktor Klima (born 1947)	3 April 1992	12 March 1996	3 years, 344 days	SPÖ	Vranitzky III Cabinet–II
–	Rudolf Scholten [de]	Rudolf Scholten (born 1955); Acting	12 March 1996	1 May 1996	50 days	SPÖ	Vranitzky V Cabinet
Ministry of Science, Transport and the Arts (Bundesministerium für Wissenschaft, Verkehr und Kunst)
11	Rudolf Scholten [de]	Rudolf Scholten (born 1955)	1 May 1996	28 January 1997	272 days	SPÖ	Vranitzky V Cabinet
12	Caspar Einem	Caspar Einem (1948–2021)	28 January 1997	15 February 1997	18 days	SPÖ	Klima Cabinet
Ministry of Science and Transport (Bundesministerium für Wissenschaft und Verkehr)
12	Caspar Einem	Caspar Einem (1948–2021)	15 February 1997	4 February 2000	2 years, 354 days	SPÖ	Klima Cabinet
13	Michael Schmid [de]	Michael Schmid (born 1945)	4 February 2000	1 April 2000	57 days	FPÖ	Schüssel I Cabinet
Ministry of Transport, Innovation and Technology (Bundesministerium für Verkehr, Innovation und Technologie)
13	Michael Schmid [de]	Michael Schmid (born 1945)	1 April 2000	14 November 2000	227 days	FPÖ	Schüssel I Cabinet
14	Monika Forstinger	Monika Forstinger (born 1963)	14 November 2000	19 February 2002	1 year, 97 days	FPÖ	Schüssel I Cabinet
15	Mathias Reichhold [de]	Mathias Reichhold (born 1957)	19 February 2002	28 February 2003	1 year, 9 days	FPÖ	Schüssel I Cabinet
16	Hubert Gorbach	Hubert Gorbach (born 1956)	28 February 2003	11 January 2007	3 years, 317 days	FPÖ	Schüssel II Cabinet
17	Werner Faymann	Werner Faymann (born 1960)	11 January 2007	2 December 2008	1 year, 326 days	SPÖ	Gusenbauer Cabinet
18	Doris Bures	Doris Bures (born 1962)	2 December 2008	1 September 2014	5 years, 273 days	SPÖ	Faymann I Cabinet–II
19	Alois Stöger	Alois Stöger (born 1960)	1 September 2014	26 January 2016	1 year, 147 days	SPÖ	Faymann II Cabinet
20	Gerald Klug	Gerald Klug (born 1968)	26 January 2016	18 May 2016	113 days	SPÖ	Faymann II Cabinet
21	Jörg Leichtfried	Jörg Leichtfried (born 1967)	18 May 2016	18 December 2017	1 year, 214 days	SPÖ	Kern Cabinet
22	Norbert Hofer	Norbert Hofer (born 1971)	18 December 2017	20 May 2019	1 year, 132 days	FPÖ	Kurz I Cabinet
23	Valerie Hackl	Valerie Hackl (born 1982)	22 May 2019	3 June 2019	12 days	Independent	Kurz I Cabinet
24	Andreas Reichhardt [de]	Andreas Reichhardt (born 1968)	3 June 2019	7 January 2020	218 days	Independent	Bierlein Cabinet
Ministry of Climate Action, Environment, Energy, Mobility, Innovation and Technology (Bundesministerium für Klimaschutz, Umwelt, Energie, Mobilität, Innovation und Technologie)
25	Leonore Gewessler	Leonore Gewessler (born 1977)	7 January 2020	Incumbent	6 years, 243 days	Greens	Kurz II Cabinet

== See also ==
- Ministry of Transport (Austria)
