= First Schüssel government =

First Austrian cabinet under Wolfgang Schüssel

- 25th Government of Austria

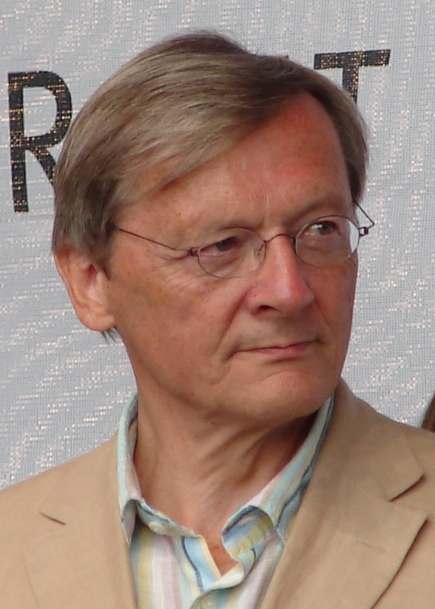
- Wolfgang Schüssel
- Date formed: 4 February 2000
- Date dissolved: 28 February 2003

People and organisations
- President of Austria: Thomas Klestil
- Chancellor: Wolfgang Schüssel
- Vice Chancellor: Susanne Riess-Passer
- No. of ministers: 12
- Member parties: Austrian People's Party (ÖVP); Freedom Party of Austria (FPÖ)
- Status in legislature: Majority coalition
- Opposition parties: Social Democratic Party of Austria (SPÖ); The Greens (GRÜNE)
- Opposition leader: Viktor Klima (2000); Alfred Gusenbauer (2000-2003)

History
- Election: 1999
- Predecessor: Klima
- Successor: Schüssel II

The first Schüssel government of Austria was formed after the 1999 Austrian legislative election under Chancellor Wolfgang Schüssel. It was replaced shortly after the 2002 election. It was the first ÖVP-FPÖ coalition in Austria at federal level.

== Composition ==
Portfolio	Minister	Took office	Left office	Party
Federal Chancellor	Wolfgang Schüssel	4 February 2000	28 February 2003	ÖVP
Vice-Chancellor; Minister for Public Service and Sports	Susanne Riess-Passer	4 February 2000	28 February 2003	FPÖ
Minister for Foreign Affairs	Benita Ferrero-Waldner	4 February 2000	28 February 2003	ÖVP
Minister of the Interior	Ernst Strasser	4 February 2000	28 February 2003	ÖVP
Minister of Justice	Michael Krüger	4 February 2000	2 March 2000	FPÖ
Minister of Justice	Dieter Böhmdorfer	2 March 2000	28 February 2003	FPÖ
Minister of Finance	Karl-Heinz Grasser	4 February 2000	28 February 2003	FPÖ
Minister for Economy and Labour	Martin Bartenstein	4 February 2000	28 February 2003	ÖVP
Minister for Social Security and Generations	Elisabeth Sickl	4 February 2000	24 October 2000	FPÖ
Minister for Social Security and Generations	Herbert Haupt	24 October 2000	28 February 2003	FPÖ
Minister for Agriculture, Forestry, Environment and Water Management	Wilhelm Molterer	4 February 2000	28 February 2003	ÖVP
Minister for Defence	Herbert Scheibner	4 February 2000	28 February 2003	FPÖ
Minister for Transport, Innovation and Technology	Michael Schmid	4 February 2000	13 November 2000	FPÖ
Minister for Transport, Innovation and Technology	Monika Forstinger	13 November 2000	18 February 2002	FPÖ
Minister for Transport, Innovation and Technology	Mathias Reichhold	18 February 2002	28 February 2003	FPÖ
Minister for Education, Science and Culture	Elisabeth Gehrer	4 February 2000	28 February 2003	ÖVP

== See also ==
- First Balkenende cabinet

== Notes and references ==
- "661. Sitzung des Bundesrates der Republik Österreich" [Protocol of the 661st Session of the National Council] (in German). Austrian Government.
