= Schüssel government =

Schüssel government may refer to two government cabinets in Austria:

- the First Schüssel government (2000–2003)
- the Second Schüssel government (2003–2007)
