= Second Schüssel government =

Second Austrian cabinet under Wolfgang Schüssel

- 26th Government of Austria

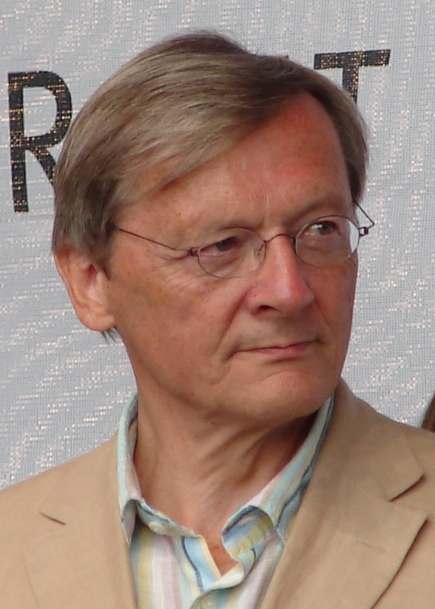
- Wolfgang Schüssel
- Date formed: 28 February 2003
- Date dissolved: 11 January 2007

People and organisations
- President of Austria: Thomas Klestil; Heinz Fischer
- Chancellor: Wolfgang Schüssel
- Vice Chancellor: Hubert Gorbach
- No. of ministers: 12
- Member parties: Austrian People's Party (ÖVP); Freedom Party of Austria (FPÖ) (2003-2005); Alliance for the Future of Austria (BZÖ) (2005-2007)
- Status in legislature: Majority coalition
- Opposition parties: Social Democratic Party of Austria (SPÖ); The Greens (GRÜNE); Freedom Party of Austria (FPÖ) (2005-2007)

History
- Election: 2002
- Predecessor: Schüssel I
- Successor: Gusenbauer

The second Schüssel government (German: Bundesregierung Schüssel II) was sworn in on 28 February 2003 and was replaced on 11 January 2007.

== Composition ==
Portfolio	Minister	Took office	Left office	Party
Federal Chancellor	Wolfgang Schüssel	28 February 2003	11 January 2007	ÖVP
Vice-Chancellor and Minister of Transport, Innovation and Technology	Herbert Haupt	28 February 2003	21 October 2003	FPÖ
Vice-Chancellor and Minister of Transport, Innovation and Technology	Hubert Gorbach	21 October 2003	11 January 2007	BZÖ
Minister of Foreign Affairs	Benita Ferrero-Waldner	28 February 2003	20 October 2004	ÖVP
Minister of Foreign Affairs	Ursula Plassnik	20 October 2004	11 January 2007	ÖVP
Minister for Education, Science and Culture	Elisabeth Gehrer	28 February 2003	11 January 2007	ÖVP
Minister of Finance	Karl-Heinz Grasser	28 February 2003	11 January 2007	Independent
Minister of the Interior	Ernst Strasser	28 February 2003	11 December 2004	ÖVP
Minister of the Interior	Günther Platter (act.)	11 December 2004	22 December 2004	ÖVP
Minister of the Interior	Liese Prokop	22 December 2004	31 December 2006 †	ÖVP
Minister of the Interior	Wolfgang Schüssel (act.)	2 January 2007	11 January 2007	ÖVP
Minister of Transport, Innovation and Technology	Hubert Gorbach	28 February 2003	11 January 2007	BZÖ
Ministry of Social Security, Generations and Consumer Protection (Ministry of Social Security and Generations until 1 May 2003)	Herbert Haupt	28 February 2003	26 January 2005	FPÖ
Ministry of Social Security, Generations and Consumer Protection (Ministry of Social Security and Generations until 1 May 2003)	Ursula Haubner	26 January 2005	11 January 2007	FPÖ
Minister of Justice	Dieter Böhmdorfer	28 February 2003	25 June 2004	Independent
Minister of Justice	Karin Gastinger	25 June 2004	11 January 2007	BZÖ
Minister for Economy and Labour	Martin Bartenstein	28 February 2003	11 January 2007	ÖVP
Minister for Agriculture, Forestry, Environment and Water Management	Josef Pröll	28 February 2003	11 January 2007	ÖVP
Minister for Defence	Günther Platter	28 February 2003	11 January 2007	ÖVP
Minister for Health and Women	Herbert Haupt	28 February 2003	30 April 2003	FPÖ
Minister for Health and Women	Maria Rauch-Kallat	30 April 2003	11 January 2007	ÖVP
