= Forstinger =

Forstinger is a German surname. Notable people with the surname include:

- Hubert Forstinger (born 1946), retired Austrian football referee
- Monika Forstinger (born 1963), Austrian businesswoman and politician
