= Heinz-Christian Strache =

Austrian politician (born 1969)

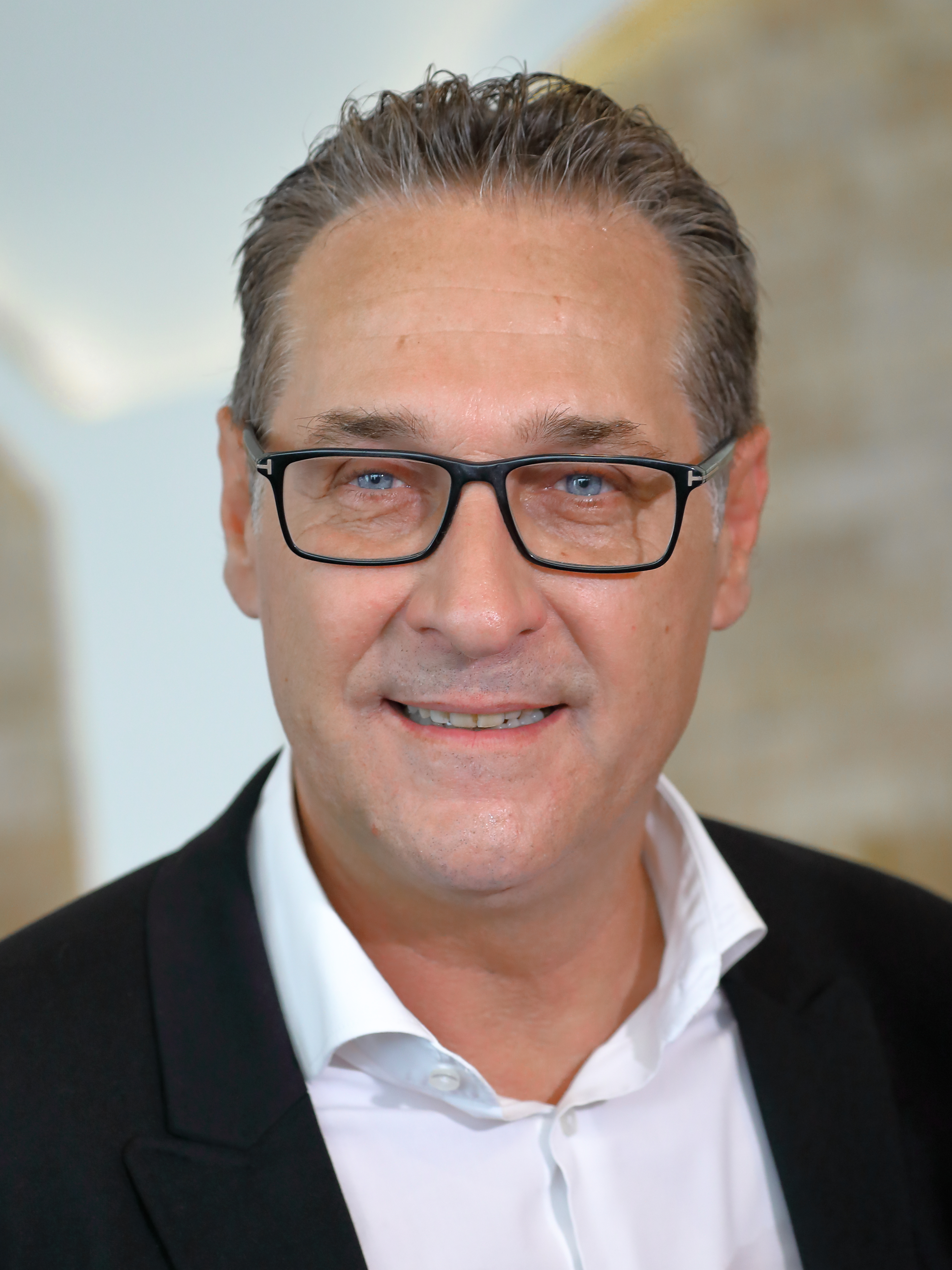
- Strache in 2020

Vice-Chancellor of Austria
- In office 18 December 2017 – 22 May 2019
- Chancellor: Sebastian Kurz
- Preceded by: Wolfgang Brandstetter
- Succeeded by: Hartwig Löger

Minister of the Civil Service and Sport
- In office 8 January 2018 – 22 May 2019
- Chancellor: Sebastian Kurz
- Preceded by: Office established
- Succeeded by: Juliane Bogner-Strauß

Chair of the Freedom Party
- In office 23 April 2005 – 19 May 2019
- Preceded by: Ursula Haubner
- Succeeded by: Norbert Hofer

Personal details
- Born: 12 June 1969 (age 57) Vienna, Austria
- Party: Team HC Strache (since 2020)
- Other political affiliations: Freedom Party (until October 2019)
- Spouses: Daniela Plachutta (m. 1999; div. 2006) Philippa Beck (m. 2016; div. 2023)
- Children: 3
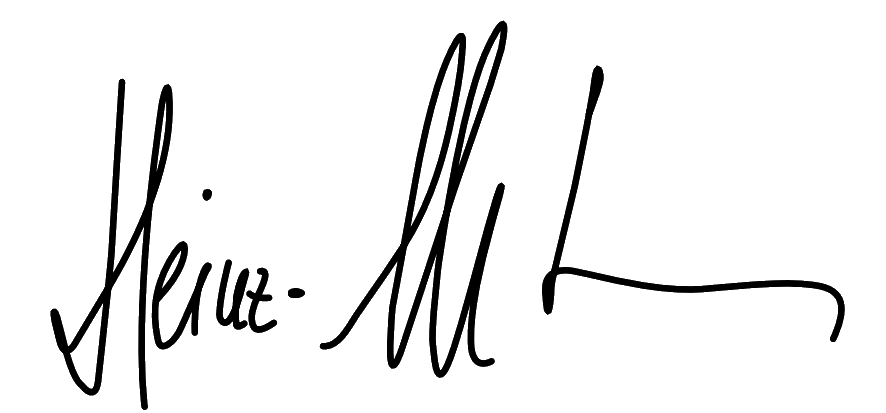
- Signature
- Criminal information
- Criminal information
- Status: acquitted
- Criminal charges: Accepting bribes
- Penalty: 15 months of probation

Heinz-Christian Strache (Austrian German: [haɪnts ˈkrɪsti̯a(ː)n ˈʃtraxɛ]; born 12 June 1969) is an Austrian politician and dental technician who served as Vice-Chancellor of Austria from 2017 to 2019 before resigning owing to his involvement in the Ibiza affair. He was also Minister of Civil Service and Sports from January 2018 to May 2019 and chairman of the Freedom Party (FPÖ) from April 2005 to May 2019. He previously served as a member of the National Council from October 2006 until December 2017 and as a member of the municipal council and state legislature of Vienna (2001–2006).

In May 2019, footage from 2017 was released showing Strache suggesting he could offer business contracts in exchange for political support from a woman posing as the niece of a Russian oligarch. The video also shows his ideas about turning the country's largest-circulation tabloid, the Kronen Zeitung, into a mouthpiece of the FPÖ. On 18 May 2019, in the wake of the Ibiza affair, Strache announced his resignation as vice-chancellor of Austria, minister, and chairman of the Freedom Party.

On 1 October 2019, Strache announced that he was retiring from politics and suspending his membership in the Freedom Party. Despite his vow to retire from politics, Strache joined the then-regional Alliance for Austria (DAÖ) party in February 2020, and became its chairman on 14 May, and stated that the party would run in the 2020 elections for the Gemeinderat and Landtag of Vienna. The Oberpullendorf District branch of the FPÖ switched its affiliation to that of the DAÖ in April, and some other branches were considering similar moves, meaning the party was de facto operating on a national level thereafter.

== Rise to national party leader ==
Strache, who is by profession a dental technician, has been active in the politics of Vienna since 1991. He was elected to the Municipal Council and Landtag of Vienna in 2001. In 2004, he replaced Hilmar Kabas as the leader of the FPÖ in Vienna. He had been considered a disciple of long-time national party leader Jörg Haider, but began to oppose him as the result of increased strife within the party in January 2005.

After a series of losses in state elections, rumours spread that Strache would run for the office of national party leader against Haider's sister, Ursula Haubner. The high risk of Haubner's defeat was probably one of the events that induced Haider to set up a new party, the Alliance for the Future of Austria (BZÖ). After the split, Strache was elected national party leader of the FPÖ on 23 April 2005.

== State elections and campaign in Vienna ==
Since the split, Strache led the FPÖ further to the right. The FPÖ's results in state elections in the last decade have been mixed. While it dropped out of the Styria Landtag and was reduced to 5.7% in Burgenland, it surpassed expectations in the Vienna elections of October 2005. Strache himself was the leading candidate in Vienna, and the party received 14.9% of votes. Strache's campaign, included slogans such as:

- Wien darf nicht Istanbul werden (Vienna must not become Istanbul). A variation on an FPÖ slogan from the Haider era: Wien darf nicht Chicago werden. Vienna has a significant Turkish minority, the FPÖ is opposed to Turkish EU membership and it refers to the defeat of the Ottoman Empire in the Battle of Vienna in 1683, a symbolic historic victory of the West over Islamic and Ottoman onslaught.
- Daham statt Islam ("at home" [i.e., folks who are native to Austria] instead of Islam)
- Deutsch statt "nix verstehen" (German instead of "I don't understand")
- Pummerin statt Muezzin (Pummerin instead of muezzin). Pummerin is the main bell in St. Stephan's Cathedral in Vienna, and so a religious Christian symbol in Vienna.
- Heimat im Herzen (Homeland in the heart)
- Arbeit statt Zuwanderung (Jobs instead of immigration)

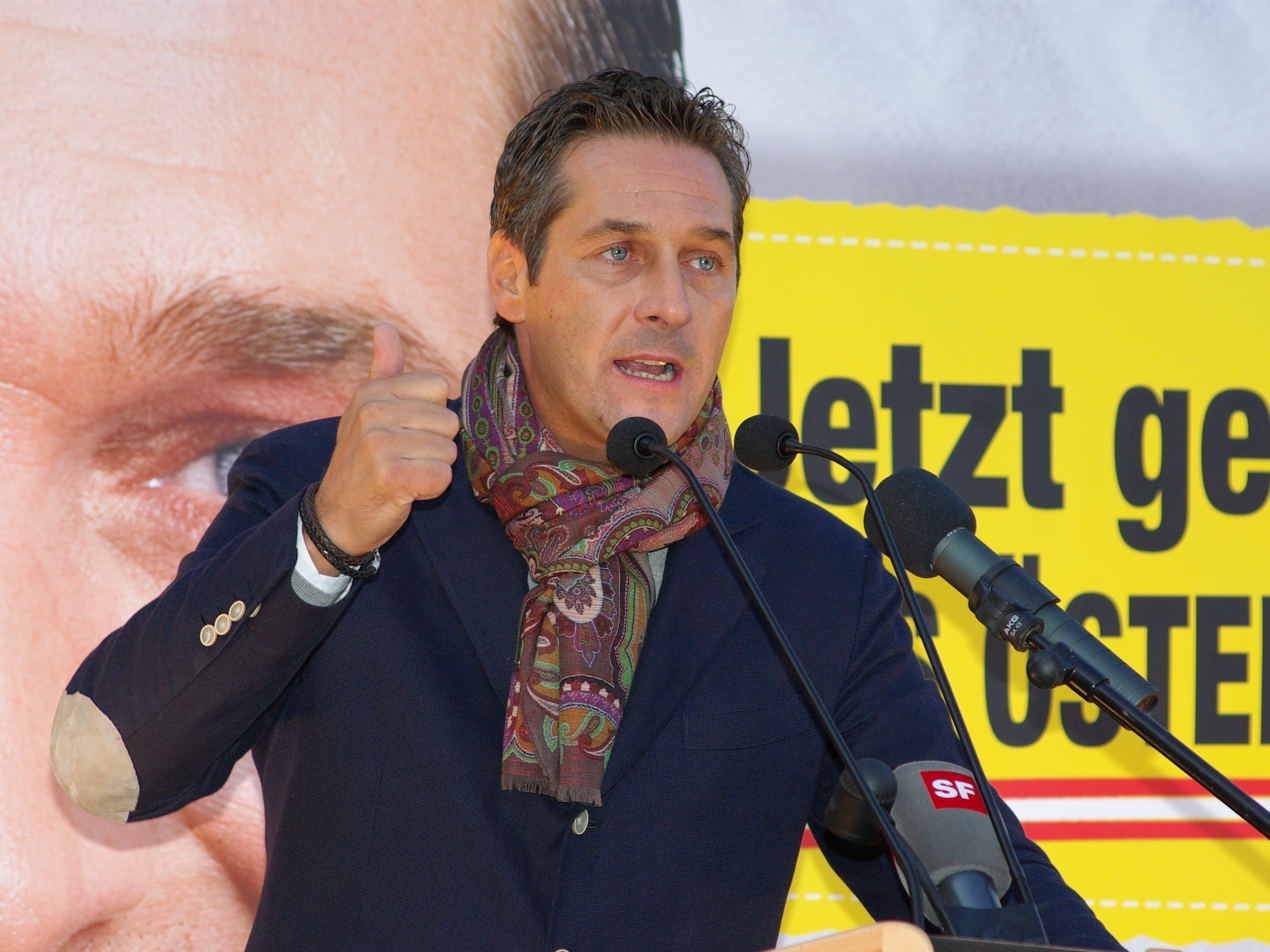
Heinz-Christian Strache in 2008

In January 2007, stills taken from a video shot in the late 1980s were published showing a uniformed Strache allegedly participating in paramilitary training activities. Other people on the pictures were claimed to be known neo-Nazis. Strache has denied the allegations, stating the pictures are of him playing paintball as an 18-year-old. In his initial reaction, Chancellor Alfred Gusenbauer referred to the incident as a "folly of youth" (Jugendtorheit). At the end of January, further pictures were published, allegedly showing Strache performing a Nazi salute (the Kühnen salute). Strache denied the allegations prior to publication of the pictures. After publication, Strache argued that the picture showed him ordering three beers and was not a Nazi salute. Austrian Jewish community leaders criticized the government for its lack of response.

== 2010 Vienna elections ==
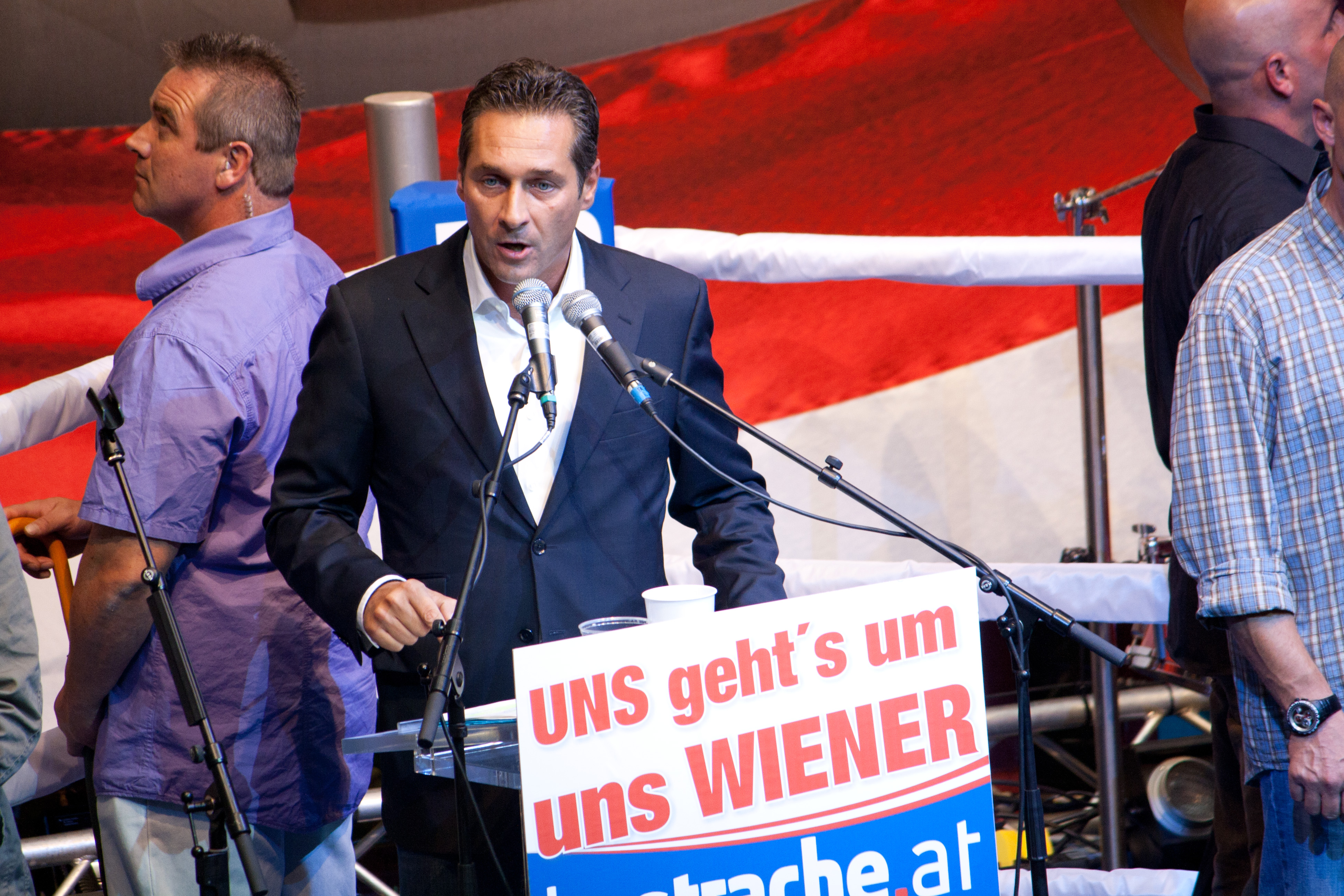
Heinz-Christian Strache, speaking at a rally before the 2010 Vienna elections

In the 2010 Vienna elections for Mayor of Vienna, Vienna City Council, and district councils, Strache's party received 26% of the vote and increased their number of seats in the city council to 27. His support was strongest among young people under 30.

The campaign included slogans such as:

- Zu viel Fremdes tut niemandem gut. (Too much of what's foreign does nobody well.)
- Wir bewahren unsere Heimatstadt. Die SPÖ macht sie uns fremd. (We maintain our homeland-city. The SPÖ makes it foreign.)
- Wir glauben an unsere Jugend. Die SPÖ an Zuwanderung. (We believe in our youth. The SPÖ in immigration.)
- Wir schützen freie Frauen. Die SPÖ den Kopftuchzwang (We protect free women. The SPÖ protects the compulsory veil.)
- Mehr Mut für unser Wiener Blut (More courage for our Viennese blood.)
- Uns geht's um die Wiener (To us, it's about the Viennese)

Strache was once again accused of xenophobia during his campaign and responded formally in the press to the allegations. In August 2012, Strache caused condemnation and outrage when posting a picture on Facebook that was a caricature depicting a banker with a hooked nose and Star of David cufflinks.

== 2019 European parliament elections ==
Strache campaigned for the FPÖ in the lead up to 2019 European Parliament election in Austria. In what The Guardian described as "doubling down" on rhetoric ahead of the election, Strache endorsed the far-right conspiracy of the great replacement. He claimed that "population replacement" was real, adding: "We don't want to become a minority in our own country".

== Ibiza affair ==
On 17 May 2019 a video was released from a July 2017 meeting in Ibiza, Spain, appearing to show Strache and Johann Gudenus discussing underhanded political practices. In the video, both politicians appeared receptive to proposals by a mysterious woman posing as the niece of a Russian oligarch Igor Makarov, discussing providing the FPÖ positive news coverage in return for business contracts. Strache and Gudenus also hinted at corrupt political practices involving other wealthy donors to the FPÖ in Europe and elsewhere. The scandal caused the collapse of the Austrian governing coalition and the announcement of a snap election. Strache is currently under investigation for misuse of party funds. He is also under trial for corruption.

Strache was expelled from the FPÖ in December 2019 for his role in the scandal. In August 2020, the public prosecutor's office received an additional 5 minutes of video footage which appeared to relieve Strache from some of the accusations. In the uncut video, Strache had refused the decoy's offer and doing anything illegal. Strache accused Der Spiegel and the Süddeutsche Zeitung of showing selectively edited material.

In the ORF documentary The talented Mr. Strache - How to destroy a career, which was broadcast in April 2022, opponents, companions and Strache himself reviewed his political career from rise to fall, and also dealt specifically with the Ibiza affair.

== Later career ==
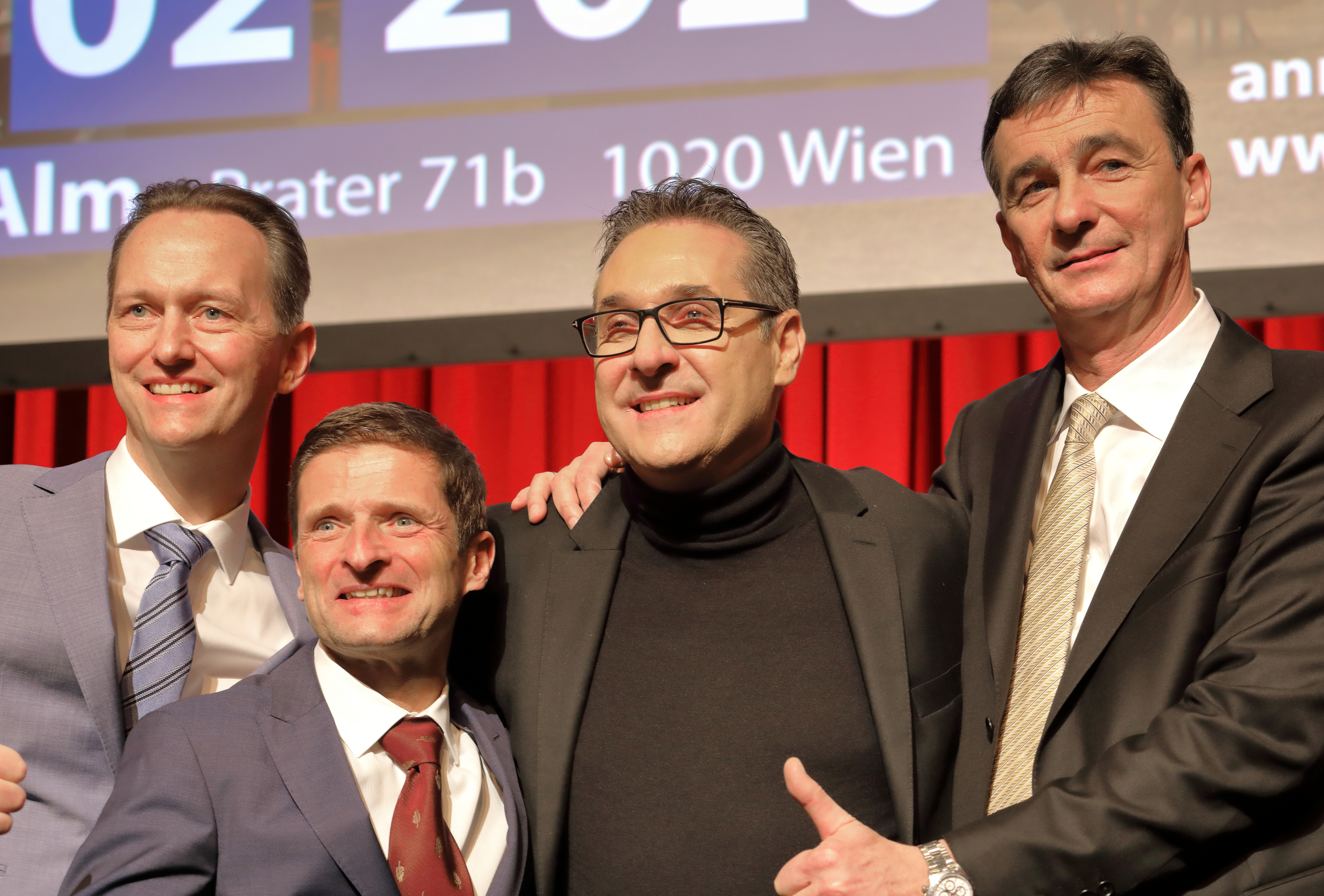
Heinz-Christian Strache with the DAÖ founders at their "New Year's Meeting" in January 2020

In February 2020, Strache became leader of Team HC Strache – Alliance for Austria. He participated in the 2020 Viennese state election, but his party did not win any seats.

== Relationship with Trump administration ==
Strache flew to New York shortly after the election of Donald Trump in December 2016 to meet with Michael Flynn at the Trump Tower. Flynn had just helped lead the effort to elect Trump and served as his National Security Advisor for 24 days in January through February 2017. Also in November, Austrian far-right politicians Norbert Hofer and Strache went to Russia in order to become go-betweens to facilitate cooperation between Putin and Trump. While in Moscow, the Freedom Party concluded a "working agreement" with Putin's United Russia Party. Flynn later resigned after information surfaced that he had misled the FBI and Vice President Mike Pence about the nature and content of his communications with Russian Ambassador to the U.S. Sergey Kislyak.

== Conviction and acquittal ==
Strache was indicted on grounds of bribery by the Public Prosecutorial Service for Economic Cases and Corruption (WKStA) in the Criminal Court of Vienna. The criminal charge accused the FPÖ – under Strache's leadership – of having accepted illicit campaign donations totaling €12,000 from Walter Grubmüller, the owner of a private nursing home in Vienna. Grubmüller had allegedly bribed Strache to sponsor a legislative bill amending the law which governs the Privatkrankenanstalten-Finanzierungsfonds, a government fund that supports private medical institutions. The amendment would have caused the fund to also cover Grubmüller's nursing home and allowed him to charge the ÖGK – a public health insurance organization in Austria – for patients who choose the public option.

On 27 August 2021, Strache and Grubmüller were convicted and sentenced to 15 months of probation; Strache appealed the ruling to the Vienna Court of Appeals (Oberlandesgericht). The Vienna Court of Appeals reversed the judgment - since in its view, exculpatory material had not been considered properly - and remanded the case. On 10 January 2023 the Criminal Court of Vienna acquitted Strache, citing lack of proof.

Party political offices
Preceded by Ursula Haubner	Chair of the Freedom Party; 2005–2019	Succeeded by Norbert Hofer
Political offices
Preceded by Wolfgang Brandstetter	Vice-Chancellor of Austria; 2017–2019	Succeeded by Hartwig Löger
