= First Kurz government =

Government of Austria from 2017 to 2019

- 30th Cabinet of Austria

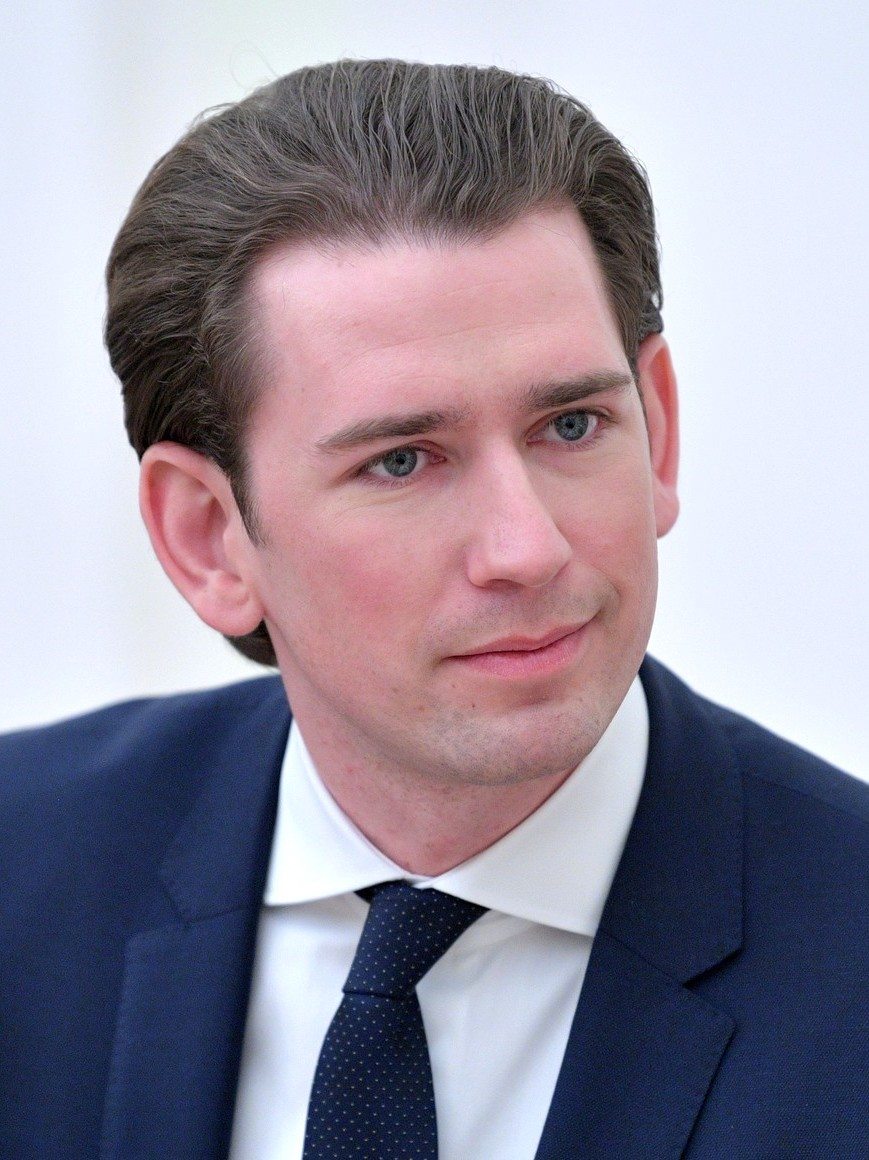
- Date formed: 18 December 2017
- Date dissolved: 3 June 2019

People and organisations
- Appointed by: Alexander Van der Bellen
- Chancellor: Sebastian Kurz (2017–2019); Hartwig Löger (Acting; 2019)
- Vice-Chancellor: Heinz-Christian Strache (2017–2019); Hartwig Löger (2019)
- No. of ministers: 13
- Member parties: Black–blue coalition: Austrian People's Party (ÖVP); Freedom Party of Austria (FPÖ) (2017–2019)
- Status in legislature: Majority coalition (2017–2019); Semi-technocratic minority cabinet (2019)
- Opposition parties: Social Democratic Party of Austria (SPÖ); Freedom Party of Austria (FPÖ) (2019); NEOS; JETZT
- Opposition leader: Christian Kern (2017–2018); Pamela Rendi-Wagner (2018–2019)

History
- Election: 2017 legislative election
- Predecessor: Kern government
- Successor: Bierlein government

The First Kurz government (German: Erste Bundesregierung Kurz or Kurz I for short) was the 30th Government of Austria in office from 18 December 2017 until 3 June 2019. It succeeded the Kern government formed after the 2017 legislative election. Sebastian Kurz, chairman of the centre-right Austrian People's Party, known by its initials in German as ÖVP, reached an agreement on a coalition with the far-right Freedom Party of Austria (FPÖ), setting the stage for Kurz to become chancellor of Austria—the youngest head of government in Europe—for the first time.

In the wake of the May 2019 Ibiza affair, Kurz terminated the coalition agreement and called for a snap election, which was ultimately held on 29 September 2019, after some disagreements over the timing. Kurz announced that his government would run as a minority technocratic caretaker government in the interim. However, on 27 May 2019, his government was dismissed by the National Council through a motion of no confidence, the first successful parliamentary vote of no confidence in the Second Republic. On 3 June 2019, President Alexander Van der Bellen swore in a technocratic caretaker government led by Brigitte Bierlein, which held office until the new coalition government between the ÖVP and The Greens was sworn in.

== Composition ==
Portrait	Name	Office	Took office	Left office	Party	Federal Home State
=== Leadership ===
	Sebastian Kurz	Chancellor of Austria (2017-2019)	18 December 2017	28 May 2019	ÖVP	Vienna
	Hartwig Löger	Acting Chancellor of Austria (2019); Vice Chancellor of Austria (2019); Minister of Finance (2017-2019)	18 December 2017	3 June 2019	ÖVP	Styria
	Heinz-Christian Strache	Vice Chancellor of Austria; Minister of Civil Service and Sports	18 December 2017	22 May 2019	FPÖ	Vienna
=== Ministers ===
	Eckart Ratz	Minister of the Interior	22 May 2019	3 June 2019	Independent	Vorarlberg
	Herbert Kickl	Minister of the Interior	18 December 2017	22 May 2019	FPÖ	Carinthia
	Karin Kneissl	Minister for Europe, Integration and Foreign Affairs	18 December 2017	3 June 2019	Independent (FPÖ nominated)	Vienna
	Josef Moser	Minister of Constitutional Affairs, Reforms, Deregulation and Justice	18 December 2017	3 June 2019	Independent (ÖVP nominated)	Tyrol
	Johann Luif	Minister of Defence	22 May 2019	3 June 2019	Independent	Burgenland
	Mario Kunasek	Minister of Defence	18 December 2017	22 May 2019	FPÖ	Styria
	Heinz Faßmann	Minister of Education, Science and Research	18 December 2017	3 June 2019	Independent (ÖVP nominated)	(Born abroad)
	Walter Pöltner	Minister of Labor, Social Affairs, Health and Consumer Protection	22 May 2019	3 June 2019	Independent	Vienna
	Beate Hartinger-Klein	Minister of Labor, Social Affairs, Health and Consumer Protection	18 December 2017	22 May 2019	FPÖ	Styria
	Valerie Hackl	Minister of Transport, Innovation and Technology	22 May 2019	3 June 2019	Independent	Vienna
	Norbert Hofer	Minister of Transport, Innovation and Technology	18 December 2017	22 May 2019	FPÖ	Styria
	Elisabeth Köstinger	Minister of Sustainability and Tourism	18 December 2017	3 June 2019	ÖVP	Carinthia
	Margarete Schramböck	Minister of Digital and Economic Affairs	8 January 2018	3 June 2019	ÖVP	Tyrol
	Juliane Bogner-Strauß	acting Minister of Civil Service and Sports	22 May 2019	3 June 2019	ÖVP	Styria
=== Chancellery ministers ===
	Gernot Blümel	Chancellery minister for the EU, Arts, Culture and Media	18 December 2017	3 June 2019	ÖVP	Vienna
	Juliane Bogner-Strauß	Chancellery minister for Women, Families and Youth	18 December 2017	3 June 2019	ÖVP	Styria
=== State secretaries ===
	Hubert Fuchs	State secretary in the Ministry of Finance	18 December 2017	22 May 2019	FPÖ	Salzburg
	Karoline Edtstadler	State secretary in the Ministry of the Interior	18 December 2017	3 June 2019	ÖVP	Salzburg

== See also ==
- Politics of Austria
