= Schwanenstadt =

- Municipality
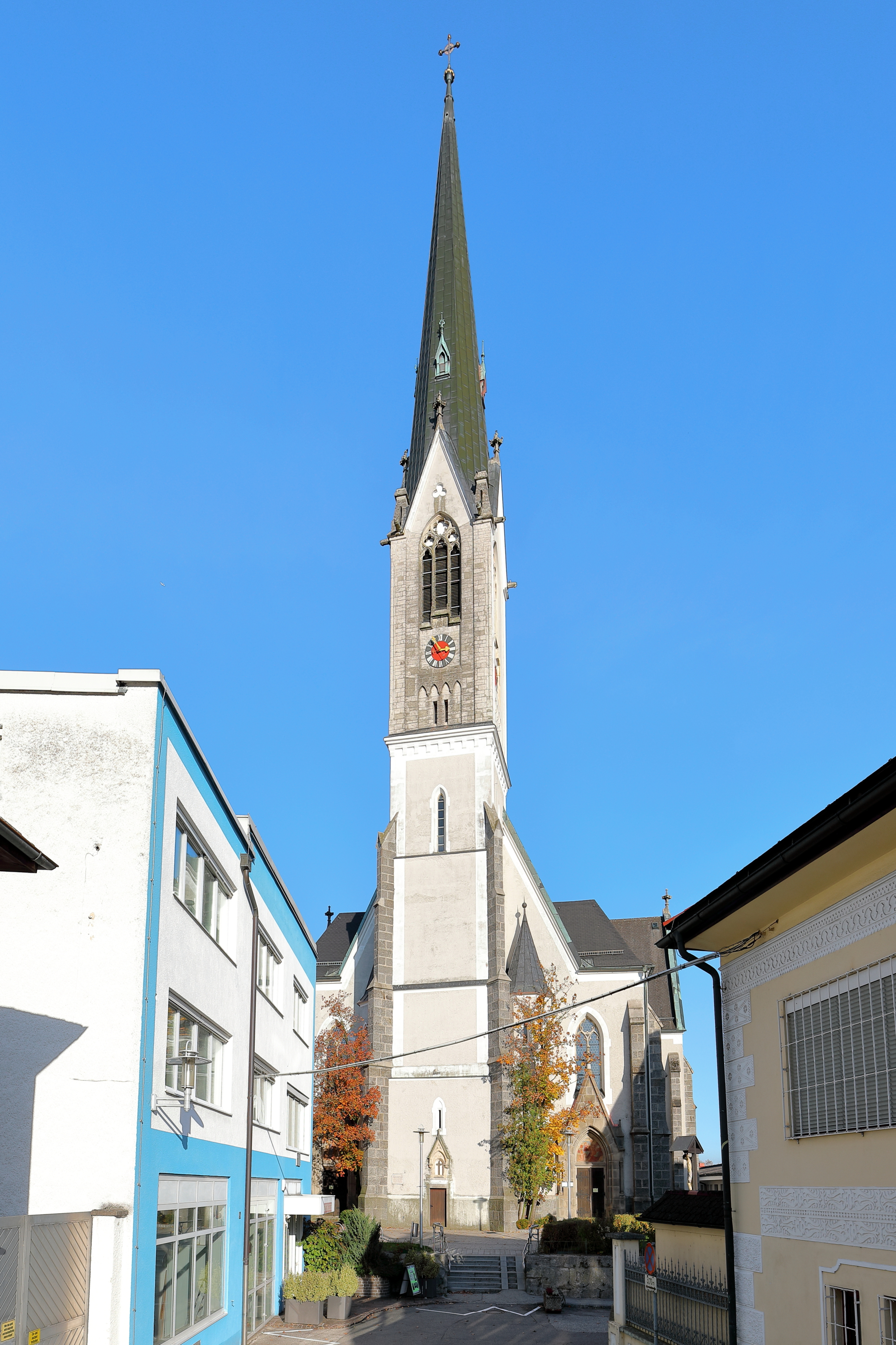

- Coat of arms

- Location within Austria
- Coordinates: 48°03′19″N 13°46′33″E
- Country: Austria
- State: Upper Austria
- District: Vöcklabruck

Government
  - Mayor: Doris Staudinger (ÖVP)

Area
  - Total: 2.63 km^{2} (1.02 sq mi)
- Elevation: 389 m (1,276 ft)

Population (2018-01-01)
  - Total: 4,264
  - Density: 1,620/km^{2} (4,200/sq mi)
- Time zone: UTC+1 (CET)
  - Summer (DST): UTC+2 (CEST)
- Postal code: 4690
- Area code: 07673
- Vehicle registration: VB
- Website: www.schwanenstadt.at

Schwanenstadt is a town in the district of Vöcklabruck in the Austrian state of Upper Austria.

== Population ==
Historical population
Year	Pop.	±%
1869	1,526	—
1880	1,619	+6.1%
1890	1,574	−2.8%
1900	1,809	+14.9%
1910	1,829	+1.1%
1923	1,871	+2.3%
1934	2,194	+17.3%
1939	2,458	+12.0%
1951	3,289	+33.8%
1961	3,853	+17.1%
1971	4,093	+6.2%
1981	3,840	−6.2%
1991	3,787	−1.4%
2001	4,131	+9.1%
2011	4,150	+0.5%
2015	4,162	+0.3%

== Notable people ==
- Franz Xaver Süssmayr (1766–1803), an Austrian composer and conductor.
- Peter Ablinger (1959–2025), an Austrian composer.
- Monika Forstinger (born 1963), an Austrian businesswoman and former politician (FPÖ).
