= Ministry of the Arts, Culture, the Civil Service and Sport (Austria) =

Government ministry of Austria

Federal Ministry for Arts, Culture, the Civil Service and Sport
- Bundesministerium für Kunst, Kultur, öffentlichen Dienst und Sport
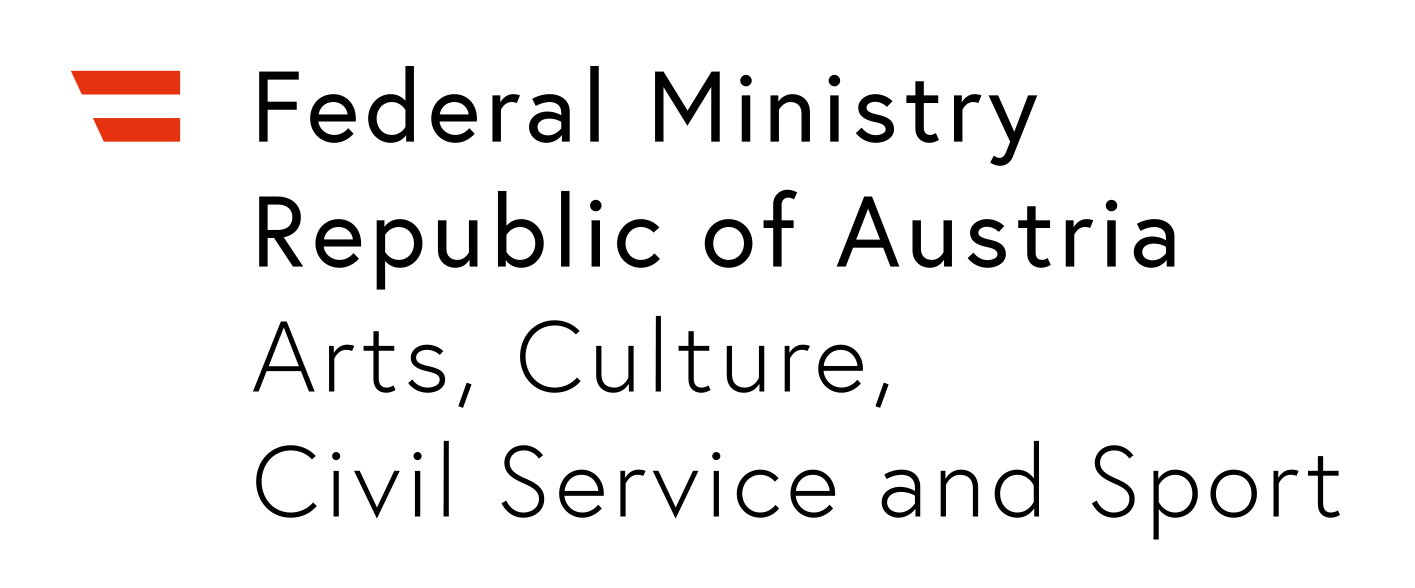

Ministry overview
- Formed: 2020; 5 years ago
- Jurisdiction: Austria
- Headquarters: 1030, Radetzkystraße 2 Vienna
- Minister responsible: Andreas Babler
- Website: bmkoes.gv.at

The Ministry of the Arts, Culture, the Civil Service and Sport (German: Bundesministerium für Kunst, Kultur, öffentlichen Dienst und Sport or BMKÖDS) is the government ministry of Austria in charge of the arts and sport as well as public administration and personnel questions that do not fall within the jurisdiction of another ministry. It bears responsibility for the management of museums and theatres, the maintenance of landmarks and historical sites, and the promotion of Austrian cinema.

== History ==
Even though the Republic of Austria has always had a large public sector and a considerable number of career civil servants, the country does not usually maintain a dedicated civil service ministry. Traditionally, the interest of Austria's civil servants (Beamte) were protected by their strong union (the Beamtengewerkschaft) and by the fact that civil servants were overrepresented among the upper ranks of every major political party. Public employment policy was set, and public employment law written, by the Chancellery and the Ministry of Finance.

A precursor of the current Ministry called the Ministry of Public Services and Sports (Bundesministerium für öffentliche Leistungen und Sport) was established by the Schüssel I cabinet in 2000, then unceremoniously disestablished by the Schüssel II cabinet in 2003. Its responsibilities were attached to the Chancellery. The Ministry was resurrected by the First Kurz cabinet in 2018 as Federal Ministry of the Civil Service and Sport. On 29 January 2020, it was renamed Federal Ministry for Arts, Culture, the Civil Service and Sport by the Second Kurz government.

== Responsibilities ==
- Arts and Culture
- Sport
- The Austrian Federal Civil Service
- establishment of the Austrian Public Sector Awards every 2 years

== Structure ==
Since January 2020, the ministry consists of the Minister and his or her personal staff (Kabinett), the office of the general secretary, and four departments:

- Presidium (Sektion I − Präsidialangelegenheiten)
- Sports (Sektion II − Sport)
- Civil service and administration innovation (Sektion III − Öffentlicher Dienst und Verwaltungsinnovation)
- Arts and Culture (Sektion IV – Kunst und Kultur)

The Minister and his or her staff are political appointees; the general secretary and the section heads are career civil servants.

== Ministers ==
No.	Portrait	Name (Born-Died)	Term			Political Party	Government
No.	Portrait	Name (Born-Died)	Took office	Left office	Duration	Political Party	Government
Ministry of the Civil Service and Sport (Bundesministerium für öffentlichen Dienst und Sport)
1	Heinz-Christian Strache	Heinz-Christian Strache (born 1969)	8 January 2018	22 May 2019	1 year, 155 days	FPÖ	Kurz I Cabinet
2	Juliane Bogner-Strauß	Juliane Bogner-Strauß (born 1971)	22 May 2019	3 June 2019	12 days	ÖVP	Kurz I Cabinet
3	Eduard Müller	Eduard Müller (born 1962)	3 June 2019	7 January 2020	218 days	Independent	Bierlein Cabinet
Ministry for Arts, Culture, the Civil Service and Sport (Bundesministerium für Kunst, Kultur, öffentlichen Dienst und Sport)
4	Werner Kogler	Werner Kogler (born 1961)	7 January 2020	3 March 2025	5 years, 55 days	Greens	Kurz II Cabinet; Schallenberg Cabinet; Nehammer Cabinet
5	Andreas Babler	Andreas Babler (born 1973)	3 March 2025	Incumbent	120 days	SPÖ	Stocker Cabinet
