= Ferdinand Lacina =

Austrian politician (born 1942)

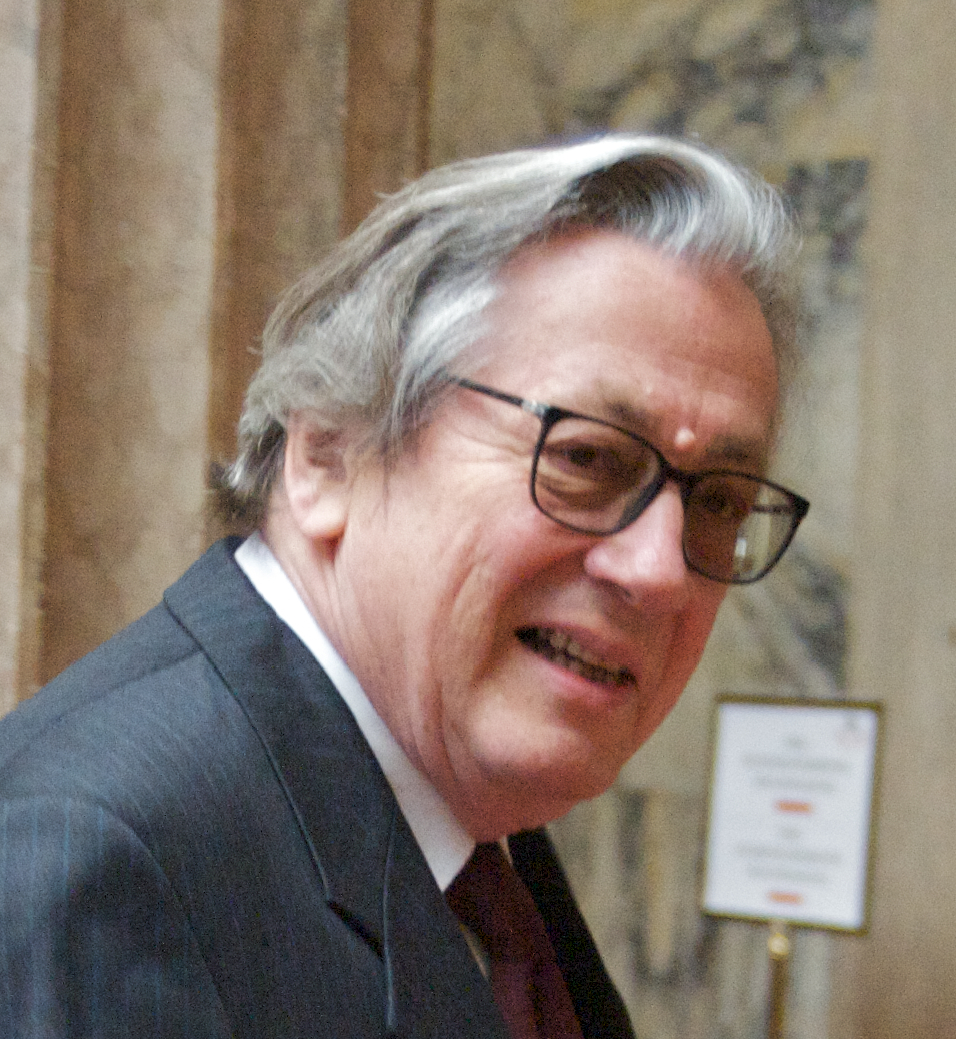

Minister of Finance
- In office 16 June 1986 – 6 April 1995
- Prime Minister: Franz Vranitzky
- Preceded by: Franz Vranitzky
- Succeeded by: Andreas Staribacher

Personal details
- Born: 31 December 1942 (age 83)
- Party: Social Democratic Party of Austria
- Education: Vienna University of Economics and Business

Ferdinand Lacina (born 31 December 1942) is an Austrian politician. He served as finance minister from 1986 to 1995.

== Early life ==
Lacina was born on 31 December 1942. He is a graduate of the Vienna University of Economics and Business and was among the leading figures of the antifascist student movement in the 1960s.

== Career ==
Lacina is a member of the Social Democratic Party of Austria. He served as minister of transport and nationalized industries. On 16 June 1986 he was appointed finance minister, replacing Franz Vranitzky in the post. The cabinet was led by Franz Vranitzky. Lacina successfully reduced the federal deficit to 3.2% in 1994 following a long period of consolidation. His tenure lasted until 6 April 1995 when he resigned from office. Andreas Staribacher succeeded him in the post.

Following the retirement from politics Lacina was named the general director of the GiroCredit Bank. He was also a member of Bank Medici's supervisory board. Lacina is the president of the Austrian Marshall Plan Foundation.
