= Monika Forstinger =

Austrian businesswoman and former politician

Monika Forstinger (born 15 July 1963) is an Austrian businesswoman and former politician associated with the Freedom Party of Austria (FPÖ).

== Life ==
Forstinger was born in Schwanenstadt, Upper Austria, in 1963. She studied at the University of Natural Resources and Life Sciences, Vienna (BOKU) and the Johannes Kepler University Linz, graduating in 1988 and finishing a doctorate in 1997. She has one son, born c. 2005.

She became Minister for Transport, Innovation and Technology in the first Schüssel government on 11 November 2000. Forstinger was repeatedly criticised in this position, for example for issuing a flawed telephone number regulation which was rescinded almost immediately. She resigned in February 2002 after 15 months in office.

After leaving politics, Forstinger went to study in France and founded a consultancy firm specialising in risk management. This caused controversy in 2003 when her company received a contract from the state-owned Austrian Federal Railways (ÖBB). In February 2018 she was appointed to the ÖBB supervisory board. In the same year, she became a member of the university council at the BOKU.
