= 1999 Austrian legislative election =

Elections in Austria

| ← 1995 | 3 October 1999 | 2002 → |

All 183 seats in the National Council 92 seats needed for a majority
- Turnout: 80.42% (▼5.56 pp)
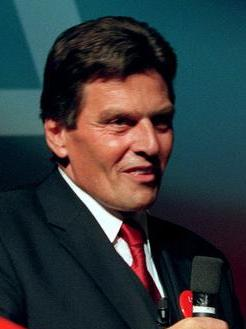

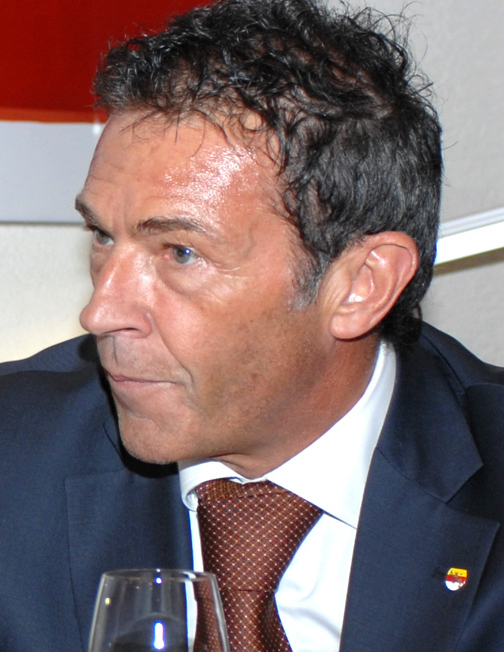

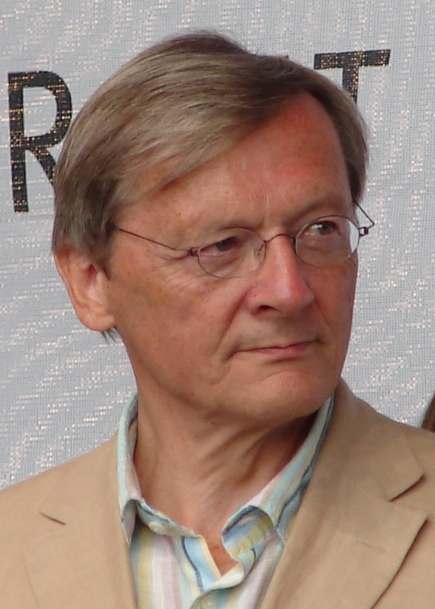

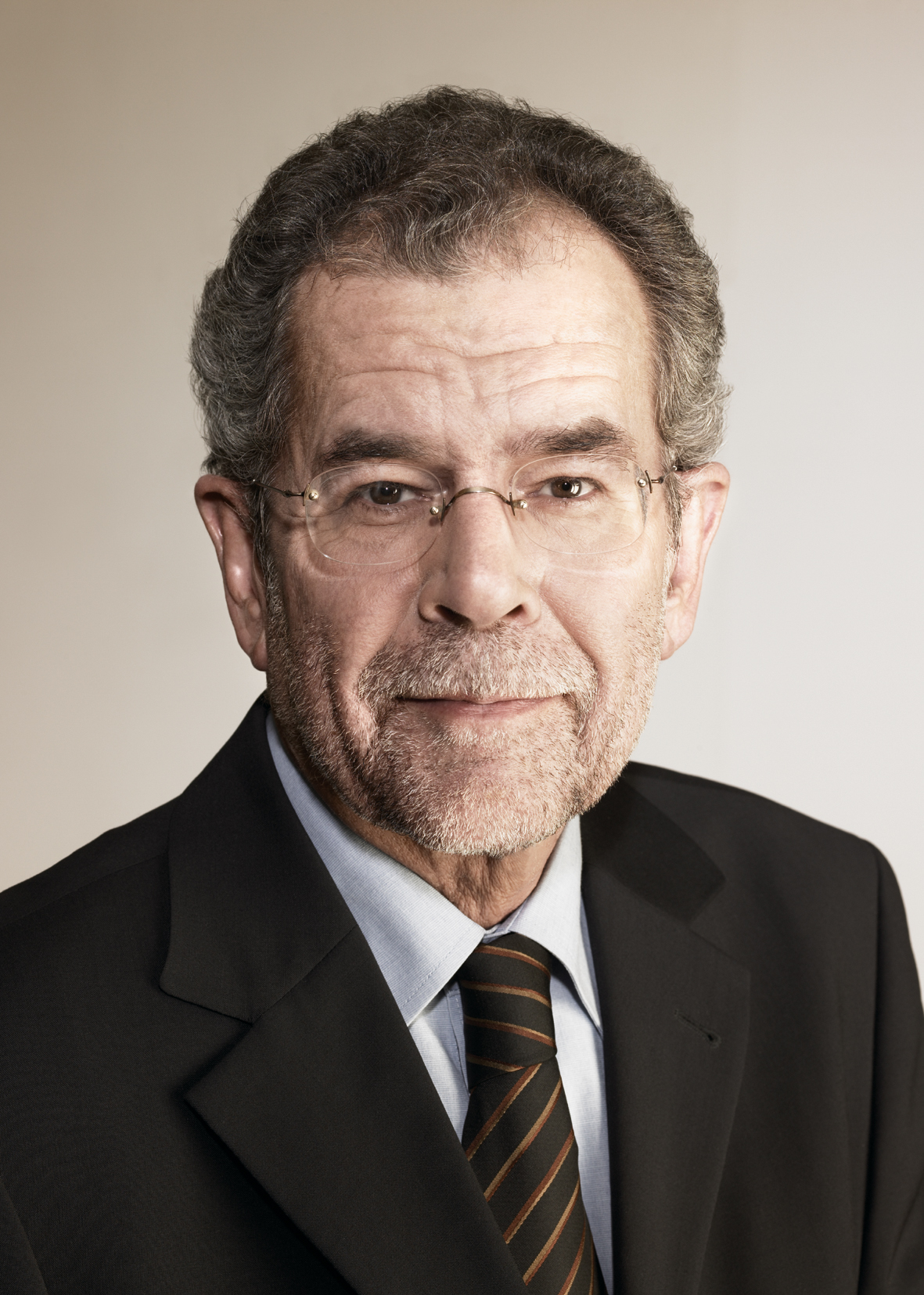
| | First party | Second party |
|---|---|---|
| Leader | Viktor Klima | Jörg Haider |
| Party | SPÖ | FPÖ |
| Last election | 38.06%, 71 seats | 21.89%, 41 seats |
| Seats won | 65 | 52 |
| Seat change | ▼6 | ▲11 |
| Popular vote | 1,532,448 | 1,244,087 |
| Percentage | 33.15% | 26.91% |
| Swing | ▼4.91 pp | ▲5.02 pp |
| | Third party | Fourth party |
| Leader | Wolfgang Schüssel | Alexander Van der Bellen |
| Party | ÖVP | Greens |
| Last election | 28.29%, 52 seats | 4.81%, 9 seats |
| Seats won | 52 | 14 |
| Seat change | 0 | ▲5 |
| Popular vote | 1,243,672 | 342,260 |
| Percentage | 26.91% | 7.40% |
| Swing | ▼1.38 pp | ▲2.59 pp |
Chancellor before election
Viktor Klima
SPÖ
Elected Chancellor
Wolfgang Schüssel
ÖVP

Parliamentary elections were held in Austria on 3 October 1999. Although the Social Democratic Party remained the largest party in the National Council, a right-wing coalition government was formed by the Freedom Party of Austria (FPÖ) and the Austrian People's Party (ÖVP) after several months of negotiations. Although the FPÖ had finished a fraction of a point ahead of the ÖVP in the popular vote, ÖVP leader Wolfgang Schüssel became Chancellor rather than controversial FPÖ leader Jörg Haider. Haider, who had also been elected Landeshauptmann of Carinthia, was not appointed to the cabinet and resigned as party leader.

However, foreign governments remained critical of the FPÖ's inclusion in the government and the fourteen other member countries of the European Union imposed sanctions on the country, whilst domestically the government faced protests organised by the SPÖ and Greens. However, this pressure on the government helped stabilise it and when it became clear that the FPÖ was not going to be excluded from government, sanctions were lifted.

Voter turnout was 80.4%.

== Contesting parties ==
The table below lists parties represented in the 20th National Council.

| Name | | Ideology | Leader | 1995 result | |
| Name | | Ideology | Leader | Votes (%) | Seats |
|---|---|---|---|---|---|
| SPÖ | Social Democratic Party of Austria; Sozialdemokratische Partei Österreichs | Social democracy | Viktor Klima | 38.1% | 71 / 183 |
| ÖVP | Austrian People's Party; Österreichische Volkspartei | Christian democracy | Wolfgang Schüssel | 28.3% | 52 / 183 |
| FPÖ | Freedom Party of Austria; Freiheitliche Partei Österreichs | Right-wing populism Euroscepticism | Jörg Haider | 21.9% | 41 / 183 |
| LiF | Liberal Forum; Liberales Forum | Liberalism | Heide Schmidt | 5.5% | 10 / 183 |
| GRÜNE | The Greens; Die Grünen | Green politics | Alexander Van der Bellen | 4.8% | 9 / 183 |

== Results ==
| Party | Votes | % | Seats | +/– |
|---|---|---|---|---|
| Social Democratic Party of Austria | 1,532,448 | 33.15 | 65 | –6 |
| Freedom Party of Austria | 1,244,087 | 26.91 | 52 | +11 |
| Austrian People's Party | 1,243,672 | 26.91 | 52 | 0 |
| The Greens | 342,260 | 7.40 | 14 | +5 |
| Liberal Forum | 168,612 | 3.65 | 0 | –10 |
| The Independents | 46,943 | 1.02 | 0 | New |
| Communist Party of Austria | 22,016 | 0.48 | 0 | 0 |
| No to NATO and EU – Neutral Austria Citizens' Initiative | 19,286 | 0.42 | 0 | 0 |
| Christian Voters Community | 3,030 | 0.07 | 0 | New |
| Total | 4,622,354 | 100.00 | 183 | 0 |
| Valid votes | 4,622,354 | 98.45 | | |
| Invalid/blank votes | 72,871 | 1.55 | | |
| Total votes | 4,695,225 | 100.00 | | |
| Registered voters/turnout | 5,838,373 | 80.42 | | |
Source: Austrian Interior Ministry

=== Results by state ===
| State | SPÖ | FPÖ | ÖVP | Grüne | LiF | Others |
|---|---|---|---|---|---|---|
| Burgenland | 41.9 | 21.0 | 30.6 | 3.7 | 1.8 | 1.0 |
| Carinthia | 35.7 | 38.6 | 16.3 | 5.5 | 2.6 | 1.3 |
| Lower Austria | 33.8 | 22.5 | 32.9 | 6.0 | 2.9 | 1.9 |
| Upper Austria | 33.1 | 26.8 | 28.6 | 7.4 | 2.7 | 1.4 |
| Salzburg | 28.9 | 29.4 | 27.8 | 8.4 | 3.8 | 1.7 |
| Styria | 33.8 | 29.2 | 26.8 | 5.8 | 2.6 | 1.8 |
| Tyrol | 23.1 | 28.0 | 32.9 | 9.7 | 3.7 | 2.6 |
| Vorarlberg | 18.2 | 30.2 | 35.2 | 10.0 | 4.8 | 1.6 |
| Vienna | 37.9 | 24.8 | 17.0 | 10.3 | 7.0 | 3.0 |
| Austria | 33.2 | 26.9 | 26.9 | 7.4 | 3.6 | 2.0 |
Source: Austrian Interior Ministry
