= Ursula Haubner =

Austrian politician (born 1945)

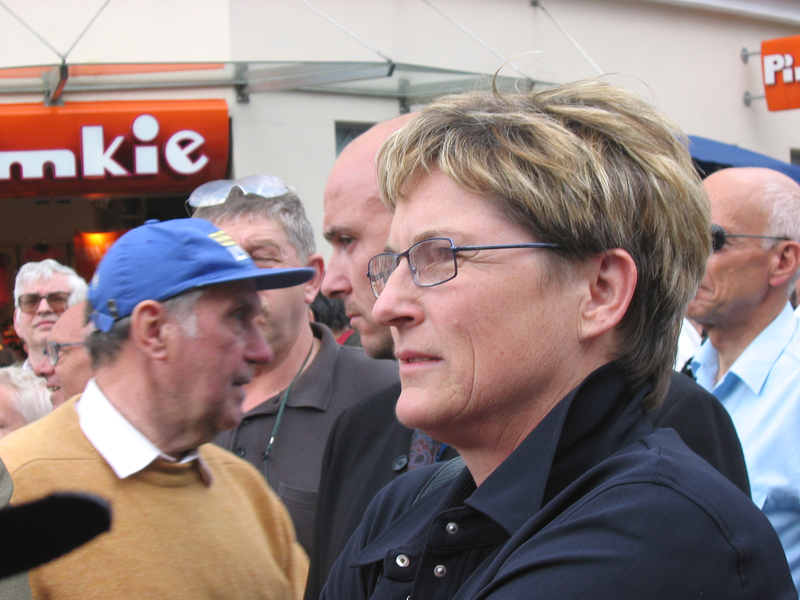
Haubner in 2004

Ursula Haubner (born 22 December 1945) is an Austrian politician of the Alliance for the Future of Austria (BZÖ), formerly of the Austrian Freedom Party (FPÖ).

== Early life and education ==
Haubner was born in Bad Goisern, Upper Austria, and took her Matura exams in Bad Ischl in 1963. Her younger brother was former FPÖ and BZÖ party chairman Jörg Haider.

== Career ==
A former teacher, local politician, and a member of government (Staatssekretärin) since February 2003, Haubner was appointed federal minister of social affairs in January 2005, succeeding Herbert Haupt, whom she had already followed as party chairperson in June 2004.

She joined her brother Jörg Haider when he decided to split from the Freedom Party to create the Alliance for the Future of Austria (BZÖ). She served as a Member of the Austrian Parliament for the party until 2013.

== Personal life ==
Haubner is married and has two daughters and five grandchildren.

Preceded by Herbert Haupt	FPÖ Party Chairman; 2004 – 2005	Succeeded by Hilmar Kabas (interim)
