= Viktor Klima =

Chancellor of Austria (1997-2000; born 1947)

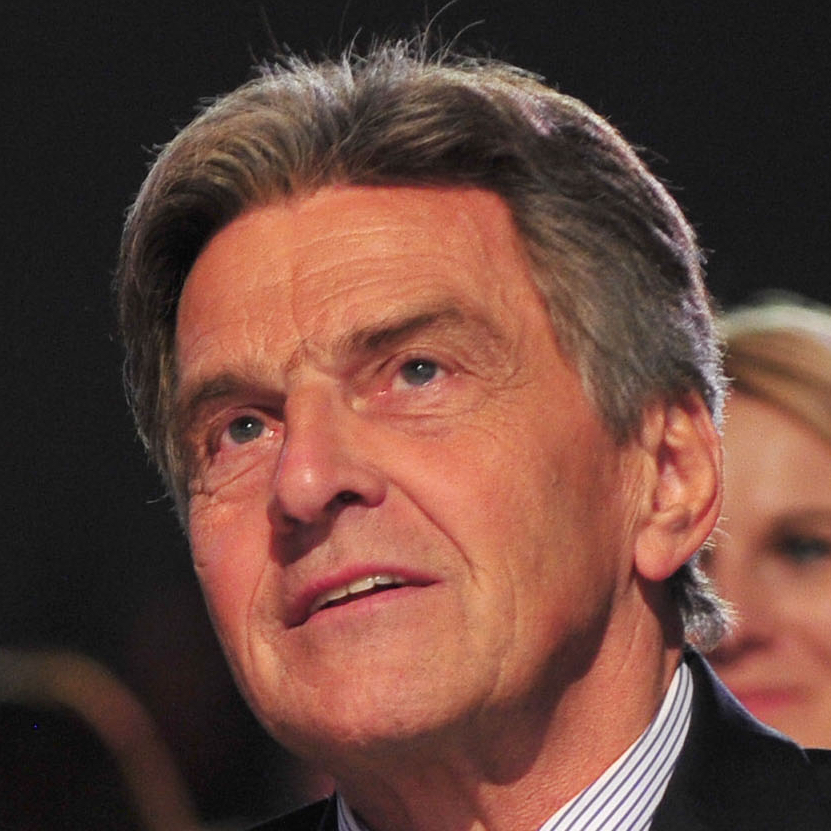
- Klima in 2014

Chancellor of Austria
- In office 28 January 1997 – 4 February 2000
- President: Thomas Klestil
- Vice-Chancellor: Wolfgang Schüssel
- Preceded by: Franz Vranitzky
- Succeeded by: Wolfgang Schüssel

Chair of the Social Democratic Party
- In office 9 April 1997 – 28 April 2000
- Preceded by: Franz Vranitzky
- Succeeded by: Alfred Gusenbauer

Minister of Finance
- In office 12 March 1996 – 28 January 1997
- Chancellor: Franz Vranitzky
- Preceded by: Andreas Staribacher
- Succeeded by: Rudolf Edlinger

Minister of Public Economy and Transport
- In office 3 April 1992 – 12 March 1996
- Chancellor: Franz Vranitzky
- Preceded by: Rudolf Streicher
- Succeeded by: Rudolf Scholten

Personal details
- Born: 4 June 1947 (age 79) Schwechat, Austria
- Party: Social Democratic Party
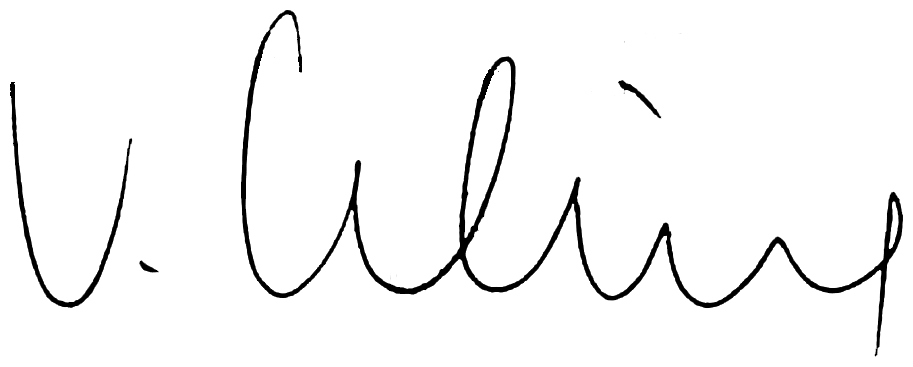
- Signature

Viktor Klima (born 4 June 1947) is a retired Austrian politician of the Social Democratic Party (SPÖ). He served as Chancellor of Austria from 1997 to 2000.

== Early life ==
Born in Schwechat, Lower Austria, in 1947, Viktor Klima was a member of various social-democratic youth organisations during his school years. From 1969 onward, he worked at OMV, Austria's then state-owned oil company, where he was appointed to the executive board in 1990. During his time at the company, he was involved in significant restructuring measures, including a cutting of approximately 3,000 positions, which was implemented without major labour unrest. Alongside his career, he studied business administration and business informatics at the TU Wien and the University of Vienna, graduating in 1981 with a magister degree.

== Political career ==
In 1992, SPÖ Chancellor Franz Vranitzky brought Klima into his government, where he served as Minister of State Industry and Transport until 1996. In that position he oversaw the restructuring and partial privatisation of major state-owned enterprises. He also negotiated a transit agreement with the European Union, with Austria being a key transit country in Central Europe.

His performance in public debates, including televised confrontations with right-wing Freedom Party of Austria (FPÖ) leader Jörg Haider, strengthened his standing within the party. He was appointed Finance Minister in 1996, and pursued a policy of fiscal consolidation aimed at reducing Austria’s public deficit and ensuring the country’s eligibility to join the first group of states adopting the euro. He held the office until 1997, when Vranitzky resigned as chancellor.

== Chancellor of Austria ==
In 1997, upon Vranitzky's resignation as chancellor, Klima was elected chairman of the SPÖ and was sworn in as Chancellor, having renewed the grand coalition between the SPÖ and the Austrian People's Party (ÖVP), with Wolfgang Schüssel serving as his vice chancellor.

As Chancellor, Klima placed emphasis on European integration, advocating for closer cooperation among EU member states in the field of employment policy and supporting strengthening economic coordination following the introduction of the Economic and Monetary Union (EMU) on 1 January 1999. Klima maintained Austria’s official position of military neutrality and opposed NATO membership, despite ongoing domestic debate and differing views within the governing coalition.

In the 1999 election, the SPÖ received the most votes, however, they dropped by almost 5% to 33% of the vote, their worst result in the Second Republic. Talks over the continuation of the coalition with the ÖVP, which had been in place since 1986, failed; and the ÖVP formed a coalition with the FPÖ, with Schüssel becoming chancellor. Within the SPÖ, Klima’s leadership has often been associated with the loss of the party’s three-decade hold on the chancellorship in 2000.

== Post-political career ==
In October 2000, Klima took up a senior management position with Volkswagen in Argentina, and later advanced to the company’s South American executive leadership. During his time in Argentina, he also served as an advisor to President Néstor Kirchner and subsequently to his wife and successor Cristina Fernández de Kirchner. Since retirement, he has lived with his family on a cattle farm near Buenos Aires.

Political offices
Preceded by Rudolf Streicher	Minister of Public Economy and Transport; 1992–1996	Succeeded by Rudolf Scholten
Preceded by Andreas Staribacher	Minister of Finance; 1996–1997	Succeeded by Rudolf Edlinger
Preceded by Franz Vranitzky	Chancellor of Austria; 1997–2000	Succeeded by Wolfgang Schüssel
Party political offices
Preceded by Franz Vranitzky	Chair of the Social Democratic Party; 1997–2000	Succeeded by Alfred Gusenbauer
