= Hubert Gorbach =

Austrian politician

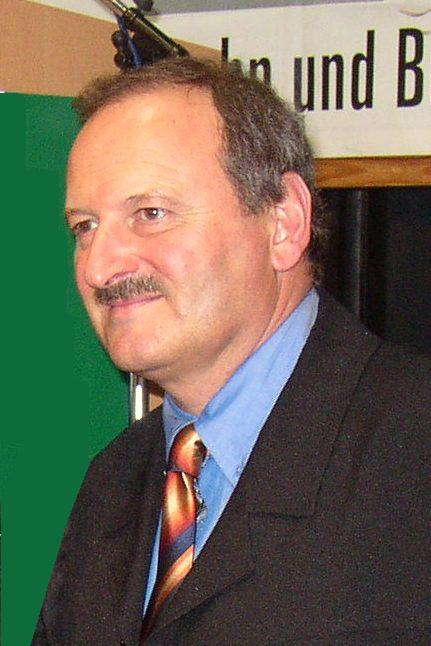
- Gorbach in 2005

Vice-Chancellor of Austria
- In office 21 October 2003 – 11 January 2007
- Chancellor: Wolfgang Schüssel
- Preceded by: Herbert Haupt
- Succeeded by: Wilhelm Molterer

Minister of Transport
- In office 28 February 2003 – 11 January 2007
- Chancellor: Wolfgang Schüssel
- Preceded by: Mathias Reichhold
- Succeeded by: Werner Faymann

Personal details
- Born: 27 July 1956 (age 69) Frastanz, Vorarlberg, Austria
- Party: Alliance for the Future

Hubert Gorbach (German pronunciation: [ˈhuːbɛʁt ˈɡɔʁˌbax]; born 27 July 1956) is an Austrian politician and a member of the Alliance for the Future of Austria (BZÖ). Gorbach graduated from a Handelsakademie (a type of secondary school focussed on business, accounting and economics), before working in the textile industry in his home state of Vorarlberg for a decade. Until April 2005, he was a leading member in the Freedom Party. Born in Vorarlberg, he was vice-governor (German: Landeshauptmannstellvertreter) of Vorarlberg until 2003.

In 2003, he succeeded Herbert Haupt as Vice-Chancellor of Austria. From February 2003 until June 2004, Gorbach was Federal Minister for Transport, Innovation and Technology in Austria in a coalition government headed by the People's Party.

== Controversies ==
After attending the 2010 Belarusian presidential election as an election observer, Gorbach praised Alexander Lukashenko's Belarus, stating its elections are "up to West European standards" and likening the elections to a "folk festival".

In October 2011, Hubert Gorbach lost his driving licence because of driving under the influence. His blood alcohol concentration (BAC) was alleged to have been 0.19 percent. Gorbach's driving licence was suspended for a period of 6 months, which led to allegations of preferential treatment on the part of the local authority in Feldkirch. There were reports that Gorbach's license had been reinstated a few days after the incident.

After retiring from politics, Gorbach received more than €268,000 from Telekom Austria. These payments were seen as payoff for favourable policies Gorbach enacted for the company during his tenure in government. Although Gorbach denied all allegations, he accepted a conditional discharge, which allowed him to avoid a criminal indictment by paying a fine of €1,680. Moreover, Gorbach had to pay partial restitution to Telekom Austria in the amount of €100,000 as well as partially covering the costs of the investigation. Commentators saw the discharge as too lenient considering the severity of the alleged offences. The fine was calculated based on Gorbach's net monthly income at the time, which was reported to be approximately €1,600.

In 2025, Gorbach received a fake knighthood from an organisation pretending to be the Sovereign Military Order of Malta. Said fake order is alleged to have taken payments from recipients in exchange for fake knighthoods.

== Personal life ==
He is married and is interested in horses.

== Notes ==
Political offices
Preceded by Herbert Haupt	Vice Chancellor of Austria; 2003– 2007	Succeeded by Wilhelm Molterer
