= Wolfgang Schüssel =

Chancellor of Austria from 2000 to 2007

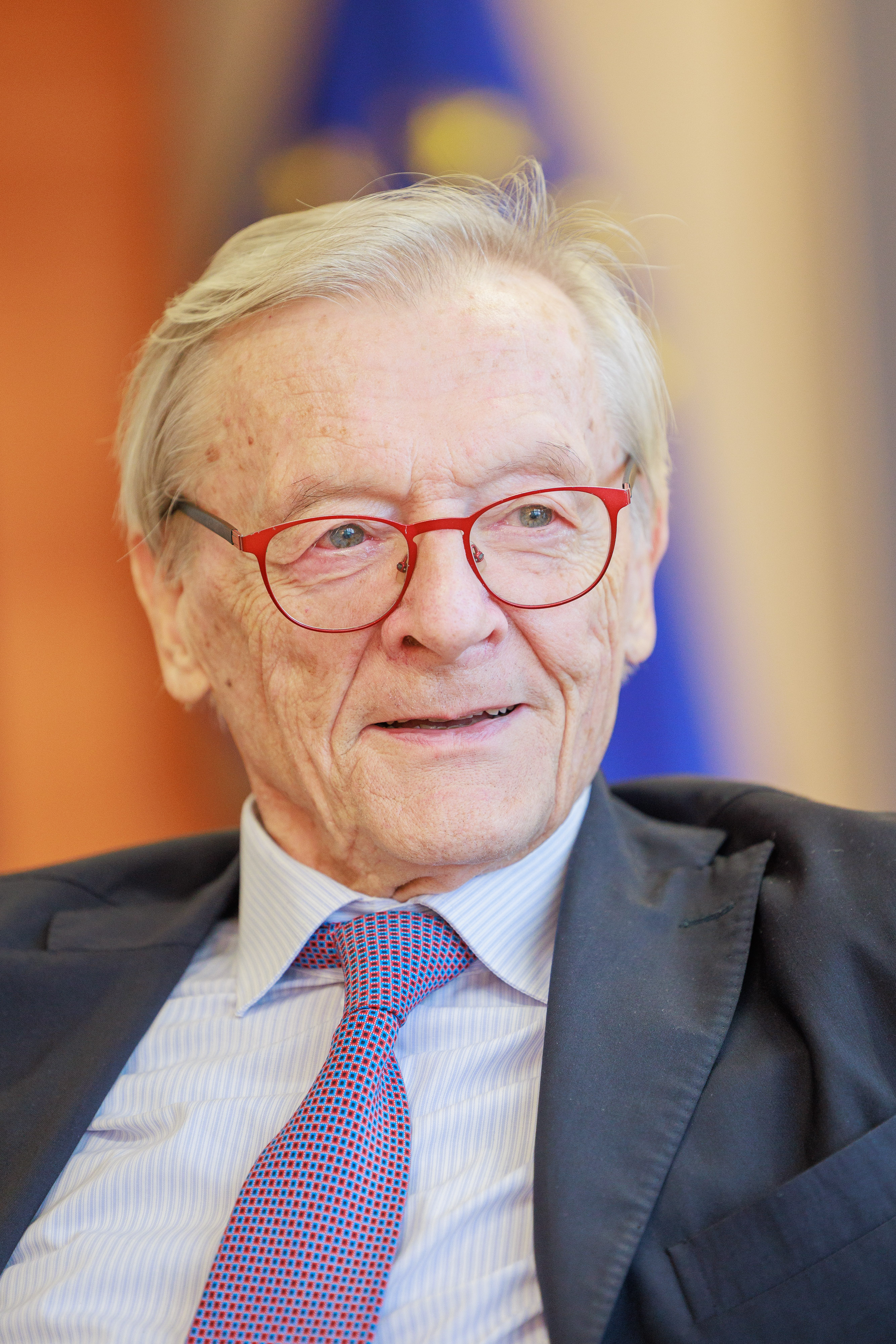
- Schüssel in 2024

Chancellor of Austria
- In office 4 February 2000 – 11 January 2007
- President: Thomas Klestil; Heinz Fischer
- Vice-Chancellor: Susanne Riess-Passer; Herbert Haupt; Hubert Gorbach
- Preceded by: Viktor Klima
- Succeeded by: Alfred Gusenbauer

Vice-Chancellor of Austria
- In office 4 May 1995 – 4 February 2000
- Chancellor: Franz Vranitzky; Viktor Klima
- Preceded by: Erhard Busek
- Succeeded by: Susanne Riess-Passer

Minister of Foreign Affairs
- In office 4 May 1995 – 4 February 2000
- Chancellor: Franz Vranitzky; Viktor Klima
- Preceded by: Alois Mock
- Succeeded by: Benita Ferrero-Waldner

Minister of Economic Affairs
- In office 24 April 1989 – 4 May 1995
- Chancellor: Franz Vranitzky
- Preceded by: Robert Graf
- Succeeded by: Johannes Ditz

Personal details
- Born: 7 June 1945 (age 81) Vienna, Austria
- Party: Austrian People's Party
- Education: University of Vienna

Wolfgang Schüssel (German pronunciation: [ˈvɔlfɡaŋ ˈʃʏsl̩]; born 7 June 1945) is a retired Austrian politician. He was Chancellor of Austria for two consecutive terms from February 2000 to January 2007. While being recognised as a rare example of an active reformer in contemporary Austrian politics, his governments were also highly controversial from the beginning, starting with the fact that he formed a coalition government with Jörg Haider's Freedom Party of Austria (FPÖ) on both occasions. In 2011, he retired from being an active member of parliament due to a multitude of charges of corruption against members of his governments.

== Early life, education, and start in politics ==
Born in Vienna, Schüssel attended that city's Schottengymnasium, a well known Roman Catholic gymnasium for boys, where he took his Matura exams in 1963. He went on to study at the University of Vienna, receiving a doctorate in law in 1968.

Schüssel was secretary of the parliamentary group of the Austrian People's Party from 1968 to 1975. From 1975 to 1991, he was secretary general of the Austrian Business Federation, a sub-organization of the Austrian People's Party.

== Minister in the "Grand Coalition" ==
He became Minister for Economic Affairs on 24 April 1989 in a coalition government under Chancellor Franz Vranitzky (SPÖ) formed by the Social Democratic Party (SPÖ) and the Austrian People's Party (ÖVP).

On 22 April 1995, at the 30th Party Congress of the ÖVP, Schüssel staged a leadership coup and ousted Erhard Busek as chairman of the Austrian People's Party. He also replaced the party's ministers in the governing coalition.

On 4 May 1995, Schüssel replaced Busek as vice-chancellor in Franz Vranitzky's fourth government, and also took over as Minister for Foreign Affairs. He held the same posts in Chancellor Vranitzky's fifth Cabinet, as well as the first cabinet of Chancellor Viktor Klima's (SPÖ).

== Chancellor of Austria ==
=== The Schüssel I government ===
In the 1999 election, Schüssel's ÖVP finished third, trailing Jörg Haider's Freedom Party (FPÖ) by 415 votes. After a series of talks to renew the grand coalition with the SPÖ failed, Schüssel sought a coalition with the Freedom Party.

Jörg Haider, as leader of the larger party, would typically have been the presumptive chancellor, with Schüssel remaining vice chancellor. However, it was apparent that Haider was too controversial to serve in the government, let alone lead it. The FPÖ thus agreed to support Schüssel as chancellor, and Haider did not join the cabinet. Schüssel was sworn in on 4 February 2000, with Haider's successor as FPÖ leader, Susanne Riess-Passer, as vice chancellor. His government was the first in 30 years not to be led by the SPÖ.

Schüssel's government was immediately highly controversial due to the inclusion of the Freedom Party. Schüssel was perceived as having breached the long-standing cordon sanitaire against right-wing populist parties in Europe. This and the association of Haider with the government sparked widespread criticism both domestically and internationally. The Guardian reported that, during the decisive days of Schüssel's negotiations, caretaker Chancellor Viktor Klima had "urged fellow EU leaders to help influence the coalition bargaining".

The ÖVP had been a member of every government from 1945 to 1970 and from 1986 onwards, but even in opposition had never been completely excluded from power. The post-war tradition of consensus-building meant that representatives of all major interest groups in the country were to be consulted before any policy was enacted. Schüssel, however, broke with that tradition in order to rapidly implement the reforms he felt necessary. This was received poorly by many Austrians, who considered the consensus-building approach to be an unwritten part of the constitution. Between 2000 and 2002, there were weekly protests throughout Vienna against the government, dubbed the Donnerstagsdemonstrationen (Thursday demonstrations).

==== The "EU Sanctions" ====
The Schüssel government was received poorly by governments internationally, including those of the fourteen other European Union member states, due to its cooperation with the FPÖ. An initiative was organised, with encouragement from much of the Austrian left-wing, to express international disapproval. Because nothing in the legal framework of the European Union enabled official action to be taken, informal "sanctions" were imposed – for several months, many other national leaders engaged in social and diplomatic ostracism of the Schüssel government, refusing any unnecessary interaction. Participants included French President Jacques Chirac, German Chancellor Gerhard Schröder, and leading Belgian politicians. Government supporters frequently blamed the SPÖ and President Thomas Klestil for this campaign, accusing them of disloyalty to Austria.

After several months without any change in the situation, a delegation of high-ranking EU diplomats – Martti Ahtisaari, Marcelino Oreja and Jochen Frowein – was sent to Austria to examine the political situation and determine whether the so-called "sanctions" could be lifted. Their report did not find conditions that would permit EU members to institute any official measures under EU law, but did present proposals for how EU law could be modified to resolve such a situation in the future. These proposals were incorporated in the Treaty of Nice, ratified in 2001. Following the report, EU leaders quietly "lifted" the sanctions and returned to normality during the summer of 2000, despite the situation in Austria remaining unchanged.

=== The Schüssel II government ===
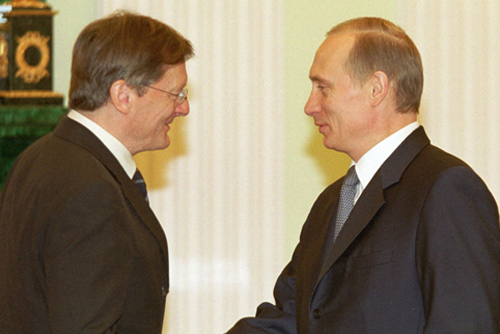
Schüssel with Russian President Vladimir Putin on 29 January 2002

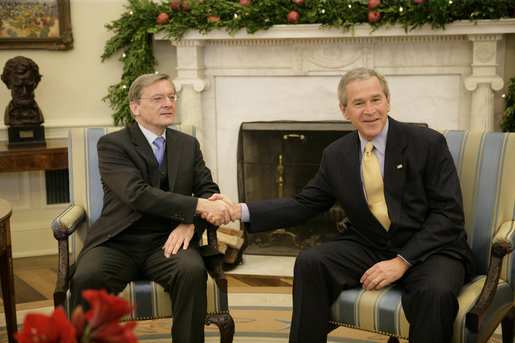
Schüssel with U.S. President George W. Bush on 8 December 2005

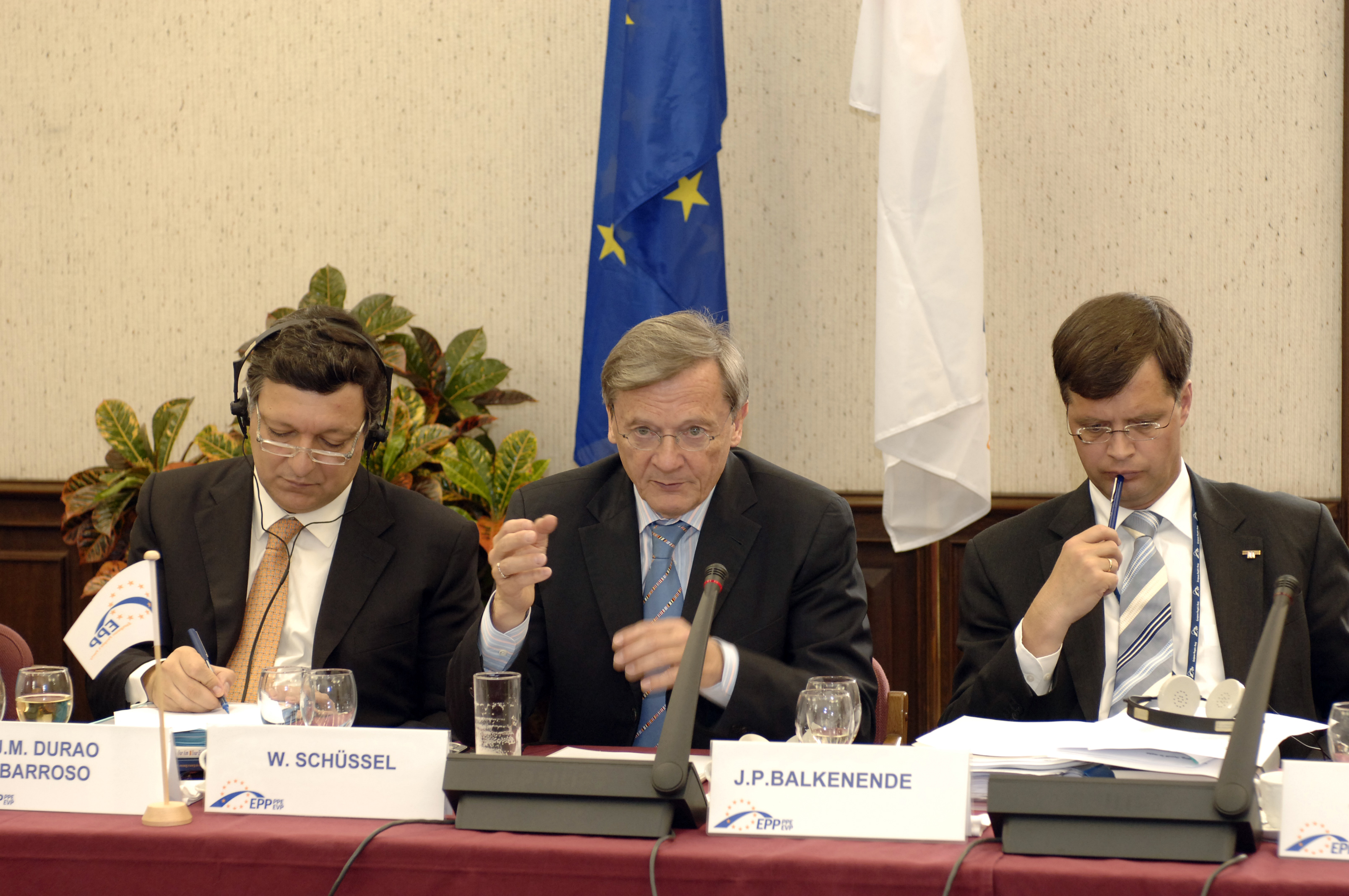
Schüssel with President of the European Commission José Manuel Barroso and Dutch Prime Minister Jan Peter Balkenende with in the EPP Summit in Meise, 15 May 2006

By the summer of 2002, a series of setbacks in local and regional elections had resulted in considerable internal strife in the FPÖ. When the leading figures of the more pragmatic wing of the party, Vice-Chancellor Susanne Riess-Passer and Finance Minister Karl-Heinz Grasser, announced their resignations, Schüssel called early elections. The ÖVP recorded its best result since 1983, winning 42.3% of votes cast and overtaking the SPÖ for the first time since 1966. After negotiating with both the SPÖ and The Greens, Schüssel decided to renew the coalition with the FPÖ, which had won just 10% of votes. On 28 February 2003, Schüssel was sworn in as Chancellor for a second time.

In April 2005, the FPÖ effectively split into two parties. The bulk of the party, including Haider, the FPÖ cabinet ministers, and most of the FPÖ parliamentary caucus, formed the Alliance for the Future of Austria (BZÖ), while most party members and state branches remained with the old party. Despite this change, Schüssel continued the coalition, which served out the remainder of the legislative term.

In the 2006 legislative election, the ÖVP lost many of the voters it had won over in 2002 and fell back to second place against the SPÖ. In addition, the BZÖ won just 7 seats, leaving the outgoing government well short of a majority. While a three-party coalition with both the FPÖ and BZÖ would reach a slim majority, Schüssel stated after the election that a coalition with either party "would not be reasonable". The SPÖ and ÖVP began the process of negotiating a grand coalition. Schüssel served as caretaker Chancellor until the new government was sworn in on 11 January 2007; he also served briefly as acting Minister of the Interior following the death of Liese Prokop on 31 December 2006.

=== President of the European Council, 2006 ===
Austria succeeded the United Kingdom as holder of the Presidency of the European Council on 1 January 2006. In the presence of German Chancellor Angela Merkel, Schüssel promised to lead the European Union "hand in hand" with Germany, and Merkel promised that Germany would do everything to "help" Austria during its presidency and make it a success. Schüssel also stated that Austria needed "some friends of the presidency". This led to Brussels diplomats describing the Austrian presidency as "the small German presidency", according to French newspaper Le Figaro.

== Chairman of the ÖVP Parliamentary Group, 2006–2008 ==
Following the 2006 election, Schüssel became chairman of the ÖVP Parliamentary Group. He announced after the September 2008 election that he would continue to sit in parliament only as a backbencher; Josef Pröll was to replace him as chairman of the ÖVP Parliamentary Group. In addition to his parliamentary work, Schüssel served on the Commission of Eminent Persons on The Role of the IAEA to 2020 and Beyond, chaired by Ernesto Zedillo, whose report Reinforcing the Global Nuclear Order for Peace and Prosperity was launched in June 2008.

In 2011, Schüssel retired from parliament due to massive charges of corruption against members of the governments led by him originating from the Telekom Austria Affair.

== Policies ==
The government's attempts at achieving a balanced budget (called "Nulldefizit") – while being more successful than most of its contemporary initiatives abroad – failed. Changes involved a mixture of raising taxes and fees on the one hand and cost-cutting measures on the other, which proved highly visible and prompted significant criticism. For example, the Austrian education system suffered considerably, as shown by the PISA study released in 2004: many salaries and expensive projects were cut at universities, even though the government proclaimed it would bring teaching and research to a "world-class" level. Cost-cutting in the security sector was blamed for an increase in crime.

At the same time, Schüssel's government increased public spending in certain areas. For example, the new "Kindergeld" (child benefit) to help families replaced the old "Karenzgeld", which was dependent on the recipient being employed. This change was a nod to the Freedom Party, which had campaigned for this measure.

The decision to replace the old Draken fighter planes of the Bundesheer with 18 Eurofighters (originally 24 were ordered, this number was reduced after the 2002 floods) was seen as waste of money by the opposition, most of all because of the attempts to save money in almost every area of the public administration. The government's arguments for this were that the Austrian State Treaty, according to which Austria needs to be able to defend herself, is to be read to imply that Austria must be in complete control of her airspace. The opposition argued that this goal could have been reached in a much cheaper way.

Starting from around 2030, the unfavourable structure of the population pyramid had been forecast to create a ratio of active to retired workers of 1:1. Schüssel's pension reform made provision for this in the reduction of future pensions and raising of the retirement age. Schüssel's reform of the Austrian pension system is more broad-sweeping and thus more likely to be effective than all previous reforms in this area combined. Demographics experts insisted that it ideally should have gone further, whereas the SPÖ and the Austrian Federation of Trade Unions (ÖGB) protested heavily and argued that the pension losses, limited by Schüssel to 10% and later reduced to 5%, were excessive. Such measures laid the groundwork for later military reform and pension reform. Mandatory military service to reduce to six months or even its abolition. From 2005 onwards, corporate tax was cut to 25% to stimulate investment and economic growth. This was an example of harmonisation toward neighbouring taxes as recent EU and Schengen area member Slovakia had consistently lower tax rates. However, critics argued that such a tax advantage for firms was unfair to many sole traders.

== Life after politics ==
Since his retirement from Austrian politics, Schüssel has held paid and unpaid positions, including the following:

=== Corporate boards ===
- Investcorp, member of the European Advisory Board (since 2011)
- RWE, member of the supervisory board (since 2010)
- Deutsche Vermögensberatung (DVAG), member of the advisory board
- Lukoil, member of the board of directors (2019–2022)
- MTS, member of the board of directors (2018–2019)

=== Non-profit organizations ===
- Konrad Adenauer Foundation, chairman of the board of trustees (since 2015)
- United Europe, president (since 2013)
- World Economic Forum (WEF), member of the Global Agenda Council on Public Finance and Social Protection Systems
- DER Dialog Europe-Russia, member of the board (since 2011)
- Foreign Policy and United Nations Association of Austria (ÖAGVN), president (since 2008)
- Bertelsmann Stiftung, member of the board of trustees (2007 to 2016)
- Allensbach Institute, member of the board of trustees
- Broader European Leadership Agenda (BELA), member of the advisory board
- Club of Madrid, Member
- Gesellschaft für Außenpolitik, member of the international advisory board
- Wilfried Martens Centre for European Studies, member of the Honorary Board
- Austrian Society for China Studies (ÖGCF), member of the Presidium
- European Council on Foreign Relations (ECFR), member
- European Policy Centre (EPC), program chair "European Politics and Institutions"
- Global Leadership Foundation, member

When the European People's Party (EPP) membership of Hungarian party Fidesz was suspended in 2019, EPP president Joseph Daul appointed Schüssel – alongside Herman van Rompuy and Hans-Gert Pöttering – to a group of high-level experts who were mandated to monitor Fidesz's compliance with EPP values.

== Honours and awards ==
- 7 July 1995: Grand Cross of the Order of Isabella the Catholic
- 1996: Grand Cross of the Royal Norwegian Order of Merit
- 8 June 2000: Grand Cross with Diamonds of the Order of Merit of the Principality of Liechtenstein
- 2004: Grand Cross of the Order of the Star of Romania
- 2006: Grand Cross of Order of Merit of the Republic of Hungary
- 20 January 2006: Grand Cross of the Order of Merit of the Republic of Poland ("for outstanding achievements in the development of Polish-Austrian cooperation, for their involvement in activities on behalf of those affected by the Third Reich")
- 22 December 2006: Grand Cross of the Grand Order of Queen Jelena
- 2007: Order of Merit of Baden-Württemberg
- 2007: Bavarian Order of Merit
- Honorary Citizen of Tirana, Albania.

Political offices
Preceded by Robert Graf	Minister of Economic Affairs; 1989–1995	Succeeded by Johannes Ditz
Preceded by Erhard Busek	Vice-Chancellor of Austria; 1995–2000	Succeeded by Susanne Riess-Passer
Preceded by Alois Mock	Minister of Foreign Affairs; 1995–2000	Succeeded by Benita Ferrero-Waldner
Preceded by Viktor Klima	Chancellor of Austria; 2000–2007	Succeeded by Alfred Gusenbauer
Preceded by Tony Blair	President of the European Council; 2006	Succeeded by Matti Vanhanen
Party political offices
Preceded by Erhard Busek	Chair of the People's Party; 1995–2007	Succeeded by Wilhelm Molterer
