= Herbert Haupt =

Austrian politician (born 1947)

Vice-Chancellor of Austria
- In office 28 February 2003 – 21 October 2003
- Chancellor: Wolfgang Schüssel
- Preceded by: Susanne Riess-Passer
- Succeeded by: Hubert Gorbach

Chair of the Freedom Party
- In office 18 October 2002 – 3 July 2004
- Preceded by: Mathias Reichhold
- Succeeded by: Ursula Haubner

Minister of Social Affairs
- In office 24 October 2000 – 25 January 2005
- Chancellor: Wolfgang Schüssel
- Preceded by: Elisabeth Sickl
- Succeeded by: Ursula Haubner

Third President of the National Council
- In office 7 November 1994 – 15 January 1996
- Preceded by: Heide Schmidt
- Succeeded by: Wilhelm Brauneder

Personal details
- Born: 28 September 1947 (age 78) Seeboden, Carinthia
- Party: Freedom Party

Herbert Haupt (German pronunciation: [ˈhɛʁbɛʁt ˈhaʊpt]; born 28 September 1947) is an Austrian politician and former party chairman of the Austrian Freedom Party. Haupt was Minister of Social Affairs from 2000 until 2005 in a coalition government headed by Wolfgang Schüssel. He was also Vice Chancellor of Austria from 28 February 2003 until 20 October 2003.

He is still a member of the National Council of Austria, now representing the Alliance for the Future of Austria (BZÖ) party founded by Jörg Haider in April 2005.

He stepped down as Minister of Social Affairs on 25 January 2005 and was succeeded by Ursula Haubner.

== See also ==
- Politics of Austria

Political offices
Preceded by Susanne Riess-Passer	Vice Chancellor of Austria; 2003	Succeeded by Hubert Gorbach
Party political offices
Preceded by Mathias Reichhold	Chair of the Freedom Party; 2002–2004	Succeeded by Ursula Haubner
