= Federal Ministry of Innovation, Mobility and Infrastructure =

Government ministry of Austria

Ministry of Climate Action, Environment, Energy, Mobility, Innovation and Technology
- Bundesministerium für Klimaschutz, Umwelt, Energie, Mobilität, Innovation und Technologie

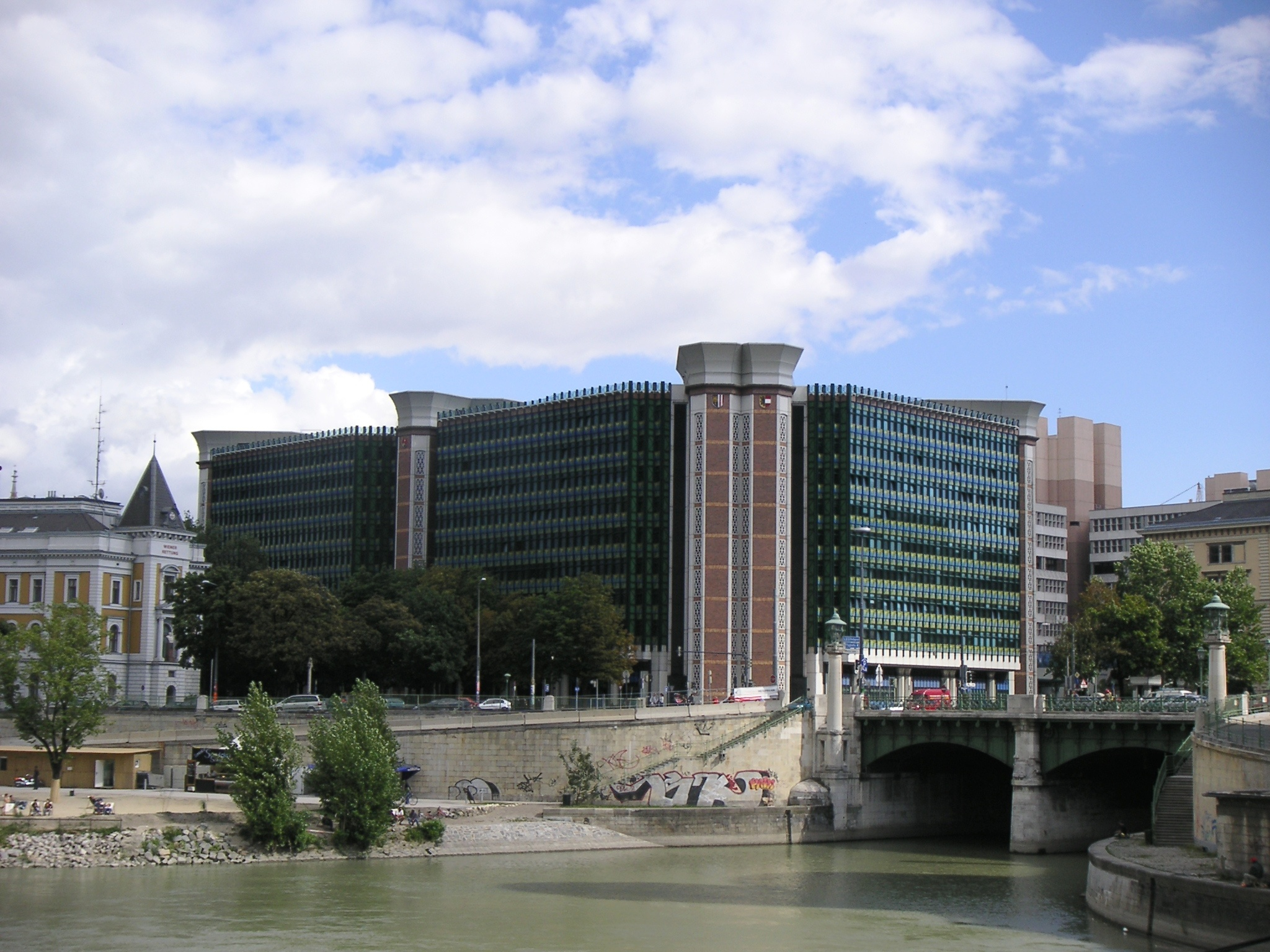

Ministry overview
- Formed: 1896; 130 years ago (as Imperial Ministry of Railways)
- Headquarters: Stubenring 1, Innere Stadt, Vienna; 48°12′38″N 16°23′9″E
- Annual budget: €9,82 billion (FY 2022)
- Ministry executives: Peter Hanke, Minister; Herbert Kasser, Secretary General
- Child ministry: Austrian Patent Office
- Website: bmk.gv.at

The Ministry of Climate Action, Environment, Energy, Mobility, Innovation and Technology (German: Bundesministerium für Klimaschutz, Umwelt, Energie, Mobilität, Innovation und Technologie, lit. 'Federal Ministry for Climate Action, the Environment, Energy, Mobility, Innovation and Technology') is the government ministry of Austria in charge of traffic, research, innovation, energy, and environmental protection.

== Overview ==
First established in 1896, its exact name and portfolio have undergone numerous changes throughout the years. From 2000 to 2020, the ministry was officially called the Ministry for Transport, Innovation and Technology (Bundesministerium für Verkehr, Innovation und Technologie or BMVIT). It is tasked, in addition to its core regulatory and infrastructure responsibilities, with the promotion of scientific research and technological progress. The ministry regulates motor vehicles, railways, waterways, aviation safety, air traffic control, air weather services, public transport, the postal system, and the telecommunications sector.

It maintains the autobahns and other national highways. The Ministry also owns and supervises the via donau, a corporation charged with the maintenance of the Danube as a commercial shipping route and wildlife reserve. Since January 2020, the ministry is additionally responsible for environmental protection, energy, and environmental technology.

== History ==
The Ministry was first established as the Cisleithanian Ministry of Railways in 1896; previously, railways had been the responsibility of the Ministry of Commerce (Handelsministerium). In 1923, the Ministry of Railways was merged back into the Ministry of Commerce.

In its current form and under its modern common name, the Ministry of Transport appeared in 1945. Its areas of responsibility were railways, the postal system, shipping, and public transport. In 1950, it gained responsibility for aviation affairs. In 1973, it was put in charge of a number of additional areas, including but not limited to motor vehicles, traffic police matters, and mineral oil pipelines. On and off, the Ministry also supervised Austria's nationalized heavy industry, exercising direct control over some of the country's largest employers and a sizable percentage of the nation's GDP. From 1950 to 1973 it also controlled the electricity sector.

The Ministry was merged with the Ministry of Economic Affairs in 1996. When it was reestablished in 2000, it had acquired responsibility for national road construction and maintenance.

On 29 January 2020, the Ministry was renamed into Federal Ministry for Climate Action, Environment, Energy, Mobility, Innovation and Technology.

On 1 April 2025, it was renamed yet again acquiring its current responsibilities as the Federal Ministry of Innovation, Mobility and Infrastructure.

== Responsibilities ==
As of January 2020, the Ministry was charged with regulating, supervising, or managing, respectively:

- climate action and environmental protection;
- waste management and rehabilitation of contaminated sites;
- species conservation;
- protection of natural caves;
- protection from ionizing radiation;
- traffic and commerce in poisonous substances;
- the energy sector, excepting matters within the purview of the Federal Ministry for Digital and Economic Affairs;
- traffic policy;
- transportation by railway, navigation and aviation;
- motor vehicle traffic and matters of traffic police; accident research;
- national roads;
- companies responsible for construction and maintenance of national roads by national law;
- hydraulic engineering waterways regarding the navigable rivers Danube and March as well as Thaya river along the international border between Bernhardsthal until ending in the March river and of other waterways, as well as of water supply and sewerage systems, to the extent they are not within the powers of some other ministry; administration of the Marchfeld Canal;
- commercial transportation of passengers and goods including commercial transportation of goods in pipelines with the exception of the management of water supply systems;
- transportation of persons and goods with company-owned vehicles;
- railways, including the construction and administration of buildings and state-owned real estate assigned to railway use; exercise of shareholders' rights due to stakes the government owns in other railway companies;
- the Council of Research and Technological Development (Rat für Forschung und Technologieentwicklung);
- scientific and technological research, except for those areas within the purview of the Ministry of Digital and Economic Affairs;
- industrial property rights, in particular patents and utility model protection, patent law attorneys and their professional representation; protection of designs, brand names and other product designations;
- outer space affairs.

== Structure ==
Since January 2020, the ministry consists of the Minister and her personal staff (Kabinett), the office of the general secretary, and seven departments (Sektionen):

1. Presidium and international affairs (Präsidium und internationale Angelegenheiten)
2. Infrastructure planning and financing; coordination (Infrastrukturplanung und -finanzierung, Koordination)
3. Innovation and Technology (Innovation und Technologie)
4. Transport (Verkehr)
5. Waste Management, Chemicals Policy and Environment Technology (Abfallwirtschaft, Chemiepolitik und Umwelttechnologie)
6. Energy (Energie)
7. Climate and Environmental Protection (Klima- und Umweltschutz)

The Minister and her staff are political appointees; the general secretary and the section heads are career civil servants.
