= List of ministers of social affairs (Austria) =

Minister of Social Affairs
- Bundesminister für Soziales, Gesundheit, Pflege und Konsumentenschutz
- Coat of arms

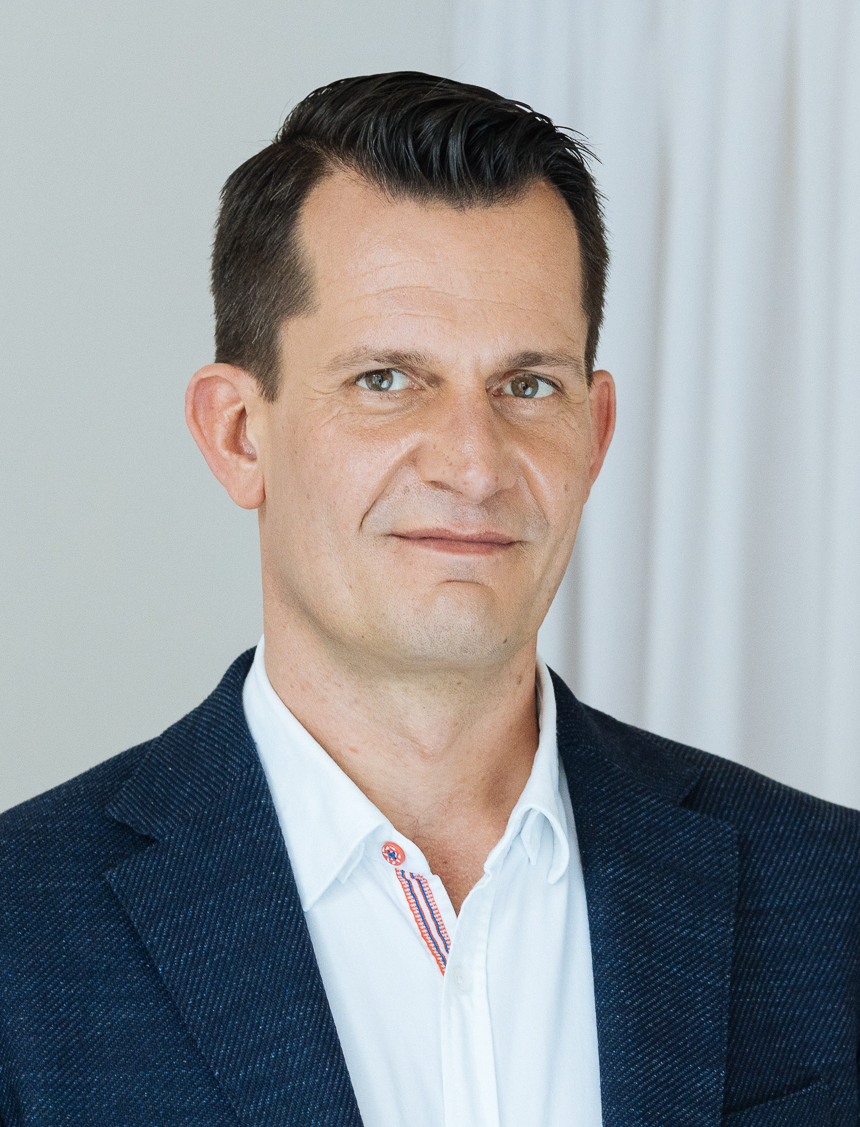
- Incumbent; Wolfgang Mückstein since 13 April 2021
- Federal Ministry of Social Affairs, Health, Care and Consumer Protection
- Style: Mr. Minister (normal); His Excellency (diplomatic)
- Type: Minister
- Status: Supreme executive organ
- Member of: Cabinet
- Seat: Ministry of Social Affairs; Stubenring 1, Innere Stadt, Vienna
- Nominator: Political parties
- Appointer: The president on advice of the chancellor
- Constituting instrument: Constitution of Austria
- First holder: Johann Böhm
- Website: www.sozialministerium.at

The minister of social affairs, health, care and consumer protection (German: Bundesminister für Soziales, Gesundheit, Pflege und Konsumentenschutz) heads the Federal Ministry of Social Affairs, Health, Care and Consumer Protection.

== List ==
=== First Republic ===
№	Portrait	Name (Born-Died)	Term			Political party	Government
№	Portrait	Name (Born-Died)	Took office	Left office (Note: Based on when the successor took office)	Duration	Political party	Government
State Secretariat of Social Welfare (Staatsamt für soziale Fürsorge)
1	Ferdinand Hanusch	Ferdinand Hanusch (1866–1923)	30 October 1918	15 March 1919	136 days	SPÖ	Renner I Cabinet
State Secretariat of Social Affairs (Staatsamt für soziale Verwaltung)
1	Ferdinand Hanusch	Ferdinand Hanusch (1866–1923)	15 March 1919	22 October 1920	1 year, 221 days	SPÖ	Renner II Cabinet–II; Mayr I Cabinet
–	Eduard Heinl	Eduard Heinl (1880–1957); Acting	22 October 1920	20 November 1920	29 days	CS	Mayr I Cabinet
Ministry of Social Affairs (Bundesministerium für soziale Verwaltung)
2	Josef Resch [de]	Josef Resch (1880–1939)	20 November 1920	21 June 1921	244 days	CS	Mayr II Cabinet
3	Franz Pauer [de]	Franz Pauer (1870–1936)	21 June 1921	31 May 1922	344 days	Independent	Schober I Cabinet; Breisky Cabinet; Schober II Cabinet
4	Richard Schmitz	Richard Schmitz (1885–1954)	31 May 1922	20 November 1924	2 years, 173 days	CS	Seipel I Cabinet–II–III
(2)	Josef Resch [de]	Josef Resch (1880–1939)	20 November 1924	26 September 1929	4 years, 310 days	CS	Ramek I Cabinet–II; Seipel IV Cabinet–II; Streeruwitz Cabinet
5	Theodor Innitzer	Theodor Innitzer (1875–1955)	26 September 1929	30 September 1930	1 year, 4 days	CS	Schober III Cabinet
–	Richard Schmitz	Richard Schmitz (1885–1954); Acting	30 September 1930	4 December 1930	65 days	CS	Vaugoin Cabinet
(2)	Josef Resch [de]	Josef Resch (1880–1939)	4 December 1930	15 April 1931	132 days	CS	Ender Cabinet
–	Otto Ender	Otto Ender (1875–1960); Acting	15 April 1931	20 June 1931	66 days	CS	Ender Cabinet
(2)	Josef Resch [de]	Josef Resch (1880–1939)	20 June 1931	11 March 1933	1 year, 264 days	CS	Buresch I Cabinet–II; Dollfuss I Cabinet–II
6	Robert Kerber [de]	Robert Kerber (1884–1977)	11 March 1933	21 September 1933	194 days	CS	Dollfuss II Cabinet
7	Richard Schmitz [de]	Richard Schmitz (1885–1954)	21 September 1933	16 February 1934	148 days	CS	Schuschnigg I Cabinet
8	Odo Neustädter-Stürmer [de]	Odo Neustädter-Stürmer (1885–1938)	16 February 1934	17 October 1935	1 year, 243 days	VF	Schuschnigg I Cabinet
9	Josef Dobretsberger [de]	Josef Dobretsberger (1903–1970)	17 October 1935	14 May 1936	210 days	VF	Schuschnigg I Cabinet
(2)	Josef Resch [de]	Josef Resch (1880–1939)	14 May 1936	11 March 1938	1 year, 301 days	VF	Schuschnigg II Cabinet–II–III
10	Hugo Jury	Hugo Jury (1887–1945)	11 March 1938	13 March 1938	2 days	NSDAP	Seyss-Inquart Cabinet

=== Second Republic ===
№	Portrait	Name (Born-Died)	Term			Political party	Government
№	Portrait	Name (Born-Died)	Took office	Left office	Duration	Political party	Government
State Secretariat of Social Affairs (Staatsamt für soziale Verwaltung)
1	Johann Böhm [de]	Johann Böhm (1886–1959)	27 April 1945	20 December 1945	237 days	SPÖ	Renner IV Cabinet
Ministry of Social Affairs (Bundesministerium für soziale Verwaltung)
2	Karl Maisel [de]	Karl Maisel (1890–1982)	20 December 1945	23 January 1956	10 years, 34 days	SPÖ	Figl I Cabinet–II–III; Raab I Cabinet
3	Anton Proksch [de]	Anton Proksch (1897–1975)	23 January 1956	19 April 1966	10 years, 86 days	SPÖ	Raab I Cabinet–II–III–IV; Gorbach I Cabinet–II; Klaus I Cabinet
4	Grete Rehor	Grete Rehor (1910–1987)	19 April 1966	21 April 1970	4 years, 2 days	ÖVP	Klaus II Cabinet
5	Rudolf Häuser [de]	Rudolf Häuser (1909–2000)	21 April 1970	1 October 1976	6 years, 163 days	SPÖ	Kreisky I Cabinet–II–III
6	Gerhard Weißenberg [de]	Gerhard Weißenberg (1920–1980)	1 October 1976	1 October 1980 †	4 years, 0 days	SPÖ	Kreisky III Cabinet–II
–	Herbert Salcher	Herbert Salcher (1929–2021); Acting	1 October 1980	9 October 1980	8 days	SPÖ	Kreisky IV Cabinet
7	Alfred Dallinger [de]	Alfred Dallinger (1926–1989)	9 October 1980	1 April 1987	6 years, 174 days	SPÖ	Kreisky IV Cabinet; Sinowatz Cabinet; Vranitzky I Cabinet–II
Ministry of Labor and Social Affairs (Bundesministerium für Arbeit und soziale Verwaltung)
7	Alfred Dallinger [de]	Alfred Dallinger (1926–1989)	1 April 1987	23 February 1989	1 year, 328 days	SPÖ	Vranitzky II Cabinet
–	Ferdinand Lacina	Ferdinand Lacina (born 1942); Acting	23 February 1989	10 March 1989	15 days	SPÖ	Vranitzky II Cabinet
8	Walter Geppert [de]	Walter Geppert (born 1939)	10 March 1989	17 December 1990	1 year, 282 days	SPÖ	Vranitzky II Cabinet
9	Josef Hesoun [de]	Josef Hesoun (1930–2003)	17 December 1990	6 April 1995	4 years, 110 days	SPÖ	Vranitzky III Cabinet–II
10	Franz Hums [de]	Franz Hums (1937–2015)	6 April 1995	28 January 1997	1 year, 297 days	SPÖ	Vranitzky IV Cabinet–II
11	Eleonora Hostasch	Eleonora Hostasch (born 1944)	28 January 1997	15 February 1997	18 days	SPÖ	Klima Cabinet
Ministry of Labor, Health and Social Affairs (Bundesministerium für Arbeit, Gesundheit und soziale Verwaltung)
11	Eleonora Hostasch	Eleonora Hostasch (born 1944)	15 February 1997	4 February 2000	2 years, 354 days	SPÖ	Klima Cabinet
12	Elisabeth Sickl	Elisabeth Sickl (born 1940)	4 February 2000	1 April 2000	57 days	FPÖ	Schüssel I Cabinet
Ministry of Social Security and Generations (Bundesministerium für soziale Sicherheit und Generationen)
12	Elisabeth Sickl	Elisabeth Sickl (born 1940)	1 April 2000	24 October 2000	206 days	FPÖ	Schüssel I Cabinet
13	Herbert Haupt	Herbert Haupt (born 1947)	24 October 2000	1 May 2003	2 years, 189 days	FPÖ	Schüssel I Cabinet–II
Ministry of Social Security, Generations and Consumer Protection (Bundesministerium für soziale Sicherheit, Generationen und Konsumentenschutz)
13	Herbert Haupt	Herbert Haupt (born 1947)	1 May 2003	26 January 2005	1 year, 270 days	FPÖ	Schüssel II Cabinet
14	Ursula Haubner	Ursula Haubner (born 1945)	26 January 2005	11 January 2007	1 year, 350 days	FPÖ	Schüssel II Cabinet
15	Erwin Buchinger [de]	Erwin Buchinger (born 1955)	11 January 2007	1 March 2007	49 days	SPÖ	Gusenbauer Cabinet
Ministry of Social Security and Consumer Protection (Bundesministerium für soziale Sicherheit und Konsumentenschutz)
15	Erwin Buchinger [de]	Erwin Buchinger (born 1955)	1 March 2007	2 December 2008	1 year, 276 days	SPÖ	Gusenbauer Cabinet
16	Rudolf Hundstorfer	Rudolf Hundstorfer (1951–2019)	2 December 2008	1 February 2009	61 days	SPÖ	Faymann I Cabinet
Ministry of Labor, Social Security and Consumer Protection (Bundesministerium für Arbeit, soziale Sicherheit und Konsumentenschutz)
16	Rudolf Hundstorfer	Rudolf Hundstorfer (1951–2019)	1 February 2009	26 January 2016	6 years, 359 days	SPÖ	Faymann I Cabinet–II
17	Alois Stöger	Alois Stöger (born 1960)	26 January 2016	18 December 2017	1 year, 326 days	SPÖ	Faymann II Cabinet; Kern Cabinet
18	Beate Hartinger-Klein	Beate Hartinger-Klein (born 1959)	18 December 2017	8 January 2018	21 days	FPÖ	Kurz I Cabinet
Ministry of Labor, Social Affairs, Health and Consumer Protection (Bundesministerium für Arbeit, Soziales, Gesundheit und Konsumentenschutz)
18	Beate Hartinger-Klein	Beate Hartinger-Klein (born 1959)	8 January 2018	20 May 2019	1 year, 132 days	FPÖ	Kurz I Cabinet
19	Walter Pöltner	Walter Pöltner (born 1952)	22 May 2019	3 June 2019	12 days	Independent	Kurz I Cabinet
20	Brigitte Zarfl	Brigitte Zarfl (born 1962)	3 June 2019	7 January 2020	218 days	Independent	Bierlein Cabinet
21	Rudolf Anschober	Rudolf Anschober (born 1960)	7 January 2020	29 January 2020	22 days	Greens	Kurz II Cabinet
Ministry of Social Affairs, Health, Care and Consumer Protection (Bundesministerium für Soziales, Gesundheit, Pflege und Konsumentenschutz)
21	Rudolf Anschober	Rudolf Anschober (born 1960)	29 January 2020	13 April 2021	1 year, 74 days	Greens	Kurz II Cabinet
22	Wolfgang Mückstein	Wolfgang Mückstein (born 1974)	19 April 2021	Incumbent	5 years, 141 days	Greens	Kurz II Cabinet
