= Beate Hartinger-Klein =

Austrian politician (born 1959)

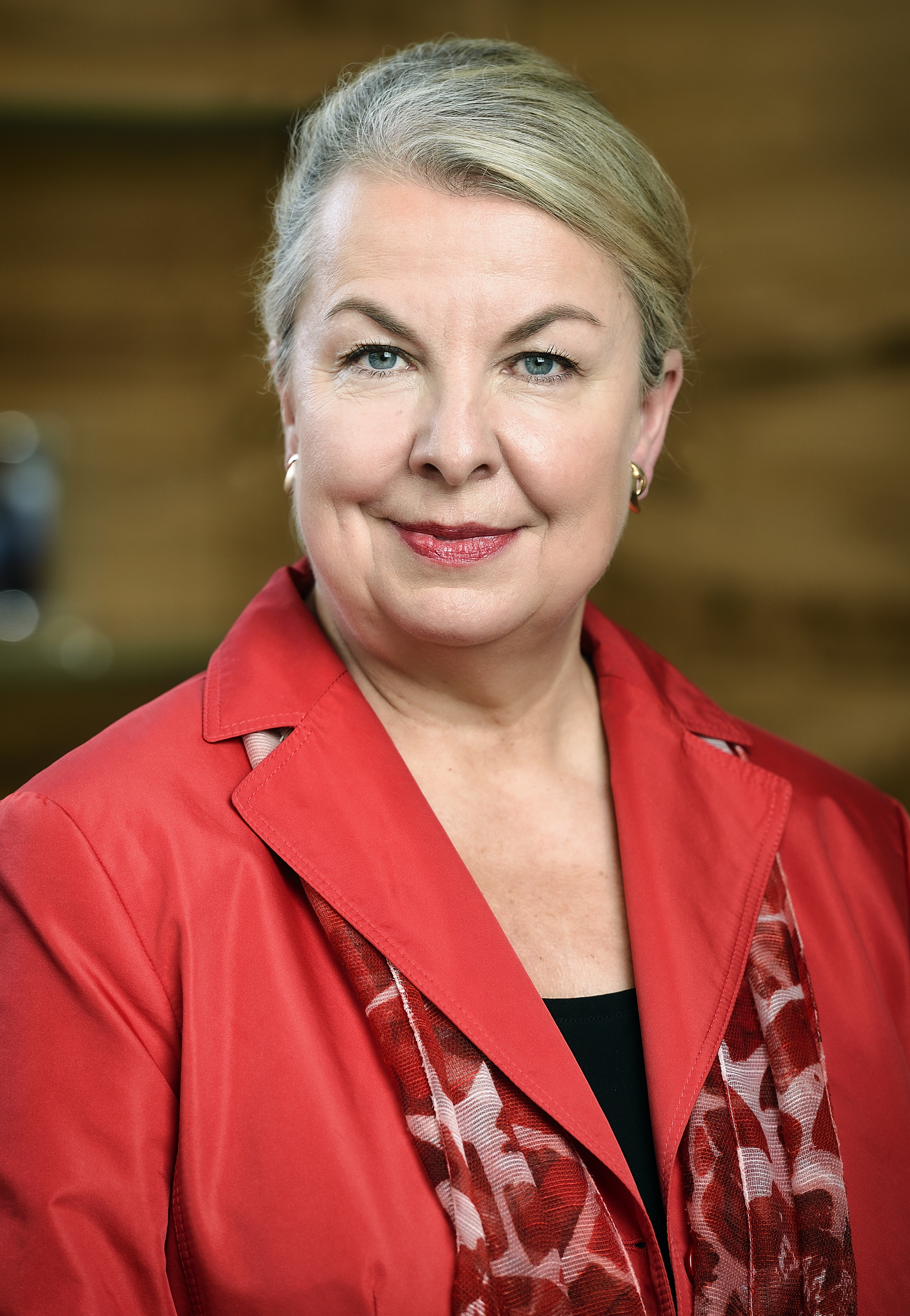

Minister of Social Affairs
- In office 18 December 2017 – 22 May 2019
- Chancellor: Sebastian Kurz
- Preceded by: Alois Stöger (Labour, Social Affairs and Consumer Protection); Pamela Rendi-Wagner (Health and Women)
- Succeeded by: Walter Pöltner

Personal details
- Born: Beate Schnuderl; 9 September 1959 (age 67) Graz, Styria, Austria
- Party: Freedom Party
- Spouse: Andreas Klein
- Children: 2
- Education: University of Graz

Beate Hartinger-Klein (born Beate Schnuderl; 9 September 1959) is an Austrian healthcare and insurance manager, educator and politician. A member of the Freedom Party of Austria (FPÖ), she was a member of the National Council from October 1999 to December 2002. From December 2017 to May 2019, Hartinger-Klein served as minister of social affairs in the first government of Chancellor Sebastian Kurz.

== Life ==
Beate Hartinger-Klein, née Schnuderl, was born on 9 September 1959 in Graz.

She attended primary school from 1966 to 1970 and middle school from 1970 to 1974. She completed her secondary education at a commercial academy (German: Handelsakademie), a type of five-year high school similar to a gymnasium but with added business-oriented vocational training. After graduating from the academy, she studied social and economic science at the University of Graz, obtaining a master's degree in 1984.

From 1984 to 1985, Hartinger-Klein was employed as a case manager in a tax accountancy firm. In January 1986 she took on a management role with Kastner & Öhler, a then-major department store chain in the province of Styria, Austria. A few months later, in July 1987, she moved into the public healthcare and social insurance sector, starting as an internal auditor for Styria's public hospital operator. By 1990, she had risen to Head of Controlling.

Starting in August 2003, Hartinger-Klein served as the general manager of the Main Association of Austrian Social Security Institutions (German: Hauptverband der Sozialversicherungsträger), an umbrella organization supervising and representing all of Austria's public insurers. In 2005, she was promoted to deputy general secretary. Her responsibilities included managing the multitude of contractual relationships the Association maintained with physicians, pharmacies, and the pharmaceutical industry. She was also in charge of matters of employment law, job training, institutional self-governance, and the sector's international relationships.

On 1 April 2009 she became the general manager of healthcare consulting for Deloitte Austria. Hartinger-Klein and Deloitte quickly became "disenchanted" with each other, according to one acquaintance, due to pressure from high expectations and ill-defined responsibilities. In April 2011, Hartinger-Klein left Deloitte and established her own business advisory agency, the Hartinger-Klein Consulting GmbH.

She also lectured at the Vienna University of Economics and Business, the University of Vienna, the UAS Krems, the UAS St. Pölten, and her alma mater, the University of Graz.

Hartinger-Klein is re-married and a mother of two.

== Political career ==
Hartinger-Klein joined the Freedom Party in 1996. The same year, she was appointed to the board of the Styrian regional healthcare fund (Gesundsheitsfonds Steiermark). She successfully ran for a seat in the Styrian regional diet (Landtag) in 1995, serving from January 1996 to October 1999, and for a seat on the National Council in 1999, serving from October of that year to December 2002.

Disillusioned with Jörg Haider after the Knittelfeld putsch in September 2002, Hartinger-Klein left the party, and politics in general. She declined to stand for the November 2002 National Council elections. Her seat on the Styrian healthcare fund board expired in 2003. She later rejoined the Freedom Party, but not until 2013.

On 18 December 2017 she was appointed to lead the Ministry of Labor, Social Affairs and Consumer Protection as well as the Ministry of Health and Women's Affairs as a member of the first Kurz government. Her dual role was due to the fact that the government was planning to merge the two ministries. These plans having been implemented, Hartinger-Klein was appointed minister of labor, social affairs, health and consumer protection on 8 January 2018.

== Controversies ==
=== Unusual relationship with pharmaceutical lobbyist and managers, accelerating drug expense increase 2005 - 2008 ===
In October 2008, the Austrian business magazine "trend." reported Hartinger's unusual relationship with a lobbyist and pharmaceutical industry representatives, suggesting leading to a detrimental side-effect for the general public.

In her years as top manager at the central helm of the Austrian social insurances, she repeatedly arranged meetings of health care decision makers including physicians and pharmaceutical managers (around 15 persons) in her private home in Vienna. The invitations were arranged, attractively packed and sent out, by "the No. 1" among the pharmaceutical lobbyists of Austria, who was also present. During the very period, an extraordinary increase in the public expenses for drugs happened.

For drugs, public costs rose within four years by 21%. In 2003 the 1.95 Billion, rose in 2007 to 2,35 Billion, equalling an additional expense of 400 million euros. However the annual inflation was flat at 2% at those times in Austria. Particularly steep and accelerating was the expense increase in 2006 and 2007 (6%, and 8%, resulting in 14% for two years).

In December 2007 the Austrian parliament had tried to rein in, and legislated a cost ceiling of a maximum of 2% above inflation ( = 4%) for the coming years. Despite that, the costs continued to increase steeply, in first 7 months of 2008 9% alone.

2009 Hartinger-Kleins's contract at the helm of the social insurances was not prolonged.

=== Smoking bans ===
At the time the first Kurz government took office, Austria had enacted but not yet implemented a general smoking ban in bars and restaurants. The smoking ban had been passed in 2015 and was meant to go into full effect in May 2018. Heinz-Christian Strache, the populist Freedom Party leader and newly minted vice chancellor, opposed the ban. He demanded and eventually won the People's Party support in overturning the law. Hartinger-Klein initially stated that she was "not happy" about the development but would grudgingly support it out of respect for democracy. She later amended her position and declared herself opposed to smoking bans as a matter of principle. It was wrong, she asserted in a debate in the National Council, to forbid hosts from being hospitable, and unhelpful to subject minority rights to majority decisions. Commentators, including right-of-center editorialists sympathetic to the cabinet as a whole, ridiculed her change of mind. Hartinger-Klein's surprise about-face had come well after Strache's initiative had turned out to be broadly unpopular.

=== Social insurance reform ===
The first Kurz government planned a comprehensive reform of Austria's healthcare system. The government's primary target is the Austrian Social Insurance for Occupational Risks (Allgemeine Unfallversicherungsanstalt or AUVA), an arm of Austria's system of social insurance that insures workers, students, and small business owners against workplace accidents and occupational disease. The government's official agenda demands that the AUVA cut its yearly spending by EUR 500 million. The cuts are alleged to be necessary to compensate for a planned reduction in insurance premiums: companies currently have to contribute 1.3 percent of each worker's salary to the AUVA; the government intends to decrease these payments to 0.8 percent. The cabinet expects the AUVA to draw up appropriate measures by the end of the year and threatens to dissolve the institution should it fail to comply, distributing its responsibilities across other public insurers.

The opposition and the medical establishment are harshly critical of the ultimatum.

Thomas Szekeres, the head of the Medical Council (Ärztekammer), the state medical board of registration and professional association of Austrian physicians, has condemned Hartinger-Klein's hard line. According to Szekeres, Austrian trauma care and rehabilitation facilities are "excellent" and the AUVA is an "indispensable" part of the system. Employees of the Lorenz Böhler hospital in Vienna convened a protest meeting registering their opposition to Hartinger-Klein.

Opposition politicians such as Josef Muchitsch, an employees' representative and member of parliament for the Social Democratic Party, have accused Hartinger-Klein of being biased against the AUVA. In 2015, Hartinger-Klein had applied for the position of director general of the AUVA but had lost out to another candidate. Hartinger-Klein alleged gender discrimination and complained to the relevant equal opportunities committee. When the committee did not find in her favor, she filed suit, losing first the original trial and then two appeals. Her final appeal to the Supreme Court was still pending when she was appointed Minister of Health, although she did subsequently drop the case in January 2018. Max Lercher, General Secretary of the Social Democratic Party, described Hartinger-Klein's attacks on the AUVA as a "war" and a "personal vendetta".

== Personal beliefs ==
Hartinger-Klein is not considered an ideological hardliner. In a 2018 interview, she claimed to have only joined the party in order to be able to accept a position as a speaker on social affairs in the Styrian diet, a job she felt compelled to take out of a sense of social responsibility. She in fact left the party for nearly eleven years between 2002 and 2013. Her political affiliation does not reflect family background. Her father identified as a conservative − an unusual and conspicuous posture for an Austrian railway worker at the time − and her mother was a Social Democrat.

On her official ministry web page and in her official CV, Hartinger-Klein professes to be a member of the Austrian Evangelical Church, a mainstream but minority congregation in Catholic-dominated Austria. Austrian politicians are not usually expected to stress their congregational affiliations in this way. Hartinger-Klein's husband, Andreas Klein, is an Evangelical theologist, ethicist, lecturer with the University of Vienna, and ethics consultant.
