= Walter Pöltner =

Austrian politician

Minister of Social Affairs
- In office 22 May 2019 – 3 June 2019
- Chancellor: Sebastian Kurz
- Preceded by: Beate Hartinger-Klein
- Succeeded by: Brigitte Zarfl

Personal details
- Born: 29 February 1952 (age 73); Vienna, Austria

Walter Pöltner (born 29 February 1952) is an Austrian jurist who formerly served as the designated Minister of Social Affairs.
