= Mückstein =

Mückstein is a surname, likely of Austrian origin. Notable people with the surname include:

- Katharina Mückstein (born 1982), Austrian film director, screenwriter, and producer
- Wolfgang Mückstein (born 1974), Austrian physician and politician
