= Rudolf Anschober =

Austrian politician

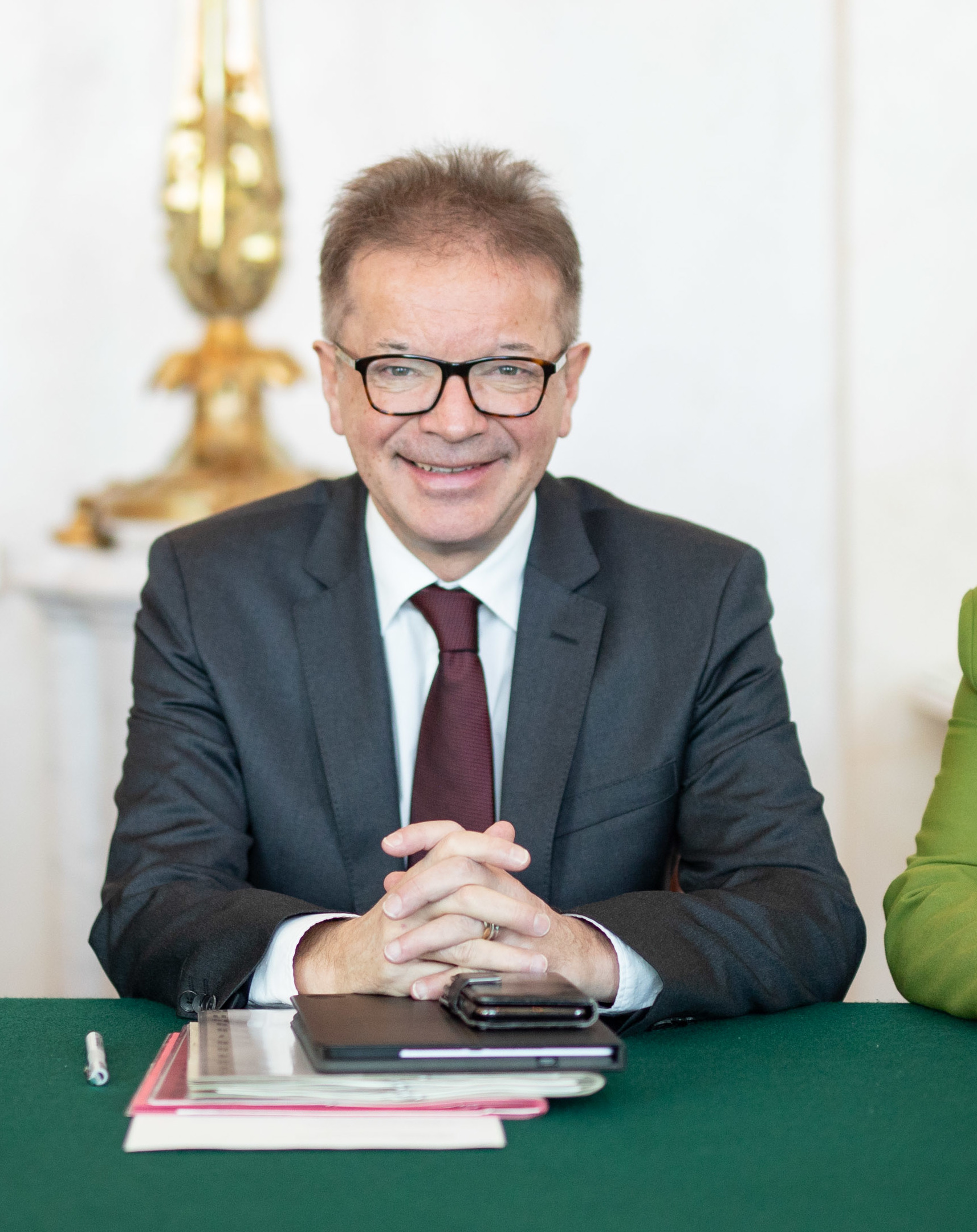
- Anschober in 2020

Minister of Social Affairs, Health, Care and Consumer Protection
- In office 7 January 2020 – 13 April 2021
- Chancellor: Sebastian Kurz
- Preceded by: Brigitte Zarfl
- Succeeded by: Wolfgang Mückstein

Personal details
- Born: 21 November 1960 (age 65) Wels, Upper Austria, Austria
- Party: The Greens – The Green Alternative
- Website: www.anschober.at

Rudolf Anschober (born 21 November 1960) is an Austrian politician of the Green Party who served as Minister of Social Affairs, Health, Care, and Consumer Protection in the second government of Chancellor Sebastian Kurz from January 2020 to April 2021.

== Political career ==
A former journalist and schoolteacher, Anschober served as a member of the National Council from 1990 until 1997. On 23 October 2003, he became part of the Upper Austrian state government. He was the only councillor in the Upper Austrian government to represent the Greens for 9 years, from the time he was elected until 2012. In September 2012, he took a brief break as councillor to be on sick leave for three months because of burnout. In the government, he was a councillor representing flood protection and energy policy until he left in 2012. In 2015, he took on the responsibilities of integration and accommodation of refugees instead when rejoining the government.

Throughout his tenure in the federal government, Anschober worked on the government's response to the COVID-19 pandemic in Austria. He consistently called for stricter lockdown measures in the face of high infection numbers, clashing with Chancellor Kurz and his party. By April 2021, he was diagnosed as suffering from high blood pressure, high blood sugar and early-stage tinnitus, which led him to resign from his office, effective 19 April 2021. At the time of his resignation, he was one of the country's most popular politicians. He started writing a political novel upon leaving.

== Personal life ==
His partner is Petra Ramsauer, a political scientist and author. They live in Vienna in an apartment. He previously lived in Steyregg when he worked in the Upper Austrian government.

== Other activities ==
- Fonds Gesundes Österreich, Chair of the Board of Trustees (since 2020)
- National Fund of the Republic of Austria for Victims of National Socialism, Member of the Board of Trustees (2020)

== Bibliography ==
=== Books ===
- Anschober, Rudi (April 11, 2022). Pandemia (1st ed.). Zsolnay, Paul. ISBN 978-3-552-07288-6.
