= Brigitte Zarfl =

Austrian civil servant (born 1962)

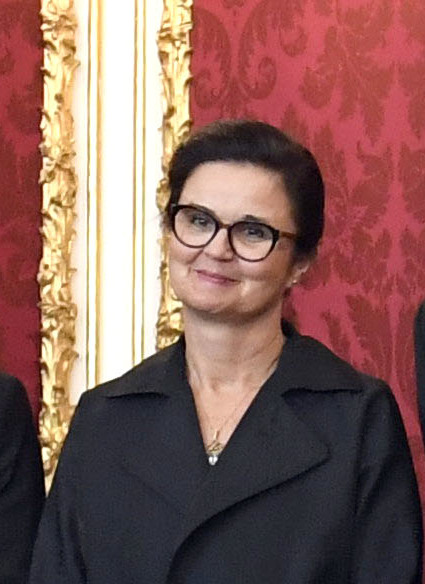
- Brigitte Zarfl in 2019

Minister for Labour, Social Affairs, Health and Consumer Protection
- In office 3 June 2019 – 7 January 2020
- Chancellor: Brigitte Bierlein
- Preceded by: Walter Pöltner
- Succeeded by: Rudolf Anschober

Personal details
- Born: 11 August 1962 (age 64) Krems an der Donau, Lower Austria, Austria

Brigitte Zarfl (born 11 August 1962) is an Austrian civil servant. She served as Minister for Labour, Social Affairs, Health and Consumer Protection in the Bierlein government.

Zarfl was born in Krems an der Donau in 1962. She studied nutritional science and food technology at the University of Vienna, completing a doctorate in 1996. She joined the social affairs ministry in 1997 under Eleonora Hostasch. She briefly became a delegate to the European Union in 2004 before returning to a role in the ministry in 2006, where she held various leadership roles until her appointment to Brigitte Bierlein's interim cabinet.
