= Elisabeth Sickl =

Austrian politician (born 1940)

Elisabeth Sickl (born 13 January 1940) is an Austrian retired politician.

Sickl was born in Vienna, where she also went to school. She studied law at the University of Vienna, completing the doctorate in 1966. She got qualified as a teacher and taught at, and from 1989 was director of, a school in Feldkirchen in Kärnten.

She was appointed by the Freedom Party of Austria (FPÖ) to the state government of Carinthia. In 1999 she was elected into the presidency of the Carinthian Landtag. Sickl was Minister for Social Security and Generations in the first government of Wolfgang Schüssel, succeeding Lore Hostasch in February 2000. On 24 October of the same year she was replaced by Herbert Haupt. She had been harshly criticised by the opposition and her own party for perceived incompetence and miscommunication.

After leaving politics, Sickl retired to Schloss Albeck, which she had purchased in 1987 and restored. Her son Heinrich Sickl is also an FPÖ politician and is reportedly associated with far-right groups including the Identitarian movement.
