= Johannes Rauch =

Austrian politician

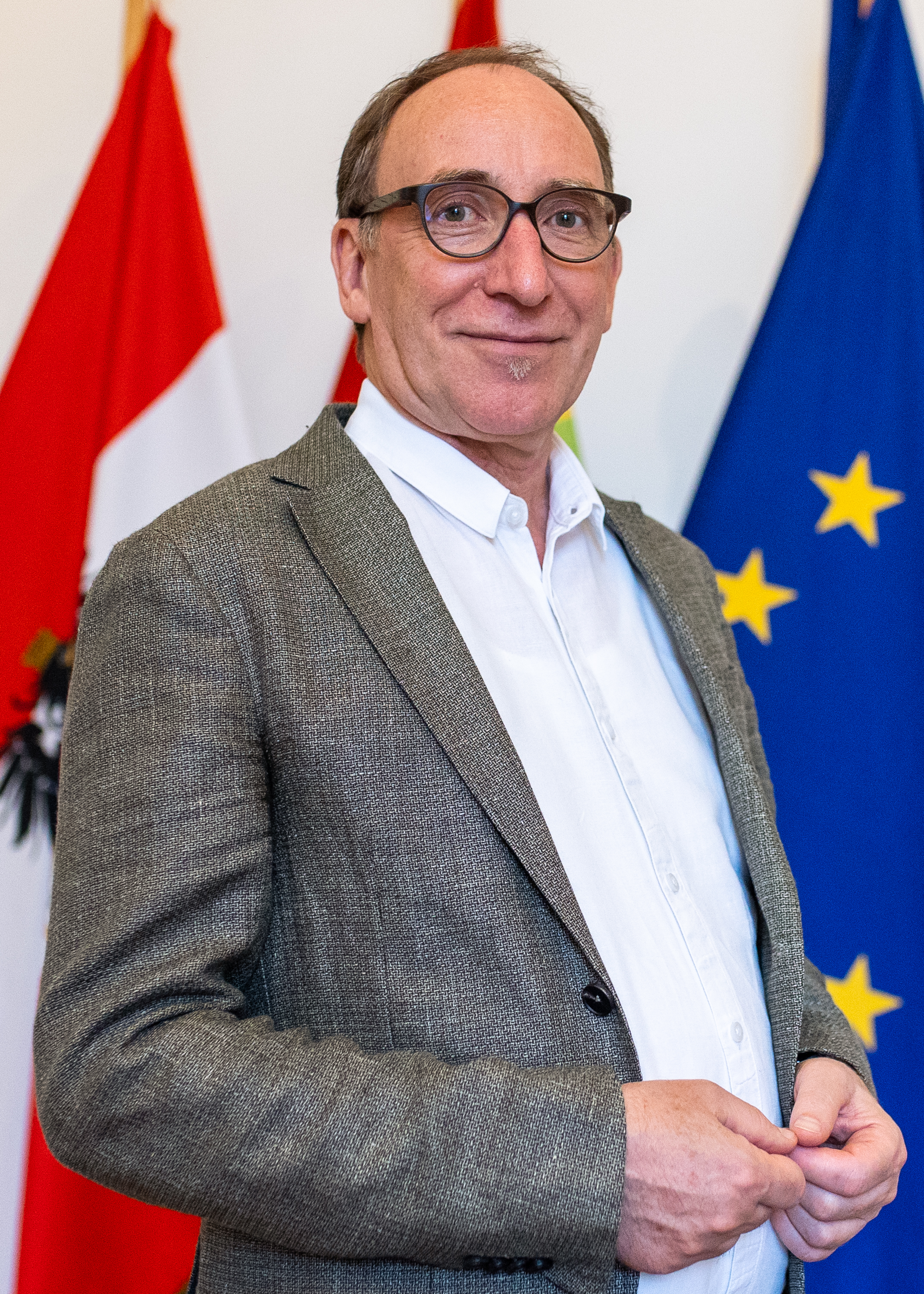
- Rauch in 2023

Minister of Social Affairs, Health, Care and Consumer Protection
- In office 8 March 2022 – 3 March 2025
- Chancellor: Karl Nehammer
- Preceded by: Wolfgang Mückstein
- Succeeded by: Korinna Schumann

Personal details
- Born: 24 April 1959 (age 67) Rankweil
- Party: The Greens – The Green Alternative

Johannes Rauch (German: [joˈhanεs ʁaʊx]; born 24 April 1959) is an Austrian politician (Green Party) who served as Federal Minister of Social Affairs, Health, Care and Consumer Protection in the government of chancellor Karl Nehammer from 8 March 2022 to 3 March 2025. Before taking office as Federal Minister, he was Provincial Councillor for the Environment and Mobility in the Vorarlberg State Government.

In October 2023 Rauch stated that his political career will end with his current position, but not his political engagement.

Rauch is sceptical of the FPÖ.

== See also ==
- Council of European Municipalities and Regions (CEMR)
- Next Austrian legislative election to elect the 28th National Council

Political offices
Preceded by Wolfgang Mückstein	Minister of Social Affairs, Health, Care and Consumer Protection; 2022–2025	Succeeded by Korinna Schumann
Incumbent
