= Minister (Austria) =

Member of the Austrian National Cabinet

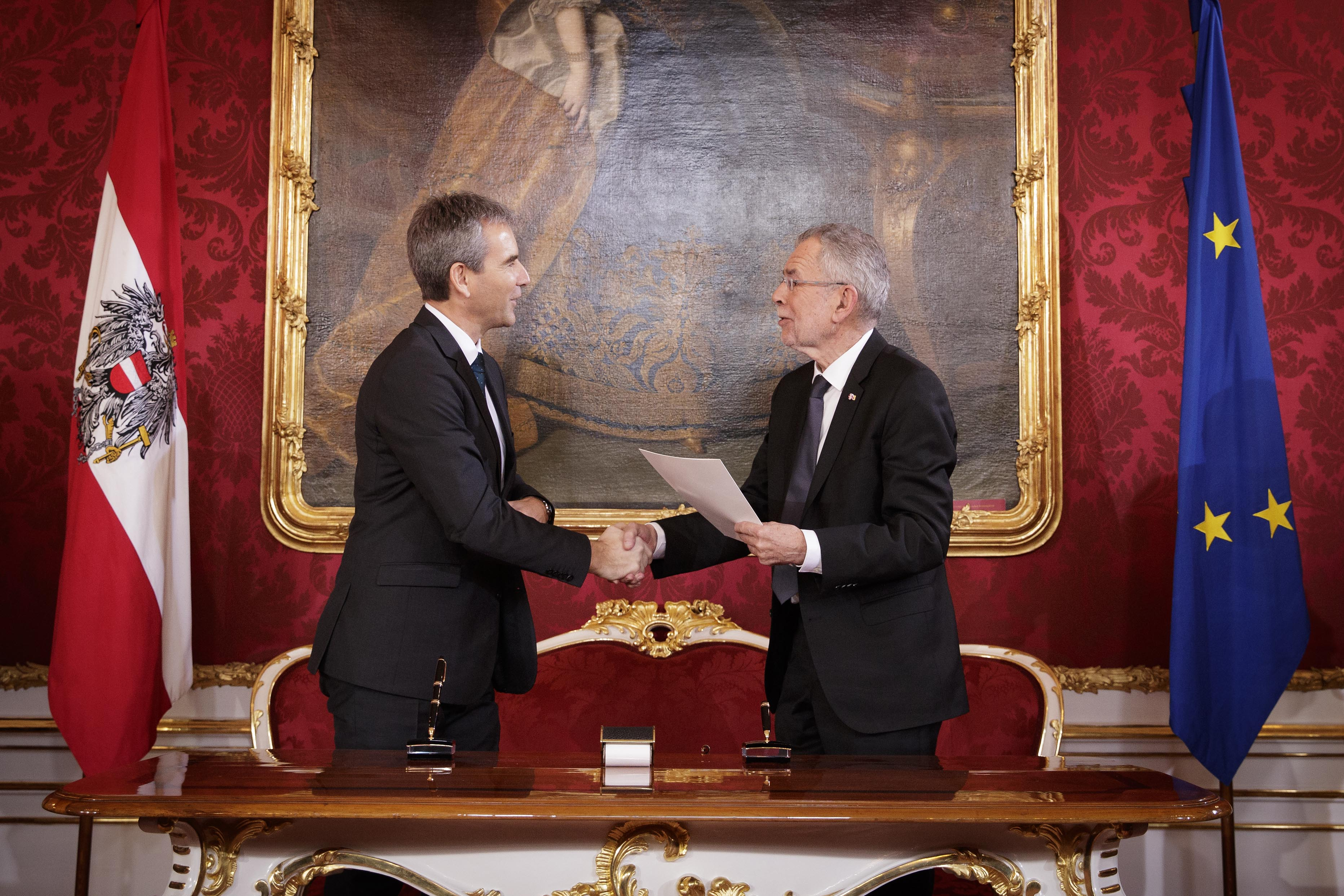
President Alexander Van der Bellen swearing in Hartwig Löger, minister of finance in the First Kurz government

In Austria, a minister (German: Bundesminister, lit. 'federal minister') is a member of the Cabinet that usually leads a ministry or a division of the Chancellery.

Most ministers are responsible for a specific area of public administration. Ministers without portfolio exist and used to be common under the First Austrian Republic but are rare today. A minister is the supreme executive organ within their area of responsibility. Ministers do not report to the either the president or the chancellor. Their decisions are subject to judicial review but cannot be overruled by any other part of the executive branch.

== Terminology ==
The Federal Constitutional Law, the centerpiece of the Austrian Constitution, states that "the Cabinet consists of the chancellor, the vice chancellor, and the other ministers".

Legally, the terms "minister" and "member of Cabinet" are interchangeable. However, the general public usually does not think of the chancellor and the vice chancellor as ministers. In the press and colloquial language, the chancellor and vice chancellor are almost always referred to by their specific titles. Additionally, the state secretaries are sometimes referred to as members of the Cabinet.

== Powers and responsibilities ==
=== Administration ===
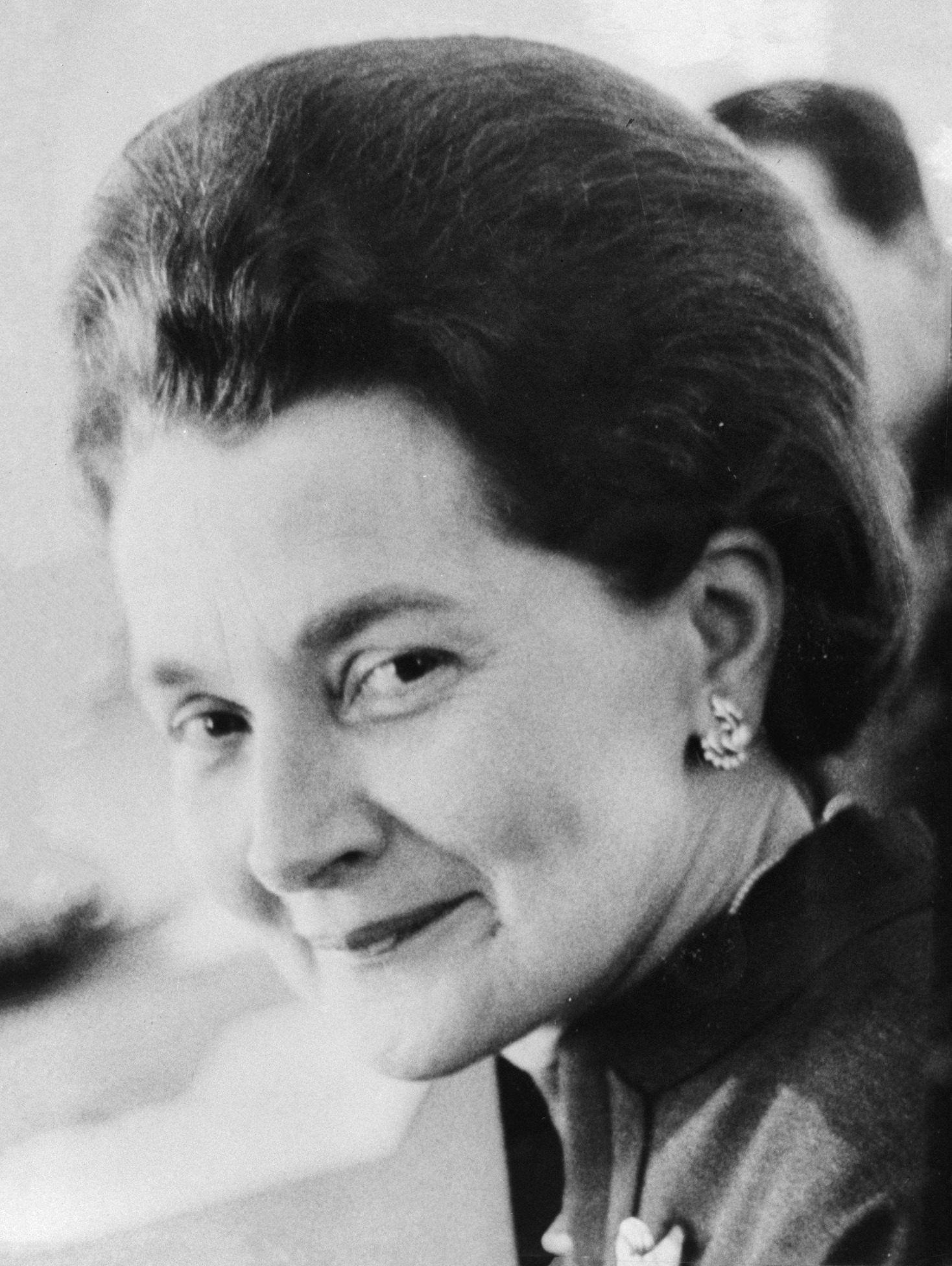
Grete Rehor was Austria's first female minister, leading the Ministry of Social Affairs from 1966 to 1970

Generally speaking, a minister is responsible for a specific topic area of public administration. The minister of the interior is responsible for public safety and for the correct conduct of elections and plebiscites; the minister of finance is responsible for tax collection, the preparation of budgets, and for certain aspects of economic policy; the minister of education runs the public school system; the minister of justice provides administrative assistance and facilities management for the judiciary; and so on. The minister is assisted by a department usually, although not always, called a ministry (German: Bundesministerium, lit. 'federal ministry').

Ministers can be given control of more than one ministry. Within their area of responsibility, the minister is the supreme executive organ. The minister is vested with managerial authority (Leitungsgewalt), meaning the minister is in charge of making policy, of making most personnel decisions, and of internal governance and discipline. They also bear operational authority (Weisungsgewalt), the power to issue instructions (Weisungen). Both powers follow from the postulate that supreme executive organs hold ultimate responsibility; a government officer cannot be considered responsible for what they cannot effectively control. However, some subdivisions of a ministry are independent (weisungsfrei), they are subject to managerial authority but not operational authority.

=== Delegated presidential powers ===
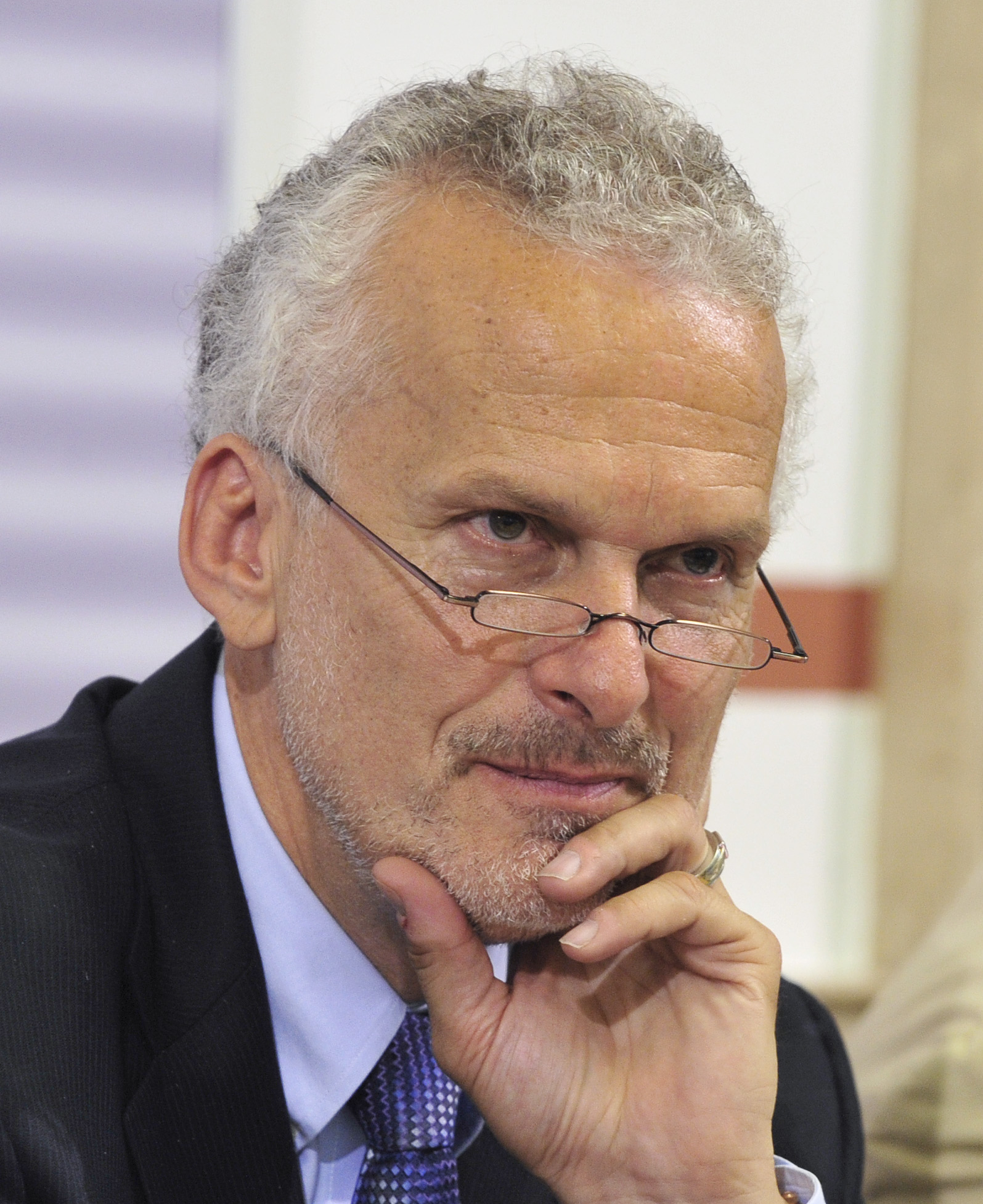
Minister of Justice Josef Moser is in charge of appointing Austria's judges in the president's stead

An important part of the responsibilities of most ministers is personnel decisions. Austria distinguishes between two basic types of public servants; contractual employees (Vertragsbedienstete) are regular workers subject to labor law and functionaries (Beamte) are career civil servants with an effective lifetime appointment. A functionary can only be terminated for cause and enjoys sound protection from unfavorable transfers and reassignments. The collective of functionaries, known as the Beamtenstand, includes judges, prosecutors, military officers, police officers, professors at public universities, and all senior administrators. In the past, it also used to include most other government workers, from local taxative clerks to school teachers.

Officially, all federal functionaries must be appointed by the president. However, the constitution allows the president to delegate this task. Justices of the Constitutional Court and the Supreme Administrative Court have to be appointed directly by the president, but appointments to general courts, for example, can be delegated to the minister of justice. With the exception of apex court judges, principals of public secondary schools, and a few handfuls of top-level ministerial officers, prosecutors, and army brass, functionaries are usually appointed by ministers.

Another power the president can and does delegate to ministers is the right to sign international treaties.

=== Council of Ministers ===
While every minister is a one-person supreme executive organ within their designated topic area, there are several types of decisions with respect to which the supreme executive organ is the cabinet as a whole. Exercising the powers vested in the cabinet requires a formal resolution passed in a formal plenary session; the quorum is a simple majority. Informally, the body of ministers meeting to exercise the collective responsibilities of the cabinet is often called the Council of Ministers (Ministerrat). The term is colloquial; it does not appear in the constitution.

== Eligibility ==
Prospective ministers must be eligible for election to the National Council. This means they need to be Austrian citizens, at least 18 years of age, and cannot have lost the right to stand as a candidate as a result of a criminal conviction. Generally speaking, Austria does not strip convicts of either the right to vote or the right to run, but criminal courts may pronounce a defendant temporarily disqualified if the defendant

- has been sentenced to a jail term of at least one year for treason, espionage, terrorism, war crimes, or crimes against humanity, for an attempt to undermine national security, for attempting to blackmail or intimidate justices, legislators, or senior administrators, for attempting to compromise an election or a plebiscite, or for attempting to undermine Austria's neutrality or Austria's foreign relations;
- has been sentenced to a jail term of at least five years for some other premeditated act.

Parts of the sentence suspended for probation do not count. The disqualification is lifted once the sentence has been served.

Ministers are subject to incompatibility rules. The president, a justice of the Constitutional Court, Supreme Administrative Court, or Supreme Court of Justice cannot serve as a minister; neither can the president of the Court of Auditors. There are no rules against members of Parliament being ministers.

Ministers cannot hold for-profit, private sector employment, although they may be exempt from this rule by the National Council's Incompatibility Committee (Unvereinbarkeitsausschuss) if the committee is satisfied there is no conflict of interest. Ministers may hold honorary positions but have to report them to the committee. Ministers may hold stakes in for-profit companies, but any such stakes have to be reported as well. If a minister and their spouse jointly control more than 25% of a corporation, that corporation is automatically excluded from public procurement.

== Appointment ==
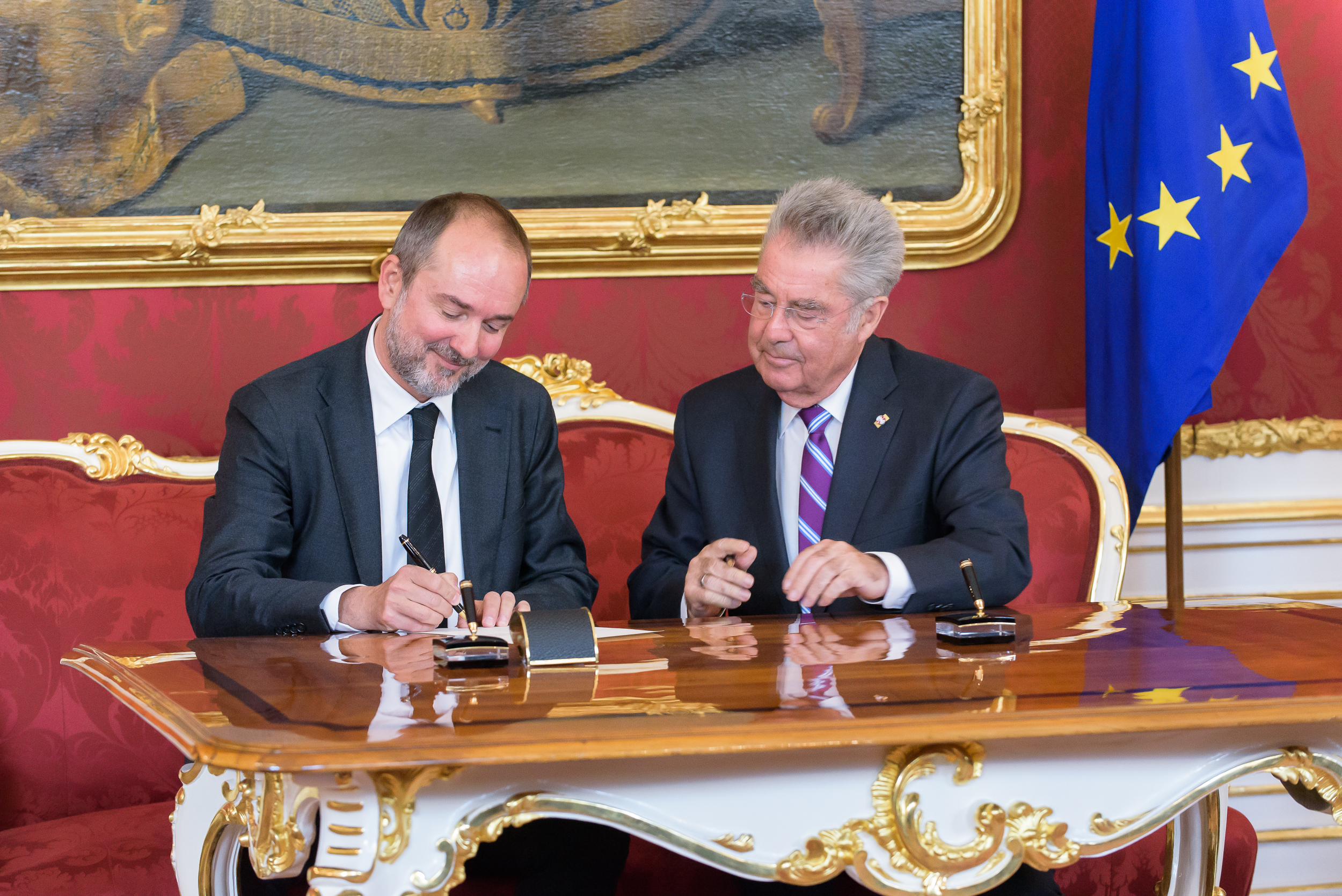
Thomas Drozda being appointed minister by President Heinz Fischer, a former minister himself

Ministers are appointed by the president. The chancellor is appointed by the president unilaterally; ministers other than the chancellor are appointed on nomination by the chancellor. In theory, the president can also dismiss ministers: the chancellor can be removed unilaterally; individual ministers other than the chancellor can only be removed on request by the chancellor. The president can also remove, again unilaterally, the entire cabinet at once. In practice, the president does not forcibly dismiss either ministers or cabinets; they resign.

The fact that the cabinet is installed by the president, who is elected directly by the people, and not by parliament is one of the features of the Austrian constitution that impart a semi-presidential appearance to the country. The appearance is superficial; as a matter of political reality, Austria is a parliamentary republic. The main reason is that ministers are politically answerable not only to the president but to the legislature as well. The president is required to dismiss any minister the National Council censures with a motion of no confidence. The National Council can also order to president to dismiss the entire cabinet. As a result, the president is more or less forced to appoint as chancellor whichever majority leader the legislature preselects.

Austrian presidents gladly accept that their role is that of figureheads. The last time an Austrian president rebuked a parliamentary majority leader was in the context of the installation of the first Schüssel government in 1999; President Thomas Klestil first preemptively announced he would refuse to appoint Jörg Haider, then in fact refused Chancellor Wolfgang Schüssel's request to appoint Hilmar Kabas and Thomas Prinzhorn. Even so, motions of no confidence are extremely common; they just never pass. Between 1945 and 2005, opposition parties have submitted no fewer 175 unsuccessful motions of no confidence in order to focus attention and create headlines. There were 65 motions of no confidence in the ten years from 2006 to 2016, i.e. more than six per year. As of 2017, motions of no confidence have been introduced against members of every single cabinet in the history of the Second Austrian Republic.

Unable to govern effectively without active majority support in the legislature, and in fact unable to stay in office without at least its tacit toleration, the cabinet derives not just its actual authority but also its abstract political legitimacy from the National Council. It is thus customary for the cabinet to resign not just when the ruling coalition breaks down but also whenever a new National Council is elected. The constitution requires the president to put caretaker ministers in charge of the positions being vacated ("mit der Fortführung der Verwaltung ... betrauen") to prevent disruption of daily operational management of the bureaucracy. In theory, the president could appoint selected departing ministers, state secretaries, or senior civil servants. In practice, the president simply offers to reappoint each departing minister to the office, the ministers accept; the caretaker government is identical to the conventional government preceding it.

== Impeachment ==
In addition to being politically answerable to the president and the legislature, ministers are also legally liable for any misconduct in office. The constitution stipulates that Austria is run according to the principle of the rule of law (Gesetzmäßigkeit der Verwaltung). Among other things, this means that it is illegal for ministers to try to exercise powers not explicitly vested in them by statute.

Ministers accused of not just political malpractice but of culpable violations of actual law can be impeached before the Constitutional Court. If the court finds the minister guilty, the minister is removed from office. In certain minor cases, the Court can limit itself to merely noting the violation. In extreme cases, the court can strip the defendant of their political rights, although only for a limited term; this would prevent the defendant from holding either a ministry or any other political office for a while.

== Special cases ==
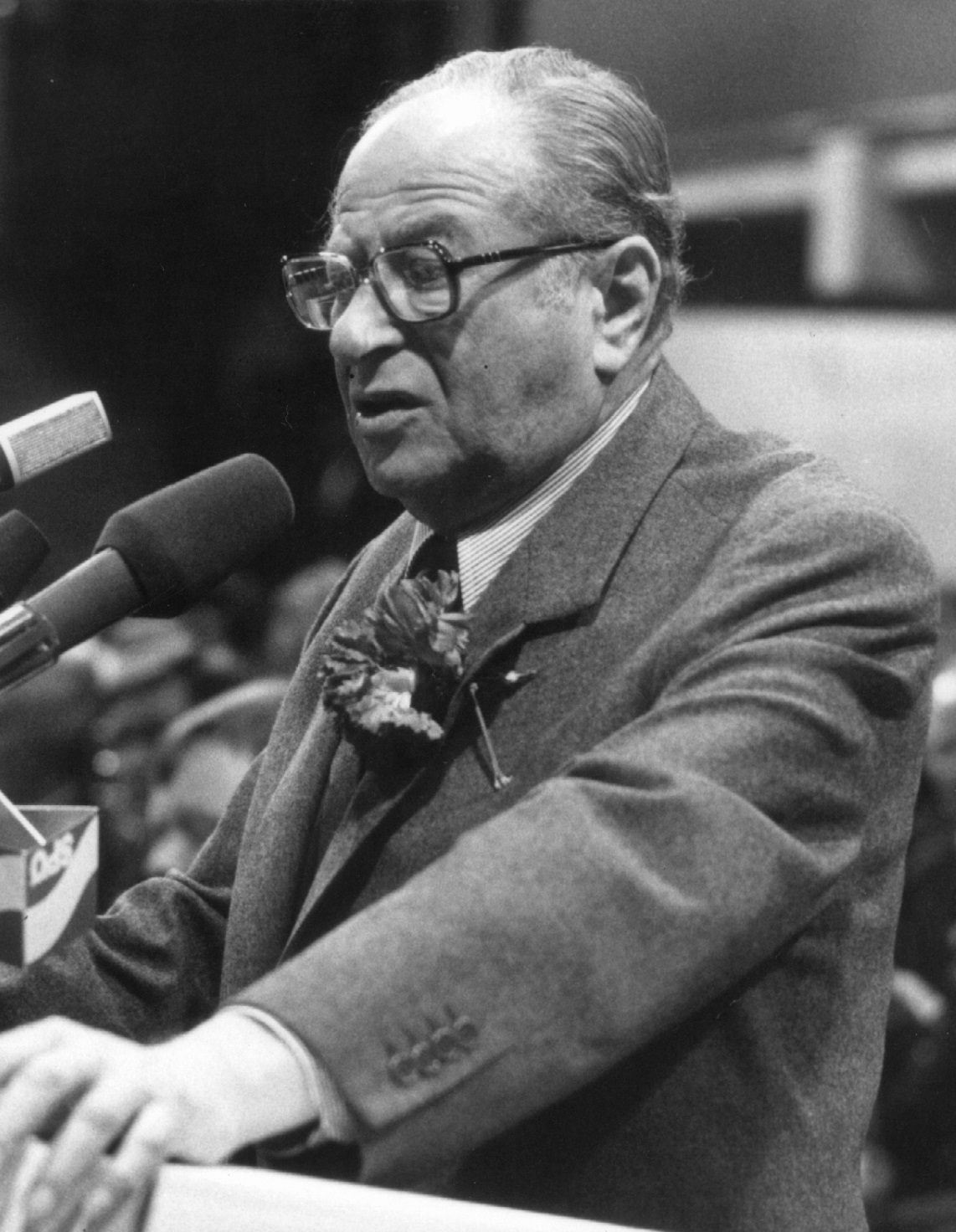
Bruno Kreisky was a minister for almost twenty years, thirteen of them as the chancellor

=== Chancellor ===
The chancellor is the head of government and is set apart from other ministers in several ways:

- The chancellor chairs the sessions of the cabinet.
- The chancellor is the first minister of any new cabinet to be appointed and represents the cabinet vis-a-vis the president. Ministers other than the chancellor can only be appointed on nomination by the chancellor. The president also needs the chancellor's active cooperation to remove a minister other than the chancellor.
- The chancellor directs the promulgation of parliamentary resolutions, particularly statutes, and of verdicts of the Constitutional Court abrogating statutes. The chancellor is the officer who formally presents bills to be signed into law to the president, and the president's signature only becomes effective with the chancellor's countersignature.
- If the president is unable to discharge the powers and duties of their office, the chancellor takes over as acting president for a period of up to twenty days.

One power the chancellor notably does not have is Richtlinienkompetenz, the power to issue directives or policy guidelines to other ministers. On paper, this means that the chancellor is a mere primus inter pares. In reality, the chancellor's triple role as chairperson of the cabinet, de facto coadjutor of the president, and de facto parliamentary majority leader makes him or her the most powerful person in Austrian politics by a comfortable margin.

The ministry the chancellor leads is the Chancellery, the only ministry the constitution actually guarantees to exist.

=== Vice chancellor ===
The vice chancellor stands in for the chancellor whenever the chancellor is unavailable. No special resolution or proclamation is necessary for the vice chancellor to become acting chancellor; the vice chancellor simply takes charge wherever expediency requires. If a cabinet session has been scheduled and the chancellor is unable to attend, for instance, the vice chancellor is permitted, and in fact expected, to chair the meeting in the chancellor's stead.

In a coalition government, the vice chancellor is usually the leader of the junior coalition party. Ministers belonging to the vice chancellor's party will look to the vice chancellor, not the chancellor, for leadership. The result is that vice chancellors, like chancellors, are more influential in reality than a literal reading of the constitution would suggest.

The constitution permits the vice chancellor to be given, in addition to their ex officio role as the deputy head of the Chancellery, a ministry of their own; alternatively, the vice chancellor can be given full autonomous control of a specific Chancellery subdepartment. Since the duties of a vice chancellor by themselves are not particularly taxing, vice chancellors are generally happy to avail themselves of the opportunity. Heinz-Christian Strache for example, vice chancellor in the First Kurz government, doubles as the Chancellery minister of Civil Service and Sports.

=== Ministers without portfolio ===
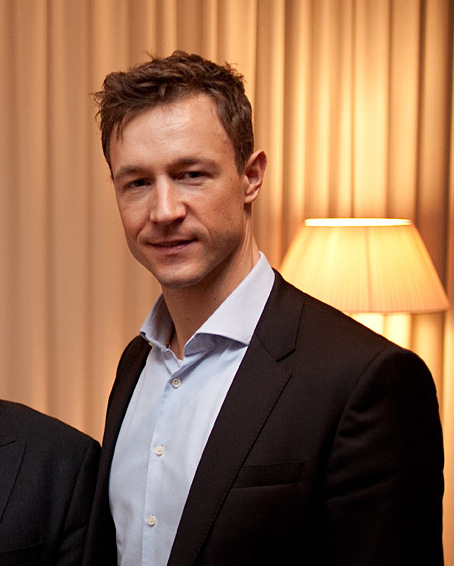
Gernot Blümel, a minister without portfolio and later Chancellery minister in the First Kurz government

The constitution does not require that every minister be put in charge of a ministry; president and chancellor are free to install ministers without portfolio.

Ministers without portfolio are not a regular occurrence today, but the option is occasionally useful because most Austrian governments are coalition governments; there has not been a single-party cabinet since 1971. The size of a coalition government does not always depend on the number of available ministries alone. In many governments, the relative strengths of the two parties in the National Council call for a seat ratio in the cabinet that is difficult to approximate with the ministries at hand; a supernumerary minister or two can help reach the necessary compromise.

Another factor is that different parties cater to different constituencies and therefore demand different areas of responsibility, meaning that the division of responsibilities into portfolios (Ressortaufteilung) is highly political. As a consequence, responsibilities keep being shuffled around; ministries are created, dissolved, merged into others, or split in two – usually once per election cycle, sometimes twice or more. A minister designated to lead a ministry that does not yet exist can be made a minister without portfolio for the time being. A typical but notable example is Herta Firnberg, a member of the first Kreisky government. Kreisky had decided to create a Ministry of Women's Affairs. Since creating a new ministry requires a statute to be enacted and promulgated, several weeks would pass between Kreisky taking office and the ministry becoming available. The designated minister – Firnberg – was made a minister without portfolio for the duration of the transitional period.

=== Chancellery ministers ===
Instead of a ministry, ministers can also be put in charge of a section (Sektion) of the Chancellery, the ministry led by the chancellor. Ministers leading Chancellery sections are commonly called "ministers in the Chancellery" ("Minister im Kanzleramt") or "Chancellery ministers" ("Kanzleramtsminister") for short, although neither expression appears in the constitution. The difference between ministers leading ministries and ministers leading Chancellery sections is mostly aesthetic. One the one hand, being the head of a ministry is obviously more prestigious than being the head of merely part of one. A second factor is that Chancellery sections, unlike ministries, can be created or dissolved without involving the legislature and so tend to be naturally more ephemeral. As a result, Chancellery ministers can be considered politically junior to regular ministers. On the other hand, Chancellery ministers are supreme executive organs within their respective domains just like regular ministers.

Even though the chancellor can create Chancellery sections without having to wait for statutes to be passed and promulgated, the process can take time. As a result, Chancellery ministers too sometimes start their tenures in the cabinet as ministers without portfolio. As of September 2018, the most recent example is Gernot Blümel, minister of European affairs, the Art, Culture and the Media in the First Kurz government. Blümel was first sworn in as a minister without portfolio on December 18, 2017, then sworn in again as a Chancellery minister on January 8, 2018.
