= Central Association of Austrian Social Insurance Authorities =

- Hauptverband der österreichischen Sozialversicherungsträger
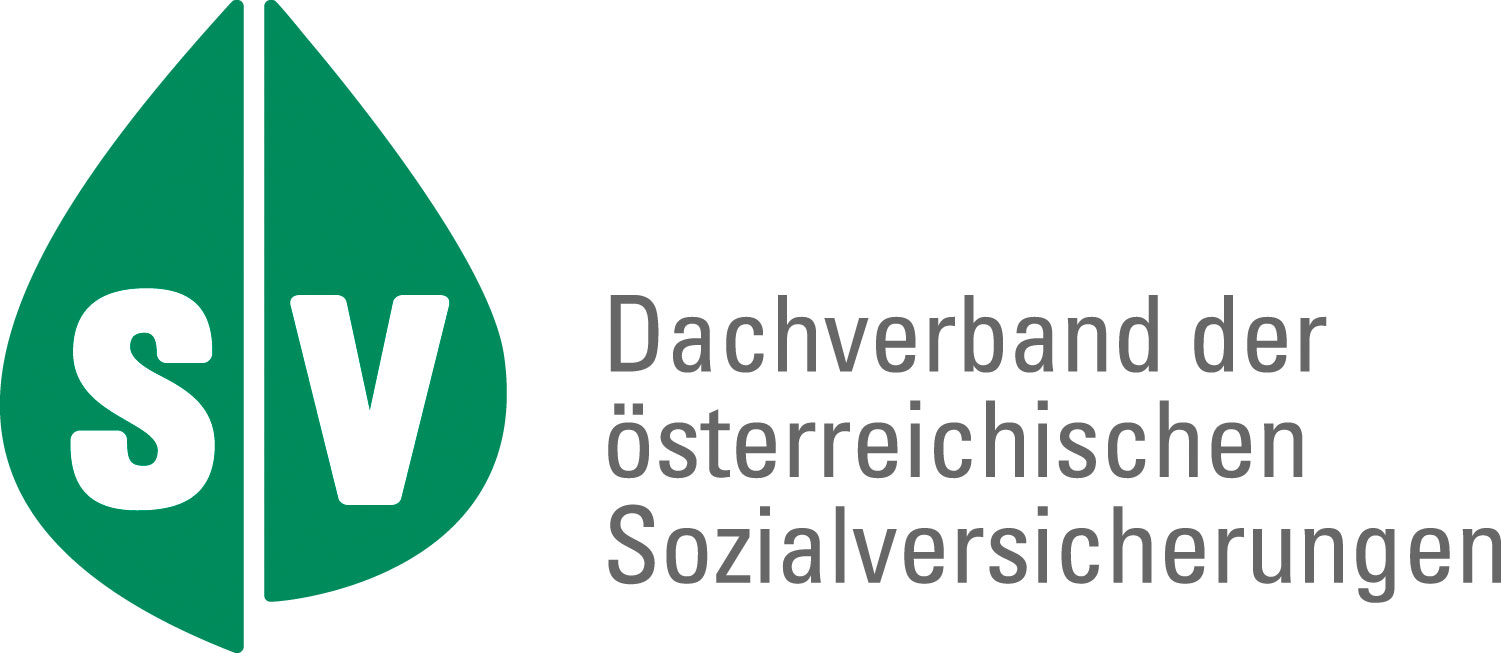

Agency overview
- Formed: 01/01/1948 as Hauptverband der Sozialversicherungsträger, later renamed Hauptverband der österreichischen Sozialversicherungsträger
- Dissolved: 01/01/2020
- Type: Public corporation
- Jurisdiction: Austria
- Headquarters: Vienna III., Kundmanngasse 21
- Parent agency: Federal Ministry of Social Affairs, Health, Care and Consumer Protection and Federal Ministry of Finance (Austria)
- Website: www.sozialversicherung.at

The Central Association of Austrian Social Insurance Authorities was established in 1948, called in German "Hauptverband der österreichischen Sozialversicherungsträger" over many years. It served as the umbrella organisation covering Austria’s health, accident and pension insurance. In a comprehensive reorganisation in 2019, by means of the Sozialversicherungs-Organisationsgesetz, the public corporation was renamed as Umbrella association of Social Insurances ( Dachverband der österreichischen Sozialversicherungsträger) from 1 January 2020 onwards and thoroughly restructured. Its legal entity, however, remained the same, which means that all existing contracts remain valid and in force for the time being.

== Organisation and independent administration ==
Austrian social insurance is based on the principle of independent self-administration. Independent administration means that the state transfers certain administrative tasks to those groups of persons that take a direct interest in them. Representatives of these groups then established administrative bodies whose tasks it is to manage the respective administrative areas without being subject to following directives from the state. The term of office of the administrative bodies of the Hauptverband was four years.

The self-administrating bodies of theHauptverband were the Conference of Insurance Institution (Trägerkonferenz) and the Board of the association (Verbandsvorstand):

=== Conference of Insurance Institutions ===
The Conference of Insurance Institutions was the legislative body of the central association and consisted of the chairpersons and the first deputies of the insurance institutions as well as three pensioners’ representatives. Thus the individual social insurance institutions were included in the independent administration of the central association. Its tasks were approving the annual budget, the annual report (consisting of the financial statements and the statistical evidence), the statute, the model statute, the model regulations of rights and duties of insured persons, and the model bylaws, guidelines, the objectives management for coordinating the administrative activities of the social insurance institutions as well as its mission statement.

=== Board of the association ===
The Board of the association consisted of twelve members appointed by the Conference of Insurance Institutions following suggestions of the employers’ and employees’ associations. Its tasks were to fulfill all tasks not explicitly assigned to the Conference of Insurance Institutions, and representing the central association externally.

The twelve members were assembled was follows:

- 6 employees’ representatives
  - 5 members were nominated by the Austrian Chamber of Labor from amongst the employees
  - 1 member was nominated by the public sector trade union (Gewerkschaft öffentlicher Dienst)
- 6 employers’ representatives
  - 5 members were nominated by the Austrian Chamber of Commerce from amongst the employers
  - 1 member was nominated by the presidential conference of the Austrian Chamber of Agriculture (Landwirtschaftskammer Österreich).

=== Chairpersons of the conference of the Central Association of Austrian Social Insurance Authorities ===
1949–1959: Johann Böhm
1959–1968: Friedrich Hillegeist
1968–1976: Gerhard Weißenberg
1976–1984: Franz Millendorfer
1984–1988: Adolf Czettel
1989–1990: Rudolf Sametz
1991–1997: Richard Leutner
1997–2001: Hans Sallmutter
2001–2005: Herwig Frad and Martin Gleitsmann (alternating every year)
2005–2009: Erich Laminger
2009–2014: Hans Jörg Schelling
2014–2015: Peter McDonald
2015–2017: Ulrike Rabmer-Koller
2017–2019: Alexander Biach

=== CEOs of the Central Association of Austrian Social Insurance Authorities ===
- 1 January 1948 to 30 November 1949: Johann Böhm as a provisional administrator, Reinhold Melas provisionally appointed to manage the operations
- 1 December 1949 to 31 December 1970: Reinhold Melas
- 1 January 1971 to 31 May 1989: Alois Dragaschnig
- 1 June 1989 to 31. March 1991: Karl-Heinz Wolff
- 1 April 1991 to 31 December 2001: Walter Geppert
- 1 January 2002 to 31 March 2013: Josef Kandlhofer (from 1 January 2002 to 31 March 2005 as “Speaker of the Management”, from 1 January 2005 subject to following directives from the Verwaltungsrat), then, as a manager, member of the Verbandsmanagement, subject to following directives from the Verbandsvorstand (§ 441g ASVG)
- 1 April 2013 to 31 December 2019: Josef Probst
