= Eleonora Hostasch =

Austrian politician and trade union leader

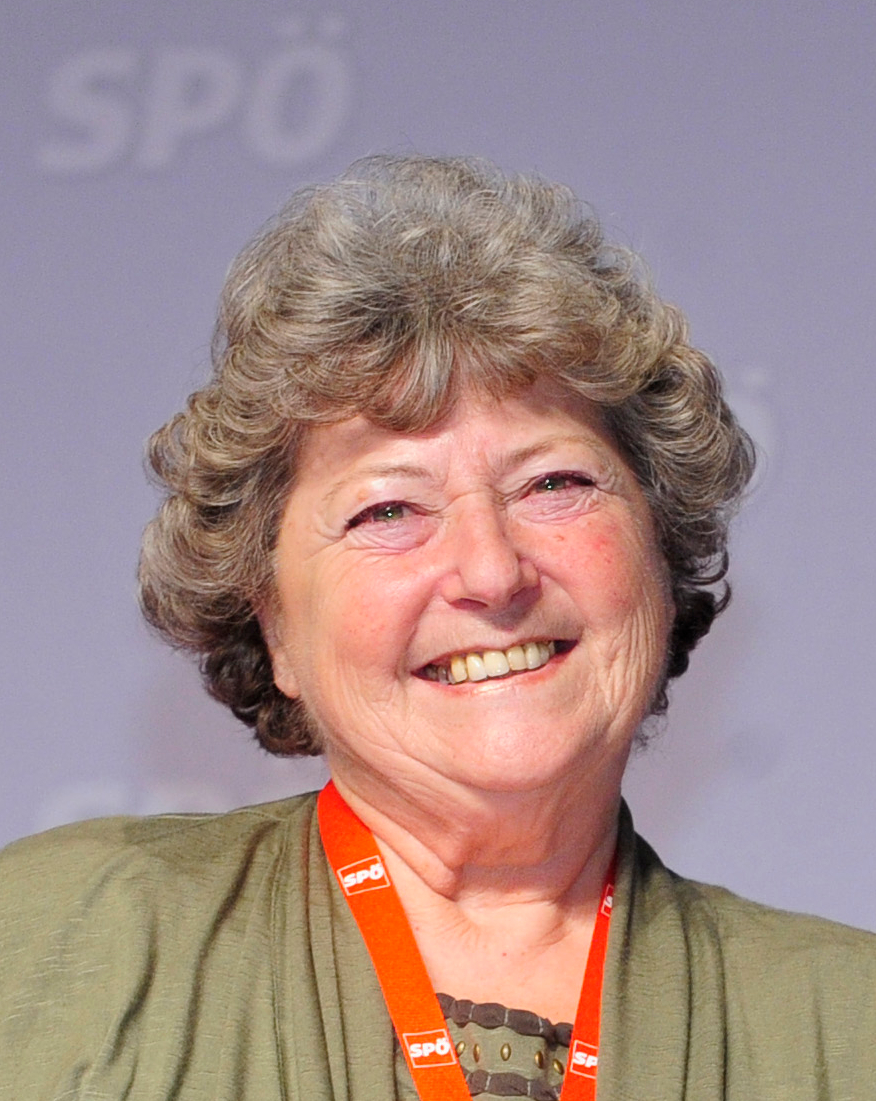
Hostasch in 2014

Eleonora "Lore" Hostasch (born 9 July 1944) is an Austrian politician and trade union leader.

== Life ==
Hostasch was born and raised in Vienna. She became a bank employee at BAWAG in 1962. From 1975 – 1994 she was chairperson of the BAWAG works council. She was active in the Chamber for Workers and Employees, notably becoming its president in 1994 until 1997.

From 1983 she was on the managing board of the Austrian Trade Union Federation (ÖGB) and was deputy chairperson (1986–1989) and then chairwoman (1989–1994) of the Union of Private Sector Employees. She became vice president of the ÖGB from 1991 until 1995.

Hostasch, as a member of the Social Democratic Party of Austria (SPÖ), sat on the Gemeinderat and Landtag of Vienna from 1987 until she was elected to the National Council in 1989. She sat on the National Council until 1994 and again from 1996 to 1997. In January 1997 she was named Minister for Labour, Health and Social Affairs under Chancellor Viktor Klima.

In Klima's cabinet she introduced reforms to the pension system (making early retirement less common) and to health care (forming the Fonds Gesundes Österreich in 1998, among other things). Her political style was described as considerate and open to compromises. Hostasch left government in 2000, following the SPÖ's losses in the 1999 legislative election.

== Awards and honours ==
- Banda de Dama of the Order of Isabella the Catholic (1997)
- Grand Decoration of Honour in Gold with Sash for Services to the Republic of Austria (2000)
- Honourable senator of BOKU Vienna (2009)
- Victor Adler Badge (2014)
