= Wolfgang Mückstein =

Austrian politician

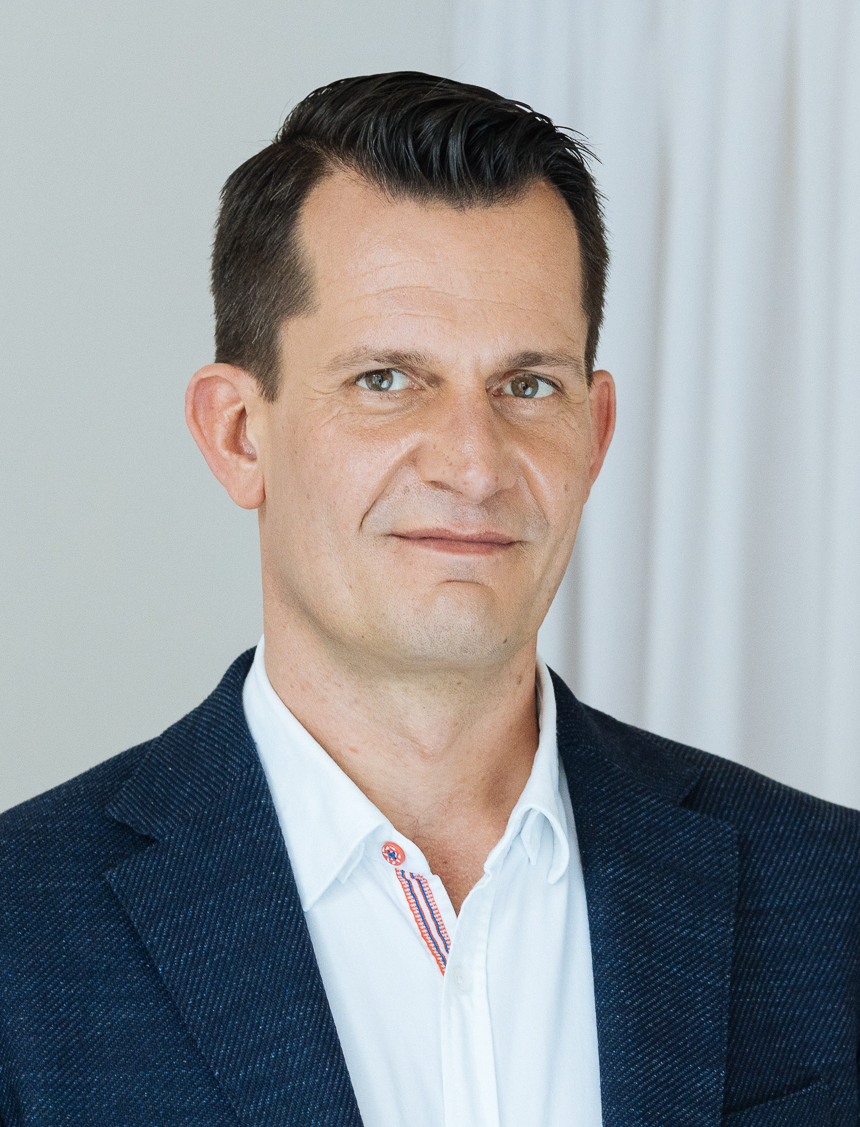
- Wolfgang Mückstein (2021)

Minister for Social Affairs, Health, Care and Consumer Protection
- In office 19 April 2021 – 8 March 2022
- President: Alexander Van der Bellen
- Chancellor: Sebastian Kurz; Alexander Schallenberg; Karl Nehammer
- Preceded by: Rudolf Anschober
- Succeeded by: Johannes Rauch

Personal details
- Born: 5 July 1974 (age 52) Vienna
- Relatives: Katharina Mückstein (sister)

Wolfgang Mückstein (born 5 July 1974 in Vienna) is an Austrian physician and politician. He served as Minister for Social Affairs, Health, Care and Consumer Protection in the governments of chancellors Sebastian Kurz, Alexander Schallenberg and Karl Nehammer from 19 April 2021 until 8 March 2022.

Political offices
Preceded by Rudolf Anschober	Minister of Social Affairs, Health, Care and Consumer Protection; 2021–2022	Succeeded by Johannes Rauch
