= St. Pölten University of Applied Sciences =

University in Austria

Coordinates: 48°12′49.89″N 15°37′55.08″E

Hochschule für Angewandte Wissenschaften St. Pölten St. Pölten University of Applied Sciences
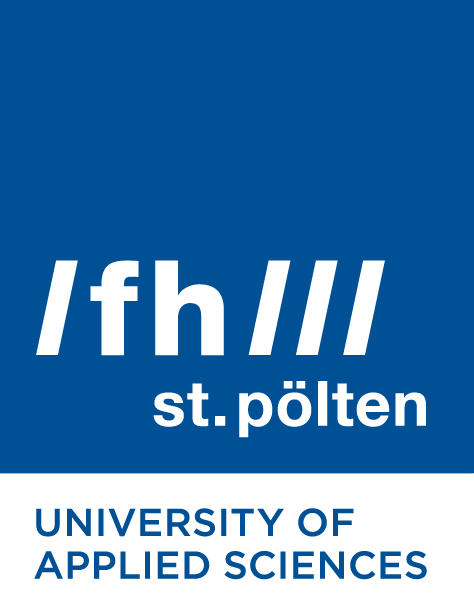
- Motto: It starts with u.
- Type: University of Applied Sciences
- Established: 1993 (first program launched in 1996/97)
- Administrative staff: Executive Board: Johann Haag, Hannes Raffaseder; Staff Members: 367 full-time staff members (administrators and instructors) approximately 906 part-time instructors (as of 2020)
- Students: more than 3.700 (as of 2023)
- Location: Sankt Poelten / Capital of Lower Austria, Austria
- Website: Official website

The St. Pölten University of Applied Sciences (German: Hochschule St. Pölten) is a public university of applied sciences located in St. Pölten, Austria.

The institution offers practice-oriented higher education and professional training in fields including mobility engineering, digital technologies, health sciences, informatics and artificial intelligence, communications, management, media, security, and social sciences.

Around 3,700 students are enrolled in a range of undergraduate, graduate, and continuing education programmes designed to combine academic study with applied research and industry collaboration.

== Facts ==
The St Polten University of Applied Sciences, which coordinates six universities of applied sciences from the same number of nations as a European University in the E3UDRES2 project of the European University Alliance, was one of the finalists in the category of the Young Entrepreneurial University of the Year 2022 at the Europe Triple E-Awards along with GEA College, Universidade NOVA Lisboa, UC Leuven-Limburg and Stuttgart Media University.

In 2021, the Spin-off Austria Initiative, which promotes entrepreneurship in university education, awarded the St. Pölten University of Applied Sciences with 1st place in the "University of Applied Sciences" category.

According to the trend magazine, St. Pölten UAS ranks 10th on the list of Austria's Best 300 Employers.

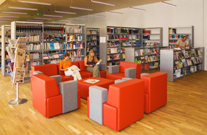
Library

=== History ===
The history of the UAS St. Pölten began in 1993, when the "Verein zur Föderung der Gesellschaft zur Durchführung von Fachhochschul-Studiengängen St. Pölten m.b.H." (eng.: Association for the Advancement of the Society for the Implementation of the University of Applied Sciences St. Pölten ltd.) was founded. In the academic year 1996/97 with Telecommunication and Media the first degree programme started. In January 2004 the facility was awarded the legal designation 'University of Applied Sciences'. In 2007 the St. Pölten UAS moved to the building in the Matthias Corvinus-Straße. At the moment the educational offer covers 15 bachelor's and 16 master's degree programmes as well as 24 further education courses.

== Study programmes ==

=== Degree programmes ===
==== Bachelor's degree programmes ====
- Creative Computing
- Data Science and Artificial Intelligence
- Dietetics
- Health and Nursing PLUS
- IT Security
- Management & Digital Business
- Marketing & Communication
- Media Management
- Media Technology
- Physiotherapy
- Railway Technology and Mobility
- Rail Vehicle Technology
- Smart Engineering of Production Technologies and Processes
- Social Work
- Social Pedagogy

==== Master's degree programmes ====
- Cyber Security and Resilience
- Data Intelligence
- Digital Business Communications
- Digital Design
- Digital Healthcare
- Digital Innovation and Research
- Digital Marketing & Communication
- Digital Media Management
- Digital Media Production
- Digital Management & Sustainability
- Information Security
- Interactive Technologies
- Rail Technology and Management of Railway Systems
- Social Work
- Gamified Reality Applications for Real-world Challenges and Experiences
- Citizen-Centered Digital Health and Social Care

== Further educational courses ==
The spectrum of further education programmes is continuously expanded. Most of these are offered on a part-time basis.

== Research ==
The St. Pölten UAS conducts research in the following institutes and fields of competence:

- Institute for Innovation Systems: The institute puts special focus on digitalisation and ecologization when investigating the interactions between culture, economic and regulatory facets of organisational and social innovation
- Institute of Creative\Media/Technologies: The media focus at the IC\M/T consists of the research groups for Video Production, Audio Design, Media Computing, and Mobile. The institute conducts research in the focus areas creative content & digital heritage, info- & edutainment, and smart tools & digital workflows.
- Institute of IT Security Research: The research focuses on privacy, biometrics, IT forensics, industrial security, anti-forensics, security management, and software security.
- Carl Ritter von Ghega Institute for Integrated Mobility Research: The institute engages in application-oriented research and development with transport and mobility as focus areas.
- Institute of Health Sciences: Topics range from nutrition and exercise in health promotion, disease prevention, therapy and rehabilitation to quality assurance with special consideration for the subject areas of geriatric nutrition, consulting techniques, posture – exercise – locomotion, and health services research as well as interdisciplinary and multidisciplinary topics.
- Ilse Arlt Institute for Social Inclusion Research: The institute conducts research in the fields of social diagnostics, social space analysis, client participation, diversity, senior citizens and their relatives, general questions of inclusion, and use of new media.
- Center for Digital Health Innovation: Topic areas are information and communication technology in the healthcare sector with a focus on active assisted living and motor rehabilitation.
- Josef Ressel Center for Blockchain-Technologies & Security Management: The purpose is to explore and enhance IT security in case of targeted attacks against companies.
- Centre for Artificial Intelligence: The Institute is concerned with basic and applied research on artificial intelligence.

== UAS Board ==
In the UAS Board election of 2020, Alois Frotschnig was elected as chairperson of the board and Susanne Roiser as deputy chairperson for a term of three years.

== Campus ==
In the winter semester 2007/08, the St. Pölten University of Applied Sciences moved into its 14,300-square-metre building which was newly completed at the time.

Since 2013, the UAS has rented additional rooms in the nearby Business & Innovation Centre (BIZ). It also maintains further UAS locations in Heinrich Schneidmadl-Straße, Herzogenburger Straße and Wiener Straße.

In autumn 2021 the new building and the adapted existing building were opened. With a size of 33,000m², the barrier-free campus offers sufficient space for 26 studios and laboratories, the campus media (radio, TV, magazine), a cinema and around 600m² of self-study zones and study labs for students.

It also includes a landscaped campus promenade and campus garden, including an outdoor auditorium and numerous seating areas.

The library of the St. Pölten UAS has a collection of about 50.000 media and has also been hosting a branch of the city library of St. Pölten since 2013.

== On-Campus Media ==
The St. Pölten University of Applied Sciences has its own media channels for TV, print and radio, which can be used by students of all degree programs. Professional laboratories and state-of-the-art equipment enable students to gain media experience with a considerable circulation and reach during their studies.

=== c-tv – Creative Content Channel ===
c-tv produces reports on current topics, short films and pilot films. It also serves as a test laboratory for new TV formats and experiments with the medium of television. All contributions are produced by students. Under the guidance of experienced lecturers, students learn about all the processes involved in developing, producing and presenting a TV programme and carry them out independently. The c-tv Konferenz is held every two years. The conference is dedicated to topics relating to digital television, media production, media technologies and related areas. Numerous lectures and workshops offer the opportunity to exchange ideas with international experts.

=== Campus & City Radio St. Pölten ===
The free radio station also serves as an educational radio station and is the only terrestrial student radio station in Austria. All aspects of everyday radio life are organized exclusively by students. The fields of activity range from moderation and programming, technology and audio production to marketing and event organization.

=== fhSPACEtv ===
fhSPACEtv is an interdisciplinary initiative of the Media Technology and Digital Media Technologies degree programs at the Institute for Creative\Media/Technologies. The aim is to pool creative and artistic potential within the university's departments and to integrate specific approaches and requirements for digital media by bundling contemporary and alternative information channels and forms of presentation for students.

=== SUMO ===
The specialist media magazine, which is published twice a year, offers students in the Media Practice Lab - Journalistic Working Methods (print) and in the free subject SUMO the opportunity to go through all the steps in a media company. SUMO (print, circulation 2,500) and SUMOMAG (online) provide media managers, media teachers, students, and pupils from media focus schools with reports, features, and interviews on current topics in the media industry.

== International affairs ==
The St. Pölten UAS maintains relationships with approximately 150 partner universities in 30 countries. The international coordinators maintain professional contact with partner universities of their focus areas in research and teaching. They consult incoming and outgoing student in subject-related matters, in particular in course selection. The international coordinators work in close collaboration with the Office for International Relations, which offers organisational and administrative support.
