= Supreme executive organ =

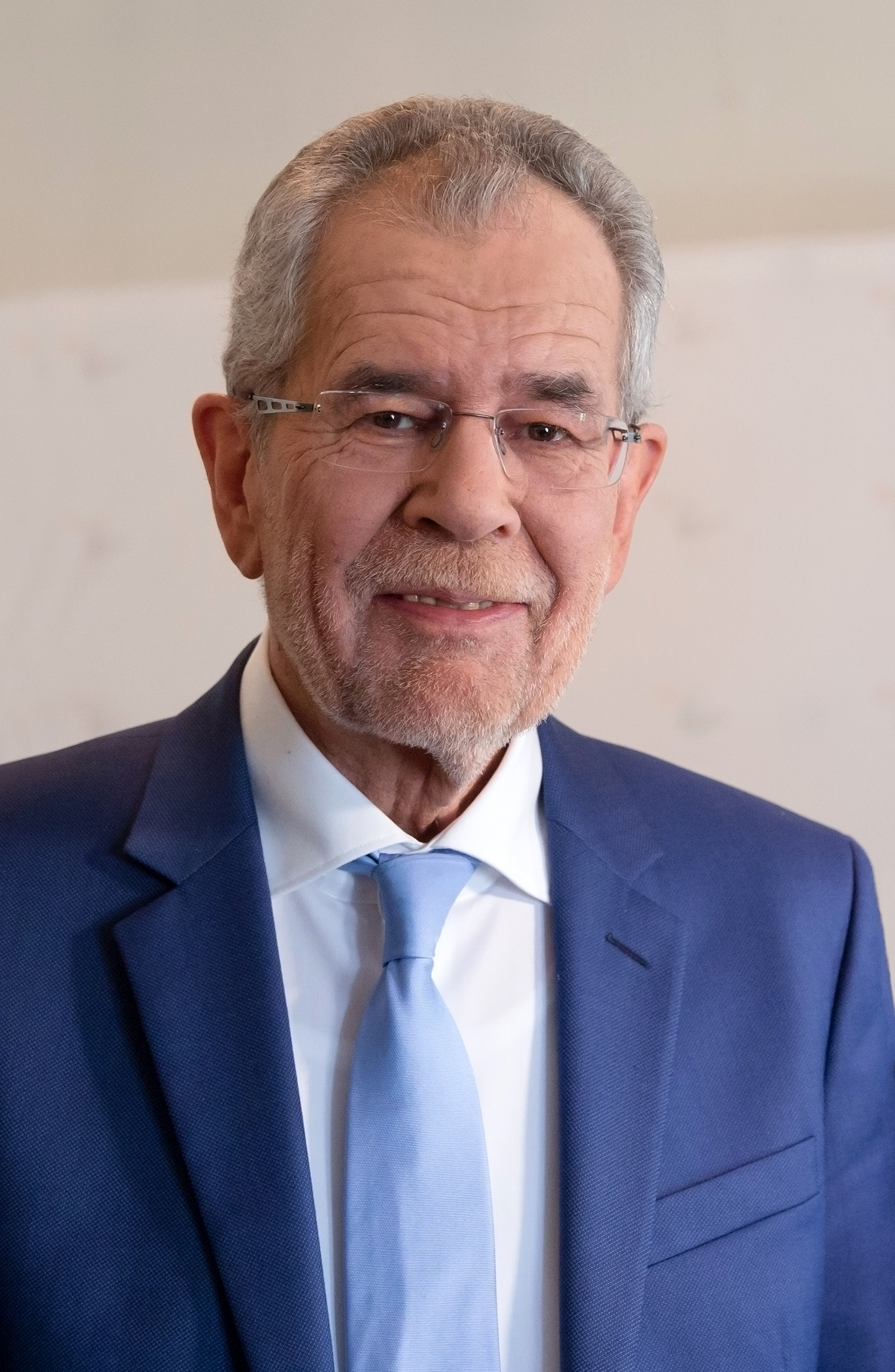
President Alexander Van der Bellen is the supreme executive organ responsible e.g. for appointing ministers, justices, diplomats, and military officers.

In Austrian constitutional law, a supreme executive organ (German: oberstes Verwaltungsorgan), is an elected official, political appointee, or collegiate body with ultimate responsibility for a certain class of administrative decisions – either decisions in some specific area of public administration or decisions of some specific type. The president, for example, is the supreme executive organ with regard to appointing judges; the minister of justice is the supreme executive organ with regard to running the prosecution service; the president of the Constitutional Court is the supreme executive organ with regard to the operational management of the Constitutional Court. The Constitutional Court itself, on the other hand, is not a supreme organ because its decisions, while definitive, are judicial and not administrative in nature.

Although supreme executive organs, by definition, cannot be overruled by any other person or institution in the executive branch, the constitution still means for them to be politically answerable to the officials, institutions, or electorates that have installed them. The president, for instance, is elected by the people and can be recalled by the people; the chancellor is appointed by the president and can be dismissed by the president; governors are elected by provincial legislatures and can be removed by provincial legislatures. Most supreme executive organs can also be impeached or removed through parliamentary motions of no confidence.

== Background ==
Austria is a parliamentary republic. The constitution establishes a number of features that can make the country look semi-presidential from a distance; most notably, the Austrian chancellor and the rest of the cabinet are not elected by the legislature but appointed by the president, who is in turn elected directly by the people. The semi-presidential elements are mostly nominal, however; the country is almost purely parliamentary in practice. Like any other parliamentary republic, Austria has no systematic separation of powers between its legislative and executive branches of government; the constitution engenders an intermingling of the two branches that has the effect of a fusion of powers instead.

The intermingling exists on all three levels of government:

- On the national level, the cabinet is unable to govern effectively without majority support in the National Council because the day-to-day administration of the country requires frequent updates to legislation. The National Council can also overthrow the cabinet through a vote of no confidence, which only requires a simple majority. As a result, the chancellor is chosen by the president on paper only; the president is more or less forced – and bound by long-standing convention – to appoint as chancellor whichever majority leader the legislature will preselect. The National Council, on the other hand, is rudderless without guidance from a functioning cabinet, to the point that it will readily dissolve itself if the ruling coalition breaks down and no other coalition emerges to replace it.
- Provincial governors and their cabinets are elected by provincial parliaments. In seven out of nine provinces, the composition of the cabinet is in fact required by law to reflect the proportional strength of the parties in the legislature.
- In some parts of Austria, mayors are chosen by direct popular election. In most of the country, however, mayors are elected by city councils. City councils are not parliaments sensu stricto in so far as they do not enact statutes, but they do issue ordinances (Verordnungen), a form of secondary legislation, and pass budgets.

In a system like this, the way to prevent any one executive official or committee from becoming too powerful is a separation of powers within the executive. The Austrian constitution thus divides the set of administrative decisions that have to be made into numerous disjoint subsets such that ultimate responsibility for different subsets lies with different persons or institutions. A person or institution with ultimate responsibility for some class of administrative decision is a supreme executive organ.

== Terminology ==
The German word "Organ" in the sense of a person or committee acting on behalf of an institution is usually rendered as "body" by professional legal translators, including in cases where the "body" consists of a single individual. This is done partly for stylistic reasons and partly to avoid ambiguity; the English "organ" is occasionally used as a synonym for "branch of government". Publications specifically about Austrian constitutional and administrative law, however, have historically preferred "organ".

== Description ==
The Austrian constitution uses the term "supreme executive organ" multiple times but provides neither an intensional nor an extensional definition. Article 19 of the Federal Constitutional Law contains what appears to be a taxative enumeration of supreme executive organs, but this list is universally dismissed as specious and useless. The defining characteristics of supreme executive organs and the consequences of membership to the class have been established by case law and academic scholarship.

=== General characteristics ===
A supreme organ does not take orders (Weisungen) from any other part of the executive branch and cannot be overruled by any other part of the executive branch. Its decisions are final. If an organ has been declared supreme by constitutional law or conclusively identified as supreme by jurisprudence, any mechanism that would allow its decisions to be appealed is automatically unconstitutional.

A supreme organ acts exclusively on its own initiative. On the one hand, it cannot be forced to act. On the other hand, its decisions cannot be made contingent on requests or nominations from other organs; it cannot be made to depend on the advice and consent of any other person or institution. The one exception to this general rule is the president. Most of the powers of the president can only be exercised on request of the chancellor, one of the other ministers, or the cabinet as a whole. Most decisions made on request of the chancellor or the cabinet do not become effective until countersigned by the chancellor; decisions requested by a minister other than the chancellor do not become effective until countersigned by that minister.

A supreme organ is only supreme with respect to a specific class of decisions. A governor, for example, is a supreme organ with respect to certain decisions within the purview of the province. Much of what provinces actually do, however, is assist the national government with matters of the national administration. When acting as an arm of the national administration, the governor takes orders from national administrators, most notably ministers.

With the exception of the president, who discharges the powers and duties of the office either personally or not at all, supreme executive organs stand at the head of sizable bureaucracies and delegate most of their tasks to subordinate organs (nachgeordnete Organe). As a matter of general principle, supreme executive organs are vested with management authority (Leitungsgewalt), meaning they are in charge of setting policy, of most personnel decisions, and of the internal governance and discipline of their respective bureaucracies in general. They also have injunction authority (Weisungsgewalt), the power to issue orders (Weisungen) to their respective subordinate organs that require or prohibit specific substantive acts and decisions. Both powers follow from the postulate that supreme executive organs hold ultimate responsibility; an organ cannot be considered responsible for what it cannot effectively control. There are departures from this general principle, however. Some subordinate organs are "independent" ("weisungsfrei"); they are subject to management authority but not injunction authority.

=== Rule of law ===
Executive organs can only exercise powers explicitly vested in them by statute and generally have to abide by the law, primary and secondary, constitutional and other. Supreme executive organs are not exempt from this rule. Supreme executive organs are also not exempt from judicial review; while their decisions cannot be overturned by other members of the executive, they can be fought in court.

=== Answerability ===
On the one hand, a mechanism must exist for an ineffectual or misbehaving supreme executive organ to be removed. On the other hand, if removal is too cheap in terms of political capital or if the option is available to too many actors, the independence of the supreme executive organ becomes purely notional, the claim to ultimate responsibility a farce. The compromise implemented by the Austrian constitution distinguishes between political answerability for policy choices and judicial answerability for violations of the law. It involves three general rules:

- A supreme executive organ is politically answerable, and can be removed by, the person, institution, or electorate that has installed it.
  Selected examples:
  - The president is elected by the people; the president can be recalled via plebiscite.
  - The chancellor is appointed by the president and can be dismissed by the president. A minister other than the chancellor is appointed by the president on nomination by the chancellor and can be dismissed by the president on request by the chancellor.
  - Provincial cabinets are elected by provincial parliaments and are subject to motions of no confidence by provincial parliaments.
- A minister, including a chancellor, is also politically answerable to the National Council, which can order him or her removed through a vote of no confidence.
- Supreme executive organs can also be impeached before the Constitutional Court for misconduct in office. Impeachment is limited to allegations of culpable violations of actual law; mere political malpractice is not enough. As a special case, the president can only be impeached for culpable violations of constitutional law. Cabinet members are impeached by the National Council. Most other officials are impeached by the cabinet. Members of provincial administrations are impeached by the National Council, the cabinet, or a provincial legislature, depending on the nature of the alleged transgression. The president is impeached by the Federal Assembly. The president of the Court of Auditors is impeached by the National Council or by one of the provincial parliaments, depending on who or what was being audited when the alleged transgression occurred.

An obvious exception to these general rules are the two supreme executive organs that are justices, the president of the Constitutional Court and the president of the Supreme Administrative Court. Being justices, presidents of courts receive lifetime appointments in order to guarantee judicial independence. Even justices, however, can be removed in case of material misconduct:

- Judges can be dismissed if found guilty of serious crime or severe ethics violations. Disciplinary proceedings are essentially trials, usually before one of the higher regional courts or before the Supreme Court of Justice. Members of the Supreme Administrative Court are tried by the Supreme Administrative Court; they are otherwise subject to the same regulations as regular judges.
- Members of the Constitutional Court are exempt from conventional disciplinary action. Members that have proven themselves unworthy of their position can, however, be voted off the bench by a majority of two thirds of their peers.

=== Article 19 ===
Article 19 of the Federal Constitutional Law, the backbone of the constitution, empowers the National Council to enact incompatibility provisions that bar presidents, ministers, and members of provincial governments from holding positions in the private sector during their time in office. In its first sentence, Article 19 states that "the supreme executive organs are the president, the ministers and state secretaries, and the members of the provincial governments" ("Die obersten Organe der Vollziehung sind der Bundespräsident, die Bundesminister und Staatssekretäre sowie die Mitglieder der Landesregierungen"). The language seems to imply that this list is meant to be an authoritative, taxative enumeration. Early scholarship has tended to accept it as such. Modern case law and the modern scholarly literature observe that Article 19 is problematic in several ways:

- The list is incomplete.
- The list includes organs that are not supreme, or in fact not even organs:
  - State secretaries are assistants to ministers. A state secretary helps the minister manage the minister's bureaucratic apparatus and represents, if directed to do so, the minister in the National Council. The minister can delegate some of their responsibilities to the secretary; for instance, the secretary can be made head of one of the relevant ministry's sections. In all these capacities, the secretary takes orders (Weisungen) from the minister, meaning that the secretary is not "supreme" by any stretch of the imagination.
  - The members of a provincial government are not necessarily organs; they usually only collectively form an organ.
- Written mainly by Hans Kelsen and following Kelsen's preferred ontology, the Federal Constitutional Law establishes Austria as a country with two branches of government: the legislative branch (Gesetzgebung), which creates the law (Latin: legis latio), and the executive branch (Vollziehung), which applies the law (legis executio). The executive branch has two subdivisions: the administrative branch (Verwaltung), which deals with public administration, and the judicial branch (Gerichtsbarkeit), which deals with conflict resolution. The constitution, accordingly, refers to supreme executive organs as organs of the Verwaltung. Article 19, on the other hand, refers to the supreme organs of the Vollziehung. Assuming this discrepancy is not simply due to a lapse of attention on the part of Kelsen, not an author generally noted for sloppiness, Article 19 was never meant to provide a definition of "supreme executive organ".

Modern case law and the modern scholarly literature agree that the best approach is to simply be literal: a person or collegial body that is clearly meant to be supreme, executive, and an organ should be treated as a member of the class of supreme executive organs. The enumeration in Article 19 should be considered relevant only in the context of Article 19 itself: it should be read as a list of people that can be made subject to incompatibility legislation and should otherwise be ignored.

== List of supreme executive organs ==
In charge of public-facing substantive administration:

- President
- Chancellor
- Ministers in general
- The cabinet as a whole
- Governors
- Members of provincial governments in general, in some provinces and under certain circumstances
- The provincial governments themselves
- Municipal councils

In charge of the internal procedural management of courts, legislatures, or agencies:

- The president of the Constitutional Court
- The president of the Supreme Administrative Court
- The president of the National Council
- The president of the Ombudsman Board (Volksanwaltschaft)
- The president of the Court of Auditors
