= Chancellor of Austria =

Head of government

Federal Chancellor of the Republic of Austria
- Bundeskanzler der Republik Österreich (German)
- Coat of Arms

- State flag

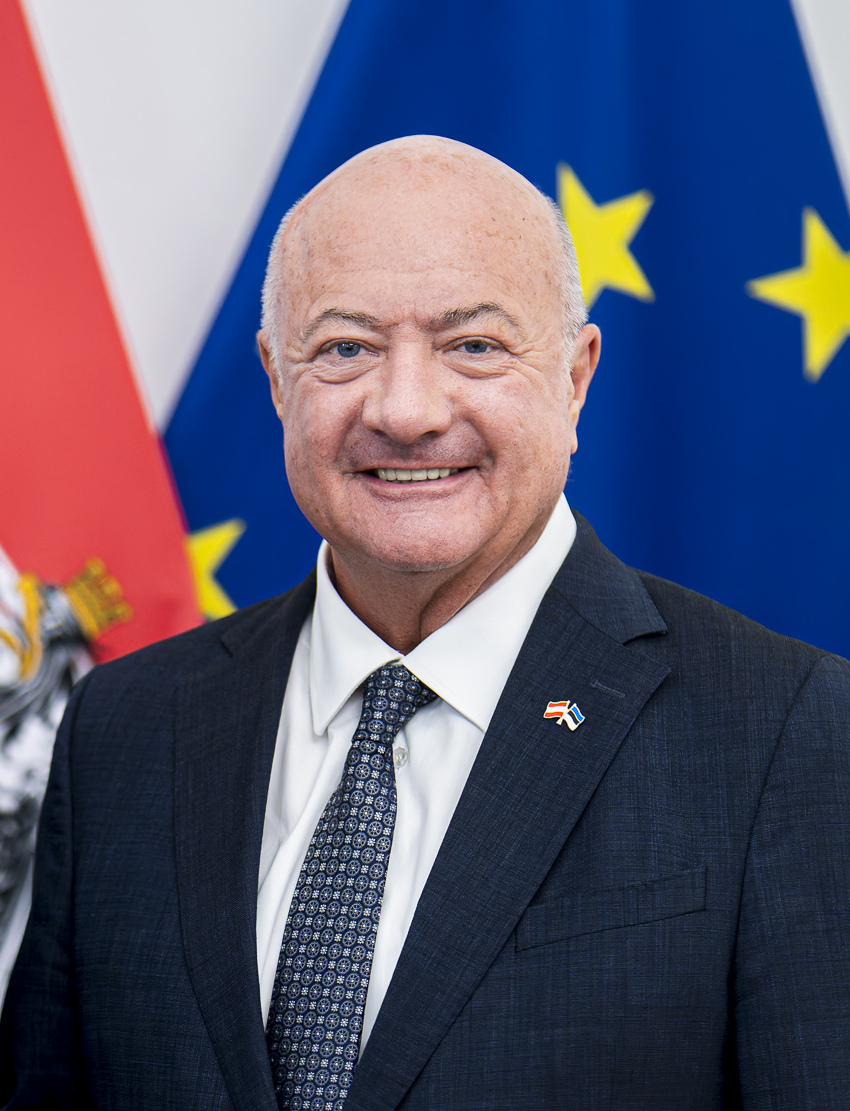
- Incumbent; Christian Stocker since 3 March 2025
- Chancellery
- Style: Mr Chancellor; His Excellency (diplomatic)
- Type: Head of government
- Status: Supreme executive organ Minister
- Member of: Cabinet; European Council; National Security Council
- Seat: Chancellery Building; Ballhausplatz, Innere Stadt, Vienna
- Appointer: President
- Term length: No fixed term
- Constituting instrument: Constitution of Austria
- Precursor: Minister-President of Cisleithania
- Formation: 30 October 1918 (107 years ago)
- First holder: Karl Renner
- Deputy: Vice-Chancellor
- Salary: €306,446 annually
- Website: federal-chancellery.gv.at

The chancellor of Austria, officially the federal chancellor of the Republic of Austria (German: Bundeskanzler der Republik Österreich), is the head of government of the Republic of Austria.

Twenty-nine people have served as chancellor. The current holder of the office Christian Stocker was sworn in on 3 March 2025 as chancellor.

== In political system ==
Austria's chancellor chairs and leads the cabinet, which is composed of the chancellor, the vice chancellor and the ministers. Together with the president, who is head of state, the cabinet forms the country's executive branch leadership.

Austria is officially a semi-presidential republic. Although it functions more like a parliamentary republic by constitutional convention, most executive actions of great extent can only be exercised by the president, upon advice or with the countersignature of the chancellor or a specific minister. Therefore the chancellor often requires the president's consent to implement greater decisions. Neither the ministers nor the vice chancellor report to the chancellor.

In legislature, the chancellor's power depends on the size of their affiliated parliamentary group. In case of a coalition cabinet, the chancellor commonly is the leader of the party most represented in the National Council, with the leader of the party able to grant a majority, usually serving as the vice chancellor.

The first Austrian sovereign head of government was the State Chancellor of the Austrian Empire, a position only held by Klemens von Metternich. The office was later renamed to Minister-President of the Austrian Empire and remained from there on until the dissolution of Austria-Hungary. The first head of government after the monarchy was the State Chancellor of German-Austria, an office again only held by one person; Karl Renner. After allied powers declined a union between Austria and Germany, the office was renamed to just State Chancellor of Austria and later changed to Federal Chancellor, which remains the position's current form.

The official residence and executive office of the chancellor is the chancellery, which is located at the Ballhausplatz in the center of Vienna. Both the chancellor as well as the cabinet are appointed by the president and can be dismissed by the president.

The current officeholder is Christian Stocker, who was sworn in as chancellor on 3 March 2025 by President Alexander Van der Bellen.

== History ==
The use of the term Chancellor (Kanzler, derived from Latin: cancellarius) as head of the chancery writing office can be traced back as far as the 9th century, when under King Louis the German the office of the Archchancellor (Erzkanzler), later Imperial Chancellor (Reichserzkanzler), was created as a high office on the service of the Holy Roman Emperor. The task was usually fulfilled by the Prince-Archbishops of Mainz as Archchancellors of the German lands.

In the course of the Imperial reform, the Habsburg Emperor Maximilian I in 1498 attempted to counter the spiritual power of the Reichserzkanzler with a more secular position of an Imperial Court Chancellor (Hofkanzler), but the two became merged. These were also the times when attempts were made to balance Imperial absolutism by the creation of Imperial Governments (Reichsregiment), ultimately a failure.

=== Habsburg Monarchy ===
Nevertheless, when Maximilian's grandson Ferdinand I succeeded him as Archduke of Austria in 1521, his elder brother Emperor Charles V (1519–1556) appointed Mercurino Gattinara as "Grand Chancellor of all the realms and kingdoms of the king" (Großkanzler aller Länder und Königreiche). The separate position of an Austrian Court Chancellor appeared as a Österreichische Hofkanzlei around 1526, when the Habsburg monarchy arose with the Bohemian and Hungarian inheritance; it was however once again merged with the equivalent Reichshofkanzlei office of the Holy Roman Empire in 1559.

Upon the 1620 Battle of White Mountain and the suppression of the Bohemian revolt, Emperor Ferdinand II had separate Court Chancelleries established in order to strengthen the unity of the Habsburg hereditary lands. Beside a Bohemian and Hungarian chancellery, he created the office of an Austrian chancellor in Vienna, responsible for the Archduchy of Austria proper (i.e. Upper and Lower Austria) with the Inner Austrian territories and Tyrol. Under Emperor Leopold I (1658–1705) the term again became Hofkanzler with Johann Paul Freiherr von Hocher (1667–1683), and Theodor von Strattman (1683–1693).

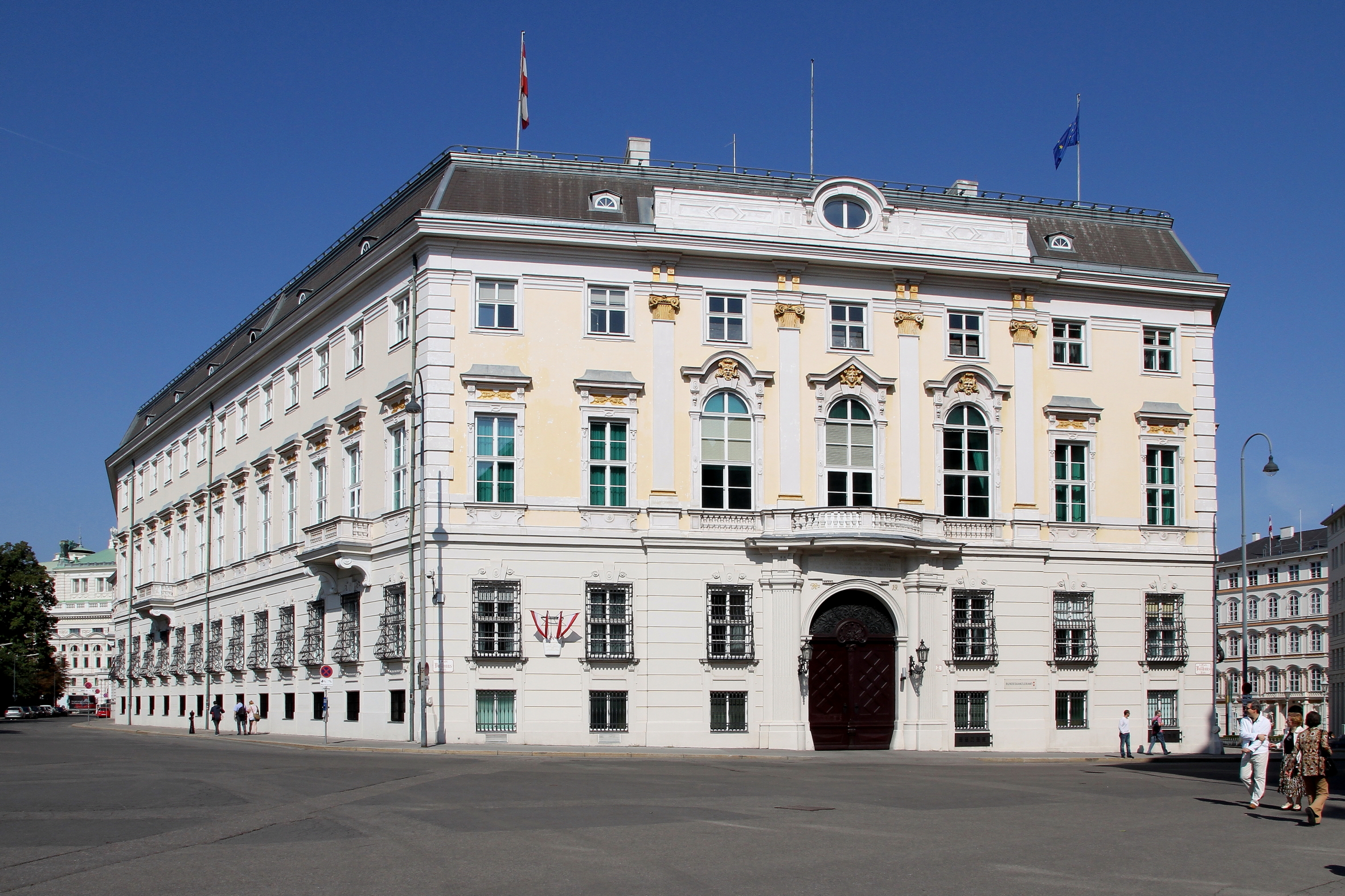
Federal Chancellery on Ballhausplatz, former Geheime Hofkanzlei

The eighteenth century was dominated by Prince Wenzel Anton of Kaunitz-Rietberg (1753–1792), who was Chancellor to four Habsburg emperors from Maria Theresa to Francis II, with the titles of both Hofkanzler and Staatskanzler. He was succeeded by Johann Philipp von Cobenzl (1792–1793), who was dismissed by Emperor Francis II over the Partition of Poland and was succeeded by Johann Amadeus von Thugut (1793–1800). Thugut's chancellorship did not survive the Austrian defeats by the French at the battles of Marengo and Hohenlinden in 1800 and he was replaced by Count Ludwig von Cobenzl (1800–1805), his predecessor's cousin, but who in turn was dismissed following the Austrian defeat at Austerlitz in 1805.

=== Austrian Empire ===
With the consequent dissolution of the Holy Roman Empire and founding of the Austrian Empire, Francis II abdicated the former Imperial Throne, but remained Emperor Francis I of Austria in 1806. He had replaced Cobenzl with Johann Philipp Stadion, Count von Warthausen (1805–1809) the previous year, but his career was in turn cut short in 1809 following yet another Austrian defeat by Napoleon at the Battle of Wagram and subsequent humiliation at the Treaty of Schönbrunn. Prince Klemens von Metternich was appointed by Francis I to the positions of Hofkanzler and Staatskanzler (1821–1848). However, there is some opinion that the Chancellor title was not used between Prince Kaunitz-Rietberg's resignation in 1792 and 1821. As the Metternich system had become a synonym for his reactionary politics, the title of a State Chancellor was abolished upon the 1848 revolutions. The position became that of a Minister-President of Austria, equivalent to Prime Minister, with the exception of Count Friedrich Ferdinand von Beust (1867–1871) the title only re-emerging at the birth of German Austria after World War I in 1918, when Karl Renner was appointed Staatskanzler. With the enactment of the Constitution of Austria on 10 November 1920, the actual term Bundeskanzler was implemented as head of the executive branch of the First Austrian Republic.

== Appointment ==
The Chancellor is appointed and sworn in by the President. In theory, the President can appoint anyone eligible to be elected to the National Council, essentially meaning any Austrian national over the age of 18. In practice, a Chancellor is unable to govern without the confidence of the National Council. For this reason, the Chancellor usually is the leader of the largest party in the National Council, or the senior partner in a coalition government. A notable exception to this occurred after the 1999 election. The Freedom Party won the most seats and went into coalition with the People's Party. While this would have normally made Freedom Party leader Jörg Haider Chancellor, he was deemed too controversial to be a member of the Cabinet, let alone Chancellor. He thus stepped aside in favour of People's Party leader Wolfgang Schüssel.

There are no term limits for the Chancellor. As a matter of constitutional convention, the Chancellor usually offers their resignation to the President upon dissolution of the National Council. The President usually declines the offer of resignation and directs the Chancellor and the cabinet to operate as a caretaker government until a new National Council is in session and a new majority leader has emerged. In fact, the constitution expressly encourages the President to use a Chancellor as the interim successor.

A Chancellor is typically appointed or dismissed together with all of the ministers, which means the whole government. Technically, the President can only appoint ministers on advice of the Chancellor, so the Chancellor is appointed first. Having been sworn in, the Chancellor presents the President with a list of ministers; they will usually have been installed just minutes later. Neither Chancellors nor ministers need to be confirmed by either house of parliament; the appointees are fully capable of discharging the functions of their respective offices immediately after having been sworn in.

The National Council can force the President to dismiss a Chancellor or a minister through a vote of no confidence. The President is constitutionally required to sack any minister whom the National Council wants gone. Opposition parties will sometimes table votes of no confidence against ministers, and occasionally whole cabinets, in order to demonstrate criticism; these votes had not been expected to pass. The first successful vote of no confidence in Austrian federal politics took place in May 2019 when Sebastian Kurz was ousted as Chancellor.

== Role and powers ==
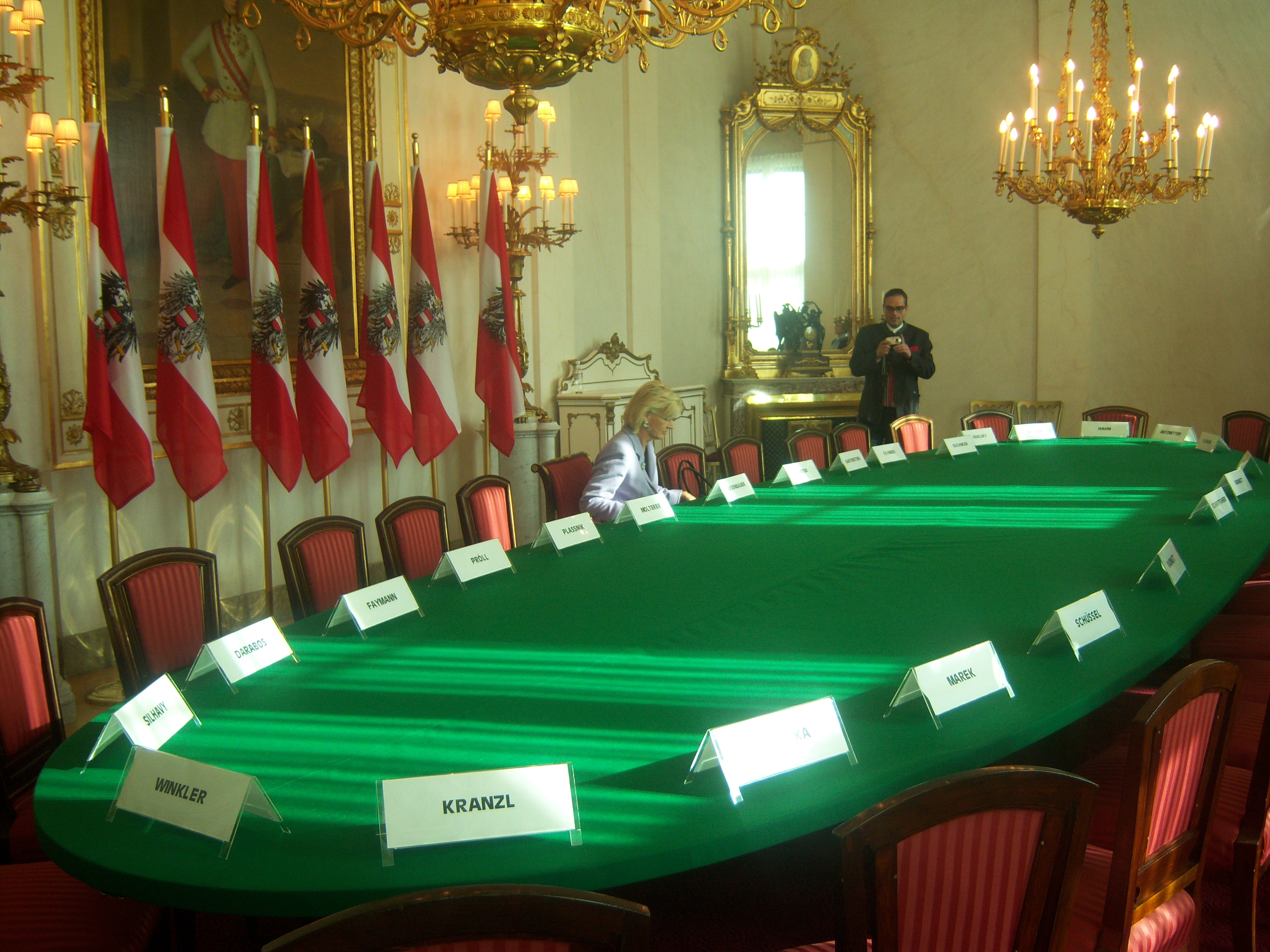
Ministers Council room in the Federal Chancellery.

The Chancellor chairs the meetings of the cabinet. The constitution does not vest the Chancellor with the authority to issue directions to ministers; it characterizes his or her role in the cabinet as that of a primus inter pares. The power of the office to set policy derives partly from its inherent prestige, partly from the fact that the President is required to dismiss ministers the Chancellor requests removed, and partly from the Chancellor's position of leadership in the party or coalition controlling the National Council.

Most articles of the constitution that mention the office of Chancellor are tasking the incumbent with notarizing decisions by the President or by various constitutional bodies, with ensuring that these decisions are duly announced to the general public, or with acting as an intermediary between various branches of government. In particular, the Chancellor

- submits bills passed by the National Council to the President for certification,
- countersigns certifications of bills made by the President,
- announces the bills that have thus become laws,
- announces treaties the Republic of Austria is party to upon ratification,
- announces Constitutional Court decision overturning laws or executive orders,
- announces the results of Presidential elections,
- announces changes to the Rules of Procedure adopted by the Federal Council,
- countersigns decisions reached by the Federal Assembly,
- announces declarations of war, and
- notifies provincial governments of bills passed by the National Council that require their assent to become law.

The Chancellor also convenes the Federal Assembly if the National Council moves to have the President removed from office, or if the National Council moves to lift the immunity of the President from criminal prosecution. In the former case, the Federal Assembly votes on whether to allow a referendum on the matter. In the latter case, the assent of the Federal Assembly is required for the President's immunity to be rescinded.

Finally, the Chancellor becomes Acting President if the President is incapacitated. However, if the President remains incapacitated beyond twenty days or has died, the role of Acting President is passed on to the three Presidents of the National Council.

== See also ==
- Politics of Austria
- Constitution of Austria
- Austrian Government
- List of chancellors of Austria
- Vice-Chancellor of Austria
- Chancellery of Austria
- President of Austria
