= Ministry of Social Affairs, Health, Care and Consumer Protection =

Government ministry of Austria

Federal Ministry of Social Affairs, Health, Care and Consumer Protection
- Bundesministerium für Soziales, Gesundheit, Pflege und Konsumentenschutz
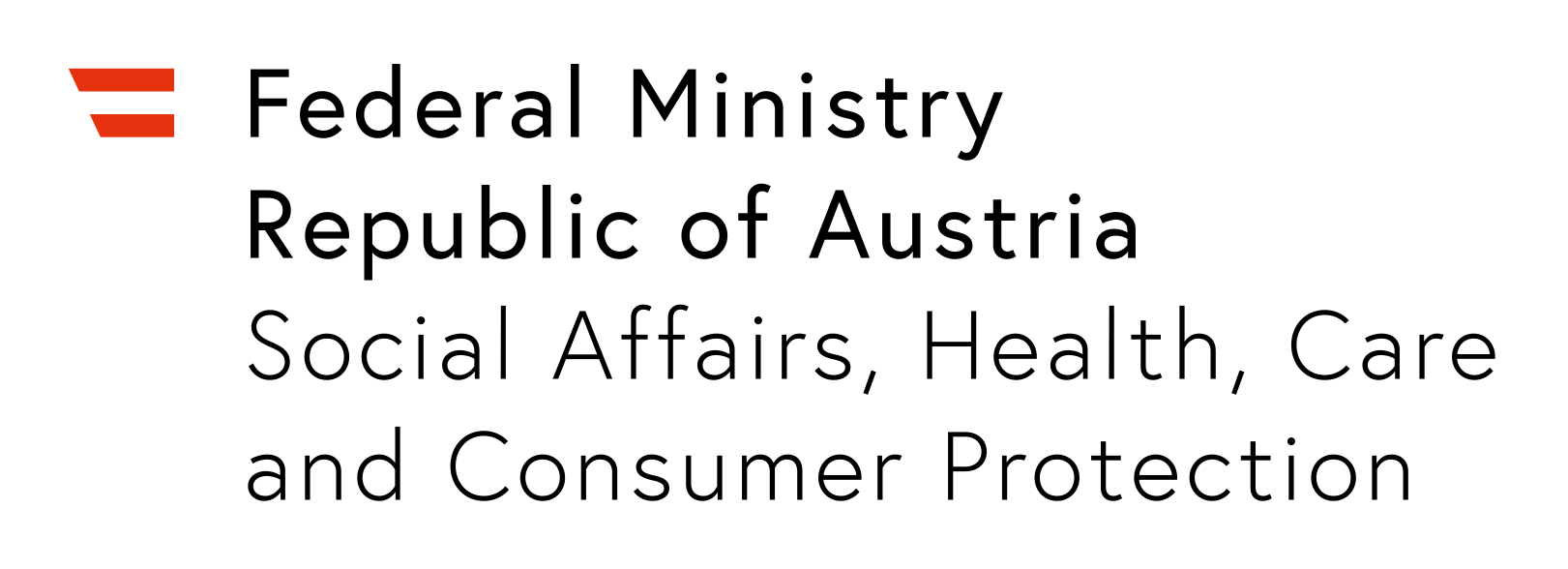

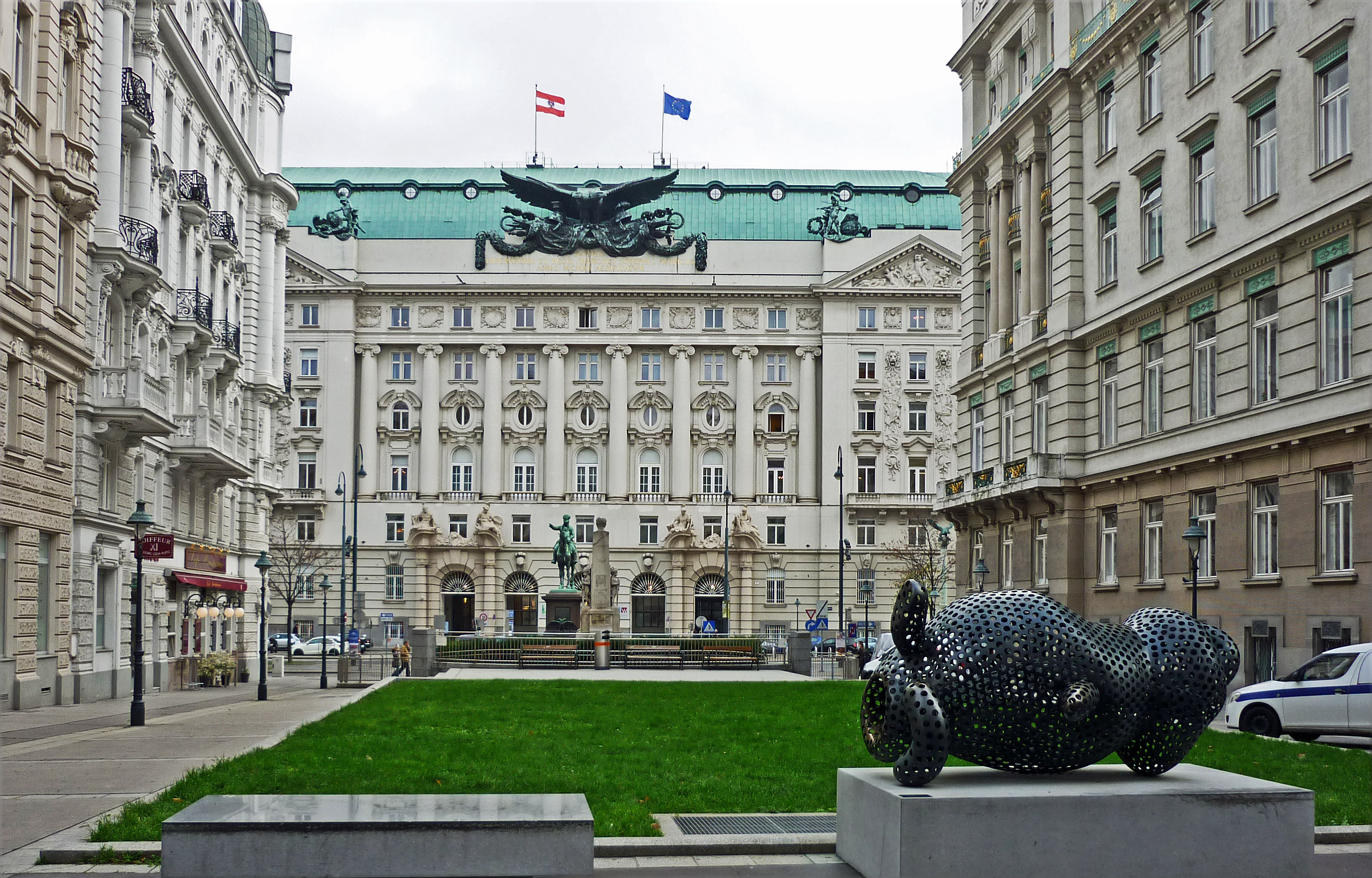

Ministry overview
- Formed: 1917; 109 years ago
- Jurisdiction: Austria
- Headquarters: Stubenring 1 Vienna; 48°12′35″N 16°22′59″E
- Minister responsible: Johannes Rauch, Minister of Social Affairs
- Website: sozialministerium.at

In Austrian politics, the Federal Ministry of Social Affairs, Health, Care and Consumer Protection (Bundesministerium für Soziales, Gesundheit, Pflege und Konsumentenschutz) is the ministry in charge of welfare policy.

The Ministry was first created in 1917 as the Ministry of Social Welfare (Ministerium für soziale Fürsorge). In its modern form, it dates back to the 1987 establishment of the Ministry of Labor and Social Affairs (Ministerium für Arbeit und Soziales). From January 2018 to January 2020, the Ministry's official name was Ministry of Labor, Social Affairs, Health, and Consumer Protection (Bundesministerium für Arbeit, Soziales, Gesundheit und Konsumentenschutz). It is responsible for welfare, senior citizens affairs, health care, and consumer policy; it is also charged with stimulating job creation and fighting unemployment. In spite of its official designation, the Ministry is only rarely referred to as the Ministry of Labor (Arbeitsministerium). The moniker does see occasional use, but the traditional short form of Ministry of Social Affairs (Sozialministerium) clearly predominates.

== History ==
The Ministry was first established in 1917 as the Ministry of Social Welfare (Ministerium für soziale Fürsorge). Created in the final days of World War I, a time of widespread hunger and destitution, it was concerned almost exclusively with pensions and benefits for subjects widowed, crippled, or impoverished by the conflict. After the war, it took control of Austria's developing system of social insurance. Gradually expanding, it existed in more or less its original form until 1987.

Austria did not have a Ministry of Labor, or any other cabinet-level government agency with Labor in its name, for much of its existence. In the decade leading up to the Anschluss and to World War II, implacable hostility between Social Democrats and Christian Conservatives had eroded civil society, undermined democratic institutions, and sparked a civil war; the Christian Social Party eventually manufactured a constitutional crisis that allowed it to replace the Republic of Austria with the Federal State of Austria, a Fascist single-party state. In light of these experiences, Austrian politicians chose to reinvent the country as a consociationalist republic when Nazi Germany had collapsed and Austria, devastated and occupied by the victors, needed to be rebuilt.

For the first few decades of postwar Austria, its new ethos of consensus decision making was an undisputed success, at least in terms of stability and prosperity. Social Democrats and Conservatism, while still intensely mistrustful of each other's motives and jealous of each other's influence, ruled the country through a series of constructive and mutually beneficial "grand coalition" cabinets. The Sozialpartnerschaft, a system of ritualized confrontation and conflict resolution between state-sponsored industrialists' lobbies and state-sponsored workers' unions, essentially dictated social policy to Parliament − while obviously questionable from a perspective of democratic purism, the system created rapid economic growth, near-full employment, and general social harmony all at the same time. It simply did not occur to either party that a dedicated Ministry of Labor should be necessary to protect workers' interests.

When Franz Vranitzky did establish a Ministry of Labor and Social Affairs (Bundesministerium für Arbeits und Soziales) in 1987 by extending and renaming the existing Ministry of Social Affairs, the move was a consequence of the decay of the postwar system. The Wirtschaftswunder years were over. Austria's nationalized heavy industries were in trouble. Some of the country's largest employers were in danger; the credibility of the Sozialpartnerschaft was suffering. At the same time, Austria's party landscape was changing: the combined vote share of Social Democrats and People's Party was declining; parliamentarism was becoming more vigorous and assertive. It was clear that future cabinets were going to have to take charge of employment policy and workers' welfare more directly and with more parliamentary accountability.

In 1997, the Klima cabinet dissolved the Ministry of Health and Consumer Protection and transferred its responsibilities in matters of health care to what was now called the Ministry of Labor, Health, and Social Affairs (Bundesministerium für Arbeit, Gesundheit und Soziales). The Chancellery was put in charge of consumer protection.

A few years and one election later, in 2003, the Schüssel I cabinet split the Ministry into three: Labor was attached to the Ministry of Economy. Social Affairs became a ministry in its own right again; Health became a standalone ministry as well. The new Ministry of Health was also in charge of family affairs; the Ministry of Social Affairs took back consumer protection from the Chancellery. A few years later, in 2009, responsibilities were shuffled again: the Faymann cabinet removed labor affairs from the Ministry of Economy, creating an independent Ministry of Labor once again; Labor then absorbed Social Affairs.

In 2018, the Ministry also absorbed the Ministry of Health. On 29 January 2020, it was renamed Federal Ministry of Social Affairs, Health, Care and Consumer Protection.

== Structure ==
As of May 2018, the ministry consists of the Minister and his personal staff (Kabinett), the office of the director general (Generalsekretär), and ten numbered regular departments (Sektionen):

- Presidium, support, IT (Präsidialangelegenheiten, Supportfunktionen, IT)
- Social insurance (Sozialversicherung)
- Consumer protection (Konsumentenschutz)
- Nursing care insurance, disabilities matters, benefits policy (Pflegevorsorge, Behinderten-, Versorgungs- und Sozialhilfeangelegenheiten)
- European and international policy outlook (Europäische, internationale und sozialpolitische Grundsatzfragen)
- Labor market (Arbeitsmarkt)
- Employment law and employment law enforcement (Arbeitsrecht und Zentral-Arbeitsinspektorat)
- Health care (Gesundheitssystem)
- Patients' rights and health care consumer protection (Recht und Gesundheitlicher VerbraucherInnenschutz)
- Public health and medical matters (Öffentliche Gesundheit und medizinische Angelegenheiten)

The Minister and his staff are political appointees; the director general and the section heads are career civil servants.
