= Black–blue coalition =

Coalition in Austria or Germany

The parties involved in Austria

Austrian People's Party

Freedom Party of Austria

The term black-blue coalition or blue-black coalition refers, especially in Austria and Germany, to a cooperation between Christian democratic- conservative (center-right) and national conservative (right-wing) parties.

In the Germanosphere, the name of the coalition refers to the party colours (German: Schwarz-blaue Koalition)

In Austria, this term (here also turquoise-blue coalition or blue-turquoise coalition) refers to a coalition between the black (since 2017 turquoise) Austrian People's Party (ÖVP) and the blue Freedom Party of Austria (FPÖ). Nationwide, such a coalition was first formed from February 2000 to April 2005 by the Schüssel I and Schüssel II federal governments. After the 2017 National Council elections, the ÖVP and FPÖ formed a coalition again from December 2017 to May 2019 (Kurz I federal government). At the state level, there has been a black-blue working agreement within the framework of a proportional government in Upper Austria since October 2015 (Pühringer V state government, Stelzer I state government, Stelzer II state government) and in Lower Austria since March 2023 (Mikl-Leitner III). On 24 May 2023, the Governor of Salzburg State, Wilfried Haslauer, announced the successful formation of a black-blue coalition (Haslauer Jr. third government) following the 2023 Salzburg state election.

The parties involved in Germany

CDU

AfD

In Germany, after 1919, "black-blue" electoral alliances and later coalition governments between the Centre Party (black) and Protestant liberal-conservative parties (Prussian-blue) emerged in Württemberg. In the Federal Republic, a possible cooperation between the Christian Democratic Union of Germany (CDU) (black) and the Alternative for Germany (blue) has been referred to as a black-blue coalition.

== Austria ==
In Austria, there have been black-blue coalitions between the Austrian People's Party and the Freedom Party of Austria at the state and federal levels for decades:

=== Vorarlberg ===
At the state level in Vorarlberg, there was a black-blue coalition from 1974 to 2009, although the ÖVP always achieved an absolute majority alone with one exception. A minority government coalition therefore only existed between 1999 and 2004, when the ÖVP did not have an absolute majority. Before the 2009 state election in Vorarlberg, Governor Herbert Sausgruber ruled out a continuation of the cooperation after an anti-Semitic statement by the FPÖ's top candidate Dieter Egger. In the following legislative period, the ÖVP governed alone with an absolute majority, and since losing the majority in 2014, together with The Greens. In November 2024, a black-blue coalition was formed under Governor Markus Wallner with the Fourth Wallner government.

=== Carinthia ===
In Carinthia, a proportional representation system existed until 2017. Prior to this, there had been several collaborations between the ÖVP and the FPÖ. After the SPÖ had provided the state governor for 44 years, in 1989, the People's Party's deputies elected Jörg Haider as the first FPÖ state governor. Two years later, Haider was voted out of office by a motion of no confidence due to a right-wing extremist statement, and Christof Zernatto (ÖVP) was elected with SPÖ votes. It wasn't until 18 years later that a working agreement between the Christian Democratic Union (CDU) and the Free Democratic Party (FDP) was reached again. In 2009, the FPÖ's lead candidate, Mario Canori, stated that his preferred coalition would be cooperation with the BZÖ. If these two parties did not achieve a majority, the ÖVP could also be included. After the Freedom Party in Carinthia won the 2009 state elections as part of the BZÖ and Gerhard Dörfler was elected governor with the votes of the BZÖ and ÖVP, the state group split from the BZÖ at the end of 2009 and began a cooperation with the federal FPÖ.

=== Upper Austria ===
On 23 October 2015, the Landtag of Upper Austria elected and sworn in the Pühringer V provincial government, the first government with a black-blue working agreement within the framework of a proportional government. After Josef Pühringer's departure in April 2017, the working agreement was continued within the Stelzer I state government.

=== Salzburg ===
Before the 2023 Salzburg state election, Governor Wilfried Haslauer ruled out a coalition between the ÖVP and the FPÖ. After the election, the "Dirndl Coalition" could not be continued because NEOS was no longer represented in the state parliament. A coalition between the ÖVP and The Greens failed to achieve a majority. Haslauer then considered an "Alliance for Salzburg" consisting of the ÖVP, FPÖ, and SPÖ, which, however, was rejected by the SPÖ. As a result, a coalition between the ÖVP and the FPÖ was formed. On May 26, 2023, the new Salzburg state government was the Haslauer Jr. third government, led by Wilfried Haslauer Jr., was presented to the public. The government has been in office since 14 June 2023. It is the state's first coalition government with a coalition of the ÖVP and the FPÖ. On 2 July 2025, Karoline Edtstadler was elected Governor of Salzburg in the Edtstadler government by the Landtag of Salzburg.

=== Lower Austria ===
In the 2023 Lower Austrian state election, the ÖVP lost its absolute majority. After negotiations between the ÖVP and the SPÖ to conclude a working agreement failed, talks began between the ÖVP and the FPÖ. A working agreement was presented on 17 March 2023. On 23 March 2023, the Mikl-Leitner III state government was sworn in. Johanna Mikl-Leitner was re-elected governor, and FPÖ state party leader Udo Landbauer was appointed deputy governor.

=== Styria ===
After the 2024 Styrian state election, the blue-black Kunasek State Government was formed.

=== Federal level ===
After the National Council elections on 3 October 1999, Social Democratic Chancellor Viktor Klima was unable to form a viable governing coalition. The ÖVP and FPÖ subsequently formed a coalition. Both parties had received the same number of seats in the National Council, with the FPÖ under Jörg Haider receiving about 400 votes (0.01%) more than the ÖVP. This coalition was therefore occasionally referred to as "Blue-Black." The ÖVP provided the Federal Chancellor and half of the ministerial posts; the FPÖ received the office of Vice Chancellor and important ministerial posts, such as the Ministries of Finance, Social Affairs, Justice, and National Defense. On 4 February 2000, the First Schüssel government was sworn in by Federal President Thomas Klestil.

The black-blue coalition led by Wolfgang Schüssel was the first of its kind at the federal level and ended the grand coalition between the ÖVP and SPÖ after 13 years. Haider himself was not part of this government, but remained governor of Carinthia.

After the early parliamentary elections on 24 November 2002, in which the ÖVP became the strongest party for the first time since 1966 and the FPÖ suffered a massive loss of votes, the coalition between the ÖVP and FPÖ was ultimately continued (the Schüssel II federal government). After the FPÖ split on 4 April 2005, into the former FPÖ and Haider's BZÖ, the BZÖ continued its governing alliance with the ÖVP. Due to the BZÖ's orange party color, the coalition was referred to as a black–orange coalition.

The government implemented numerous reforms, but encountered some fierce opposition. It was controversially debated for years, while the conservative side emphasized the numerous reform agendas and called Schüssel a "change-making chancellor ." International opposition was also strong (see also EU-14 sanctions against Austria).

As was later revealed, numerous political scandals surrounding corruption occurred during the black-blue government period, in which FPÖ government members were particularly involved, including the homepage affair, Casinos Affair, BUWOG Affair, Terminal Tower and Tetron Affair, Eurofighter affair and the Telekom Austria Affair.

Before the 2008 Austrian legislative election, the ÖVP's top candidate, Wilhelm Molterer, did not explicitly reject a coalition government with the blue coalition, but cooperation was considered difficult due to significant differences on European and social policy issues. FPÖ candidate Heinz-Christian Strache repeatedly accused the People's Party of "social icebox politics" and made no secret of seeing more common ground with the SPÖ.

After the 2013 Austrian legislative election, the Black-Blue coalition did not have a majority. This would have been achieved only by including Team Stronach. A grand coalition was ultimately formed again .

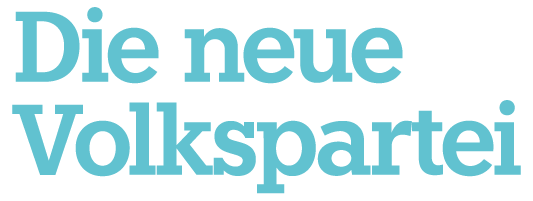
Logo of the ÖVP (2017–2022)

Following the 2017 Austrian legislative election, in which the ÖVP emerged as the strongest party, Sebastian Kurz entered into coalition negotiations with the FPÖ. The formation of a turquoise-blue government (a change of the ÖVP's party color at the federal level) had already been considered possible before the election. On 15 December 2017, Kurz and Strache announced an agreement on a coalition government. The first Kurz government was appointed on 18 December 2017.

As a result of the Ibiza affair, Vice Chancellor Heinz-Christian Strache resigned from his government office on 18 May 2019, and simultaneously resigned as party leader of the FPÖ. Parliamentary group leader Johann Gudenus also resigned. Chancellor Kurz then announced new elections and simultaneously announced that he intended to propose to the Federal President the dismissal of Interior Minister Herbert Kickl. As a result, all FPÖ ministers resigned, thus ending the coalition. The Kurz government, which had also included experts since 22 May 2019, but no longer held a majority in parliament, was voted out of office on 27 May 2019, by a motion of no confidence with the votes of the SPÖ, FPÖ, and JETZT parliamentary groups. Following the National Council elections on 29 September 2019, a coalition between the ÖVP and the Greens was formed.

== Germany ==
During the German Empire and the Weimar Republic, the Catholic-dominated Centre Party was designated by the color "black." In Württemberg, after 1900, "black-blue" electoral alliances and later coalition governments between the Center and Protestant liberal-conservative parties (Prussian-blue) emerged.

In Germany, there is speculation about majorities in the form of a collaboration between the conservative Union (black) and the far-right Alternative for Germany (blue). Including the Free Democratic Party (FDP), there is also talk of a black-blue-yellow "Bahamas coalition." In some federal states, the mathematical majority for this would already exist (namely in Saxony-Anhalt, North Rhine-Westphalia (with FDP), Bavaria, Hesse, Saxony, and Thuringia – listed according to the age of the last state election result). Since the 2017 German federal election, a black-blue-yellow coalition at the federal level would also have such a majority. Politically, this form of cooperation is promoted by the AfD. The CDU, on the other hand, categorically rules out a coalition with the AfD, as the AfD is considered "certainly right-wing extremist" in several federal states.

Due to the cordon sanitaire (usually called firewall, or Brandmauer in Germany) all other parties have established against AfD, hypothetical coalitions involving the AfD are rarely discussed. A coalition of CDU/CSU, AfD, and FDP would have had a majority in the 20th Bundestag elected in 2021; (Note: Prior to the repeat election in Berlin, 369 seats were needed for a majority. CDU/CSU 197, FDP 92, AfD 83, total 372 seats.) it was not seriously discussed publicly by either media or politicians due to the cordon sanitaire. This hypothetical coalition has been described as the "Bahamas coalition", in reference to the colors of the flag of the Bahamas, as early as 2013. Following the 2019 Thuringian state election, the election of Thomas Kemmerich by members of the three parties sparked the 2020 Thuringian government crisis, which ultimately led to Kemmerich's resignation. (Note: 46 seats needed for a majority (AfD 22, CDU 21, FDP 5). Total 48 seats, of which 45 voted for Kemmerich in the plurality vote.) A hypothetical coalition involving CDU/CSU and AfD would have a majority in several Landtag elections. It is referred to as a "black–blue coalition" or "midnight coalition".

| State parliament | Election year | Majority required | CDU/CSU seats | AfD seats | Black–blue total |
|---|---|---|---|---|---|
| Saxony | 2014 | 64 | 59 | 14 | 73 |
| Saxony-Anhalt | 2016 | 44 | 30 | 25 | 55 |
| Saarland | 2017 | 26 | 24 | 3 | 27 |
| Bavaria | 2018 | 103 | 85 | 22 | 107 |
| Saxony | 2019 | 60 | 45 | 38 | 83 |
| Saxony-Anhalt | 2021 | 49 | 40 | 23 | 63 |
| Bavaria | 2023 | 102 | 85 | 32 | 117 |
| Hesse | 2023 | 67 | 52 | 28 | 80 |
| Saxony | 2024 | 61 | 41 | 40 | 81 |
| Thuringia | 2024 | 45 | 23 | 32 | 55 |

Such a coalition would have had a majority in the 21st Bundestag elected in 2025, the two parties having a total of 360 out of 630 seats; (Note: 316 seats needed for a majority. CDU/CSU 208, AfD 152.) before and after the 2025 German federal election, held on 23 February, the CDU and CSU rejected this due to the cordon sanitaire. Other coalitions involving the AfD are considered even more unlikely due to ideological differences and a lack of parliamentary majorities.

== Literature ==
- Emmerich Tálos: Schwarz-Blau – eine Bilanz des „Neu-Regierens“, Wien 2006, ISBN 3-7000-0516-4
- Cathrin Pichler, Roman Berka, Hrsg.: TransAct. Transnational Activities in the Cultural Field. Interventionen zur Lage in Österreich. museum in progress, Edition Transfer bei Springer Wien New York 2010, ISBN 978-3-211-99800-7
- Kulturrisse (Zeitschrift für radikaldemokratische Kulturpolitik): Die intellektuelle Konterrevolution, Ausgabe 00/2000, Wien 2000
