= Georg H. Jeitler =

Austrian entrepreneur

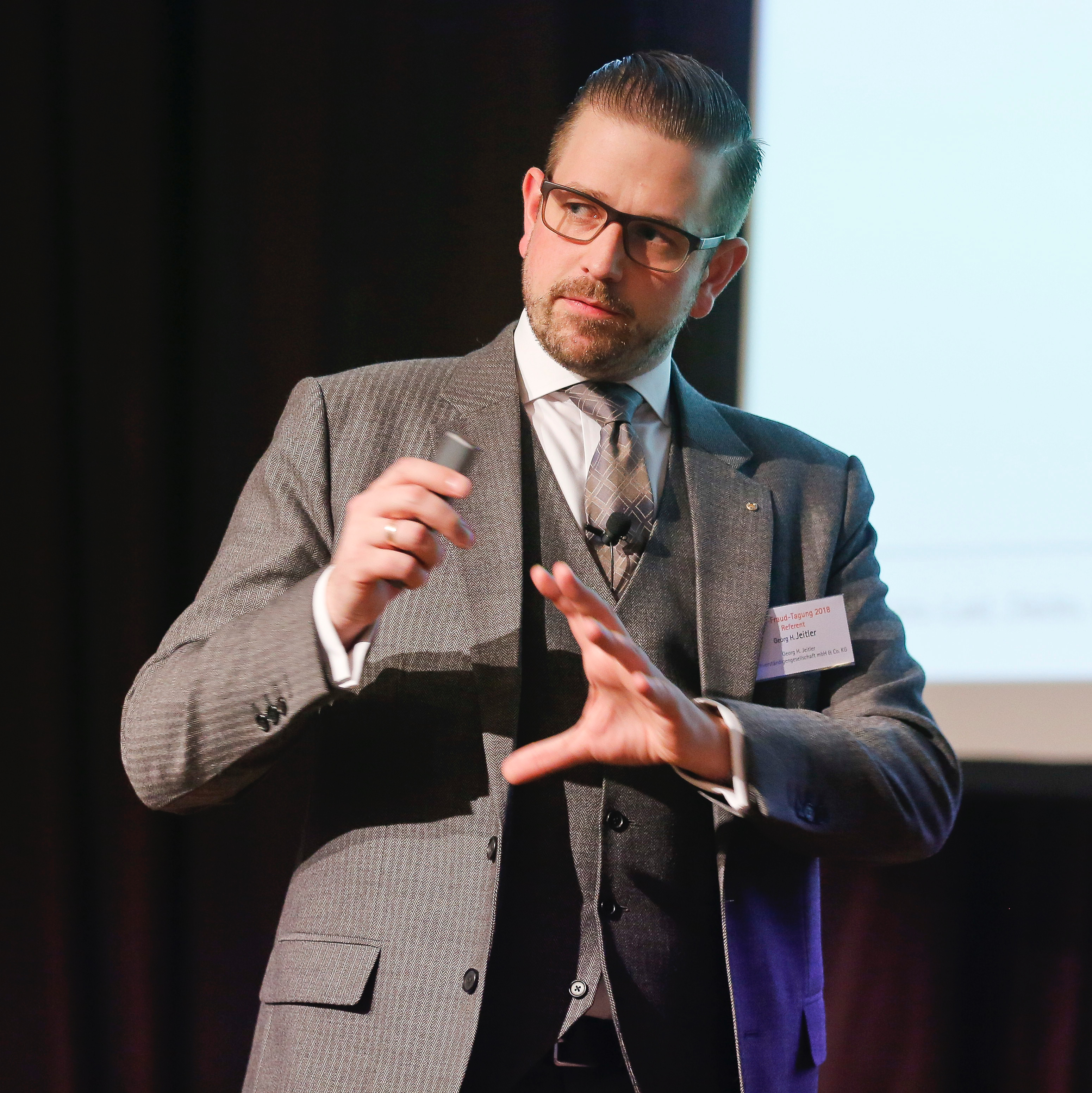
- Georg Jeitler at the 9th DIIR Anti Fraud Management conference in Düsseldorf, 2018
- Born: Georg Hans Jeitler; September 27, 1979 (age 45); Vienna, Austria
- Education: Master of Business Administration
- Alma mater: University of Vienna; University of Applied Sciences Burgenland
- Occupation(s): businessperson, business consultant, forensic economist
- Years active: 2000–
- Known for: Tetron Affair; Telekom Austria Affair; Mediaselect Affair; Carinthia Brochure Affair
- Spouse: Carmen Jeitler-Cincelli

Georg Hans Jeitler (born 27 September 1979), also referred as Georg H. Jeitler, is an Austrian entrepreneur, lecturer and forensic economist based in Vienna, Austria. He has served as a judiciary's expert witness and investigator in several Austrian corruption scandals including Telekom Austria Affair and Tetron Affair. He is vice president of the Austrian Court Experts’ Association.

== Early life and education ==
Jeitler was born in Vienna, Austria, in 1979. He attended University of Vienna where he received his Bachelor's and Master's degree in communication science. Later, he attended the Austrian Institute of Management at the University of Applied Sciences, Burgenland and received his MBA degree in Management Consultancy. Jeitler is a certified management consultant and a certified expert witness.

== Career ==
In 2000, Jeitler established an advertising agency. Over the years, his focus shifted towards communications consultancy and business advisory which ultimately led to specializing in business compliance topics. Since 2011, Jeitler has served as an expert witness in a large number cases for the Austrian judiciary and private clients. His work as an expert witness has been subject to news coverage of several Austrian political affairs.

In 2019, Jeitler became a partner at Grant Thornton Austria in the field of forensic practice. In 2024, he was appointed as the firm's head of Advisory. The same year, he was elected 2nd Vice President of the Austrian Court Experts' Association, State Association for Vienna, Lower Austria and Burgenland.

=== Notable expert witness work ===
==== Telekom Austria Affair ====
The Telekom Austria affair is one of the major party donations' scandals in Austrian politics history. Jeitler’s work led to the conviction of several Austrian politicians and business persons, most notably Gernot Rumpold. In 2004, Rumpold’s marketing and PR firm "mediaConnection" had sold four business concepts to Telekom Austria for EUR 600,000. Jeitler proved that these concepts were of no use, and, therefore, worth significantly less than what Telekom Austria had paid for them. This made it evident that the business concepts were sold to cover an illegal party donation to the right-wing party FPÖ. The court sentenced Rumpold, besides other defendants, to three years in prison without parole.

==== Carinthia Brochure Affair ====
During the 2009 state parliament election campaign, the State of Carinthia issued a EUR 400,000 image brochure. It was suspected that this brochure was made so that it would not advertise the State of Carinthia but the political party BZÖ (originated from FPÖ) instead. Eventually, this led to indictment of several BZÖ politicians, including Carinthia’s then governor Gerhard Dörfler. Jeitler empirically proved to the court that the advertising brochure was indeed primarily advertising the BZÖ, and not the state of Carinthia.

==== Tetron Affair ====
The Austrian police, fire brigade, and emergency medical service sought to introduce a standardized digital radio system in 2004. The Tetron consortium (Motorola, Alcatel, Telekom Austria) was eventually chosen to develop this system. In investigation proceedings and later in a 2014/2015 court case, Jeitler proved that, in 2008, Alfons Mensdorff-Pouilly had received a bribe payment of EUR 1.1 million from Rudolf Fischer, then chairman of Telekom Austria. Lobbyist Mensdorff-Pouilly had made the interior ministry choose Tetron for the new radio system. Mensdorff-Pouilly was sentenced to three years in prison without parole.

==== Mediaselect Affair ====
In 2012, the Austrian judiciary investigated suspicions of obfuscated party donations to the christian-conservative ÖVP. From 2002 until 2008, Austrian companies seemed to have donated to the ÖVP through the media agency Mediaselect. In 2013, Georg Jeitler was appointed as judicial expert witness in investigation proceedings. The defendants were incriminated by Jeitler’s findings that billed services had not been rendered at arm’s length and had no value in return.

== Personal life ==
Jeitler was married to an Austrian Member of Parliament, Carmen Jeitler-Cincelli, with three children. The couple allegedly separated in 2023. He resides in Baden bei Wien.

The eldest son of the couple, Moriz, is active in students government and an elected member of the Federal representation, the national parliament of the Austrian Students' Association.
