= Jeitler =

Jeitler is a surname. Notable people with the surname include:

- Georg H. Jeitler (born 1979), Austrian entrepreneur and forensic scientist
- Carmen Jeitler-Cincelli (born 1980), Austrian entrepreneur and politician

== See also ==
- Zeitler
