= Johann Baptist Gudenus =

Austrian sprinter and bobsledder

Personal information
- Full name: Johann Baptist Theodor Franz de Paula Philipp Maria von Gudenus
- Nationality: Austrian
- Born: 11 June 1908 Vestenötting, Austria-Hungary
- Died: 10 February 1968 (aged 59) Vienna, Austria

Sport
- Sport: Bobsleigh

Johann Baptist Theodor Gudenus or Johann Baptist, Graf von Gudenus (11 June 1908 – 10 February 1968) was an Austrian sprinter and bobsledder who competed in the 1930s.

== Early life ==
Johann Baptist Theodor Franz de Paula Philipp Maria was born into the noble Gudenus family, as the younger son of Philipp Friedrich Gabriel Heinrich Maria, Graf von Gudenus (1877-1948) and his wife, Angela Hardt (1880-1973). His paternal grandparents were Count Heinrich Johann Baptist Ghislain von Gudenus (1839-1915) and Countess Ernestine of Thun und Hohenstein (1853-1910).

== Career ==
At the 1932 Winter Olympics in Lake Placid, New York, he finished 12th and last in the two-man event. Four years later he finished 13th in the four-man event at the 1936 Winter Olympics.

Competing at the 1936 Summer Olympics in Berlin, he was eliminated in the first round of the 400 metres competition.

== Personal life ==
On 26 June 1939 he was married to Karin Giaver (1905-1980). They had one son and one daughter:

- John, Graf von Gudenus (1940-2016); Austrian politician and father of:
  - Johann Baptist Björn, Graf von Gudenus (b. 1976); Austrian politician involved in the "Ibiza affair"
- Sigrid Elisabeth Angela, Gräfin von Gudenus (b. 1943), married to Alexander Roth-Pollack-Parnau (b. 1935)

== See also ==
- List of athletes who competed in both the Summer and Winter Olympic games
