= Gudenus =

Family name

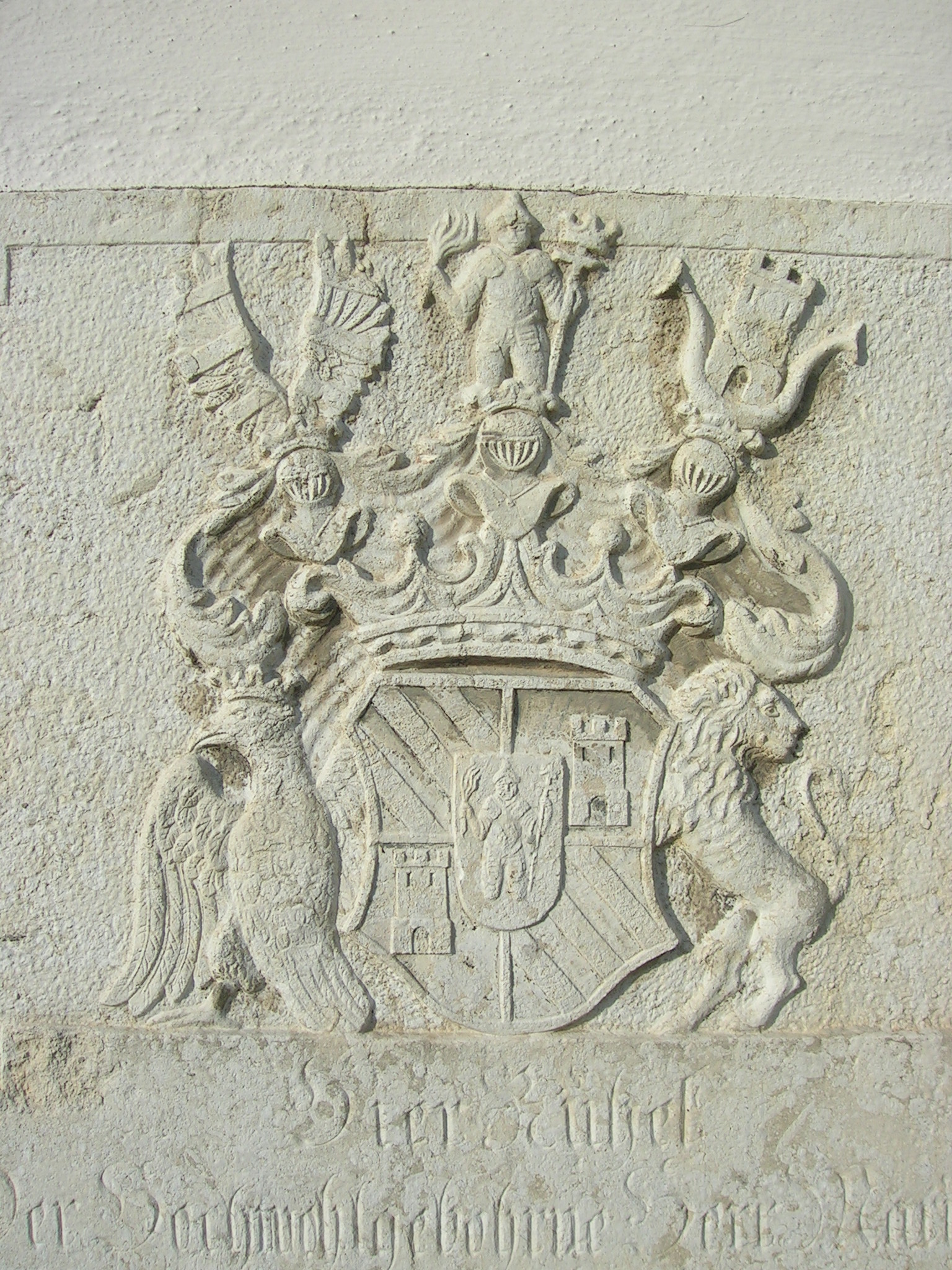
Coat of Arms of the Gudenus family (18th century)

The Gudenus family is a prominent German noble family, originating in Hesse, whose noble ancestry can be traced back to the 16th century.

== History ==
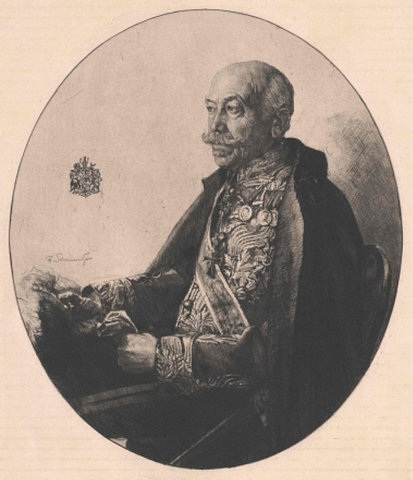
Count Leopold Gabriel Ludwig Ghislain von Gudenus

Since 1774, the family ruled the Lordship of Umpfenbach, which they had acquired from the Castell-Remlingen branch of the Castell family. Holding Imperial Immediacy, the estate was eventually sold in 1805 to the House of Trauttmansdorff. Throughout centuries, the Gudenus family was divided into two lines, one comital and one baronial. The first line, which held the title of Count, granted to them on 22 October 1907 by Franz Joseph I, settled in Austria, while the other line of the family, which held the title of Baron, granted to them on 15 April 1756, settled in the Duchy of Styria and Kingdom of Hungary.

== Notable members ==
- Moritz Gudenus (1596-1680), German Catholic preacher and progenitor of the Gudenus family
- Leopold, Graf von Gudenus (1843-1913), Great Chamberlain of Austro-Hungarian Empire
- Johann Baptist, Graf von Gudenus (1908–1968), Austrian sprinter and bobsledder
- John, Graf von Gudenus (1940–2016), Austrian politician and member of the Federal Council of Austria
- Johann, Graf von Gudenus (b. 1976), Austrian politician involved in the "Ibiza affair"
