= VIVO! Cluj-Napoca =

Shopping mall in Cluj County, Romania

VIVO! Cluj
- Location: Florești, Romania
- Opened: 12 October 2007
- Owner: Immofinanz
- Floor area: 62,884 m^{2} (676,880 sq ft)

VIVO! Cluj-Napoca is a shopping mall located in Florești, Romania, which opened on October 12, 2007, having the name of Polus Center Cluj. At the time of its completion it was the first shopping mall in Florești. It took 15 months to build Polus Center, and for nine months the construction site was also the biggest archaeological site in Romania. Among the finds was the tomb of a Gepid princess and a 3300-year-old tomb of a pair of lovers.

The centre has a total leasable surface of 62,884 m^{2} (676,880 sq ft). Current stores include Zara, Bershka, Pull&Bear, Aldo, InMedio, Intersport, Piazza Italia, Kenvelo, New Yorker, Media Galaxy, Sony, Accessorize, Debenhams and Marks & Spencer, as well as an 8,000 square meters Carrefour hypermarket and a pet-shop. The centre also includes a paintball court, a skating rink, a karting circuit, a football pitch and several cinemas, as well as playgrounds for children. Polus also houses six bank agencies and a post office, as well as a number of restaurants.

In 2016, Polus Center Cluj was rebranded as VIVO! Cluj-Napoca by its new owners Immofinanz.
