= Corruption in Austria =

Corruption in Austria describes the prevention and occurrence of corruption in Austria. Austria has a well-developed institutional and legal system, and most corruption cases under investigation by a parliamentary committee end with judicial trials and effective judgments. However, there are several significant Austrian corruption cases which have taken place during the past decade involving land and regional officials, high-level public officials, the central government and, in one instance, the former Chancellor.

On Transparency International's 2025 Corruption Perceptions Index, Austria scored 69 on a scale from 0 ("highly corrupt") to 100 ("very clean"). When Transparency International began using its current scoring method in 2012, Austria's score was also 69 for the first two years, climbed steadily to scores of 75-77 through 2015-2020, and since then has returned to 69. When ranked by score in 2025, Austria ranked 21st among the 182 countries in the Index, where the country ranked first is perceived to have the most honest public sector. For comparison with regional scores, the best score among Western European and European Union countries (Note: Austria, Belgium, Bulgaria, Croatia, Cyprus, Czechia, Denmark, Estonia, Finland, France, Germany, Greece, Hungary, Iceland, Ireland, Italy, Latvia, Lithuania, Luxembourg, Malta, Netherlands, Norway, Poland, Portugal, Romania, Slovakia, Slovenia, Spain, Sweden, Switzerland, and the United Kingdom.) was 89, the average score was 64 and the worst score was 40. For comparison with worldwide scores, the best score was 89 (ranked 1), the average score was 42, and the worst score was 9 (ranked 181, in a two-way tie).

In most cases, corrupt practices were related to conflicts of interest, abuse of office, money laundering and influence peddling. The corruption scandals have put into doubt the ethical standards of the political elite. This doubt is reflected in the findings of Eurobarometer 2012, where two-thirds of respondents perceive national politicians to be corrupt and also the most corrupt institution in Austria.

== Extent ==
According to several sources, corruption is not considered a problem for doing business in Austria. According to Investment Climate Report 2013 by the US Department of State 2013, corruption is not considered as a serious problem impeding business in Austria.

A study over the years 2013 to 2019 found that Austria had the highest rate of corruption in healthcare of all EU countries, with one in nine Austrian patients being asked to pay bribes.

== Affairs in recent history ==
The following corruption complexes caused a great public and media stir in Austria's recent history, mainly due to the involvement of political functionaries:

- AKH-Skandal (AKH Affair), surfacing 1980, which revolved around the construction of Austria's largest hospital, the Wiener Allgemeines Krankenhaus (Vienna General Hospital) in the 1970s.
- Noricum-Skandal (Noricum scandal) was an Austrian arms export scandal centering on the illegal export of weapons to Iran during the 1980s.
- Eurofighter-Affäre (Eurofighter Affair), surfacing 2006, is referring to a procurement process for fighter jets.
- BUWOG-Affäre (BUWOG Affair), surfacing 2009, which originated from a 2003 privatisation process around a large housing portfolio owned by the Republic of Austria.
- Hypo Alpe Adria, a complex of mismanagement and suspected corruption around a former state bank, surfacing 2009.
- Telekom-Affäre (Telekom Austria Affair), surfacing 2011, included share price manipulation, unauthorised election campaign donations, influencing the awarding of contracts, questionable sponsoring and unclear company takeovers between 2000 and 2007.
- Tetron-Affäre (Tetron Affair), surfacing 2011, involves possible money laundering, illegal lobbying, party financing and commission payments in connection with the procurement of a new federal digital radio systems for authorities and emergency forces in the early 2000s.
- Ibiza-Affäre (Ibiza Affair), which was triggered 2019 by the publication of a 2017 secretly recorded video of the Austrian Vice Chancellor.

== See also ==
- Crime in Austria
- Police corruption in Austria
