= Moritz Gudenus =

Moritz Gudenus (11 April 1596, Cassel — February 1680, Treffurt) was a German Catholic preacher and a convert to the Catholic faith from the Protestant ministry.

== Biography ==
Gudenus was a descendant of a Calvinist Gudenus family which had removed from Utrecht to Hesse. After attending school at Cassel he continued his studies at the University of Marburg, in which city he subsequently acted as deacon of the reformed church. He had held this position for less than two years, when a change of civil rulers resulted in the official substitution of Lutheranism for Calvinism at Marburg. Gudenus lost his office because of his refusal to adopt the Augsburg Confession. He returned to Cassel, was appointed assistant at Abterode, and in 1625 became pastor there.

The reading of Bellarmine's works revealed to him the Catholic doctrine in its true light, and after careful study he and his family were received into the Church in 1630. The conversion was made at the cost of considerable personal sacrifices. After a time of need and trials Gudenus was named high bailiff at Treffurt, a position which he held until his death.

His funeral panegyric was delivered by Herwig Boning, representative of the Archbishop of Mainz in the district of Eichsfeld and parish priest of Duderstadt. Boning included the panegyric in his edition of the works of Gudenus, which comprised a treatise on the Eucharist and two letters on the history of his conversion, one addressed to the Jesuits of Heiligenstadt, the other to his brother-in-law, Dr. Paul Stein: "Mensa Neophyti septem panibus instructa a cl. viro Dno. Mauritio Gudeno, electorali Moguntino praefecto in Trefurt p.m. sive ejusdem de sua ad fidem romano-catholicam conversione et divina erga se providentia narratio" (Duderstadt, 1686). Gudenus was survived by five sons, some of whom achieved distinction in ecclesiastical and academic circles. John Daniel became Auxiliary Bishop of Mainz; John Maurice, electoral and imperial counsellor and praetor at Erfurt, wrote a history of that city, "Historia Erfurtensis" (Duderstadt, 1675); Dr. John Christopher, who was diplomatic representative of the Archdiocese of Mainz at Vienna, and Dr. Urban Ferdinand, who occupied a university chair, became the founders of the two noble branches of the Gudenus family, which still flourish in Austria.

== Personal life ==
On 24 February 1623 he married Beata Stein (1602–1661). They had two sons:

- Johann Christoph, Reichsfreiherr und Edler Herr von Gudenus (1632–1705), progenitor of the elder line of the family
- Prof. Dr. med. Urban Ferdinand Gudenus (1634–1699), progenitor of the younger branch of Gudenus family

== Sources ==
RASS, Convertiten, V (Freiburg, 1867), 366–81; BINDER in Kirchenlex., s. v.; Universal Lexikom, XI (Halle and Leipzig, 1735), 1212–13; KNESCHKE, Neues Allg. Deutsch. Adels-Lexikon, IV (Leipzig, 1863), 86–87.
