= Trumau =

- Municipality
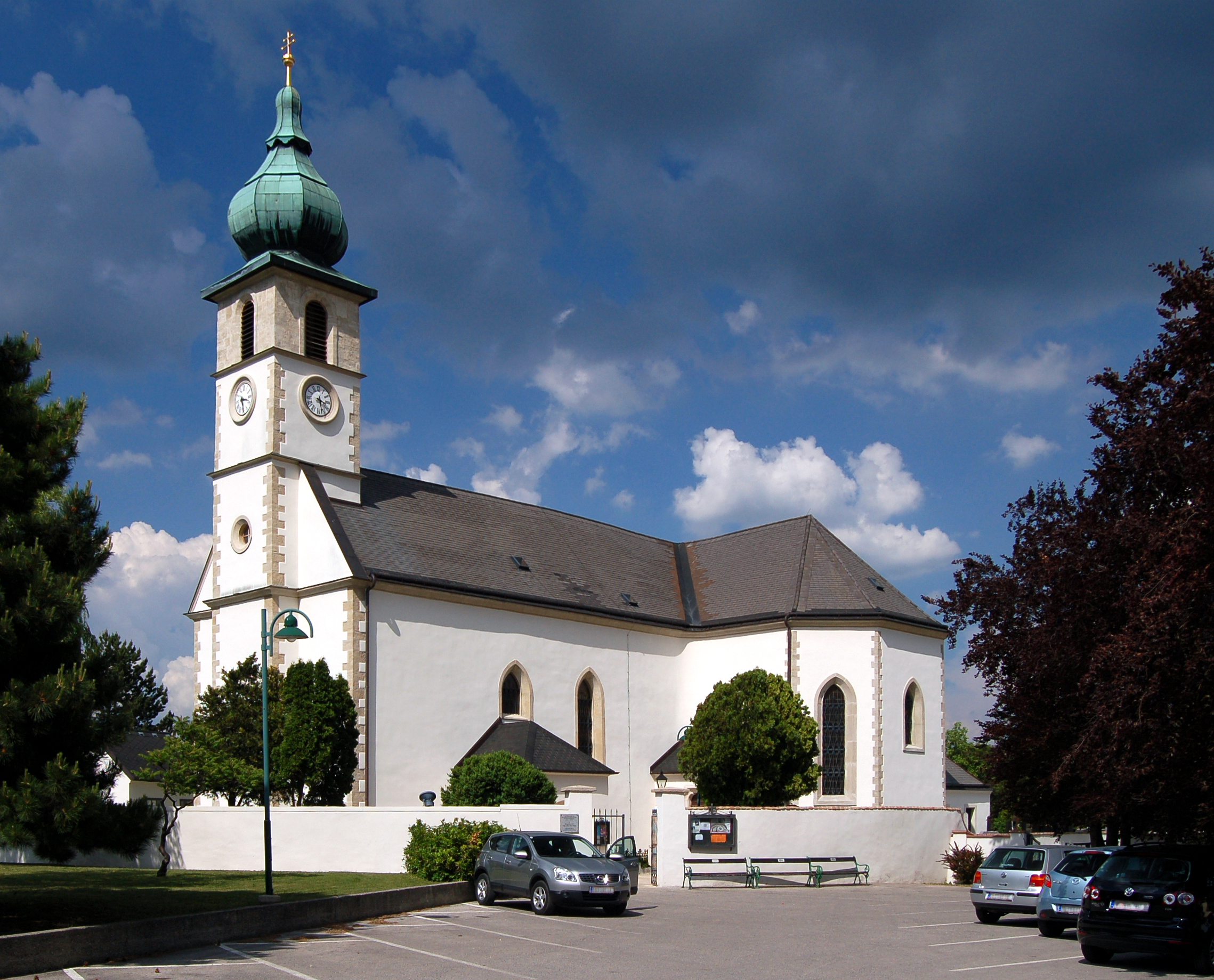
- Parish church of Trumau

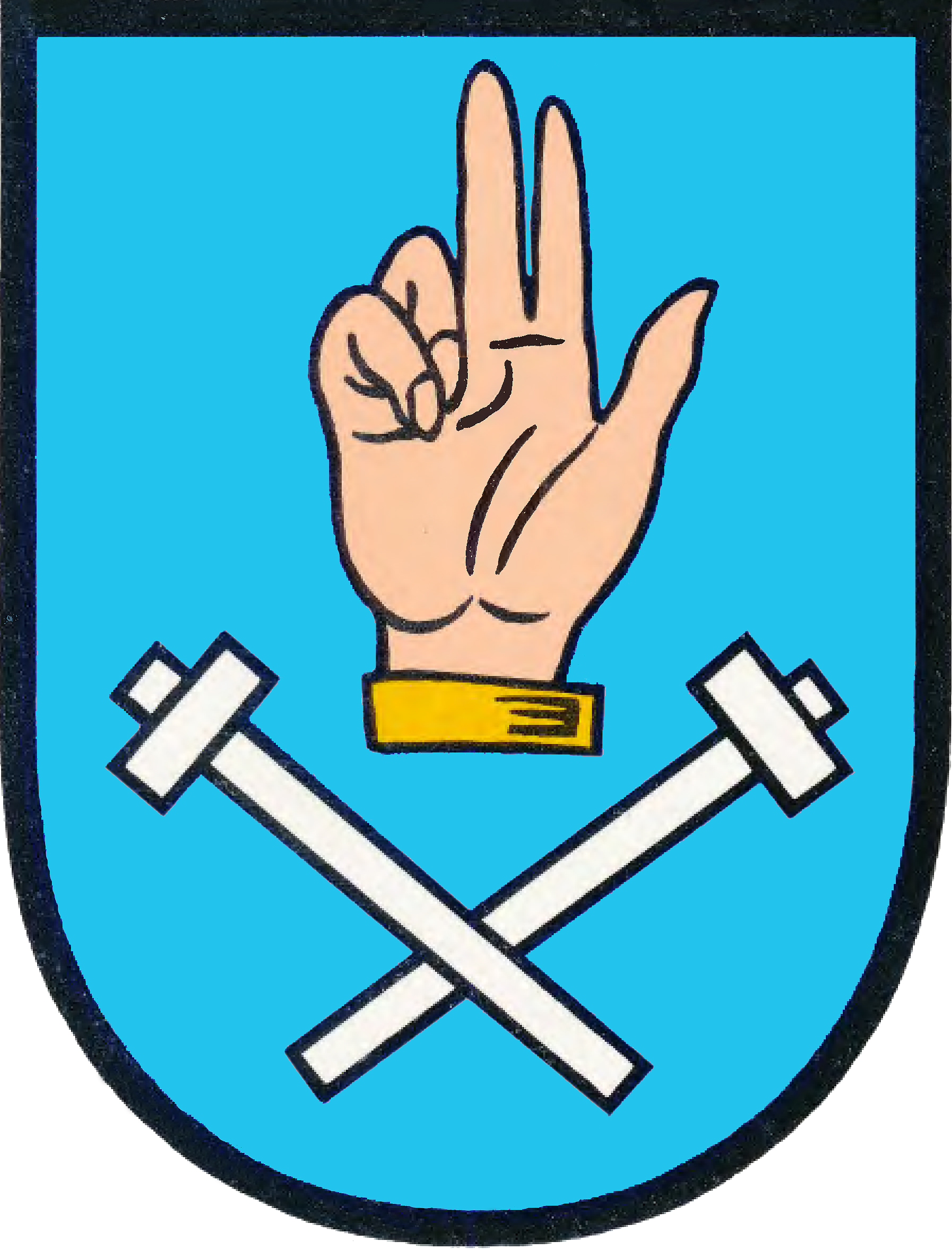
- Coat of arms

- Location within Austria
- Coordinates: 48°0′N 16°21′E
- Country: Austria
- State: Lower Austria
- District: Baden

Government
  - Mayor: Andreas Kollross

Area
  - Total: 18.58 km^{2} (7.17 sq mi)
- Elevation: 202 m (663 ft)

Population (2018-01-01)
  - Total: 3,640
  - Density: 196/km^{2} (507/sq mi)
- Time zone: UTC+1 (CET)
  - Summer (DST): UTC+2 (CEST)
- Postal code: 2521
- Area code: 02253
- Website: www.trumau.at

Trumau is a town in the district of Baden in Lower Austria in Austria.

== Geography ==
The river Triesting runs through the market town of Trumau. The town is situated between the south-west and north-east part of the Wiener Becken, on a sea level of 202 m. Trumau spreads over 18,57 km^{2} and houses 3465 inhabitants.

== History ==
The town was founded during the late Middle Ages, as a gift from the Babenberger Leopold IV to the Heiligenkreuz monastery.

=== Town name ===
The middle high German word ‚drum’ means endpiece. In the case of Trumau it could mean the end of the meadowlands. In ancient documents, Trumau appears in the following versions: between 1137 and 1340: Trumowe, 1139 Drumau, 1178 Drumawe, between 1233 and 1294 Drumowe, between 1303 and 1306 Drumbuowe, 1340 Drumenaw, 1380 Drumpnaw, 1388 Drumpnow, 1463 Thrumbaw.

== Population ==
Historical population
Year	Pop.	±%
1971	1,880	—
1981	1,933	+2.8%
1991	2,199	+13.8%
2001	2,507	+14.0%
2011	3,332	+32.9%

== Culture and Sights ==
=== Parish church ===
For more than 840 years, there has been a connection between the parish church of Trumau and the Cistercian Abbey of Heiligenkreuz. In the course of the counter-reformation, Emperor Rudolph II and Bishop Urban got the approval of Abbot Udalricus Molitor to build the parish church of Trumau in 1583. They agreed on the patronage one year later. At this time the parish of Trumau was under the control of the parish Traiskirchen, which was incorporated with Melk Abbey. The abbot of Heiligenkreuz arranged the construction of the church, which was then built by "Maister Andre Stuber" of Baden. The work of the chisellers was carried out by the Italian brothers Elias and Alexius Payos, who were masters in this kind of work, from the monastery's own delf. The church was finished under Abbot Johannes Rueff, and it was consecrated by Bishop Hector Wegmann of Passau on 22 February 1588. John the Baptist is the parish's patron saint.

=== Castle ===
The castle of Trumau is a moated castle. From the beginning it has been in the ownership of Heiligenkreuz Abbey. The castle was a present from the Babenberg's Margrave Leopold IV. in 1138. In the 12th century, a grange was built by the Cistercians at the place where the castle stands today. The abbey managed agriculture, viniculture, and sheep-breeding there. Towards the end of the first Austrian Ottoman War, the courtyard was rebuilt from 1548 to 1558 because the estate had been totally destroyed in 1548. The building was burnt down by Hungarian rebels in 1621. In 1650, abbot Michael Schnabel arranged the rebuilding to a castle, which was finished in 1667. Emperor Leopold I. overnighted several times at Castle Trumau.

During the fifth Austrian Ottoman War, the castle was heavily damaged in 1683. In course of the rebuilding, the towers were gravely changed. Further fires like in 1811 and 1880 damaged the castle.

In 2009, the International Theological Institute moved into the castle Trumau.

== Literature ==
- Hermann Watzl: Schloss Trumau. Seine Baugeschichte. Heiligenkreuzer-Verlag, Heiligenkreuz 1964.
- * Kurt Janetschek: Trumau im Wandel der Zeit. Eine Chronik, verfaßt anläßlich der Markterhebung am 4. Juni 1972. Marktgemeinde Trumau, Trumau 1972.
- Georg Dehio, Peter Aichinger-Rosenberger (eds.): Niederösterreich südlich der Donau (Handbuch der Kunstdenkmäler Östrerreichs). Verlag Berger, Wien 2003, ISBN 3-85028-365-8.
- Felix Halmer: Burgen und Schlösser zwischen Baden, Gutenstein und Wr. Neustadt. Wien: Birken-Verlag 1968 (Niederösterreich/1; Vol. 2).
- C. Martinic: Österreichisches Burgenlexikon. Linz: Landesverlag 1992, ISBN 3-85214-559-7.
- Gerhard Stenzel: Von Schloß zu Schloß in Österreich. Wien: Kremayer & Scheriau 1976, ISBN 3-218-00288-5.
- Schloss Trumau on Burgenkunde.at
- Municipal data of Trumau. In: Statistik Austria.
- noel.gv.at Municipal data, Statistics and Mandatory distribution
