= Thermenregion (National Council electoral district) =

Parliamentary electoral district in Austria

- Electoral District for the National Council
- Location of Thermenregion within Austria
- District: List: Baden; Mödling
- State: Lower Austria
- Population: 271,467 (2024)
- Electorate: 197,030 (2019)
- Area: 1,030 km^{2} (2023)

Current Electoral District
- Created: 2017
- Seats: List: 6 (2024–present); 5 (2017–2024)
- Members: List: Hans Stefan Hintner (ÖVP); Carmen Jeitler-Cincelli (ÖVP); Andreas Kollross (SPÖ)
- Created from: List: Greater Vienna; Lower Austria South East

Thermenregion, also known as Electoral District 3F (German: Wahlkreis 3F), is one of the 39 multi-member regional electoral districts of the National Council, the lower house of the Austrian Parliament, the national legislature of Austria. The electoral district was established in 2016 from parts of Greater Vienna and Lower Austria South East following the re-organisation of the regional electoral districts in Lower Austria to reflect the new administrative district structure and came into being at the following legislative election in 2017. It consists of the districts of Baden and Mödling in the state of Lower Austria. The electoral district currently elects six of the 183 members of the National Council using the open party-list proportional representation electoral system. At the 2019 legislative election the constituency had 197,030 registered electors.

== History ==
Thermenregion was established in 2016 from parts of Greater Vienna and Lower Austria South East following the re-organisation of the regional electoral districts in Lower Austria to reflect the new administrative district structure. It consisted of the districts of Baden and Mödling in the state of Lower Austria. The district was initially allocated five seats in February 2017. Electoral regulations require the allocation of seats amongst the electoral districts to be recalculated following each national census and in June 2023 the number of seats allocated to Thermenregion was increased to six based on the population as at the 2021 national census.

== Electoral system ==
Thermenregion currently elects six of the 183 members of the National Council using the open party-list proportional representation electoral system. The allocation of seats is carried out in three stages. In the first stage, seats are allocated to parties (lists) at the regional level using a state-wide Hare quota (wahlzahl) (valid votes in the state divided by the number of seats in the state). In the second stage, seats are allocated to parties at the state/provincial level using the state-wide Hare quota (any seats won by the party at the regional stage are subtracted from the party's state seats). In the third and final stage, seats are allocated to parties at the federal/national level using the D'Hondt method (any seats won by the party at the regional and state stages are subtracted from the party's federal seats). Only parties that reach the 4% national threshold, or have won a seat at the regional stage, compete for seats at the state and federal stages.

Electors may cast one preferential vote for individual candidates at the regional, state and federal levels. Split-ticket voting (panachage), or voting for more than one candidate at each level, is not permitted and will result in the ballot paper being invalidated. At the regional level, candidates must receive preferential votes amounting to at least 14% of the valid votes cast for their party to over-ride the order of the party list (10% and 7% respectively for the state and federal levels).

== Election results ==
=== Summary ===
Election	Communists KPÖ+ / KPÖ			Social Democrats SPÖ			Greens GRÜNE			NEOS NEOS / LiF			People's ÖVP			Freedom FPÖ		
Election	Votes	%	Seats	Votes	%	Seats	Votes	%	Seats	Votes	%	Seats	Votes	%	Seats	Votes	%	Seats
2019	839	0.54%	0	32,309	20.60%	1	22,625	14.43%	0	17,225	10.98%	0	56,373	35.95%	2	23,223	14.81%	0
2017	1,011	0.62%	0	44,068	26.86%	1	5,916	3.61%	0	11,321	6.90%	0	51,890	31.63%	1	38,326	23.36%	1

=== Detailed ===
==== 2019 ====
Results of the 2019 legislative election held on 29 September 2019:

Party		Votes per district			Total votes	%	Seats
Party		Baden	Möd- ling	Voting card	Total votes	%	Seats
Austrian People's Party	ÖVP	29,345	26,750	278	56,373	35.95%	2
Social Democratic Party of Austria	SPÖ	19,269	12,882	158	32,309	20.60%	1
Freedom Party of Austria	FPÖ	14,303	8,765	155	23,223	14.81%	0
The Greens	GRÜNE	10,100	12,304	221	22,625	14.43%	0
NEOS	NEOS	7,256	9,771	198	17,225	10.98%	0
JETZT	JETZT	1,752	1,689	24	3,465	2.21%	0
KPÖ Plus	KPÖ+	466	367	6	839	0.54%	0
Der Wandel	WANDL	385	370	5	760	0.48%	0
Valid Votes		82,876	72,898	1,045	156,819	100.00%	3
Rejected Votes		1,088	582	7	1,677	1.06%	
Total Polled		83,964	73,480	1,052	158,496	80.44%	
Registered Electors		107,228	89,802		197,030		
Turnout		78.30%	81.82%		80.44%		

The following candidates were elected:

- Party mandates - Hans Stefan Hintner (ÖVP), 2,416 votes; Carmen Jeitler-Cincelli (ÖVP), 3,820 votes; and Andreas Kollross (SPÖ), 3,396 votes.

==== 2017 ====
Results of the 2017 legislative election held on 15 October 2017:

Party		Votes per district			Total votes	%	Seats
Party		Baden	Möd- ling	Voting card	Total votes	%	Seats
Austrian People's Party	ÖVP	25,368	26,157	365	51,890	31.63%	1
Social Democratic Party of Austria	SPÖ	24,943	18,805	320	44,068	26.86%	1
Freedom Party of Austria	FPÖ	23,643	14,428	255	38,326	23.36%	1
NEOS	NEOS	4,821	6,346	154	11,321	6.90%	0
Peter Pilz List	PILZ	4,274	4,769	130	9,173	5.59%	0
The Greens	GRÜNE	2,405	3,424	87	5,916	3.61%	0
My Vote Counts!	GILT	1,105	722	15	1,842	1.12%	0
Communist Party of Austria	KPÖ	478	520	13	1,011	0.62%	0
The Whites	WEIßE	166	116	3	285	0.17%	0
Free List Austria	FLÖ	127	76	1	204	0.12%	0
Valid Votes		87,330	75,363	1,343	164,036	100.00%	3
Rejected Votes		921	564	10	1,495	0.90%	
Total Polled		88,251	75,927	1,353	165,531	84.51%	
Registered Electors		106,533	89,344		195,877		
Turnout		82.84%	84.98%		84.51%		

The following candidates were elected:

- Party mandates - Christian Höbart (FPÖ), 3,497 votes; Carmen Jeitler-Cincelli (ÖVP), 4,779 votes; and Andreas Kollross (SPÖ), 3,359 votes.
