= Andreas Kollross =

Austrian politician (born 1971)

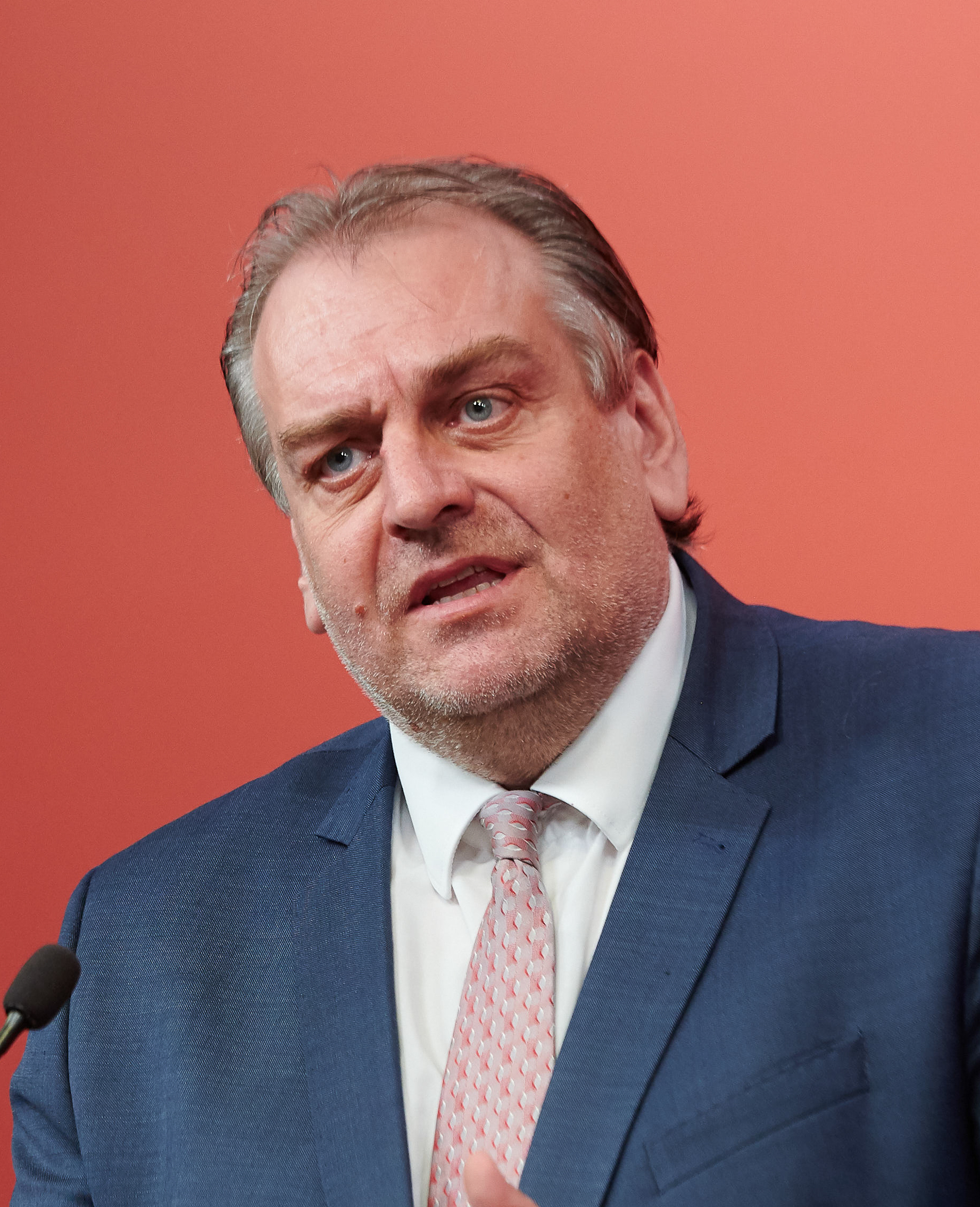
- Kollross in December 2020

Member of the National Council
- In office 9 November 2017 – 23 October 2024
- Constituency: Thermenregion

Personal details
- Born: 8 January 1971 (age 55) Baden, Austria
- Party: Social Democratic Party
- Website: andreaskollross.at

Andreas Kollross (born 8 January 1971) is an Austrian politician and former member of the National Council. A member of the Social Democratic Party, he represented Thermenregion from November 2017 to October 2024.

Kollross was born on 8 January 1971 in Baden. He studied at a business school in Baden from 1985 to 1986 before training to be an electrician at a vocational school in Stockerau. He worked for the Social Democratic Party (SPÖ) in Lower Austria from 1994 to 2017, including as District Manager in Baden District (2003 to 2013) and in the state office (2013 to 2017).

Kollross has held various positions in the Socialist Youth Austria (SJ): chairman of the Trumau branch (1989–1992), state chairman in Lower Austria (1993–2001) and federal chairman (2000 to 2004). He was a member of the municipal council in Trumau from 1995 to 2003 and the town's mayor since 2013. He has been chairman of the Lower Austrian branch of the Austrian Friends of Children, an organisation affiliated to the SPÖ, since 2004. He has been chairman of the Baden District branch of the SPÖ since 2016. He was elected to the National Council at the 2017 legislative election.

On 23 March 2022 the right wing Kronen Zeitung newspaper alleged that Kollross punched a man in Trumau on the evening of 1 March 2022, an allegation that Kollross denied. In December 2023 Kollross was criticised for trivialising sexual violence against women after posting a joke on Facebook about Braveheart and Ius primae noctis.

Electoral history of Andreas Kollross
Election	Electoral district	Party	Votes	%	Result
2006 legislative	Lower Austria South East	Social Democratic Party	307	0.70%	Not elected
2008 legislative	Lower Austria South East	Social Democratic Party	259	0.70%	Not elected
2013 legislative	Lower Austria South East	Social Democratic Party	465	1.41%	Not elected
2013 legislative	Federal List	Social Democratic Party	14	0.00%	Not elected
2017 legislative	Thermenregion	Social Democratic Party	3,359	7.62%	Elected
2017 legislative	Lower Austria	Social Democratic Party	240	0.09%	Not elected
2017 legislative	Federal List	Social Democratic Party	83	0.01%	Not elected
2019 legislative	Thermenregion	Social Democratic Party	3,396	10.51%	Elected
2019 legislative	Lower Austria	Social Democratic Party	200	0.10%	Not elected
2019 legislative	Federal List	Social Democratic Party	106	0.01%	Not elected
2024 legislative	Lower Austria	Social Democratic Party	42	0.02%	Not elected
2024 legislative	Federal List	Social Democratic Party	13	0.00%	Not elected
