= John Gudenus =

Austrian politician (1940–2016)

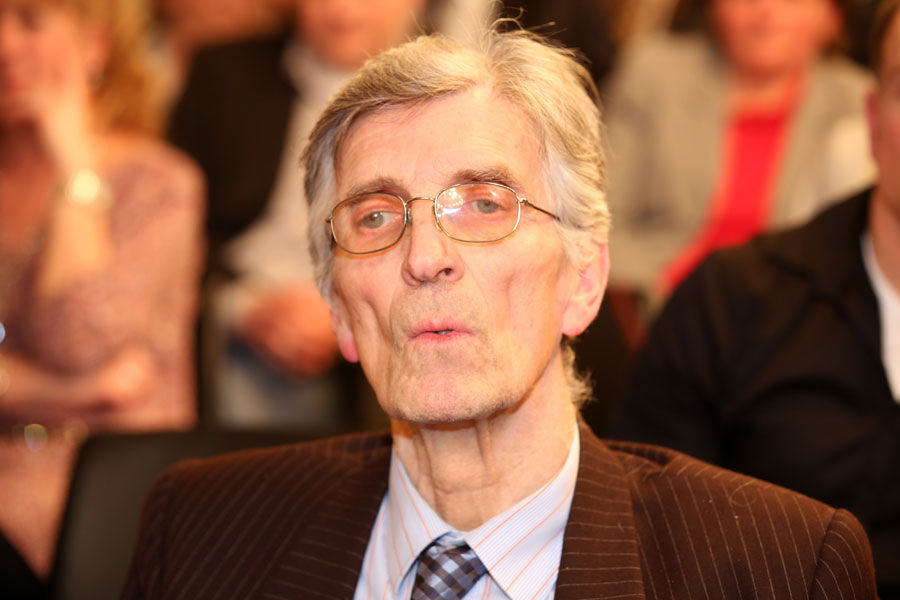
John Gudenus in 2014

John Gudenus or John, Graf von Gudenus (23 November 1940 – 15 September 2016) was an Austrian member of the Federal Council of Austria on a free mandate (formerly as a member of the Freedom Party of Austria), and colonel of the Austrian Bundesheer.

== Early life ==
Born into the noble Gudenus family, he was born as the eldest child of Johann Baptist Theodor Franz de Paula Philipp Maria, Graf von Gudenus (1908-1968) and his Norwegian wife, Karin Giaever (1905-1980), who was distantly related to Ivar Giaever.

== Biography ==
In 2006, Gudenus received a one-year suspended sentence for breaking the Verbotsgesetz, Austria's laws against denying or diminishing the Holocaust. Gudenus had suggested that it was necessary to verify the existence of gas chambers in Nazi Germany and later remarked that there had been gas chambers in Poland but not in Germany.

Austria's Der Standard newspaper argued that these two remarks were "cynical and humiliating", and show contempt for the Verbotsgesetz.

== Personal life ==
On 12 August 1970 in Els, John Gudenus married Marie Louise Biloghan (b. 1951), daughter of Austrian Oberst Leopold Bilogan (1912–1995). They have four sons:

- Markus John Gudenus (b. 1974)
- Johann Baptist Björn Gudenus (b. 1976), FPÖ politician
- Jens Severin Gudenus (b. 1983)
- Clemens Magnus Gudenus (b. 1990)

== Bibliography ==
- Art, David (2006). The Politics of the Nazi Past in Germany and Austria. Cambridge University Press. ISBN 978-0-521-85683-6.
