= Police corruption in Austria =

Corruption by police in Austria

Until 2010, few corruption cases had been prosecuted against the Austrian police. There have been a low number of indictments relating to corruption. This is supported by Transparency International's Corruption Perception Index, which ranks Austria among the 16 countries with the lowest corruption levels, with 7.8 points. The general public supports these statistics further, as only 25% believe that bribery offering and bribery acceptance are widespread amongst Austrian police officers. Whilst this figure may still appear to be high, it is still much lower than the average for the EU (34%). The success, in comparison to many other nations, can be in part attributed to the stable economic performance of the state, which allows the Austrian police force to receive appropriate salaries. As a result, the likelihood that a significant number of Austrian police officers would consider engaging in corrupt practices as a way of making a living is minimal, and rather acts of police corruption tend to be committed episodically. Austria is a gateway to the European Union from Eastern European countries, which creates additional corruption opportunities. Despite this, studies illustrate that officers and supervisors tend to be knowledgeable about the boundaries of the police culture, especially with regard to the types of behaviours permitted and prohibited.

Whilst Austria has somewhat been devoid of corruption, there have been several corruption cases, particularly over the last several years, which question the accountability of the Austrian police. In 2006, the Vienna police chief was charged with abuse of office and unauthorized acceptance of gifts from private companies, testament to the rising number of corruption acts committed by Austrian police. This is further expressed by Eurobarometer data that emphasises this recent spike in police corruption, as surveys highlighted that in 2011, 80% of Austrian citizens exclaimed that corruption was a serious problem, compared to 60% in 2009. The figures from 2011 are above the EU average of 76%, indicating that the recent years have been littered with police corruption crimes that include abuse of office, unauthorized disclosure of information, as well as bribery acceptance. Despite such a rapid elevation in corruption cases amongst police authorities in Austria, no public data and scarce quantities of academic research detailing the number of police officers registered or suspected of or involved in acts of corruption are available. This makes it extremely difficult to assess the extent and nature of the corrupt practices being conducted by the Austrian police. This is because the institutions in charge of countering corruption have only started analyzing it in the last few years, due to the contemporary context in which police corruption in Austria is situated. Despite this recent escalation in police corruption prevalence, Austria still remains a country that is characterized by a low number of corruption cases compared to other countries throughout the world.

The economic security of Austria has allowed the police to develop internal control measures that are necessary for identifying and combating corruption. Established internal control measures include the Office for Internal Affairs, the Office for Public Affairs, as well as the Office of the Ombudsman. These developments, amongst many others, are illustrative of the active, preventive approach adopted by the Austrian government and the Ministry of the Interior to address the recent trend of corruption manifestations. These institutional bodies, coupled with the high degree of intolerance toward corruption amongst Austrian citizens, and the stable nature of the Austrian economy, appear to facilitate the foundations for a positive framework needed in order to mitigate and eradicate police corruption throughout Austria.
