= Gernot Rumpold =

Austrian politician (born 1957)

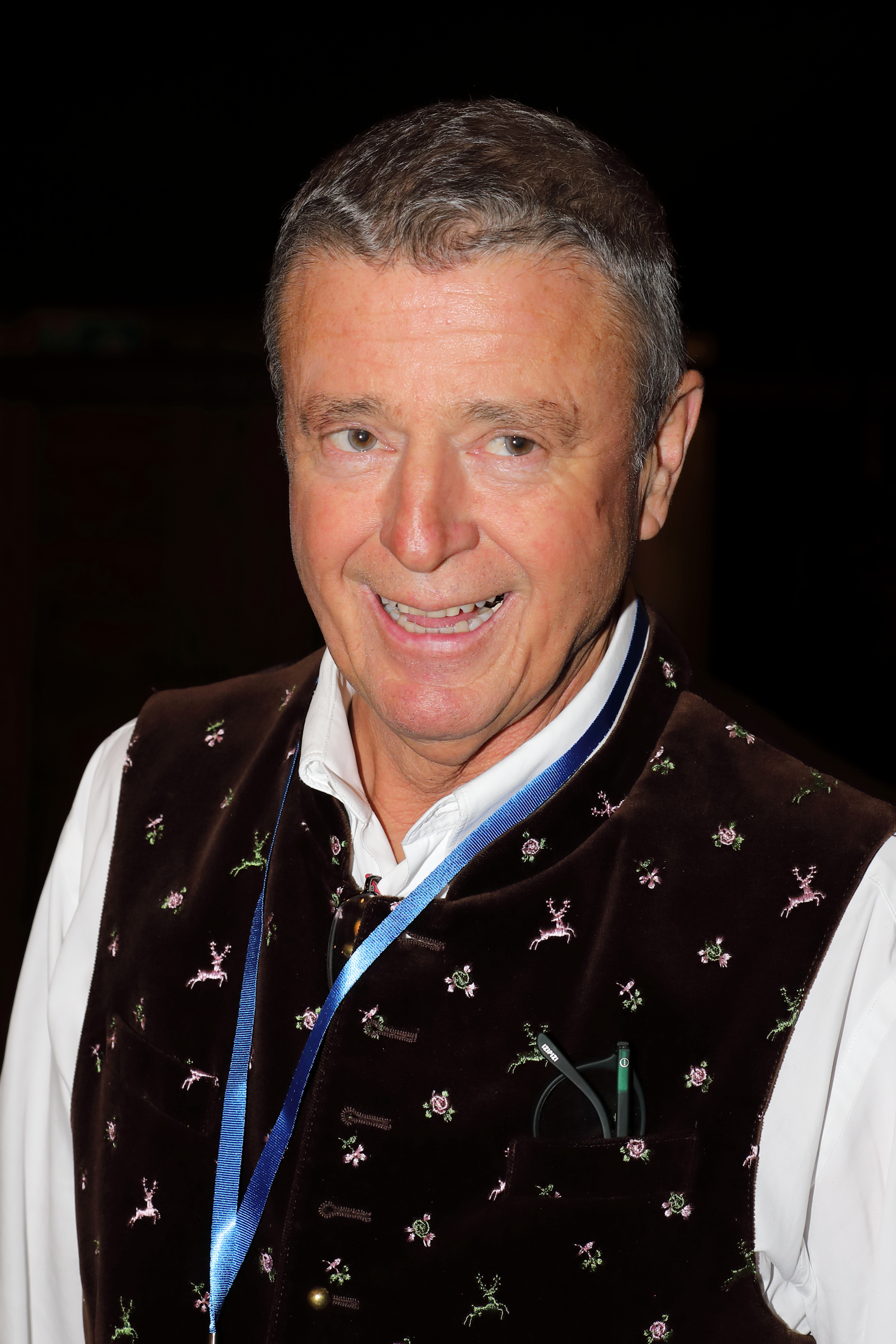
Gernot Rumpold

Gernot Rumpold (born September 11, 1957) is an Austrian politician, best known for his association with Jörg Haider.

Rumpold was born in Villach, Carinthia, and received his vocational education at an engineering-focused secondary school in Pinkafeld, apprenticing as an electrician. From the 1970s, he became known as Jörg Haider's Mann fürs Grobe (roughly, hatchet man), and became the only constant fixture in Haider's retinue during the next quarter century, even though his working-class background came across as suspect to some in Haider's upper-class-dominated FPÖ. After working as an HVAC technician from 1980 to 1982, he served in a number of capacities in the FPÖ during the 1980s: organizational advisor to the FPÖ from 1982 to 1984, managing director of the FPÖ in Carinthia from 1984 to 1986, and personal advisor to the FPÖ chairman (Haider) in 1986. Although generally content to operate behind the scenes, he was a member of the Federal Council of Austria for a short time, serving from October 30, 1989, to June 6, 1990. He subsequently served as business manager of the FPÖ from 1990.
