= BUWOG Affair =

Austria corruption scandal

The BUWOG Affair (German: BUWOG-Affäre) was an Austrian corruption scandal that led to the convictions of former Finance Minister Karl-Heinz Grasser and several key associates. The scandal centered on a kickback scheme during the 2000-2004 privatization of BUWOG, Austria's government-owned social housing company.

In 2000, the Austrian government, led by Chancellor Wolfgang Schüssel, decided to sell its portfolio of federal apartments with Grasser overseeing the bidding process. In June 2004, a consortium led by Immofinanz, an Austrian real estate company, won the bid with an offer only marginally higher than the other contender, CA Immo. The narrowness of the winning bid later led to allegations that Grasser and his associates had leaked the minimum acceptable bid to Immofinanz in exchange for a bribe.

On December 4, 2020, eight defendants were convicted by the Vienna Regional Criminal Court for breach of trust and bribery. Those convicted included Grasser, lobbyists Peter Hochegger and Walter Meischberger, and former Immofinanz CEO Karl Petrikovics. On March 25, 2025, the Austrian Supreme Court upheld the core convictions but reduced the sentences for Grasser, Hochnegger, Meischberger, and Petrikovics.

== Background ==
The second Schüssel government was formed as a coalition between the Austrian People's Party (ÖVP) and the Austrian Freedom Party (FPÖ) in 2002 after the political infighting in the FPÖ and the Knittelfeld Putsch made the first ÖVP-FPÖ coalition collapse. Following significant gains by the ÖVP in the election results, the ÖVP-FPÖ alliance was reestablished with Grasser, formerly an FPÖ member, continuing his role as the finance minister, this time nominated by the ÖVP.

Schüssel's government heavily promoted economic liberalism. Grasser, in line with this policy, pursued his political goal of "Nulldefizit" (zero-deficit budget) to balance Austria's federal budget. To achieve this, Grasser pushed for the privatization of state assets, such as BUWOG and Telekom Austria, and implemented temporary tax hikes to increase federal revenue. The zero-deficit was achieved during Grasser's tenure but was criticized for relying on short-term gains from asset sales rather than meaningful budget reform.

=== Sale of BUWOG ===
BUWOG ("Bundeswohnungsgesellschaft") was founded in 1951 by the Austrian government to create affordable housing for federal employees but later expanded to provide affordable social housing to the general public. It was one of the largest landlords in Austria and managed approximately 62,000 apartments across Austria.

In 2000, the Federal Ministry of Finance decided to privatize federally-owned housing as part of its broader liberal policy of privatizing state assets. After an initial attempt to sell the apartments directly to tenants failed, BUWOG and several other smaller federal housing companies, including ESG Villach, WAG Wohnanlagen, WAG Wohnungsanlagen GmbH, were put up for sale. The Ministry of Finance, led by Grasser, was responsible for the sale and hired the American investment bank Lehman Brothers for €10.6 million to act as its professional advisor.

In May 2004, the bidding was narrowed down to two final contenders: real estate company CA Immo and a consortium consisting of Immofinanz, Raiffeisenlandesbank Oberösterreich, and Vienna Insurance Group. On June 15, 2004, it was announced that the consortium had narrowly won the bid with €961.2 million over CA Immo's bid of €960 million.

== Investigation ==
In late 2009, while investigating the financial collapse of Constantia Privatbank and its ties to Immofinanz, the Vienna Public Prosecutor's Office began looking into the real estate company's finances. They were informed by Christian Thornton, a former Immofinanz board member, of a suspicious €9.6 million payment to lobbyist Peter Hochegger and his business partner, former FPÖ General Secretary Walter Meischberger, related to the BUWOG privatization. At this time, Hochegger was already under investigation for his role in the Telekom Austria affair. In September 2009, both Hochegger and Meischberger filed a voluntary tax disclosure to mitigate penalties for tax evasion. The disclosure officially confirmed the secret payment, triggering the criminal investigation into the BUWOG privatization. Hochegger had reportedly offered his services to former Immofinanz CEO Karl Petrikovics to secure the acquisition of BUWOG, with the €9.6 million being a commission for insider information provided by Meischberger, a close associate of Grasser.

On October 24, 2009, Michael Ramprecht, a former member of Grasser's cabinet, incriminated Grasser and real estate agent Ernst Plech in rigging the BUWOG bidding process. Ramprecht alleged that Plech pressured him to select Lehman Brothers to oversee the privatization, conveying that it was the preferred choice of the finance minister.

The subsequent seven-year investigation from 2009 to 2016 uncovered a complex international trail designed to hide the money trail. Immofinanz signed a contract with Hochegger's lobbying company, Valora AG, for €9.6 million if the Immofinanz-led consortium won the bidding. The €9.6 million were then paid to Astropolis Limited, Hochegger's shell company in Cyprus. Hochegger kept a portion and transferred the majority, approximately €7.7 million, to Walter Meischberger's shell company, Omega, which was based in Liechtenstein. Assistance from Liechtenstein authorities revealed that the money in the Omega account was immediately split and transferred into three secret Liechtenstein bank accounts belonging to Meischberger, Plech, and Grasser.

The investigations revealed that the Omega account was directly connected to Grasser's Waterland and Silverland Foundations in Liechtenstein. Investigators traced specific transactions showing that money originating from the BUWOG commission was transferred from Meischberger's accounts into Grasser's foundations and was used to finance Grasser's personal lifestyle. The most prominent example was the purchase and renovation of his luxury villa in Maria Wörth, Carinthia near Lake Wörthersee. Investigators proved that €1.3 million from the Gemain Limited, a company owned by the Waterland Foundation, were funneled through another of Grasser's companies, SMW OG, to pay for the property.

Prosecutors also investigated Grasser's 2005 deposit of €500,000 in cash into a Swiss bank account, suspecting it was a case of money laundering related to his share of the BUWOG bribe. Grasser explained that the money belonged to Marina Giori-Lhota, the mother of his then-fiancée, Fiona Swarovski.

On May 26, 2011, the public prosecutor's office conducted coordinated raids on ten properties connected to Grasser in Vienna, Carinthia, and Tyrol in relation to the BUWOG Affair and possible tax evasion in his offshore accounts.

=== Terminal Tower case ===
In the early 2000s, the Austrian construction company Porr and Raiffeisenlandesbank Oberösterreich developed Terminal Tower, a new office building next to Linz's main train station. It was completed in 2008 and reportedly cost €55 million to build.

The developers wanted to secure Upper Austrian Finance Directorate as a tenant but was originally rejected by Grasser due to the higher rent costs. In 2005, UBM Realitätenentwicklung, a Porr-owned company, agreed to pay a €200,000 consulting fee to Hochegger and Meischberger to secure the rental contract. The fee was sent to Hochegger's company, Valora AG, and then transferred to Meischberger. In 2006, Grasser approved the decision to move federal financial authorities into the Terminal Tower.

On January 28, 2010, police conducted raids at the headquarters of Porr and UBM in relation to the BUWOG and Terminal Tower cases.

== Trials and convictions ==
On July 21, 2016, following a seven-year investigation, the Public Prosecutor for Economic and Corruption Affairs filed indictments in the BUWOG and Terminal Tower cases. Charges were brought against Karl-Heinz Grasser, his associates Walter Meischberger, Peter Hochegger, and Ernst Plech, former Immofinanz CEO Karl Petrikovics, and eleven other individuals. The trial began on December 12, 2017.

In April 2020, prosecutors further charged Grasser and his tax advisor, H. with tax evasion, alleging he failed to pay Austrian taxes on the illegal income hidden in his offshore accounts. On July 4, 2022, the court acquitted Grasser, finding that it could not be proven that Grasser or his advisor had the intent to evade Austrian taxes.

On December 4, 2020, eight of the defendants, including Grasser, Meischberger, Hochegger, and Petrikovics, were convicted of breach of trust and bribery in the BUWOG and Terminal Tower cases. Grasser was sentenced to eight years in prison and his legal team immediately appealed the decision. Plech's trial was indefinitely halted after he was declared permanently unfit to stand trial due to a serious illness.

On March 25, 2025, the Austrian Supreme Court upheld the five convictions from the BUWOG and Terminal Tower cases but reduced the sentences for the three main defendants, Grasser, Meischberger, and Hochegger, and others. Grasser's sentence was reduced to 4 years and Meischberger's was reduced to 3.5 years. Hochegger's sentence was reduced to 3 years with 2 years suspended due to his admission of guilt. Immofinanz ex-CEO Petrikovics was reduced from 2 years to 12 months suspended. Grasser and Meischberger were also ordered by the Supreme Court to pay back €9.8 million to the state. On June 2, 2025, Grasser began his sentence at the Innsbruck Correctional Facility.
