= Immofinanz =

Austrian real estate company

CPI Europe AG
- Type: Aktiengesellschaft
- ISIN: AT0000A21KS2
- Founded: 19 April 1990 in Vienna, Austria
- Headquarters: Vienna, Austria
- Key people: Pavel Mĕchura; Vít Urbanec, Zdeněk Havelka; Miroslava Greštiaková, Chair of the Supervisory Board
- Revenue: 754,2 Mio. (2025)
- Number of employees: 534 (2025)
- Website: https://cpi-europe.com/de/home

CPI Europe AG (formerly Immofinanz AG) is a real estate company headquartered in Vienna, Austria. The company focuses mainly on the office, retail, and residential segments and is active in Austria, Germany, the Czech Republic, Slovakia, Hungary, Romania, Poland, Slovenia, Croatia, and Serbia. As of 31 December 2025, the company's managed real estate portfolio was worth approximately €8.70 billion, spread across 357 properties. The company is listed on the Vienna and Warsaw stock exchanges.

== History ==
In 1990, Constantia Privatbank and the banking house Schoeller & Co founded the company C&S Immobilien Anlagen AG, which went public in 1991. After Schoeller withdrew in 1994, the company was renamed Immofinanz Immobilien Anlagen AG.

In 1997, the company acquired Business Park Vienna, where the Vienna Twin Tower was later built. In 2000, Immofinanz took over all shares in Wipark Garagen AG, and a year later, in 2001, it acquired City Tower Vienna and apartments in Houston.

The company built up its regional Immoeast segment, and its first foreign investment was made in Hungary. In December 2003, Immoeast Immobilien Anlagen AG went public.

In autumn 2004, Immofinanz acquired BUWOG, which held around 20,000 apartments, along with a majority stake in ESG Villach.

In the 2004/2005 financial year, the company entered the Romanian, Russian, and Slovak markets, while its US engagement, begun in 2001, was wound down.

In 2005/2006, the company acquired a portfolio of 440 properties in Italy, fully leased to the Italian state.

In June 2008, Immofinanz purchased the real estate division of Constantia Privatbank, acquiring 40% directly and 60% through its subsidiary Immoeast, which brought the company's management in-house.

During the 2008 financial crisis, Immofinanz lost more than 95% of its market capitalization within a year and posted a pre-tax loss of around €2.65 billion. In September, the company disclosed a liquidity requirement of nearly €500 million that had not yet been secured. In October, CEO Karl Petrikovics was replaced by former Austrian Airlines CFO Thomas Kleibl. Criminal proceedings were opened against former board member Karl Petrikovics by the Vienna public prosecutor's office. Petrikovics was sentenced to six years in prison, and supervisory board chairman Schwager to four and a half years; the verdicts became legally binding in October 2015.

Effective 1 March 2009, Immoaustria was sold to Immoeast. In April 2009, Wipark Garagen AG was sold to a subsidiary of Wiener Stadtwerke.

On 29 April 2010, Immofinanz merged with Immoeast to form the Immofinanz Group.

According to a 2013 Forbes ranking, Immofinanz was one of eleven Austrian companies among the Global 2000 (ranked 1,798th).

In April 2014, Immofinanz spun off 51% of its residential subsidiary BUWOG, making it independent. German residential group Vonovia acquired BUWOG in 2018.

In May 2015, Oliver Schumy became the new CEO of Immofinanz. Under his leadership, the portfolio was concentrated on the office and retail asset classes. According to Immofinanz's 2015 annual report, all historical investor lawsuits were settled out of court.

In August 2016, Immofinanz acquired approximately 26% of CA Immobilien Anlagen AG, with plans to merge the two companies into one of the largest commercial real estate groups in continental Europe. The planned merger was later abandoned, and the stake was sold off entirely in July 2018.

In December 2016, the management board and supervisory board decided to divest the Russian retail portfolio. The sale of this portfolio to Fort Group in 2017 marked Immofinanz's exit from the Russian market.

In March 2020, CEO Oliver Schumy left the management board, and in April 2020 Ronny Pecik was appointed as a board member and CEO for a three-year term, effective 4 May.

In June 2020, the company carried out a capital increase of around €356 million. While Immofinanz described the move as an investment in the future and a "strengthening of the capital base amid the coronavirus pandemic," the Austrian Interest Association for Investors (IVA) criticized the capital increase as a "hasty overnight action." The shares were reportedly issued well below book value, allegedly benefiting institutional investors and Immofinanz CEO Ronny Pecik at the expense of retail shareholders.

In June 2021, Ronny Pecik resigned as CEO.

In January 2022, CPI Property Group (CPIPG) launched an anticipatory mandatory offer to Immofinanz shareholders and holders of the 2017–2024 convertible bond. The result was a controlling stake for CPIPG in Immofinanz. Following the statutory three-month additional acceptance period, CPIPG's stake in Immofinanz reached 76.9%.

At the end of 2022, Immofinanz acquired a majority stake of 50% plus one share in S IMMO. In 2024, a squeeze-out of S IMMO's minority shareholders was approved and became legally effective upon entry in the commercial register on 3 December. As a result, Immofinanz now holds 100% of the shares in S IMMO AG.

At the Annual General Meeting in January 2025, shareholders approved renaming Immofinanz AG to CPI Europe AG. The renaming took legal effect on 11 March 2025 upon entry in the commercial register.

== Brands of Immofinanz ==
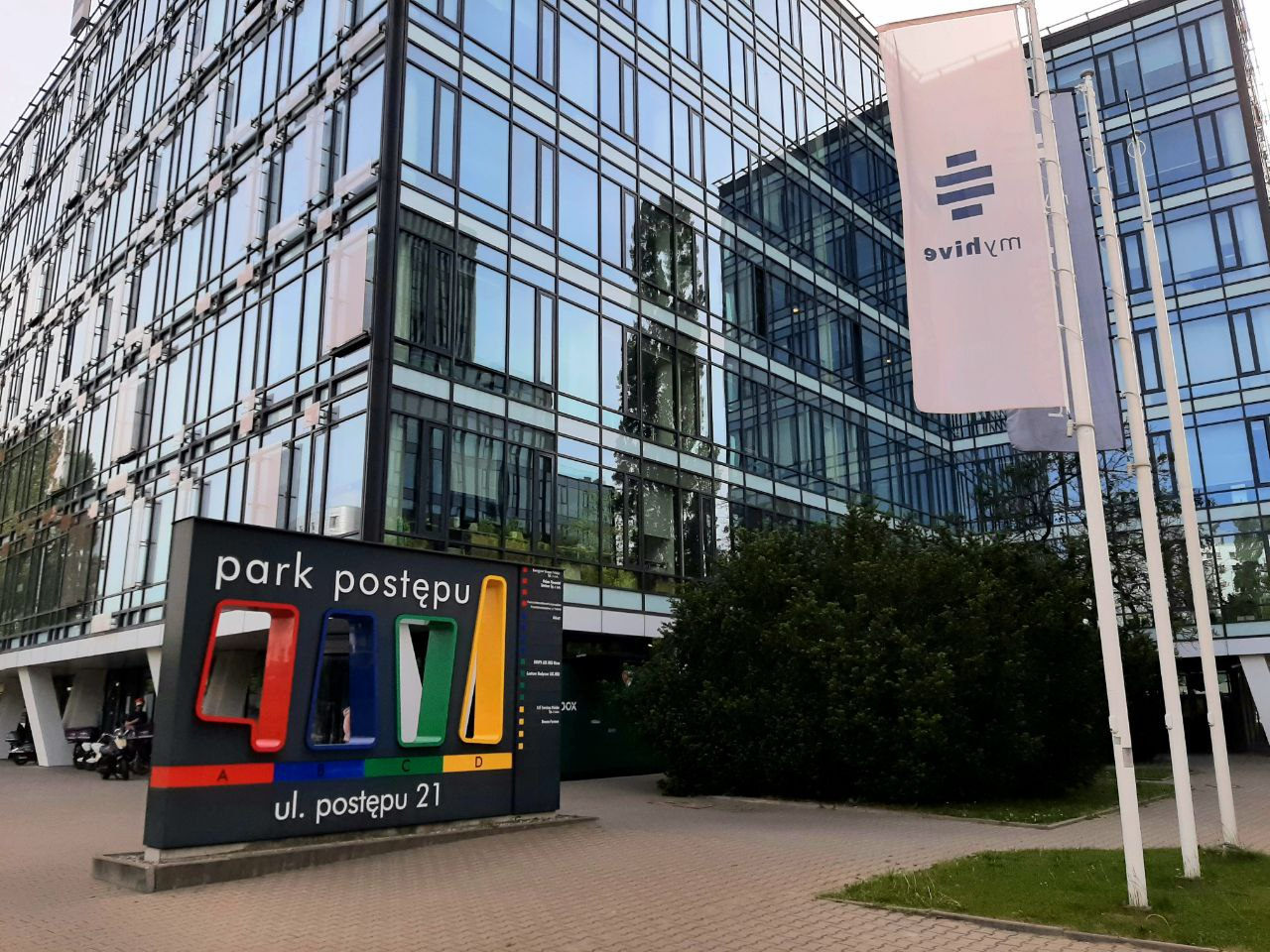
Myhive Park Postępu in Warsaw, Poland

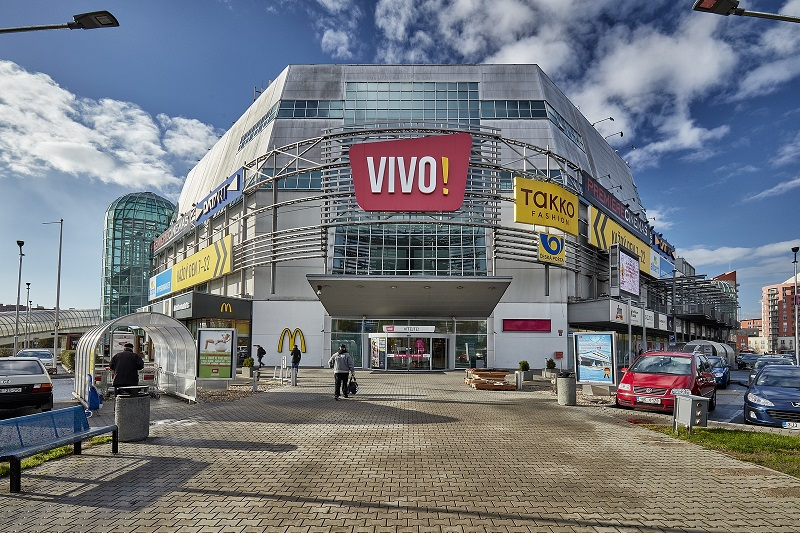
Vivo! Hostivař, Czechia

Immofinanz operates the following brand names:

VIVO! has been used since 2005 for shopping centers in cities with a catchment area of at least 200,000 residents. As of 31 December 2025, there were 9 locations across three countries with a total leasable area of approximately 312,000 m².

STOP SHOP has been used since 2014 for retail parks in Central and Eastern Europe with a catchment area of 30,000 to 150,000 residents. STOP SHOP locations offer leasable space of roughly 8,000 to 15,000 m² each. As of 31 December 2025, there were 117 locations across ten countries with a total leasable area of approximately 932,000 m².

myhive has been used since 2016 for office buildings in the capital cities of Central and Eastern Europe. As of 31 December 2025, there were 25 locations with a total leasable area of approximately 603,000 m².

== BUWOG affair ==
→ Main article: BUWOG Affair

Former Immofinanz CEO Karl Petrikovics is suspected of having improperly obtained information about competitors' highest bids during the 2004 purchase of 60,000 federally owned apartments (see BUWOG Affair), via a €9.6 million commission paid to PR consultant Peter Hochegger and lobbyist and former FPÖ politician Walter Meischberger.

The Vienna public prosecutor's office has opened several proceedings in the case on suspicion of breach of trust, including against then-Finance Minister Karl-Heinz Grasser.

On 21 July 2016, the Central Public Prosecutor's Office for Combating Economic Crimes and Corruption announced charges against Karl-Heinz Grasser, Peter Hochegger, Walter Meischberger, Ernst Plech, and twelve other individuals in the BUWOG and Terminal Tower cases. The verdict was handed down in December 2020: former Finance Minister Karl-Heinz Grasser was sentenced to eight years in prison. Co-defendants Walter Meischberger and Peter Hochegger were also found guilty. On 25 March 2025, the Austrian Supreme Court largely upheld the guilty verdicts but reduced the sentences, citing the lengthy duration of the proceedings. Karl-Heinz Grasser received an unconditional four-year sentence, former lobbyist Walter Meischberger was sentenced to 3.5 years, also unconditional, former Immofinanz CEO Karl Petrikovics received a 12-month suspended sentence, and Hochegger received an additional three-year sentence, partly suspended. Karl-Heinz Grasser has announced his intention to appeal to the European Court of Human Rights.
