= Carmen Jeitler-Cincelli =

Austrian politician (born 1980)

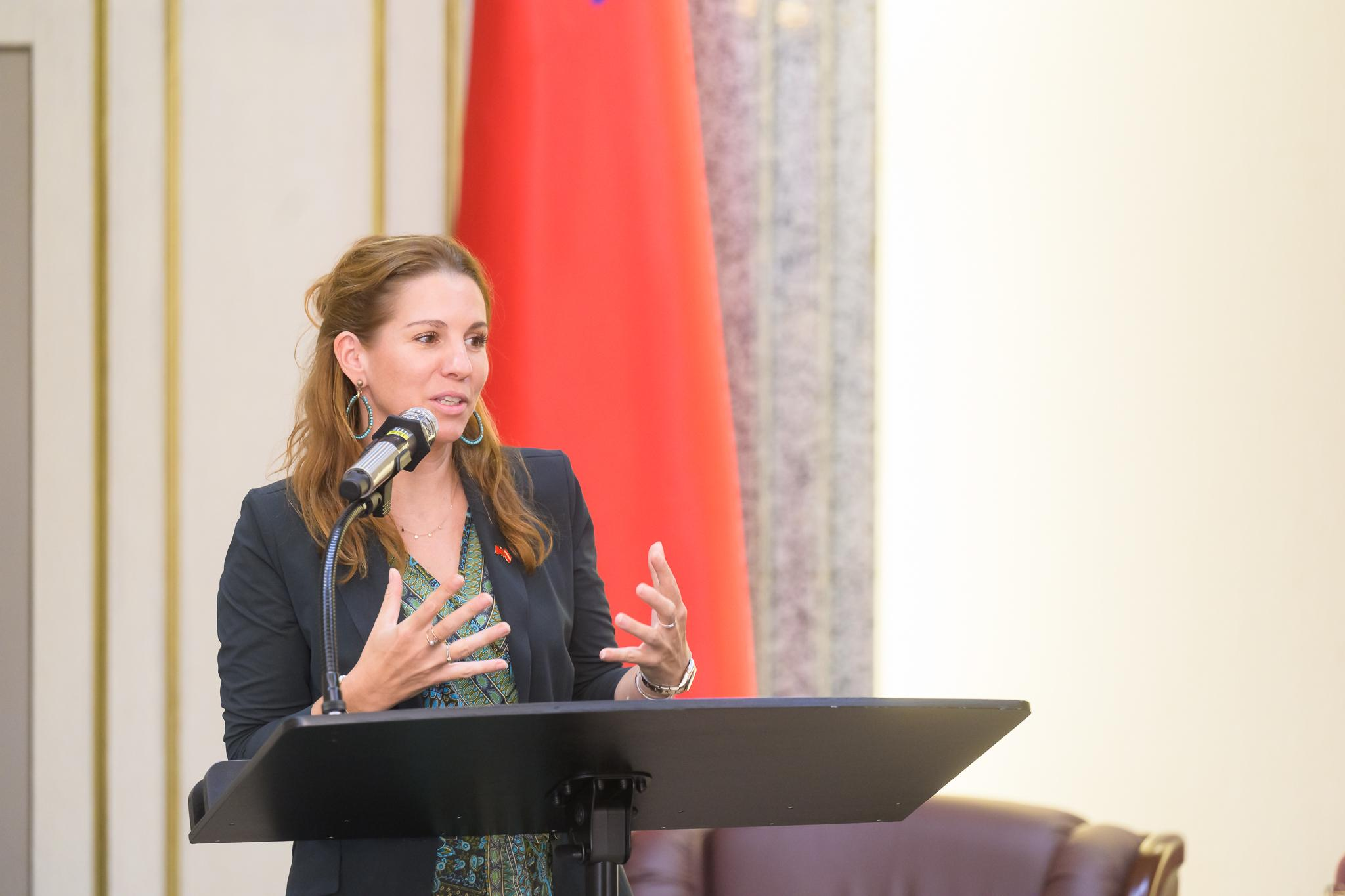

Member of the National Council
- Incumbent
- Assumed office 9 November 2017
- Constituency: Thermenregion

Personal details
- Born: Carmen Cincelli; 27 July 1980 (age 46) Innsbruck, Austria
- Party: ÖVP
- Spouse: Georg H. Jeitler
- Education: University of Vienna

Carmen Jeitler-Cincelli (born 27 July 1980 in Innsbruck), often shortened as Carmen Jeitler, is an Austrian entrepreneur, politician (ÖVP) and member of the Austrian National Council. Since March 2025, she is mayor of the spatown Baden bei Wien.

== Education ==
Carmen Jeitler-Cincelli (née Cincelli) attended the elementary school in Sistrans and then the Akademisches Gymnasium Innsbruck, where she graduated in 1999 with the Matura. She completed her bachelor's degree and then master's degree in journalism and communication science at the University of Vienna. She took electives from law and philosophy.

In 2018 she completed an executive course at the Executive School of Management, Technology and Law at the University of St. Gallen.

== Work ==
Carmen Jeitler-Cincelli has been a partner since 2002 and a member of the management board of a communication and consulting firm established together with her husband. Since 2014 she is the sole managing director of the company. Her professional interests include location marketing, design and staging in commerce and communication for public institutions.

As a speaker, she speaks on the topics of courage culture, leadership and city marketing, and destination branding.

== Politics and public functions ==
Carmen Jeitler-Cincelli was already involved politically and socially in various fields during her schooling and studies.

From the year 2007, she worked as district chairwoman of the association Woman In The Economy for the district Baden, which she held until the year 2015. In 2009, she ran for the European Parliament in the European elections of that year. In 2012, she was elected as the chairwoman of the Wirtschaftsbundes Baden. She unsuccessfully ran for the National Council in 2013. In 2014, she assumed the honorary position of chairwoman of the City Marketing Baden association with the aim of reviving the inner city of Baden and founded the non-profit regional lifestyle magazine Baden Passion, as its editor and editor-in-chief. As part of the 2014 program Evolution People's Party, she was Evolution Ambassador and participated in the substantive reorientation of the People's Party.

In 2015, she ran for the city council of Baden and was appointed to the municipal council after the election as a councilor for business and city marketing. In her function as city councilor, she was responsible for the new development of the destination brand Baden bei Wien.

In the National Council election of 2017, Carmen Jeitler-Cincelli ran as a leading candidate of the new People's Party in the newly created regional constituency Thermenregion and gained a seat in the XXVI. National Council.

Carmen Jeitler-Cincelli negotiated the chapter on women in the coalition contract in the coalition negotiations on government formation following the election.

On 8 March 2018, her appointment as Deputy Secretary General of the Austrian Business Association was announced with the task of strengthening and expanding the area of social policy.

=== Parliamentary tasks ===
Carmen Jeitler-Cincelli is a member of the following parliamentary committees:

- Foreign Policy Committee
- Permanent Subcommittee on European Union Affairs
- Permanent Subcommittee on matters relating to the European Stability Mechanism
- Equal Treatment Committee (deputy chairwoman)
- Committee on Family and Youth (secretary)
- Committee on Human Rights

She is a substitute member of the Committee on Internal Affairs, the Committee on Economic Affairs, Industry and Energy, the Tourism Committee, and the Education Committee.

== Awards ==
Carmen Jeitler-Cincelli has received numerous awards for her work in her communications company and has won more than 40 prizes in creative competitions over the years. Her company was repeatedly the most awarded advertising agency in Lower Austria. On a personal level, Carmen Jeitler won a runner-up in the young talent competition Cannes Young Lions Austria twice.

== Personal life ==
Carmen Jeitler-Cincelli is married to the entrepreneur and anti-corruption expert Georg H. Jeitler and is the mother of three children.

The children of the couple were born in the years 2002, 2005 and 2009, the couple allegedly split in 2023.

Her eldest son, Moriz, is active in Austrian student politics and chairman of the centre-right group AktionsGemeinschaft at the law faculty of the University of Vienna and an elected member of the Federal representation, the national parliament of the Austrian Students' Association.

Carmen Jeitler resides in Baden bei Wien since 2001. She is a member of the Christian secondary school associations Veldidena Innsbruck and Vulkania Baden.

== Publications ==
- Erwartungen, mediale Bilder und ein möglicher Weg. In Poier, K. / Konschegg, K. / Spannring, J. (Hg.): Jugend und Soziale Gerechtigkeit. Leykam, Graz 2008, ISBN 978-3-7011-0132-0
- Vom Point of Sale zum Point of Tale – Der Verkaufsort als Träger von Geschichten. Magisterarbeit, Universität Wien 2012
- Baden bei Wien: Mit viel Mut zur starken Stadtmarke. Der Faktor Mensch im Destinationsbranding. In Kausch, T. / Pirck, P. / Strahlendorf, P. (Hg.): Städte als Marken 2: Herausforderungen und Horizonte. New Business, Hamburg 2017, ISBN 978-3936182606
