= Zeitler =

Zeitler is a surname. Notable people with the surname include:

- Charles Zeitler (1871–1903), American football player from South Bend, Indiana
- Günter Zeitler, German handballer
- Kevin Zeitler (born 1990), American football player
- William Zeitler (born 1954), American armonica player
- Yehoshua Zettler (1917–2009), (last name also spelled as Zeitler), the Jerusalem commander of Jewish paramilitary group Lehi
