= Forensic economics =

Forensic Economics as defined by the National Association of Forensic Economics (NAFE) is the scientific discipline that applies economic theories and methods to matters within a legal framework. Forensic economics covers, but is not limited to:

- the calculation of pecuniary damages in personal and commercial litigation;
- the analysis of liability, such as the statistical analysis of discrimination, the analysis of market power in antitrust disputes, and fraud detection; and,
- other matters subject to legal review, such as public policy analysis, and business, property, and asset valuation.

The National Association of Forensic Economics is an organization for the advancement and exchange of research and methods in the field of forensic economics. In support of this mission, NAFE publishes the peer reviewed Journal of Forensic Economics; NAFE publishes a quarterly newsletter, The Forecast; sponsors academic and professional sessions at international, national, and regional meetings of economists; and maintains the NAFE Statement of Ethical Principles/Principles of Professional Practice (SE4P) which was updated effective January 4, 2020. NAFE has been Promoting the Advancement of Forensic Economics since 1985.

In a 2012 paper by Eric Zitzewitz entitled “Forensic Economics,” Journal of Economic Literature 2012, 50(3), 731–769, published by the American Economic Association, "Forensic Economics" was defined as the application of economics to the detection and quantification of harm from behavior that has become the subject of litigation.

The only difference between these two definitions is that one suggests the application of science is itself a scientific discipline. Notwithstanding this distinction, both definitions refer to the application of economics. While courts may dictate what economic issues are to be addressed, the economic science that is applied must be that which is taught and practiced in the world at large.

== Examples of applications of economics in litigation ==
- Antitrust liability and economic damages
- Unfair practices in international trade
- Economic damages in copyright violation and patent infringement
- Liability from transfer pricing manipulations and abusive tax avoidance
- Economic analysis for detection of economically important hidden behavior and quantification of harm
- Contract violations
- Discrimination
- Economic damages in injury and death
- Economic damages related to physical and emotional abuse
- Child support calculations

“Forensic Economics: An Overview” provides additional detail concerning the work of forensic economists. The article appeared as part of a “Symposium on Forensic Economics.”

== See also ==
- Forensics
- Hedonology
