= Tetron Affair =

Austrian corruption affair

The Tetron Affair (German: Tetron-Affäre or Blaulichtfunk-Affäre) originated from the procurement of a new federal digital radio systems for authorities and emergency forces in the early 2000s in Austria and is one of the most notable corruption complexes in recent Austrian history.

It involved possible money laundering and commission payments to political functionaries around the procurement process, which was based on presumably manipulated tenders by the Austrian Ministry of the Interior between 2001 and 2003. The incidents surrounding the TETRON consortium consisting of Motorola, Alcatel and Telekom Austria, which was awarded with the final bid, have been the subject of numerous investigative and judicial proceedings and were gradually clarified over the course of the late 2010 years.

== Origin ==
In summer 2011, in the course of the investigations into the Telekom Austria Affair, numerous dubious money flows from the partly state-owned Telekom Austria (TA) to political decision-makers and parties were uncovered, dating back to the year 2000. According to a former board member of TA who appeared as a state witness, a part of payments of 1.1 million euros is said to have flowed in 2008 as commission payment to Alfons Mensdorff-Pouilly, who is known as a lobbyist especially in the defense sector. Allegedly, the money was hidden in accounts distributed over Europe.

== Investigations and judicial proceedings ==
The Vienna Public Prosecutor's Office was investigating on suspicion of money laundering and bribery as well as the suspicion of abuse of office and betrayal of secrets.

In September 2011, the US Securities and Exchange Commission began investigating Mensdorff-Pouilly and Motorola. The American electronics company allegedly directed between €2.2 million and €2.6 million to the Austrian lobbyist from April 2004 for "improper payments" (holidays and gifts) to policymakers in Europe and the Middle East, including to influence the Tetron bidding process.

In August 2011, the Austrian Court of Audit, was commissioned to conduct a special audit of the procurement transactions.

At the end of 2011, a corruption investigation committee was set up by the Austrian parliament to clarify the political responsibility of the Tetron affair.

In connection with Telekom Austria's payments being made to him, Alfons Mensdorff-Pouilly 2015 was sentenced to three years' unconditional imprisonment and to repay 1.1 million euros in damages, and Telekom Austria Executive Rudolf Fischer to was sentenced to one year's unconditional imprisonment, on charges of breach of trust, both of whom filed appeals. In 2017, the Vienna Higher Regional Court reduced Mensdorff-Pouilly's sentence to two years' imprisonment, 16 months of which were conditional.

== German name of the affair ==
In Austria, the affair often is referred to as Blaulichtfunk-Affäre, literally translated "blue light radio affair", which relates to emergency lights on vehicles being called "Blaulicht" in German.

== See also ==
- Corruption in Austria
- Telekom Austria Affair
