= Johann Gudenus =

Austrian politician (born 1976)

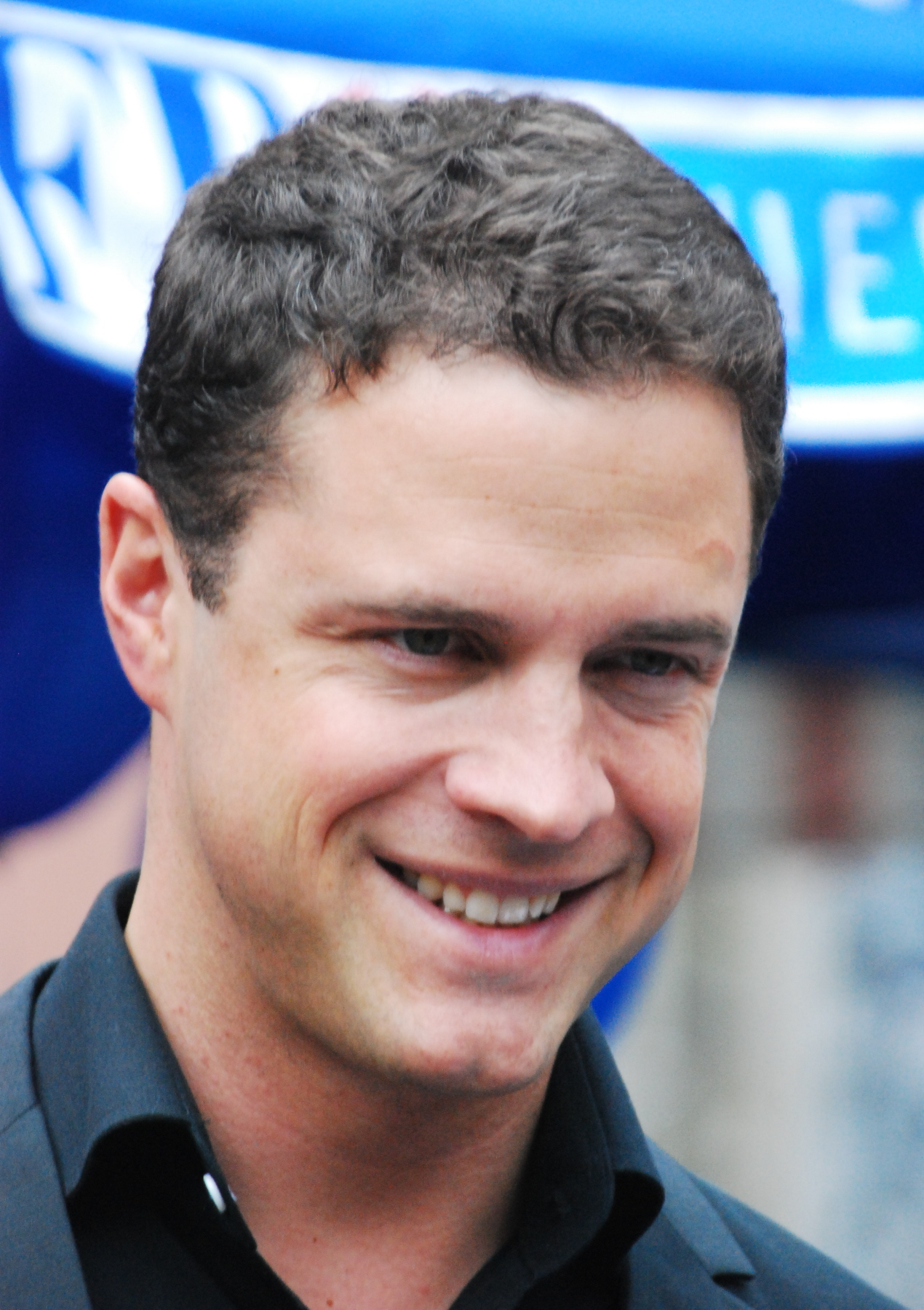

Personal details
- Born: 20 June 1976 (age 49) Vienna, Austria
- Political party: Freedom Party
- Spouse: Tajana Tajčić

Johann Gudenus or Johann Baptist Björn Graf von Gudenus (born 20 July 1976) is a former Austrian politician who served as a deputy leader of the Freedom Party.

== Early life ==
Born into the noble Gudenus family, he is the second born son of FPÖ politician John Graf von Gudenus and his wife, Marie Louise Bilogan (born 1951), daughter of Austrian Oberst Leopold Bilogan (1912–1995). He has three brothers.

== Politics ==
From 2017 to 2019 he was a member of the National Council. However, following the Ibiza affair, Gudenus resigned from all political posts in May 2019.

== Personal life ==
In 2016 he married the Bosnian Serbian Tajana Tajčić.

They have one son and a daughter, Gudenus also has a son from his first marriage.
