= Ibiza affair =

2019 political scandal in Austria

Screenshot of the video that triggered the affair, showing Johann Gudenus (left), his wife Tajana (centre) and Heinz-Christian Strache (right) meeting with the sting operative in July 2017

The Ibiza affair (German: Ibiza-Affäre), also known as Ibiza-gate, was a political scandal in Austria involving Heinz-Christian Strache, the former vice chancellor of Austria and leader of the Freedom Party (FPÖ), as well as Johann Gudenus, formerly a deputy leader of the Freedom Party.

The scandal was triggered on 17 May 2019 by the publication of a secretly recorded video, which was commissioned by Iranian-born lawyer Ramin Mirfakhrai (Persian: رامین میرفخرایی), of a meeting in Ibiza, Spain in July 2017, which shows then opposition politicians Strache and Gudenus discussing their party's underhanded practices and intentions. In the video, both politicians appeared receptive to proposals by a woman calling herself Alyona Makarova, who was posing as a niece of Russian businessman Igor Makarov, discussing providing the FPÖ with positive news coverage in return for government contracts. Strache and Gudenus also hinted at corrupt political practices involving other wealthy donors to the FPÖ in Europe and elsewhere.

The scandal caused the collapse of the Austrian governing coalition on 18 May 2019 and the announcement of an early election. In a no-confidence vote on 27 May, Sebastian Kurz was voted out of office as Austrian chancellor by Parliament, and on 28 May a caretaker government was appointed. The election was set for 29 September. In 2020, a partial transcript of an as of yet unreleased portion of the video was published by the public prosecutor's office. Strache claimed the new material showed he never committed illegal activity, though he was later convicted of corruption.

== Video ==
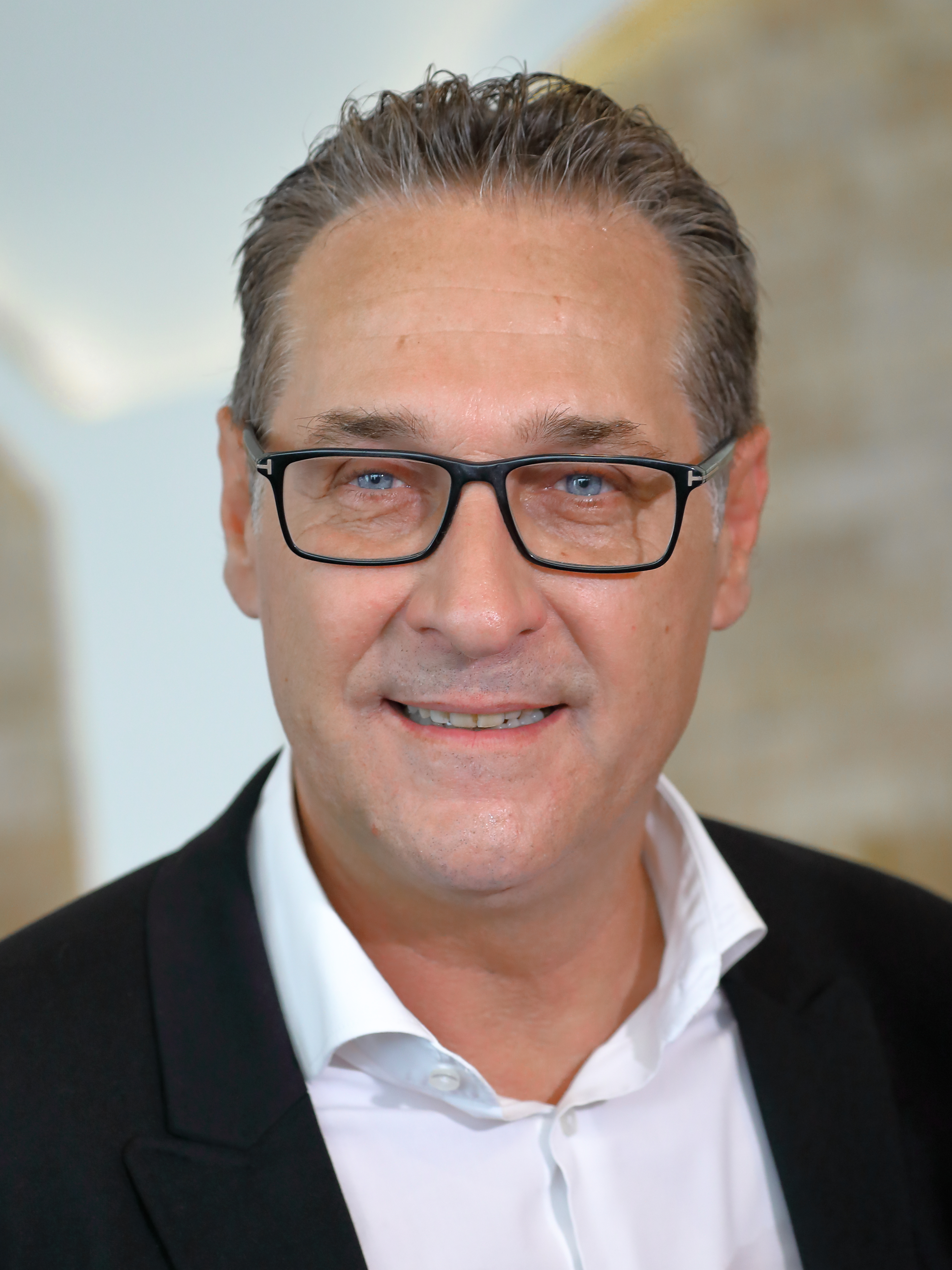
Heinz-Christian Strache in 2020

On 17 May 2019, Der Spiegel and the Süddeutsche Zeitung reported that in 2017, Strache and Freedom Party member Johann Gudenus had been offered electoral support by a woman posing as the niece of a Russian oligarch named Igor Makarov. The source of the allegations was a video secretly recorded at a rented villa on Ibiza in July 2017, which apparently shows Strache agreeing to offer the woman assistance in acquiring business contracts in Austria in exchange for rendering support in the upcoming October 2017 election in Austria. Five people took part in the videotaped meeting, according to the German news outlets, which had examined parts of the tape but had not released the full recordings available to them. Those persons included Heinz-Christian Strache; a woman who said she was the niece of a Russian oligarch; an interpreter (who came with her); another Freedom Party official, Johann Gudenus, who appears to have set up the meeting; and Gudenus's wife, Tajana (née Tajčić). The persons spoke in English, German, and Russian.

In the footage, according to Der Spiegel, Strache told the putative investor that he had visited Russia on many occasions and that he had had meetings with advisers of Russia's president Vladimir Putin with a view to forging a "strategic collaboration". He agreed to the woman's suggestion that she might help his party in the 2017 election by buying the mass-circulation tabloid, the Kronen Zeitung; Strache further suggested that she donate funds through their party associations that would be difficult to audit.

During the conversation in the footage, Strache said he had contacts with Israelis who opposed left-wing politics in Israel, and that he had been invited to China to promote business between Austria and China. Strache appears to have said that the companies Glock Ges.m.b.H. and Novomatic, and investors Heidi Horten and René Benko, had made large donations to both the FPÖ and the ÖVP using nonprofit associations, allegations that all have denied.

Strache also said that Hans Peter Haselsteiner, a major shareholder of the construction company Strabag, would no longer receive commissions from the government.

In the video, Strache is recorded to have said he wanted to "build a media landscape like Orbán".

== Context of Ibiza setup ==
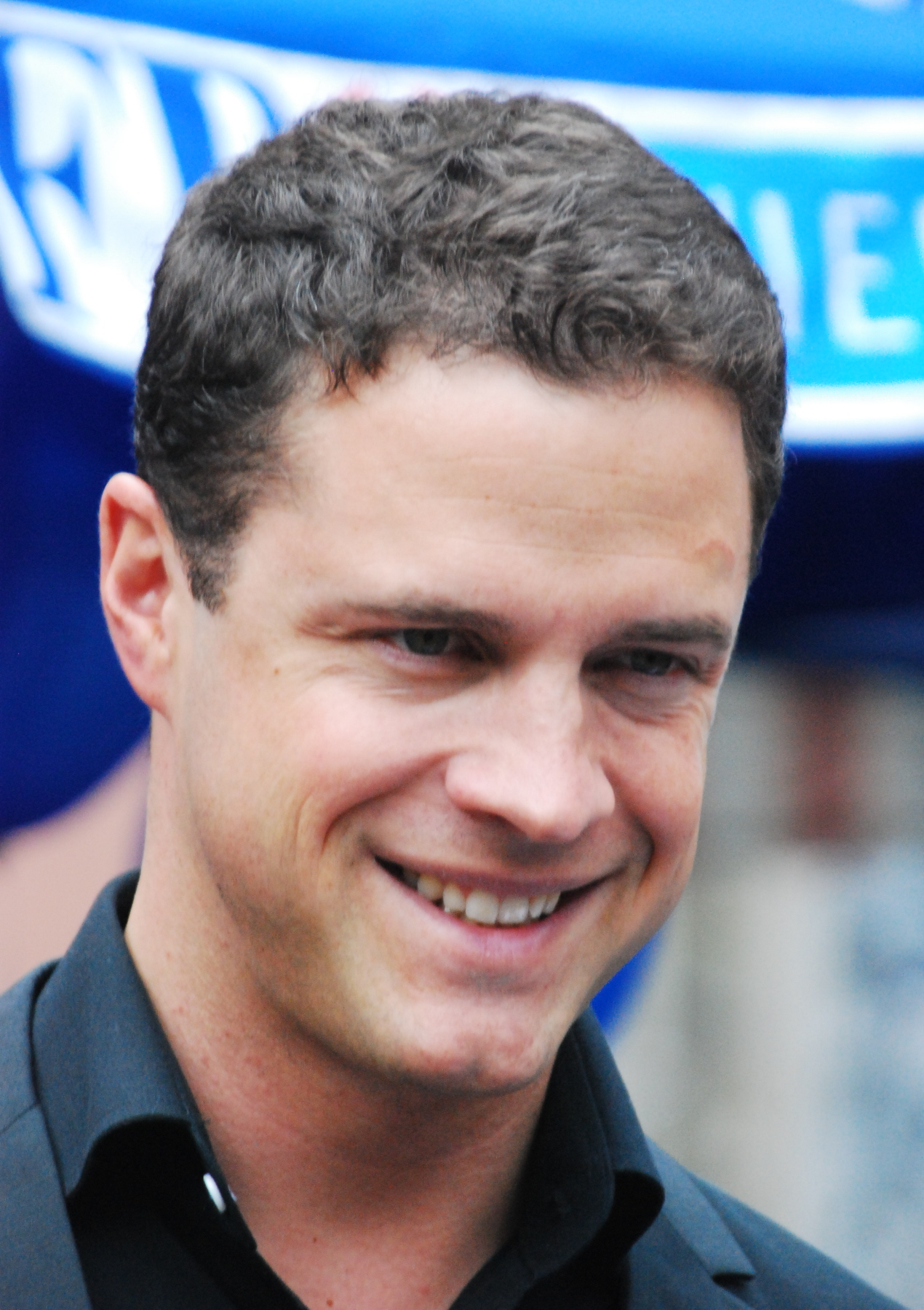
Johann Gudenus in 2012

The meeting in the villa was set up by Gudenus, who had several previous meetings with the woman in Vienna; Gudenus also provided some of the translation during the meeting as he speaks Russian. At some point of the meeting, Gudenus says to the suspicious Strache: "No, it's not a trap". Johann Gudenus stated in a later interview that the person who made the first contact to the potential niece of a Russian oligarch, and who was also present at the first meeting on 24 March 2017, was an attorney from Vienna. According to the interview, the man also confirmed the identities of the woman and her German accomplice to Gudenus. The attorney himself refused to give information to the press, pointing to attorney–client privilege and requesting not to be named in publications.

Der Spiegel and Süddeutsche Zeitung, which obtained and analysed parts of the video (over six hours), maintain that they did not know the identity and motives of those who made the video and provided it to them. On 22 May 2019, the two responsible journalists of the Süddeutsche Zeitung, Pulitzer prize winning journalists Bastian Obermayer and Frederik Obermaier, spoke on a television talkshow about the way they had been shown excerpts of the material by the informant. During their second meeting with the source, some polarization technology was used, so that they had to use specially coated glasses to be able to see the material on a laptop the informant had provided. Both papers involved, Der Spiegel and Süddeutsche Zeitung, said they had not paid for the video.

=== Speculation and research ===
The highly professional setup of the apparent trap, the amount of time and money expended on preparing and realising it, made Germany's Die Welt wonder who might have been behind this operation meant to create what the newspaper referred to as Kompromat (incriminating material to be used at the right moment to undermine one's enemy), which had been held back for two years and made public days before the European Parliament election to be held in May 2019.

Austrian newspaper Wiener Zeitung linked Germany's political activist group, Zentrum für Politische Schönheit, to the creation of the video, in view of its prior activity as well as the suspicious behaviour on Twitter, the group being the first to follow a new account that was the first to tweet about the initial publication of the video's content.

Chancellor Sebastian Kurz pointed out the similarities to methods used by Israeli election adviser Tal Silberstein who had been detained for questioning on money-laundering charges in Israel before the 2017 Austrian election. Silberstein was accused in Austria of having used methods of negative campaigning in support of the SPÖ in the 2017 election. However, Silberstein denied any involvement in the Ibiza video and accused Kurz of trying to distract from the scandal itself. Austrian writer and historian Doron Rabinovici criticized Kurz for "entirely irresponsibly" invoking antisemitic stereotypes.

German tabloid Bild speculated that Austrian lawyer Ramin Mirfakhrai, who was born in Tehran, and Julian Hessenthaler, an Austrian private investigator with a dummy address in Munich, were behind this operation. Later in May 2019 Ramin Mirfakhrai via his attorney Richard Soyer stated in a press release that he had commissioned the video.

Journalistic research by the Kronen Zeitung indicated that "attorney M." had been looking for a potential buyer for two years, before finally selling the video for €600,000 in Krugerrand coins to an organisation based in Germany. According to the research, the role of the Russian oligarch's niece was played by a Bosnian agricultural student, specially cast for the job.

== Aftermath ==
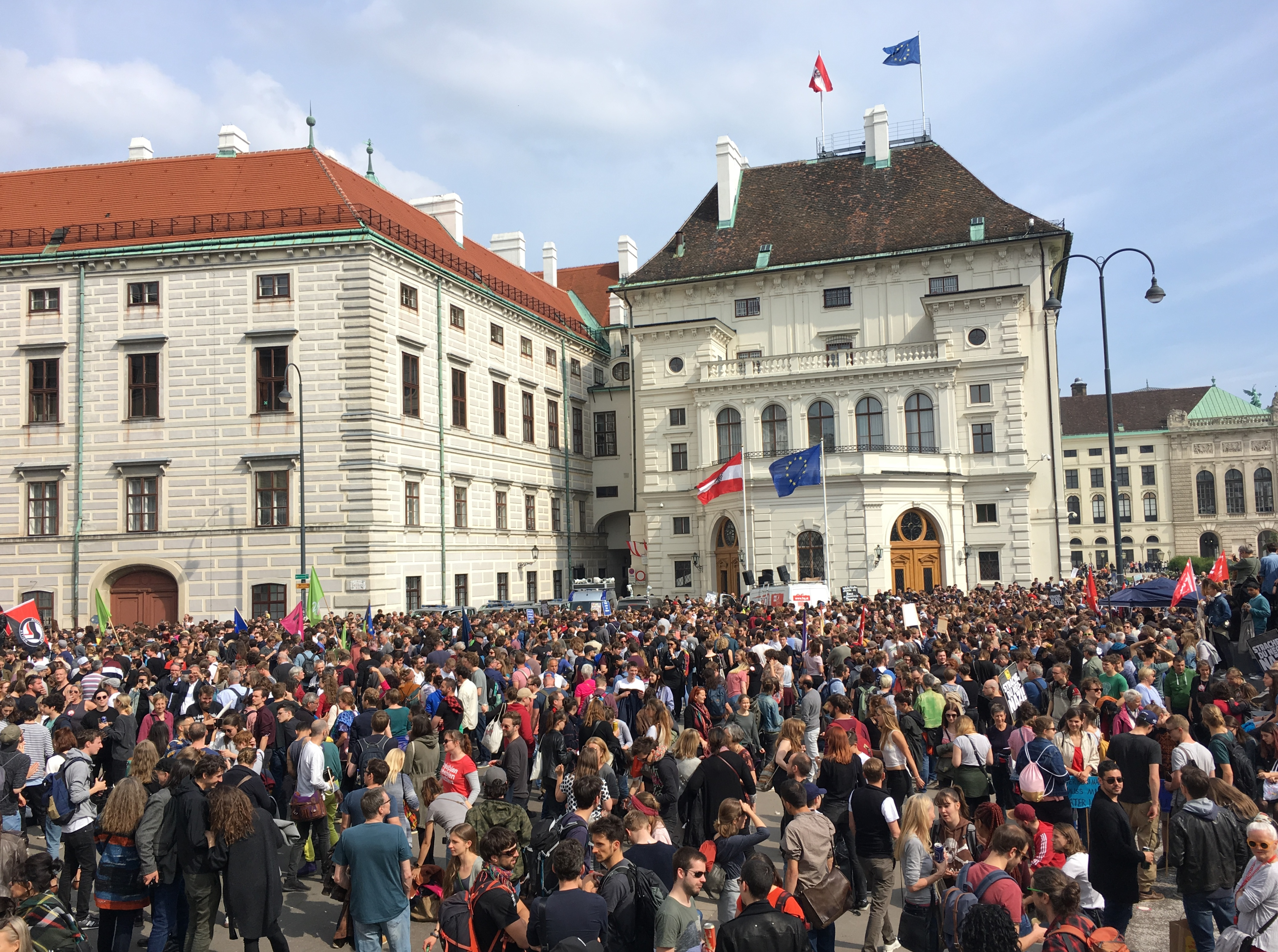
A rally on the Ballhausplatz on 18 May 2019 demanding an early election

=== Resignations of Strache and Gudenus ===
On 18 May 2019 at noon CEST, Strache announced his resignation as Vice-Chancellor of Austria and Chairman of the Freedom Party at a press conference. He said that he offered Chancellor Kurz his resignation from the office of Vice-Chancellor at 11:00 CEST that day, shortly before attending the press conference. Kurz accepted the withdrawal and responded that he would advise President Alexander Van der Bellen to formally dismiss Strache. Strache nominated Norbert Hofer, who is Infrastructure and Traffic Minister as well as deputy chairman of the Freedom Party, as his successor for the office of Vice-Chancellor and party leader. The Freedom Party presidium is slated to convene on 19 May and officially appoint Hofer acting and designated party leader.

At the press conference, Strache portrayed the recording of the video as an illegal and immoral act by the press and announced that he would take any legal action possible against the organizers, recorders and publishers of the video. However, he later admitted and recognized his wrongdoing. Furthermore, Strache wished for the first Kurz government to remain.

Shortly after Strache announced his resignation, Gudenus also announced his withdrawal from all political posts.

=== End of coalition and early election ===
On 18 May 2019, at 19:45 CEST, Chancellor Kurz delivered an official statement at a press conference in the Chancellery. In the statement, Kurz praised the cooperation between the two parties but stated "enough is enough" and thereby ended the current coalition government; he also said he had requested that President Alexander Van der Bellen initiate a legislative election as early as possible.

On 19 May, following a meeting with Kurz, Alexander Van der Bellen said the country's parties needed to "rebuild trust" with the electorate as soon as possible and advocated holding the election at the beginning of September.

=== Dismissal of Interior Minister Kickl ===
On 20 May 2019, at 18:00 CEST, Chancellor Kurz stated in a press conference that he requested President Alexander Van der Bellen to dismiss Minister of the Interior Herbert Kickl. Kickl was among the most controversial politicians of the Freedom Party and would, as Interior Minister, have headed the investigation of the Ibiza affair.

Furthermore, Kurz alleged that Kickl did not take the circumstances seriously after he appointed Peter Goldgruber to the Directorate General for Public Security following the revelation of the scandal. Goldgruber had already been a highly controversial figure before the Ibiza affair, especially due to the BVT affair in 2018. He served as the General Secretary of the Interior under Kickl, and is known for his close ties with the minister. As Director General for the Public Security, Goldgruber would directly oversee all of federal law enforcement in Austria. The same day, President Van der Bellen declined to confirm the appointment of Goldgruber. Experts believe that Kickl appointed Goldgruber as Director General to expand his party's influence over Austrian law enforcement and, since this is a non-cabinet position, Goldgruber would remain in office even after the end of the first Kurz government.

The Freedom Party had already announced jointly withdrawing all their ministers if Kurz dared to propose the dismissal of Kickl. Kurz responded that he would fill the ministerial posts with experts and top functionaries if the Freedom Party did so.

=== Resignation of FPÖ ministers ===
The resignation of all remaining FPÖ ministers in the Kurz government was reported on 20 May 2019, after the Chancellor's move against Herbert Kickl became public. A spokesperson for the FPÖ pointed out a party conference decision which stated that if the Chancellor moved against Kickl, all ministers would resign. In addition to Kickl, Minister of Social Affairs Beate Hartinger-Klein, Minister of Transport, Innovation and Technology Norbert Hofer and Minister of Defence Mario Kunasek represented the FPÖ in the Kurz administration. Minister of Foreign Affairs Karin Kneissl was appointed by the FPÖ but was not a member of the party.

=== Motion of no confidence ===
JETZT announced a vote of no confidence against the government, scheduled to take place on 27 May.

The former Minister of the Interior Herbert Kickl (FPÖ) said: "Who gives confidence gets confidence. Who gives no confidence gets no confidence." This implied that the FPÖ would vote against the Kurz government in the motion. The FPÖ formally claimed, however, that Kickl's words were taken out of context and that the party had not yet made a decision on the confidence vote.

On 27 May SPÖ entered a motion of no confidence against the government. FPÖ later announced its support for the motion.

The National Council passed the motion without a count, as the President determined there was a majority in favour of the no-confidence vote. Austrian President Alexander van der Bellen dismissed Kurz soon after and replaced him with Vice-chancellor Hartwig Löger.

The President later dissolved the Council and called a snap election, which was held in September 2019.

=== Criminal complaint ===
At the public prosecutor's office in Vienna, Strache filed a complaint against attorney Ramin Mirfakhrai, private investigator Julian Hessenthaler, and the alleged Russian Jane Doe. Julian Hessenthaler continues to be in custody.

In August 2020, the public prosecutor's office received an additional 5 minutes of video footage which appeared to relieve Strache from some of the accusations. In the uncut video, Strache had refused the decoy's offer and doing anything illegal. Similarly, Johann Gudenus had stated "we are not doing anything illegal, period". Strache accused Der Spiegel and the Süddeutsche Zeitung of showing selectively edited material.

=== Popularity of the "We're Going to Ibiza" song ===
Shortly after the scandal broke out, the 1999 "We're Going to Ibiza" song by Dutch pop group Vengaboys gained popularity in Austria, with comedian Jan Böhmermann reported to have posted a YouTube link to the song's music video on Twitter on 19 May 2019. The song was chanted by the people who came to Heldenplatz in front of the Hofburg Palace in Vienna after Strache resigned on 18 May. On 30 May, taking advantage of the popularity, the Vengaboys themselves went to Vienna to do an improvised street concert at Ballhausplatz singing the tune.

== Reactions ==
=== From persons mentioned in the video ===
==== Igor Makarov ====
Russian Turkmen-born businessman Igor Makarov, who the woman on the Ibiza video claimed was her uncle, made a statement published by the Russian edition of Forbes on 18 May 2019. He said he had no relation or connection to the woman on the video, and added that he was an only child. Makarov is now "using all lawful means to establish who was behind the illegal use of [his] name."

=== From Tajana Gudenus ===
Tajana Gudenus, Johann Gudenus's wife who comes from a Serbian family that left Croatia for Banja Luka in 1992, made a statement through her lawyers on 22 May 2019. She stated she was not responsible for the collapse of the Austrian government, nor did she in any way influence the events that led to the resignation of Heinz-Christian Strache.

=== From actress Lera Kudryavtseva ===
On 25 May 2019, Russian media reported that Russian actress and TV presenter Lera Kudryavtseva intended to file a suit against the Austrian daily Österreich for mentioning her name and using her photo in the newspaper's publication that suggested she might have been the Russian woman in the Ibiza video.

=== From Austrian politicians ===
==== Pamela Rendi-Wagner ====
On 17 May 2019, Chairwoman of the Social Democratic Party (SPÖ) and leader of the opposition Pamela Rendi-Wagner called for the immediate resignation of Strache and Gudenus.

The next day, she asked for Chancellor Kurz to advise President Alexander Van der Bellen to dismiss Strache. Later that day, she summoned a special meeting of the National Council and asked for Strache and Gudenus to be held accountable there.

At a press conference, Rendi-Wagner reaffirmed her condemnation of the intents and plans of Strache and Gudenus showcased in the video. She also stated that the simple resignation of both politicians would not suffice, it would need "complete clarification" of the case and new elections.

==== Werner Kogler ====
A few hours after the video tapes were published, Werner Kogler, leader of The Greens and the party's frontrunner to the European elections 2019, said the affair was "a case for the prosecutor". On 18 May 2019, one day after the videos' release, he joined thousands of protesters on Ballhausplatz, demanding new elections. Following Strache's resignation, Kogler further called for the dismissal of the Interior Minister, Herbert Kickl.

==== Beate Meinl-Reisinger ====
On 17 May 2019, NEOS party leader Beate Meinl-Reisinger described the scandal as "unacceptable" and called for the resignation of Strache, the whole Cabinet, and asked for new elections.

=== From outside of Austria ===
==== From German politicians ====
Chairwoman of the Christian Democratic Union Annegret Kramp-Karrenbauer stated that right-wing populists in Europe, in no matter which country, are willing to sell their country's interests for their own well-being. "Even if it's just for a sandwich. These people can not be allowed to assume any responsibility in Europe."

Leader of the European People's Party in the European Parliament Manfred Weber stated that "I've said it for a long time and I've said it many times [...], left and right wing extremists and populists are not a solution."

Social Democratic Party leader Andrea Nahles stated that "there must be new elections in Austria. A simple resignation by FPÖ leader Strache is insufficient."

Alliance 90/The Greens leader Annalena Baerbock states that "This outrageous scandal shows that right-wing populists despise our values like freedom of the press and the rule of law and are working to systematically erode democracy."

Free Democratic Party leader Christian Lindner said "Strache's video confirms serious concerns. The decision of Chancellor Kurz is consistent and correct. The AfD had found itself a kindred spirit. Will it now distance itself from the FPÖ?"

Leader of the Left Bernd Riexinger stated that "The Austrian right wingers surrounding Strache like to portray themselves as the 'party of the little man'. But the façade does not even reach Ibiza. While chatting with Russian oligarchs, the true face of the FPÖ emerges: the party of the rich, corrupt and brazen."

Alternative for Germany party leader Jörg Meuthen stated that "The FPÖ is a close partner to us. We will not stab the Austrian party in the back because of a singular affair."

President of the Bundestag Wolfgang Schäuble speculated that an intelligence agency was behind the shooting and the publication of the video. Schäuble was quoted saying "Did someone think they could blackmail him?" and "Has someone already been blackmailing him for the last two years?" He concluded that "this smells like an intelligence agency".

==== From the European Union ====
President of the European Commission Jean-Claude Juncker said on May 21 that he considered the events to be an internal affair of Austria. He neither triggered the crisis within the Austrian government nor would it be his job to fix it. Asked about the contents of the video, Juncker said the idea of offering a country to others on a silver platter would go against his patriotic sensibilities.

== See also ==
- Corruption in Austria
