= Telekom Austria Affair =

The Telekom Austria Affair (German: Telekom-Affäre) surfaced in 2011 and is one of the major corruption complexes in recent Austrian history. The affair has been the subject of numerous investigative and judicial proceedings. It consists of different, partially unrelated subareas and is based on management misconduct by executives of partially state-owned Telekom Austria as well as some business partners and politicians of the 2000–2007 government coalitions in Austria.

Suspicions included share price manipulation, unauthorised election campaign donations to the right-wing parties FPÖ and BZÖ, donations to sub-organisations of four parties, influencing the awarding of contracts, questionable football sponsoring and unclear company takeovers. On the margins, the Christian-conservative ÖVP and social democratic SPÖ are also said to be involved. It is considered as one of the biggest corruption cases in Austria's history and also led to the surfacing of the Tetron Affair.

The discovery of the affair led to former Austrian chancellor Wolfgang Schüssel's resignation from his National Council mandate.

The criminal trials led to convictions of politicians, managers and employees involved. Parts of related investigations and trials are still ongoing.

== See also ==
- Corruption in Austria
- Tetron Affair
