= Parliamentary parties involved in the 2008 Austrian legislative election =

Political overview article

2008 Austrian legislative election
- 28 September 2008

183 seats in the National Council of Austria 92 seats were needed for a majority
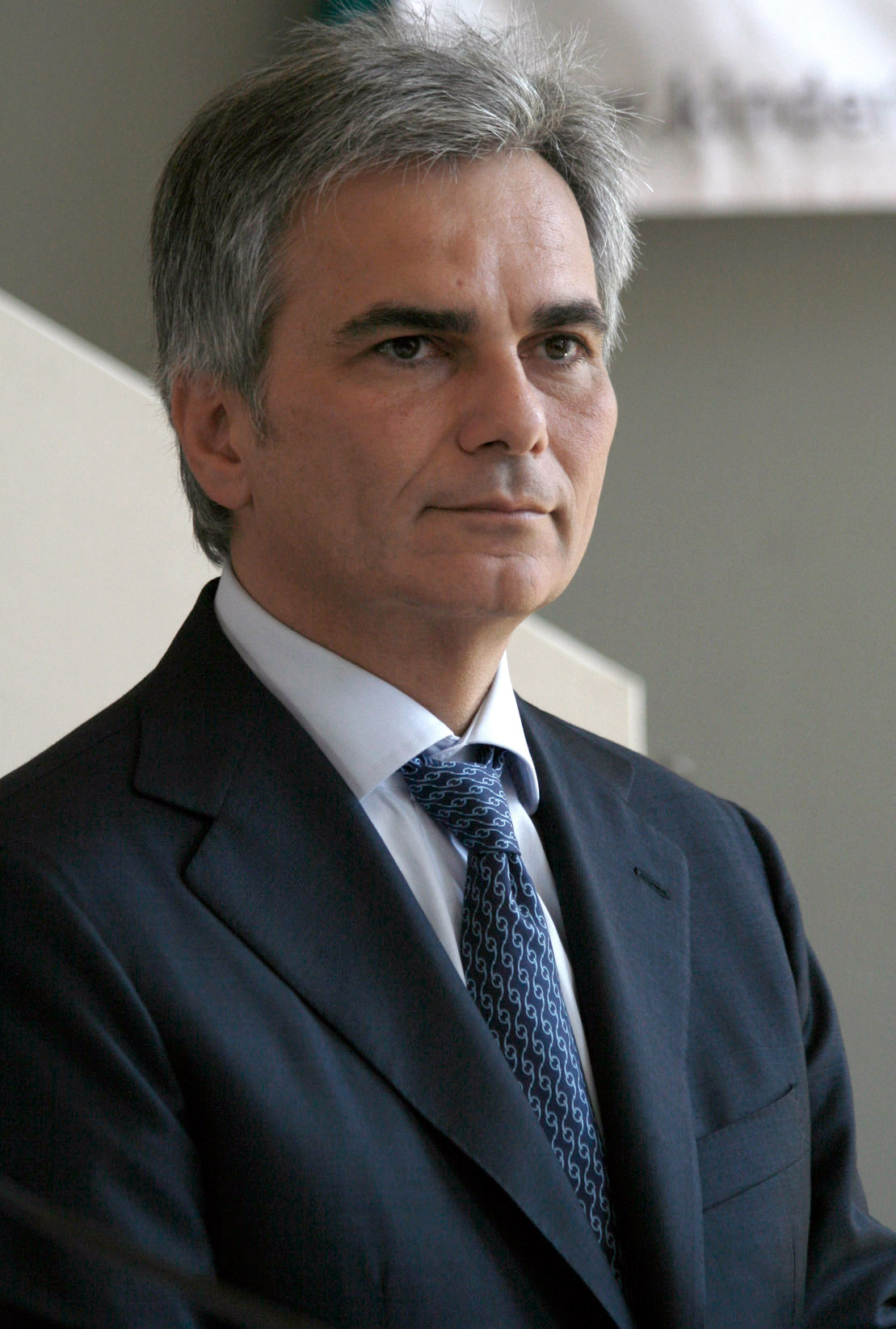

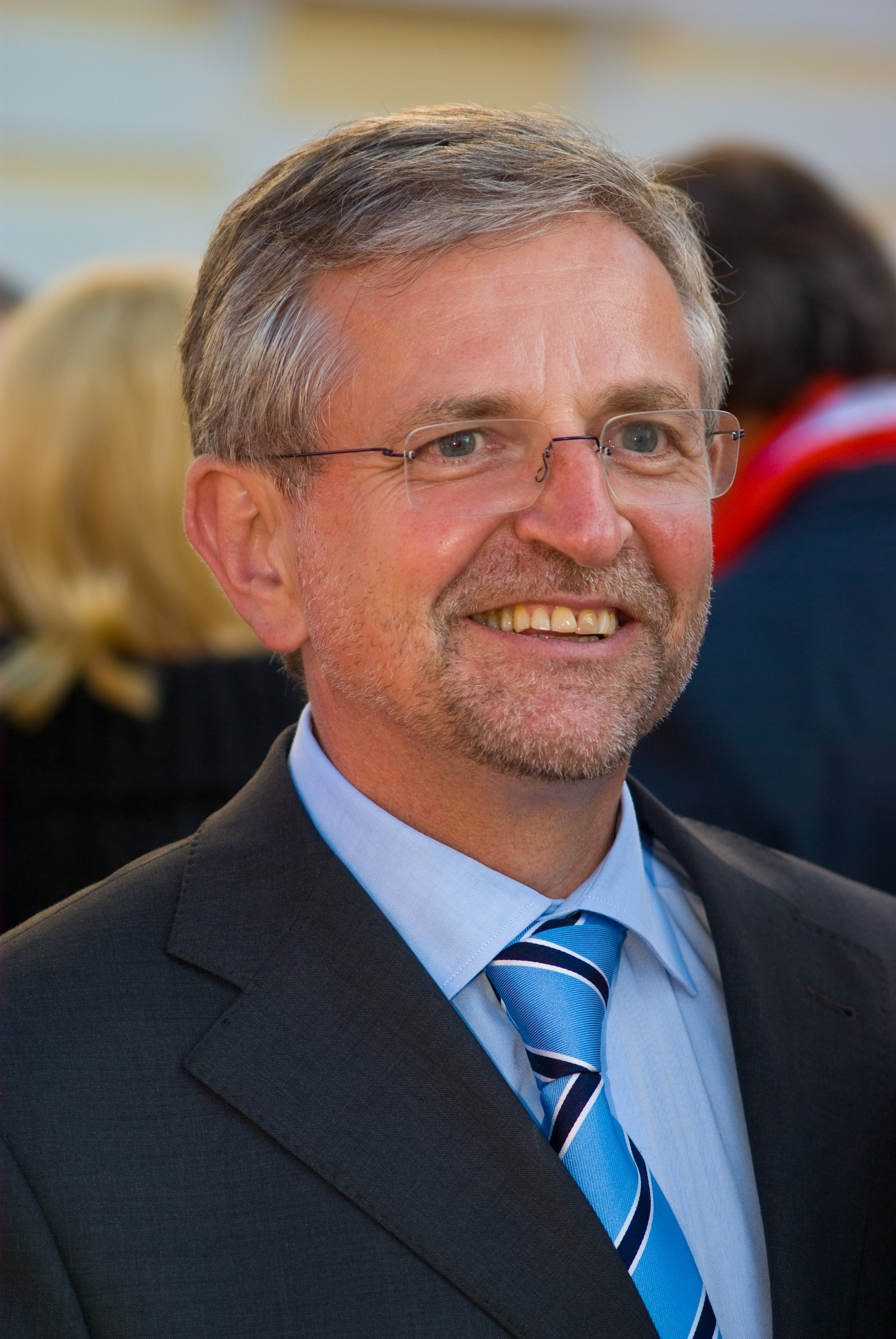

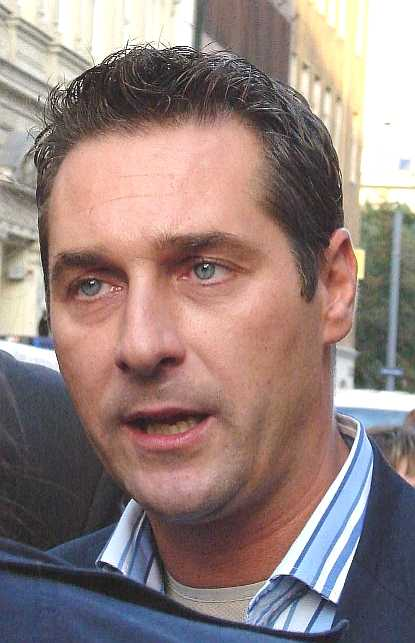

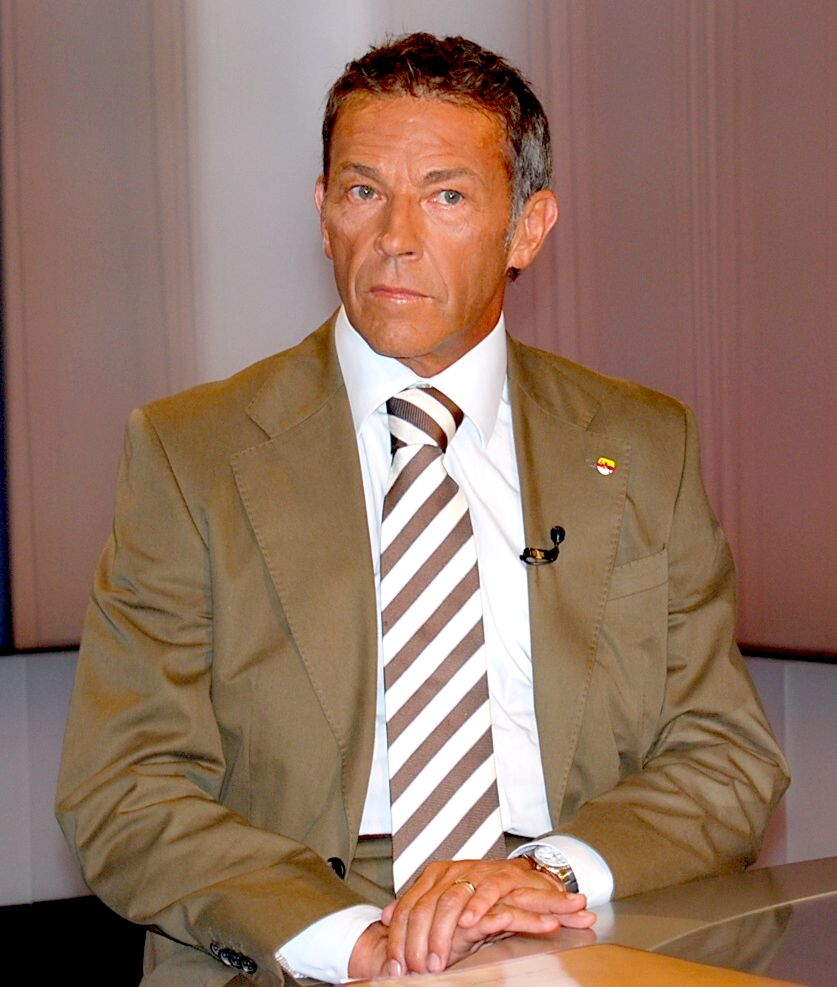

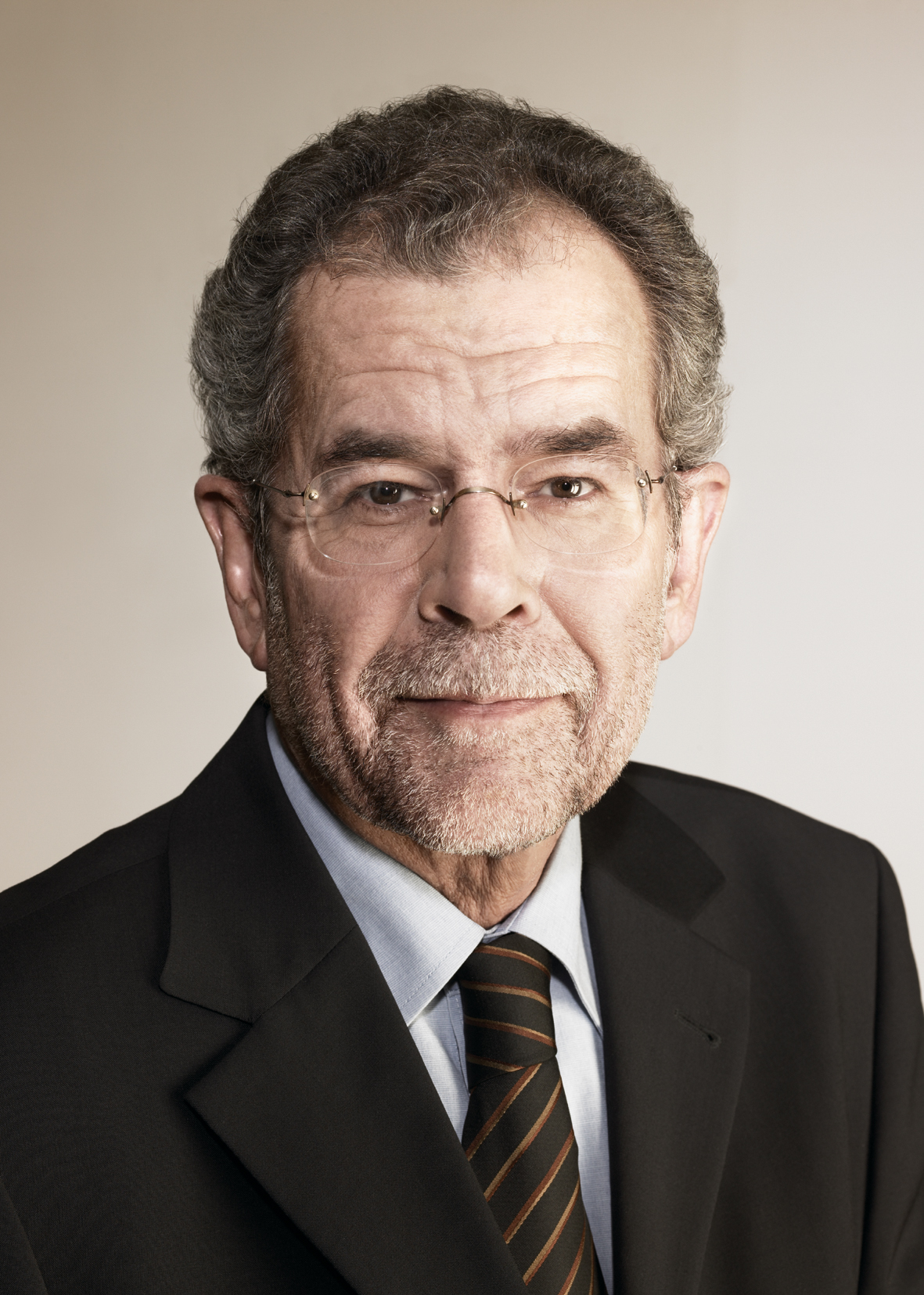

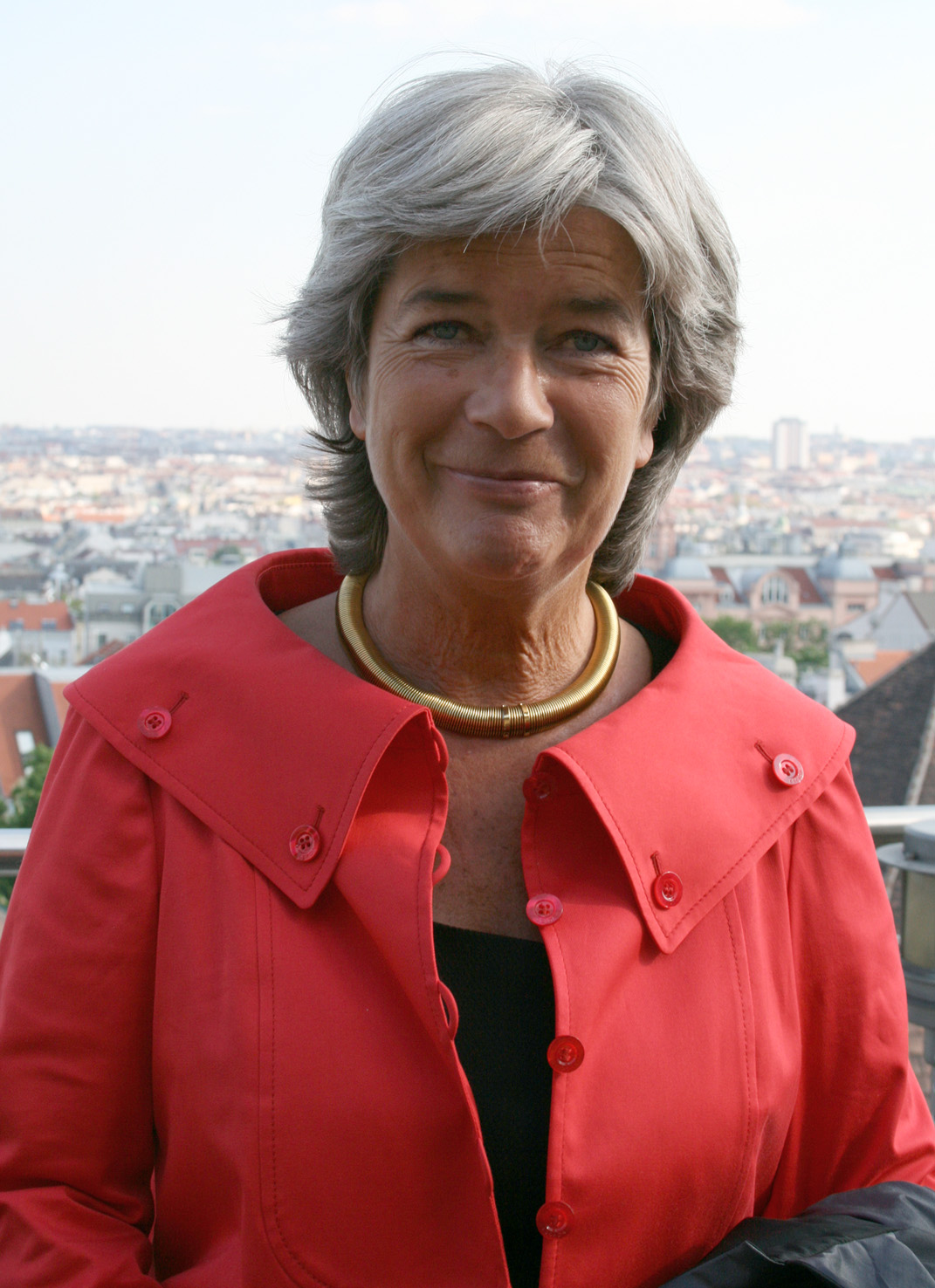
	First party	Second party	Third party
Leader	Werner Faymann	Wilhelm Molterer	Heinz-Christian Strache
Party	SPÖ	ÖVP	FPÖ
Leader since	2008	2007	2005
Leader's seat	9 Vienna	4D Traunviertel	9D Vienna South
Last election	68 seats, 35.34%	66 seats, 34.33%	21 seats, 11.04%
Seats won	57	51	34
Seat change	▼11	▼15	▲13
Popular vote	1,430,206	1,269,656	857,029
Percentage	29.26%	25.98%	17.54%
Swing	▼6.08%	▼8.35%	▲6.50%
	Fourth party	Fifth party	Sixth party
Leader	Jörg Haider	Alexander Van der Bellen	Heide Schmidt
Party	BZÖ	Greens	LiF
Leader since	2008	1997	2008
Leader's seat	2A Klagenfurt	9F Vienna North-West	9F Vienna North-West
Last election	7 seats, 4.11%	21 seats, 11.05%	did not contest on their own
Seats won	21	20	0
Seat change	▲14	▼1	0
Popular vote	522,933	509,936	102,249
Percentage	10.70%	10.43%	2.09%
Swing	▲6.59%	▼0.62%	▲2.09%
Chancellor before election
Alfred Gusenbauer
SPÖ
Elected Chancellor
Werner Faymann
SPÖ

A legislative snap election for the National Council in Austria was held on 28 September 2008. The previous election was held on 1 October 2006. The election (the 24th in Austrian history) was caused by the withdrawal of Austrian People's Party leader Wilhelm Molterer from the governing grand coalition (led by the Social Democratic Party of Austria) on 7 July 2008. Due to dissatisfaction with the grand coalition and the two main parties, it was widely expected to be a realigning election, with gains for the opposition and up to seven parties expected to be in the National Council after the election. The losses for the government parties (both the SPÖ and the ÖVP had the worst election result in history) resulted in strong gains for the far right, while neither the Liberal Forum nor the Citizens' Forum Austria (both of which were considered to have chances of gaining seats) gained as much as 2% of the vote, defying earlier expectations. The result of the election was seen as strong for the far-right and in support of Eurosceptics.

Molterer resigned as party chairman as a result of the losses suffered by the ÖVP and was replaced by environment minister Josef Pröll; the Greens' federal spokesman Alexander Van der Bellen (in office since 1997) also resigned and was replaced by his deputy, Eva Glawischnig. Due to the LIF's failure to enter parliament on its own, LIF founder Heide Schmidt and financier Hans-Peter Haselsteiner both declared their complete withdrawal from politics, and the LIF's fate was seen as uncertain. Shortly after the election, BZÖ leader and Carinthian governor Jörg Haider died in a car accident.

== Parties ==
=== Parliamentary parties ===
==== Social Democratic Party of Austria ====
The Social Democratic Party of Austria was led by infrastructure minister Werner Faymann and not by the incumbent chancellor Alfred Gusenbauer, as the party had decided to have a single person as party leader and leading candidate again. Faymann officially became party leader on 8 August 2008. The SPÖ announced it would not form a coalition with the FPÖ. On 20 July 2008, Faymann announced he would prefer it if Molterer would not be part of the next government, but also stated he was open to a new attempt at a grand coalition with new personalities; on 23 August 2008 he specifically mentioned agriculture minister Josef Pröll as his preferred partner. He reiterated his calls for a new grand coalition on 20 September 2008. Some members of the Carinthian SPÖ, most notably mayor of Villach Helmut Manzenreiter, were open to an SPÖ–FPÖ coalition, but the party base was strongly against this idea.

There were rumours that Gusenbauer would become foreign minister after the election, which were encouraged when he was frequently abroad during the time of the election campaign. There were also suggestions he would be nominated to become European Commissioner after the 2009 European Parliament election if the SPÖ won the legislative election. Both of these possible offices for Gusenbauer appeared to be unlikely after the election, however. Faymann announced on 20 September 2008 that he would like to regain the finance ministry from the ÖVP in the government to be formed after the election, and that education minister Claudia Schmied would be his preferred finance minister.

President Heinz Fischer (also from the SPÖ) said that he understood the need for early elections and stated that he would be open to three-party governments and minority governments (both of which would be a first in Austrian political history, but will likely be necessary to avoid another grand coalition). He also called for quick coalition negotiations.

In its election program, the SPÖ repeated its calls for abolishing university tuition fees and introducing a comprehensive school (Gesamtschule) for teenagers aged 10 to 14 instead of the early differentiation between Hauptschule and Gymnasium; it also called for providing all-day child care across the country, relief for lower and middle incomes and an additional increase of pensions to keep up with inflation.

SPÖ MP and university spokesman Josef Broukal announced his withdrawal from politics shortly after the election had been called over the second failed attempt to abolish university tuition fees. On 22 July 2008 SPÖ state secretary for infrastructure Christa Kranzl announced she would not stand in the election due to personal differences between her and Faymann and problems with support from her local party. An internet initiative called for her to remain in politics, and she stated on 21 August 2008 that she might reconsider her move if asked by Faymann to continue her work in government; on 4 September 2008 she announced that she had now changed her mind and would like to be part of the next government. Rudolf Parnigoni, Robert Rada, Anita Fleckl and Peter Marizzi, all SPÖ MPs, will also retire. Carinthian SPÖ chairwoman and state councillor Gaby Schaunig resigned from all of her offices, accusing governor Jörg Haider from the BZÖ of mobbing and insulting her; Reinhart Rohr officially replaced her on 23 August 2008. Long-time SPÖ MP Erwin Niederwieser announced on 29 July 2008 that he would retire. Justice minister Maria Berger announced on 4 August 2008 in an interview with the Kurier that she would like to remain in office after the election; while she said it would be easier to push through some reforms in a coalition other than the grand coalition, she was not against continuing the coalition, and even stated that she disagreed with the Greens on introducing same-sex marriage. Defence minister Norbert Darabos announced on 5 August 2008 that he would like to stay in office and warned against a revival of the ÖVP–FPÖ coalition.

Social minister Erwin Buchinger announced on 30 July 2008 that he would not stand for parliament; while he claimed that it would be up to Faymann whether he would stay on as social minister, it was rumoured that Faymann would choose someone from the Austrian Trade Union Federation as social minister instead, due to tradition and the need for reconciliation with the unions. While Buchinger stated on 2 August 2008 he was not tired of politics and was not at all ruling out staying on as social minister, president of the National Council Barbara Prammer (also SPÖ) said that possible successors for Buchinger as social minister would be Renate Csörgits, chairwoman of the social issues committee in the National Council, and family issues spokeswoman Andrea Kuntzl. On 3 August 2008, ÖVP social issues spokesman Werner Amon laid claim to the social ministry after the election, declaring that this would be an issue in coalition talks after the election; the SPÖ immediately denounced this claim. The Faction of Social Democratic Unionists (Fraktion Sozialdemokratischer Gewerkschafter), the SPÖ's union wing, also laid claims to the social ministry, although some union leaders stated that the incumbent Buchinger would also count as being from the unions, as his position and activities within the Public Employment Service Austria (Arbeitsmarktservice Österreich) were proof enough of his unionist mindset.

A number of important high-ranking former SPÖ officials and SPÖ supporters wrote an open letter to the SPÖ, which was published on 5 August 2008, in which they criticised the current course the SPÖ was taking under Faymann's leadership; Faymann rejected their criticism the following day.

==== Austrian People's Party ====
The Austrian People's Party went into the election with vice chancellor Wilhelm Molterer as its leader. The ÖVP stated it would try to form a three-party coalition before attempting another grand coalition, though some internal voices have dissented from that; the ÖVP did also not explicitly rule out a coalition with FPÖ or BZÖ, but stated that its coalition partners would have to be clearly supportive of the EU, thus strongly indicating a preference for a coalition with the Greens. Former ÖVP leader and former chancellor Wolfgang Schüssel stated on 1 August 2008 that he was against a coalition involving Faymann's SPÖ, but also claimed that there would be a "change of thinking" (Umdenken) in the SPÖ after the election. President of the Austrian Federal Economic Chamber Christoph Leitl, well known for his preference of the grand coalition, refused to state his preferences before the election. Some (especially ÖVP members in Vorarlberg) voiced their preference for another ÖVP–FPÖ coalition. Molterer stated on 5 August 2008 that he had nothing against three-party coalitions and would also consider a minority government.

Molterer was considered to be under strong internal pressure at the beginning of the election campaign; the party leaders from Lower Austria (Erwin Pröll), Upper Austria (Josef Pühringer) and Styria (Hermann Schützenhöfer) have all criticised his leadership at some point, though they later stated they had set their differences aside. In late August 2008, rumours surfaced according to which Molterer was planned to be replaced by agriculture minister Josef Pröll if the ÖVP lost the election, or even before the election if the polls continued to show a likely defeat for the ÖVP. The ÖVP (including Pröll himself) strongly denied these allegations.

ÖVP vice federal chairwoman, vice state chairwoman for Tyrol and former state councillor Elisabeth Zanon resigned all her party offices and even publicly considered renouncing her party membership after she was not confirmed as a Tyrolean state councillor in the new cabinet of former interior minister and new governor Günther Platter after the 2008 election in Tyrol, stating that the new political style was unacceptable to her. ÖVP MP and former state secretary for infrastructure Helmut Kukacka announced on 23 July 2008 that he would also stand down from politics and go into business instead. Carinthian ÖVP MP Klaus Auer also retired, stating his dislike for the current kind of politics in Carinthia (referring especially to Haider's populist actions). MPs Karl Freund, Walter Murauer and Edeltraud Lentsch will also retire. Health minister Andrea Kdolsky said she would like to stay on as minister and initially claimed that it had not yet been decided whether she would stand as a candidate on the ÖVP's lists, but later announced she would not stand on the party's lists. On 20 August 2008, it became apparent that Kdolsky would not serve any political function after the election, reportedly because of internal dissent over her popularity; she had reportedly been strongly lobbied by many party members to withdraw from politics. Economy minister Martin Bartenstein announced he would not be willing to stay as minister in a government led by Faymann, voicing preferences for an ÖVP–FPÖ–BZÖ coalition instead. When Faymann stated that he would lay claim to the foreign ministry for the SPÖ after the election in coalition negotiations, Schüssel strongly rebuked him on 5 September 2008, criticising the SPÖ's party line on the EU and on foreign affairs in general.

The only new point in the ÖVP's election program, presented on 31 August 2008, was the call for an income-contingent child benefit; the SPÖ, the Greens and the LIF were strongly in favour of the new proposal, while the FPÖ and the BZÖ were sceptical. Despite the support for the idea, it was considered unlikely that the proposed changes would be passed into law in the parliamentary sessions in September (see below). The ÖVP announced on 8 September 2008 that it would seek citizens' input on a number of campaign promises to which it would consider itself bound in coalition negotiations under a scheme which it called "citizens' contract" (Bürgervertrag); the performance of the ÖVP would be controlled by a "council of the wise" (Weisenrat). The ÖVP has stated it would like former president of the Court of Auditors Franz Fiedler as chairman of this council.

==== Freedom Party of Austria ====
The Freedom Party of Austria was led by Heinz-Christian Strache, who had criticised the snap elections and demanded the coalition partners should bear the administrative costs of the early elections. The FPÖ did not explicitly rule out a coalition with anyone, although it claimed the ÖVP was trying to "murder" it and the SPÖ was watching from the sidelines. Strache stated however that he did not want to work together with either Molterer or Faymann and that he hoped both large parties would lose enough votes to cause a change of party leadership. When other parties (ÖVP and Greens) announced plans to present lateral hires (Quereinsteiger) on their candidate lists, the FPÖ stated that it was against lateral hires out of principle. The FPÖ stated its goals were to become the third-largest party again and to become strong enough to break the two-thirds majority which SPÖ and ÖVP had held together since 1945. Secretary-general Vilismky claimed that parties which wished to enter into a coalition with the FPÖ after the election could not rule out do so before the election. Strache stated on 28 August 2008 he did not want to be part of an unstable three-party coalition and wanted to gain more than 15% of the votes. Analysts speculated that his refusal to be part of a three-party coalition was an attempt to destabilise the Austrian political system.

FPÖ MP Karlheinz Klement, who had been in the national media because of his repeated attacks on gender mainstreaming (which he called "gender madness", Gender-Wahnsinn) and homosexuality (which he referred to as "a culture of death", eine Kultur des Todes), was first put in a back-row place in the Carinthian candidate lists of the FPÖ and was later expelled on 31 July 2008 for "behaviour which could damage the party" (parteischädigendes Verhalten). Klement had twice been expelled from the FPÖ before 2008. Klement stated on 1 August 2008 that there were two factions in the Carinthian FPÖ: those who agreed with the federal FPÖ led by Strache and those who wanted to seek reunification with the BZÖ (with a minority reportedly in favour of cooperation with Dinkhauser). Klement did not rule out joining the BZÖ with his supporters. A split of the Carinthian FPÖ was not ruled out. Klement said he would take his expulsion to the courts and claimed he would bring the end of Strache and the Secretaries-General Vilimsky and Herbert Kickl. The FPÖ stated it was not afraid of Klement's threats, while the BZÖ said it was open to any people from the FPÖ who wished to join them. Klement submitted his own state candidate list (with Klement himself as leading candidate) to the state election agency (Landeswahlbehörde) with the signatures of Klement, BZÖ MP Sigisbert Dolinschek and independent and former FPÖ MP Ewald Stadler; Carinthian FPÖ leader Franz Schwager stated that he would submit his own list (with Harald Jannach as its leading candidate), and thus the state election agency will have to decide on 28 August 2008 which of the two candidate lists is the legitimate FPÖ list, unless Schwager and Klement arrive at an agreement before that; the other list will have then be considered as a separate list with a new name. Klement later announced he wanted to expel Strache and MEP Andreas Mölzer from the FPÖ for the same reason for which he was expelled; he stated he would certainly contest the election, with his own list if necessary, and wanted to reunify the FPÖ, the BZÖ and his group within the next two or three years. Klement and Stadler (see below) were officially expelled from the FPÖ's parliamentary group on 20 August 2008. The "official" FPÖ list in Carinthia was submitted on 22 August 2008; Schwager was confident that his list would be accepted as the FPÖ list in Carinthia, as all 26 candidates on the list were also on the FPÖ's federal candidate list, and stated as his goals to surpass the Greens and gain more than 10% of the votes. Klement announced on 25 August 2008 he had offered as a compromise to contest the election as the "List FREE" (Liste FREI) instead, with the full name "DI Karlheinz Klement – Non-party Freedom-minded List" (DI Karlheinz Klement – Parteilose, freiheitliche Liste), and the state election agency initially indicated it saw no problems with this proposal. However, on 28 August 2008 the state election agency unanimously decided to reject his request and to have him contest the election as "Dipl.-Ing. Karlheinz Klement" instead. Klement stated he was considering challenging the validity of the decision at the Constitutional Court and even challenging the election result.

In mid-September 2008, photos which allegedly show Strache participating in Wehrsportübungen (paramilitary training sessions and reenactments of combat situations, often with real weapons and considered to be an activity of far right and neo-Nazi groups) in the late 1980s resurfaced; the photos had originally been made public in early 2007, but News republished them with additional details visible, such as real weapons being used. The FPÖ denied all of these accusations and claimed that Strache was only participating in paintball games. The Greens strongly criticised Strache and some groups within the SPÖ called for his resignation.

==== Alliance for the Future of Austria ====
The Alliance for the Future of Austria was initially assumed to be led by Peter Westenthaler, but it was later announced that he would not be the leading candidate. Westenthaler's position was endangered as he was before the courts both for false testimony in a case dating back to 2006 and for personal injury of a policeman after a UEFA Euro 2008 match, where he hit a policeman with his car slightly injuring the policeman's knee. Westenthaler disdained all these investigations and claimed they were smear campaigns by SPÖ, ÖVP and/or FPÖ; he stated that it was his choice whether he would lead the BZÖ or whether somebody else would do it, and that the decision would be made by the end of July. A judgment on the issue of false testimony was handed down on 29 July 2008; Westenthaler faced up to three years' prison, but received a suspended sentence of nine months, which he appealed immediately. On the same day, it was announced that Westenthaler would not be the BZÖ's leading candidate. He would, however, be on the lists on a safe place and thus likely would remain an MP; he also announced he would remain party leader, although this was later contradicted. The BZÖ's reaction to the judgment (it claimed the judgment was politically motivated) was heavily criticised by the media, especially as the BZÖ's party program has a strong law and order character. Westenthaler's claims that he would also be the leading candidate in Vienna were criticised by one of the two factions in the Viennese BZÖ, who threatened to refuse to campaign for the BZÖ in case Westenthaler would be the Viennese leading candidate. The Viennese BZÖ split into two factions, both of which claimed to be the legitimate state boards; one of them (led by Viennese BZÖ leader Michael Tscharnutter) wanted to nominate Westenthaler as Viennese leading candidate, if he wanted to, while the other one (led by former Viennese BZÖ leader Günther Barnet) nominated former defence minister Herbert Scheibner and voted Tscharnutter out of office. An internal tribunal had decided on 2 June 2008 that Tscharnutter's faction was illegitimate; Barnet's faction was reported to have given in on 19 August 2008 in order to avoid weakening the party's stand in Vienna; Barnet denied these allegations on the same day. Westenthaler stated he needed a few days' respite before deciding whether to accept the position as leading candidate in Vienna; Scheibner would then be in second place on the Viennese lists. On 19 August 2008, it was announced that Scheibner would be the leading candidate in Vienna, with Westenthaler in second place.

Rumours that Carinthian governor Jörg Haider himself might be the leading candidate were initially denied. Deputy leader Stefan Petzner stated on 28 July 2008 that the leading candidate would be a "small sensation" and that his identity would be announced by mid-August. There were rumours that the leading candidate might be independent MP Ewald Stadler, who left the FPÖ and was formerly Volksanwalt. On 30 July 2008 Petzner stated he could "neither confirm nor deny" reports that Haider would be the leading candidate, but that Haider would certainly be more active in federal politics in the future. On 1 August 2008, FPÖ secretary-general Harald Vilismky strongly attacked Stadler.

It appeared on 2 August 2008 that Stadler's possible candidacy had possibly been a rumour deliberately circulated by the BZÖ in order to make it more of a surprise that Haider would be the leading candidate. Haider stated he would not be against becoming party leader, but emphasised that he would remain governor of Carinthia and would not become an MP, while not ruling out becoming the leading candidate, though he insisted that if so, he would become the BZÖ's "chancellor candidate"; Westenthaler at the same time stated Haider would become party leader and leading candidate, and claimed that 15% of the votes were possible with Haider as leading candidate. On 2 August 2008, Westenthaler stated he was considering a complete withdrawal from politics after handing over to his successor. Both Haider and Westenthaler said on the same day that they had talked with Stadler; Haider said it was up to Westenthaler to decide whether Stadler would be leading candidate or not, but that relations between him and Stadler had now bettered again, while Westenthaler stated that Stadler might be a candidate for the BZÖ but would not be leading candidate. In an interview Haider gave to Österreich on 3 August 2008, he confirmed he would be the leading candidate. The party would stand under the name "BZÖ – Jörg Haider's List" (BZÖ – Liste Jörg Haider), and Haider explicitly repeated that he would only be a chancellor candidate and that the second politician on the federal candidate list would become chief of the parliamentary club in the National Council, not him, and reopened speculation that Stadler might be the second leading candidate of the BZÖ. Petzner confirmed on the same date that Haider would officially become BZÖ leader and leading candidate on 30 August 2008; on that date, Haider was elected with 100% of the votes as the new BZÖ leader. In an interview with Österreich, Stadler stated on 5 August 2008 he would very much like to work together with Haider and stand on his lists, in an attempt to win over FPÖ voters and officials. Haider was officially announced to be the BZÖ's leading candidate on 14 August 2008. Stadler was confirmed to be running for the BZÖ (while officially remaining independent) on 16 August 2008.

The BZÖ was reportedly trying to convince a number of former ministers and state secretaries to return to politics, among them Elisabeth Sickl, Herbert Haupt and Ursula Haubner (all former social ministers). Former president of the Court of Auditors Franz Fiedler had also been contacted; while he did not stand on the BZÖ's lists, Haider claimed that Fiedler would be available as a minister. Former vice-chancellor Susanne Riess-Passer was also being lobbied to enter politics again, but she clearly stated she was not interested in any way. Former FPÖ member Ernest Windholz made a comeback as the BZÖ's leading candidate in Lower Austria. Former FPÖ Bundesgeschäftsführerin Martina Schenk joined the BZÖ (she claimed she was being treated unfairly in the FPÖ) and was officially presented as one of its candidates on 25 August 2008, and there were rumours that construction industry entrepreneur Richard Lugner (who had previously unsuccessfully contested the 1998 presidential and 1999 legislative elections with his party The Independents) might appear as a BZÖ candidate in Vienna, although this turned out to be a hoax on the same day.

On 8 September 2008, the BZÖ announced that Petzner would be second on the list, followed by Westenthaler, Stadler and Schenk.

BZÖ secretary-general Gerald Grosz announced that the party's goal was to gain at least 7% of votes, while Haider said he would like to double the BZÖ's votes from 4% to 8%. Haider later stated on 24 August 2008 he would like to become chancellor and would consider FPÖ leader Strache as his vice chancellor, and also claimed that the BZÖ would gain more than the 6–7% of the vote it was projected to receive at most by polls at that time.

==== The Greens – The Green Alternative ====
The Greens – The Green Alternative were led by long-time federal spokesman Alexander Van der Bellen. They stated that they were in favour of the snap election, as no work could be done in the current government; their main goal was to be strong enough to be a viable coalition partner for either of the two main parties. The Greens ruled out a coalition with the FPÖ and appear highly critical of a coalition including the BZÖ. Green politicians stated that the ÖVP would have to change in order for a black-green coalition to be a possibility from their side, especially regarding the abuse of power, the distribution of important offices to people closely related to the ÖVP, the illegal distribution of confidential data and other issues. In general, green politicians stated that they are interested in a black-green "experiment"; a red-green coalition was seen as more likely due to less differences on important issues between the two parties, but the SPÖ's new position on the EU was seen to be a problem. The Greens also stated they would like to cooperate with the LIF and did not rule out a coalition with Dinkhauser. After the ÖVP had started its election campaign, Van der Bellen criticised the xenophobic content of one of the election posters and declared it highly unlikely that a ÖVP–Greens coalition would be possible.

The Greens called for the reunification of the education ministry and the science and universities ministry, which had been split after the 2006 election, and announced that they would lay claim to such a merged ministry in coalitions negotiations.

Green MPs Sabine Mandak and Theresia Haidlmayr (the Greens' handicapped spokeswoman) had announced they would not stand in the election; Haidlmayr stated she had not chance to be selected by her party and that the Greens had now got different priorities than handicapped persons' rights and that they wanted fresh and younger faces on their candidate lists. She did not rule out being interested in becoming state secretary for handicapped people, but stated she would not seek the office at all costs. Chief secretary Michaela Sburny stated that she regretted Haidlmayr's decision, but denied claims that Haidlmayr had been denied a safe seat, as all candidate lists are decided by the whole membership of the Greens, thus rendering the granting or denying of a safe seat impossible. Another Green MP stated that there were no seats explicitly reserved for immigrants or handicapped people. MP and women and human rights spokeswoman Brigid Weinzinger was deselected by the Lower Austrian Greens, and youth issues spokeswoman Barbara Zwerschitz was also deselected.

Animal rights activists Martin Balluch, chairman of the Society against Animal Factories (Verein gegen Tierfabriken), and Sabine Koch of the Basis Group Animal Rights (Basisgruppe Tierrechte), who were remanded in custody on grounds of "founding a criminal organisation" together with eight other animal rights activists on 21 May 2008 after a razzia in the animal activist scene, which the Greens consider to be untenable (as the law under which they are held was meant to help combat mafia crime), stood on the Greens' candidate lists (Koch in Vienna, Balluch in the sixteenth place on the national list), although in places where they were not expected to gain a seat. The Greens were accused of supporting criminals with this decision (especially by the ÖVP and the BZÖ), but they argued that this was a question of principles and that the animal rights activists were not guilty of any crime. On 13 August 2008, one of the ten activists was released, and on 2 September 2008, the nine others were released from custody. The body of public prosecutors (Oberstaatsanwaltschaft, OStA) had decided that the reason for the detention, danger of suppression of evidence, was no longer valid; while the OStA claimed that danger of committing an offence was still given, they had to be released because of a possible disparity of means in the length of their detention should they be found to be innocent. The Greens welcomed their release, while the BZÖ accused the Greens and the SPÖ of having made a deal linking the release of the animal rights activists to the Greens' votes in favour of Faymann's measures against the rising prices. While Balluch had stated he would not rule out conducting a preference vote campaign in order to gain a seat in the National Council, this was not possible as preference votes can only be given on the regional and state level.

The Greens determine all of their candidate lists through voting of party members at party conventions; the federal convention on 7 September 2008 had to decide on who was placed in the first positions on the national list and would therefore enter parliament. Party leader Van der Bellen and vice-leader Eva Glawischnig were set to be placed in positions one and two; two immigrant women (Alev Korun from Turkey and Beatrice Achaleke from Cameroon) vied for third place (with Burgenland leading candidate Christiane Brunner and two minor candidates), and three long-time party members (security spokesman Peter Pilz, social issues spokesman Karl Öllinger and budget spokesman Bruno Rossmann) vied for places four and six. Pilz, a long-time MP and former party leader, threatened to withdraw from politics if he was not selected on the fourth place of the national candidate list; Öllinger was also on the Viennese list, but Pilz and Rossmann could only remain MPs if they were selected for safe positions on the national list. Pilz stated he would not vie for sixth place if rejected for fourth place. In the first round Korun got 42% and Achaleke 38%, with 19% for the three other candidates; Korun won against Achaleke in the run-off with 54% to 46%. Pilz was selected in the first vote with 51% to Öllinger's 35%, with Rossmann and a minor candidate both gaining 7%. Chief secretary Sburny lost the selection for fifth place against Burgenland leading candidate Brunner, youth and children issues spokeswoman Barbara Zwerschitz and two minor candidates (who already vied for third place) after three rounds of voting (34% to 31% to 25% to 11%, 44% to 36% to 20% and 59% to 41%); her defeat was likely due to strong criticism of the office cumulation, as she would have become both an MP and remained chief secretary. Öllinger, Rossmann and four minor candidates vied for sixth place, which Öllinger won in the first vote 52% to 28% to 18%. Helene Jarmer, president of the Austrian Alliance of the Deaf (Österreichischer Gehörlosenbund) was selected for the seventh place over the two minor candidates from before with 89%; Rossmann was selected for eighth place, Zwerschitz for ninth.

The Greens presented their new website on 25 August 2008.

=== Analyses and forecasts ===
Analysts and pollsters offered different opinions on whether smaller extraparliamentary parties had chances to enter parliament or not. According to some pollsters, the FRITZ had very good chances of getting into parliament, and the LIF with its founder Schmidt as its leading candidate, as well; the conditions were as good as they had never been before for smaller parties, according to some. Analysts agreed that apart from LIF and FRITZ, all others would fail to enter parliament. Analysts furthermore asserted that the candidacy of the FRITZ would likely make the race for third place between Greens and FPÖ very competitive, as the FRITZ would likely gain protest votes which would otherwise go to the FPÖ. The critical time for the extraparliamentary parties was stated to be the very first phase of the campaign, when the larger parties had not yet really started campaigning and the smaller parties had a chance to gain publicity.

Following the announcement that Haider would return to federal politics, analysts held different opinions on the likely effects of this change. While the race for swing voters between ÖVP, FPÖ and BZÖ was seen to intensify, it was also remarked that Haider has lost much of his appeal and that it would be unlikely that the BZÖ would increase its share of votes just because of his candidacy. The race for third place between the Greens and the FPÖ was seen to be balanced (as Haider might draw votes from the FPÖ and the LIF from the Greens) or slightly in favour of the Greens. One analyst even expected that Haider would attempt to get the FPÖ to adopt a partner relationship with the BZÖ (similar to the Christian Democratic Union–Christian Social Union of Bavaria alliance in Germany), with the BZÖ only operating in Carinthia and the FPÖ in the rest of Austria, after the 2008 election. Stadler confirmed that this was the goal of the BZÖ. Strache explicitly ruled out such an alliance on 7 September 2008.

Four weeks before the election, analysts agreed that the climate was very good for the SPÖ following Faymann's announcement that he would take measures against rising prices, although they also cautioned that the SPÖ's victory was not yet a done deal. The FPÖ was seen as strongly increasing their share of the votes when compared to the 2006 election and the BZÖ was seen as having secured its stay in the National Council. The Greens were seen to be stagnating, while the extraparliamentary parties faced difficulties with entering parliament, with the chances of LIF and the FRITZ intact.

Former ÖVP leader Wolfgang Schüssel claimed on 4 September 2008 the ÖVP's low numbers in the polls were due to the large number of parties contesting the election and denied that the ÖVP had made mistakes in their election campaign so far. Analysts asserted that the Greens' decision to strongly support the animal rights activists remanded in custody under controversial circumstances (see above) might be risky, but that it might pay off through the increased publicity and mobilisation of core voters.

Only four possible coalitions were seen as likely to have a majority after the election: SPÖ–ÖVP, ÖVP–FPÖ–BZÖ, SPÖ–GRÜNE–BZÖ and SPÖ–FPÖ–BZÖ; all but a new grand coalition were seen as unlikely.

=== Parties' status ===
Contesting the election

- Social Democratic Party of Austria
- Austrian People's Party
- The Greens – The Green Alternative
- Freedom Party of Austria
- Alliance for the Future of Austria
- Liberal Forum
- Citizens' Forum Austria
- Communist Party of Austria
- Save Austria
- The Christians
- Left (Burgenland, Salzburg, Tyrol, Upper Austria, Vienna)
- Animal Rights Party (Vienna)
- Karlheinz Klement (Carinthia)
- List Strong (Carinthia)

Failed to gather the required signatures

- Black-Yellow Alliance
- Pirate Party of Austria
- Solidary Culture of Austria
- Humans Austria
- WE
- Democratic Diversity of Austria
- plattform-direkt.at (Vienna)
- The Whites of Austria
- I DON'T VOTE
- Certainly – Absolutely – Independent (Carinthia)

Declined to run

- Hans-Peter Martin's List
- Neutral Free Austria
- Party3
