= Karl-Heinz Grasser =

Austrian politician (born 1969)

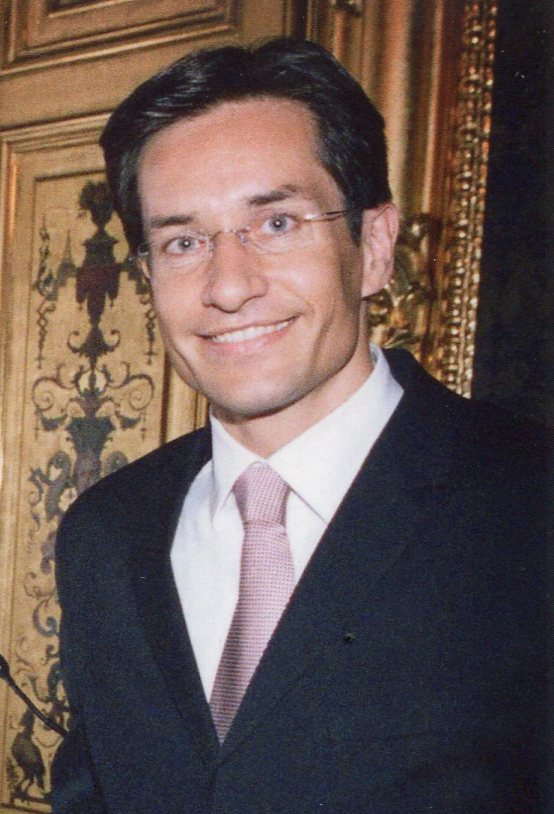
- Grasser in 2004

Minister of Finance
- In office 4 February 2000 – 11 January 2007
- Chancellor: Wolfgang Schüssel
- Preceded by: Rudolf Edlinger
- Succeeded by: Wilhelm Molterer

Personal details
- Born: Karl-Heinz Grasser; January 2, 1969 (age 57) Klagenfurt, Carinthia, Austria
- Party: Freedom Party (until 2003), People's Party (affiliated)
- Spouse: Fiona Swarovski (m. 2005)
- Children: 1
- Education: University of Klagenfurt

Karl-Heinz Grasser (born 2 January 1969) is an Austrian businessman and former politician who was the Austrian Finance Minister (2000–2007) under Chancellor Wolfgang Schüssel. Grasser is known for his involvement in several corruption scandals during his time as finance minister. In 2020, Grasser was sentenced to 8 years in prison for corruption. In March 2025, the Austrian Supreme Court of Justice upheld the conviction, but reduced the sentence to 4 years in prison.

== Early life ==
Grasser was born in Klagenfurt, Austria on January 2, 1969. His parents ran a car dealership in Carinthia and were active in the far right nationalist Austrian Freedom Party (FPÖ), which Grasser later joined. He studied business administration at the University of Klagenfurt from 1988 to 1992.

== Career ==
=== Early political career (1992–1998) ===
In 1992, Grasser joined the FPÖ under the mentorship of Jörg Haider and became the party's General Secretary in 1993. In 1994, he became the second deputy governor of Carinthia. In 1998, Grasser temporarily left politics after a dispute with Haider to work for Magna Europa as a vice president.

=== Minister of Finance (2000–2007) ===
In 1999, Grasser returned to politics during the 1999 Austrian legislative election and was appointed finance minister, when a coalition was formed between the Austrian People's Party (ÖVP) and FPÖ in 2000. He became the youngest minister of finance ever to hold office in Austria.

Political infighting within the FPÖ between the more liberal coalition members and the traditional nationalist right wing members of the party led to the Knittelfeld Putsch in February 2002, in which a member of the right wing torn up a compromise between Vice Chancellor and party chair Sussanne Riess and Haider. In response, Grasser along with Riess and Peter Westenthaler resigned from their posts and early elections were called by Wolfgang Schüssel. When national elections in November 2002 ended with favorable results for the ÖVP, the coalition between ÖVP and FPÖ was reestablished. Grasser was reappointed finance minister, this time being nominated by the ÖVP. In 2003, Grasser officially left the FPÖ. He remained as finance minister in the second Schüssel cabinet until ÖVP's defeat in the 2006 Austrian legislative election and the creation of a new government.

=== Departure from politics and business ventures (2007–) ===
On 9 January 2007, Grasser announced his departure from politics to return to the private sector.

On June 13, 2007, Grasser alongside businessman Julius Meinl V and Verbund ex-CEO, Hans Haider, announced they would become partners in the new energy investment company Meinl International Power. In the same year, Grasser was elected to the supervisory board of investment company C Quadrat and joined Valora Solutions, a lobbying group, founded by FPÖ politician Walter Meischberger. Grasser left Valora Solutions by November 2008.

In April 2009, Grasser sold his shares in Meinl International Power after the arrest of Meinl. In June 2009, Grasser founded the real estate company GPS. Grasser left this company in January 2011.

On September 27, 2010, Grasser resigned from his position as chairperson and board member of C Quadrat's supervisory board, citing personal reasons.

== Corruption trials and conviction ==
Meanwhile, in January 2011, new and continuing investigations by Austrian district attorneys into suspicions of kickback schemes and backroom deals and, in certain cases, alleged manipulation of federal spending figures to syphon money to his allies have brought Grasser in front of the Austrian media once more. These reports have been spearheaded by the Vienna weekly Der Falter. More details on the allegations can be found on Wikipedia in German. Grasser maintains his innocence on all counts.

Regardless of the outcome of the large number of court cases filed by district attorneys against Grasser and by Grasser against individuals), it seems clear that his public image as the "new-and-squeaky-clean" politician of a new era has been tarnished once and for all. After Green MP Gabriela Moser and Falter published transcripts of police recordings of Grasser's telephone conversations with one of his friends, Walter Meischberger, in which Meischberger could not describe the services for which he was paid hundreds of thousands of euros by the Porr construction company, the phrase "Was war meine Leistung?" (What was my service [for that payment]?) entered popular usage. Falter arranged a public reading of the transcripts by a group of comedians.

In Austrian quality newspapers, Grasser's case is now seen as a test of credibility for the Austrian judicial system: the legal protection from prosecution of former politicians is confronted with rumours about Grasser's alleged quagmire of corruption. It will be seen if the Austrian judicial system is up to the task. At present, in an interview by Grasser with the Austrian radio station Ö1 on 22 January 2011, Grasser threatened to sue anyone who criticized his behaviour. "Nothing will come of [any law suit against me]", Grasser said. Instead, he is suing a number of people and announcing that he will sue others.

On 5 May 2011, new allegations have to come to light. The magazine Format quotes from police reports that Grasser, between 2005 and 2007 during his tenure as finance minister of the Republic of Austria, on three occasions personally carried "cases of cash" from Switzerland to Austria. Grasser said that the money was given to him, in cash, by his future mother in law, heiress to the Swarovski Crystal company, a claim she denies.

On 26 May 2011, Austrian Finance police searched ten of Grasser's private and business dwellings on suspicion of embezzling up to 3 million euro from the Austrian tax system during and after his time as finance minister. Finance police removed 35 boxes of files, computers and mobile phones. If found guilty, Grasser would face up to ten years in federal prison, would have to pay back the money and face hefty fines in the million euro range (as a percentage of the non-declared income). Grasser, who was abroad at the time of the searches, maintains his innocence. Delivering messages via his attorney to the Austrian media, Grasser describes the case as a "politically motivated act".

As of 27 May 2011, the Austrian judiciary has not launched a court challenge against Grasser. Already, this affair has become one of the most opaque and dubious money and embezzlement schemes in the public eye. In August 2013, new details have come to light. Gernot Rumpold, Grasser's friend and Freedom party associate, was sentenced to 3 years in federal prison for embezzlement charges (the ruling can still be appealed).

The Austrian monthly magazine Format, cites police investigation reports that links Grasser not just to the 500,000 Euros he confessed to bringing, in a suitcase, across the border to Liechtenstein during his tenure as Austrian Federal Minister of Finance, but to a total of 1.6 million Euro that were found in offshore bank accounts (allegedly, as Grasser claims, to make an investment "for his mother-in-law"). In August 2013, Austrian finance police has expressed serious doubt as to the source of the 20 cash transfers amounting to the 1.6 million Euros now identified by Austrian police after almost five years of investigation. The irregularities and sums involved, the fact that substantial sums were directed—always via offshore and Liechtenstein bank accounts or in suitcases—in highly complex investment constructions linked to dummy companies seems to point towards a mesh of corruption and embezzling that might become one of the biggest personal corruption scheme in post-WWII Austria.

On 22 August 2013, the magazine Format and Austrian daily newspaper Der Standard reported on Grasser potentially facing up to 10 years in prison for tax evasion and tax fraud, in addition to fines that may amount up to 20 million Euros. It has been unheard of in post-WWII Austria that a former minister would potentially face such stiff sentencing, though, after five years of painstaking research into Grasser's complex of mailbox companies in offshore locations and in Liechtenstein (which is independent from the Austrian judicial system) by the Austrian Federal Financial Police, Grasser's explanation that he did not understand the constructions but followed the advice of his accountant, seem, given his background in Finance and his role as Austrian Finance Minister, doubtful.

In December 2020 he was sentenced to 8 years in prison.

In March 2025, his conviction was finally confirmed by the Supreme Court of Justice (OGH), but his sentence was reduced to 4 years. Grasser wants to appeal to the European Court for Human Rights. On June 6, 2025, Grasser began his sentence at the Innsbruck Correctional Facility.

== Personal life ==
In the 2000s, Grasser was engaged to his former intern, Natalia Corrales-Diez, while having a highly publicized affair with Fiona Swarovski. In March 2005, Corrales-Diez crashed her car and was hospitalized after being told by Grasser of his relationship with Swarovski. Grasser and Corrales-Diez ended their engagement later in March. On October 22, 2005, Grasser and Swarovski married in a private ceremony in Weißenkirchen. They have one daughter together, Tara Gertrud, born on September 3, 2007.

On October 26, 2006, Austrian police thwarted an attempt to kidnap Grasser and Swarovski.

Political offices
Preceded by Rudolf Edlinger	Finance Minister of Austria; 2000–2007	Succeeded by Wilhelm Molterer
