= Josef Bucher =

Austrian politician

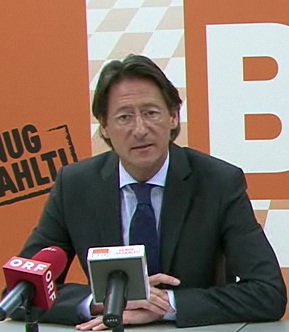
Josef Bucher

National Council
- In office October 2008 – December 2013

Leader of the Bündnis Zukunft Österreich (BZÖ)
- In office 26 April 2009 – 2 October 2013
- Preceded by: Herbert Scheibner
- Succeeded by: Gerald Grosz

Personal details
- Born: 19 August 1965 (age 61) Friesach
- Party: Bündnis Zukunft Österreich

Josef Bucher (born 19 August 1965) is an Austrian politician and former leader of the Alliance for the Future of Austria (BZÖ) as well as former Member of Parliament for the party. Divorced with two children, Bucher is a hotel owner.

After the death of BZÖ chairman Jörg Haider, Bucher was elected Klubobmann, chairman of the party's parliamentary grouping on 22 October 2008. Initially, Stefan Petzner, Haider's designated successor as party chairman, was expected to be elected to that post as well. Petzner had to pass the leadership over to former vice-chairman Herbert Scheiber. His replacement as party leader was widely interpreted as the result of the rising criticism of Petzner's former media appearances.

Both Petzner and Scheibner were elected two of five vice chairmen of the party (the other 3 being Stadler the European Parliament future leading candidate of the party, Haider's sister Haubner and former party leader of the BZÖ Westenthaler).

On 26 April 2009 at the party congress in Linz, Bucher was elected as the new leader of the party.

On 30 January 2010 after the secession of the party officials and members from the Carinthian party, Bucher was elected Chairman of the newly formed Carinthian BZÖ.

In a reaction about the issue that 10 per cent of Austrians own nearly 60 per cent of the country's private assets, Bucher criticised in an interview 2011 that further lack of reforms by the Austrian Federal Government would create new poverty in the middle class.

On 18 April 2012 Josef Bucher stated in further cases of market manipulation and reckless car petrol price increases by businesspeople in the energy sector prison terms were needed as a stricter penalty against the leading entrepreneurs.

In October 2012 Josef Bucher demanded in parliament for a flat tax with 39% as an income tax quota for all income-earners over €14,793.09 per annum and 10% for all between Geringfügigkeitsgrenze (marginal employment border) and the €14,993.09 threshold per annum.

Josef Bucher stepped down as BZÖ party leader after BZÖ lost all seats in parliament in the 2013 legislative election.

Party political offices
Preceded by Herbert Scheibner (acting)	BZÖ Party Chairman; 2009–2013	Succeeded by Gerald Grosz
