= Susanne Riess =

Austrian politician (born 1961)

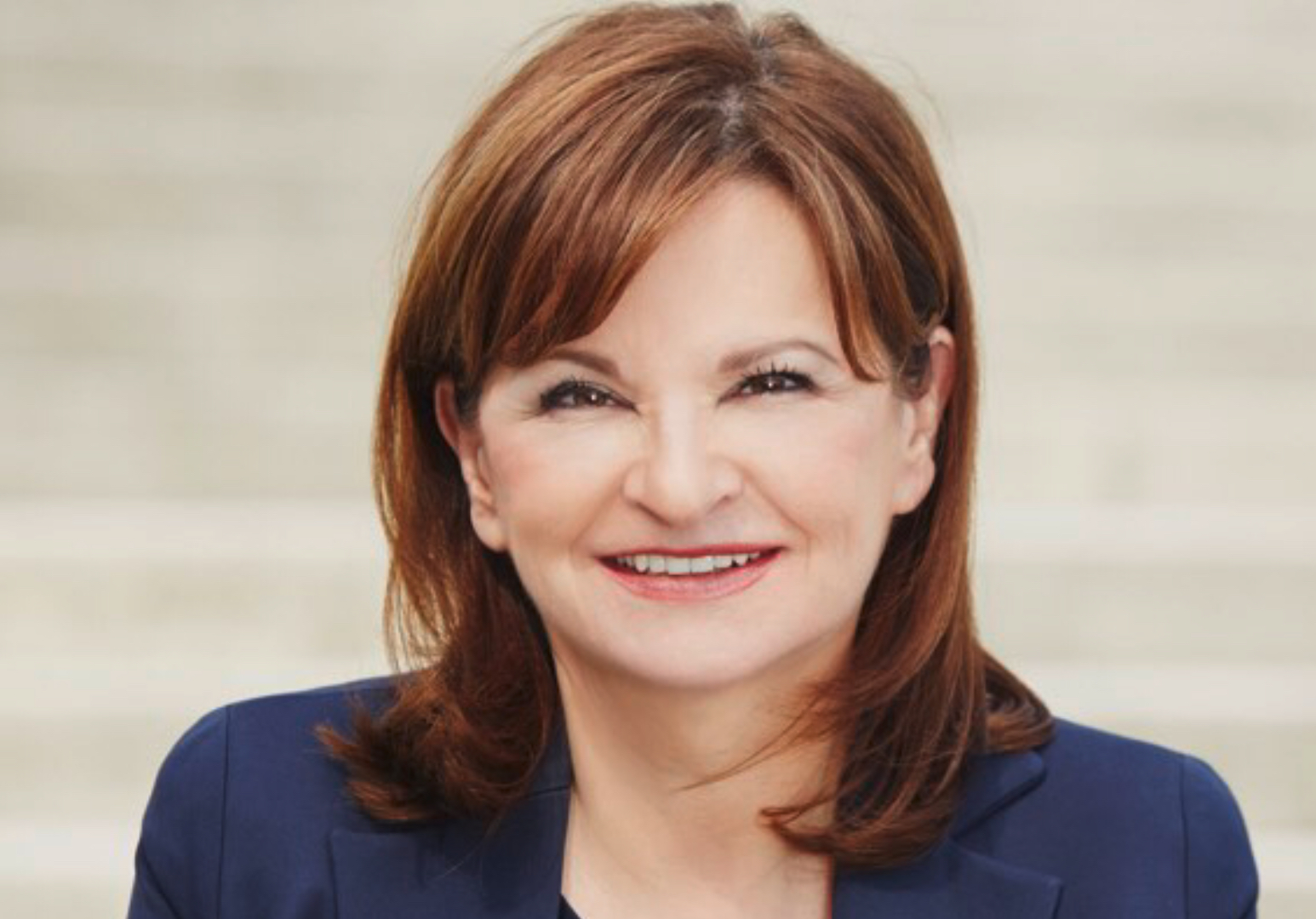
- Riess in 2019

Vice-Chancellor of Austria
- In office 4 February 2000 – 28 February 2003
- Chancellor: Wolfgang Schüssel
- Preceded by: Wolfgang Schüssel
- Succeeded by: Herbert Haupt

Minister of Sport
- In office 3 April 2000 – 28 February 2003
- Chancellor: Wolfgang Schüssel
- Preceded by: Franz Morak
- Succeeded by: Karl Schweitzer

Chair of the Freedom Party
- In office 1 May 2000 – 8 September 2002
- Preceded by: Jörg Haider
- Succeeded by: Mathias Reichhold

Personal details
- Born: 3 January 1961 (age 64); Braunau am Inn, Austria
- Political party: Freedom Party
- Spouse: Johannes Hahn (m. 2022)

Susanne Riess (born 3 January 1961 in Braunau am Inn) is a former Austrian politician of the Freedom Party of Austria (FPÖ). Riess-Passer is now CEO of the Wüstenrot-Gruppe.

== Career ==
In the first government headed by Chancellor Wolfgang Schüssel, which was inaugurated in 2000, she became Vice Chancellor and minister of public services and sports, representing her party in the coalition with Schüssel's Austrian People's Party (ÖVP). The Freedom Party had finished second in the 1999 election, so its leader, Jörg Haider, should have become Chancellor in any coalition with the ÖVP which finished third. However, Haider yielded to Schüssel in order to appease international opinion. Although this should have put him in line to become Vice-Chancellor, he realised he was too controversial to have any role in the government. He thus resigned as party leader in favour of Riess-Passer, who had been FPÖ managing chairwoman since 1996.

In the course of the formation of the government in 2000, she became chairwoman and leader of the FPÖ. She was known for being loyal to Haider, which earned her the nickname Königskobra (King Cobra).

After severe disagreements with her former political mentor Haider in Summer 2002 (the so-called Knittelfeld Putsch), she resigned from all of her posts, as did finance minister Karl-Heinz Grasser and the party spokesman in parliament, Peter Westenthaler. After the 2002 elections, she remained Vice Chancellor on a provisional basis until the coalition between ÖVP and FPÖ was renewed in early 2003, and has since had no involvement in politics.

Since 2004, Riess-Passer has been the CEO of the Wüstenrot-Gruppe. Riess-Hahn was also on the advisory board of the later bankrupt Signa Holding.

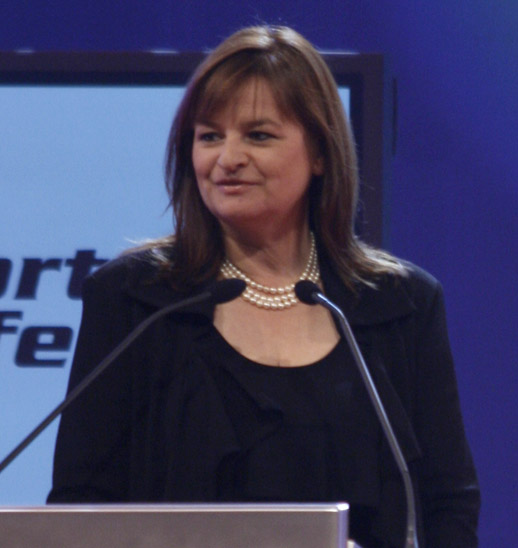
Susanne Riess (2008)

== Personal life ==
In 2022 she married European Commissioner Johannes Hahn.

Political offices
Preceded by Wolfgang Schüssel	Vice Chancellor of Austria; 2000–2003	Succeeded by Herbert Haupt
Party political offices
Preceded by Jörg Haider	Chair of the Freedom Party; 2000–2002	Succeeded by Mathias Reichhold
