= Schaunig =

Schaunig is a surname. Notable people with the surname include:

- Gaby Schaunig (born 1965), Austrian lawyer and politician
- Maike Schaunig (born 1996), German field hockey player
