= Fiona Swarovski =

Swiss entrepreneur

- Born: Fiona Winter; January 21, 1965 (age 61); Basel, Switzerland
- Occupations: Entrepreneur, Fashion Designer, Personal Stylist
- Known for: Heiress of Swarovski
- Spouse: Karl-Heinz Grasser
- Relatives: Daniel Swarovski (great-grandfather)

Fiona Swarovski (born January 21, 1965, as Fiona Winter) is an Austrian-Italian-Swiss entrepreneur, fashion designer and personal stylist.

== Biography ==
Fiona Swarovski was born in Basel, Switzerland. She is a descendant of Swarovski Group founder Daniel Swarovski from her mother's side. She is the director of Fiona Winter Studio in Milan.

Swarovski married her current husband, Austrian politician and former finance minister, Karl-Heinz Grasser in October 2005.

In October 2006, Austrian police thwarted a kidnapping plot involving her and Grasser.
