= Gabriela Moser =

Austrian politician (1954–2019)

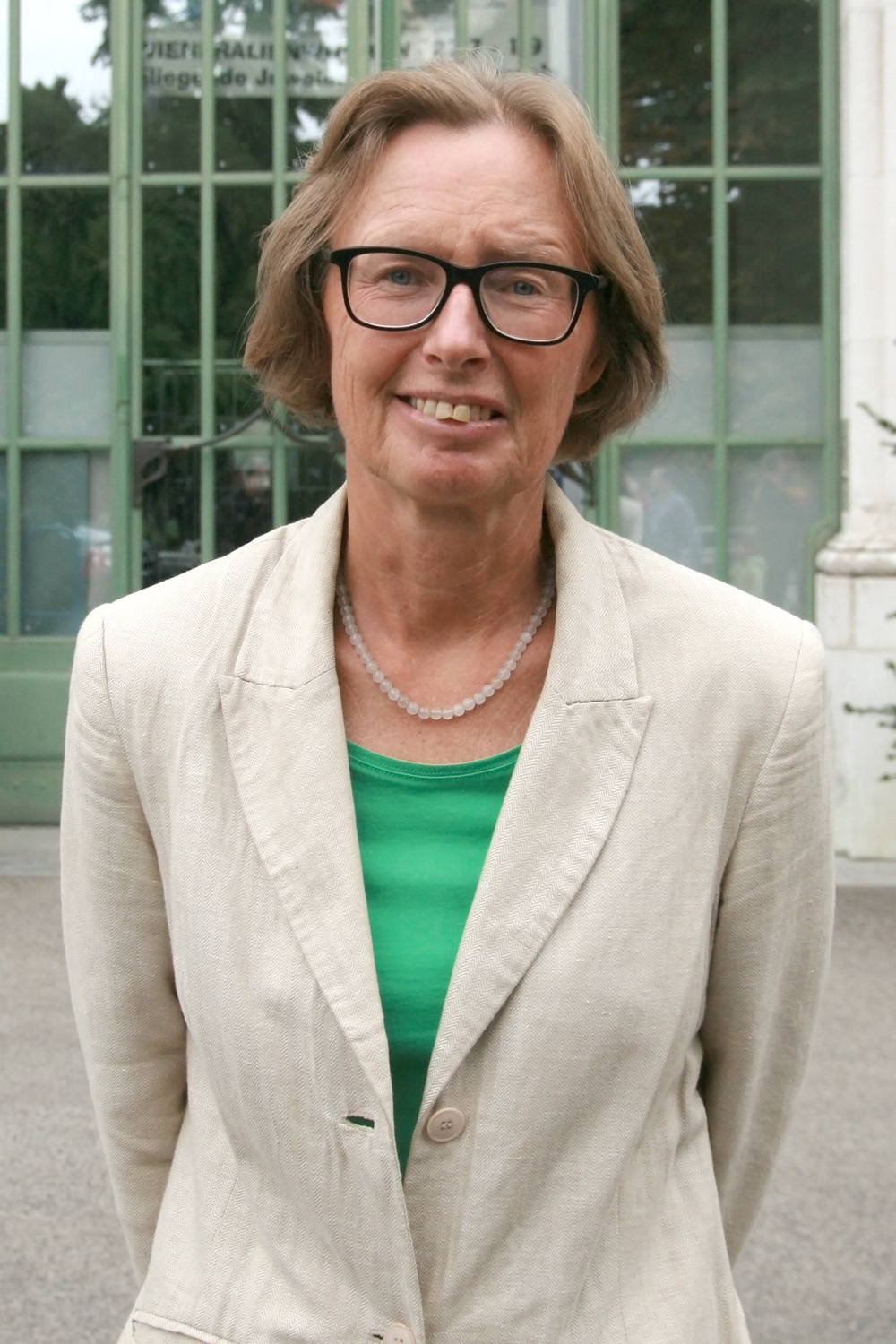
Moser in 2013

Gabriela Moser (28 July 1954 – 12 March 2019) was an Austrian politician who was a member of the National Council for more than 20 years.

== Politics ==
Moser, an early member of The Greens – The Green Alternative, was first elected to the city council of Linz in the 1980s.

She won a seat on the National Council of Austria in the 1994 Austrian legislative election, vacated her seat briefly, and then rejoined parliament in 1997. She remained a member until the Greens lost all their seats in the 2017 election.

Moser was best known for her work fighting corruption. A parliamentary committee led by her investigated the Telekom affair involving Telekom Austria, and the Tetron affair which concerned the creation of a radio system for emergency services. Moser helped uncover the BUWOG affair which former finance minister Karl-Heinz Grasser was involved in. Moser also investigated the Skylink scandal surrounding the construction of Vienna International Airport's Terminal 3, and allegations of corruption at the Austrian Federal Railways.

In 2018, Moser worked for the party academy of JETZT, a party that had split from the Greens in 2017.

== Personal life ==
Moser was born in 1954 in Linz, where she later taught German and history at a gymnasium. For environmental reasons, she did not own a car. She was married to a German physicist and had no children.

In 2005, she received the Grand Decoration of Honour in Gold for Services to the Republic of Austria.

Moser died on 12 March 2019, at the age of 64, due to an illness she had been fighting for two years.
