= Knittelfeld Putsch =

Knittelfeld Putsch refers to a conference of the Freedom Party of Austria (FPÖ) which took place on 7 September 2002 in the small Austrian town of Knittelfeld, Styria, called due to political differences within the party leadership. The events resulted in early federal elections in the same year.

== Background ==
Following the 1999 elections, the FPÖ became part of a coalition government led by ÖVP leader Wolfgang Schüssel, despite the FPÖ having garnered the larger number of votes.

During the summer of 2002, tension rose within the FPÖ, following losses in several local elections. Jörg Haider, former FPÖ leader and still Landeshauptmann of Carinthia, called for changes in government policy to reinvigorate the party's popularity, especially a tax reform. However, such a reform was out of reach in view of the catastrophic flood of August 2002.

== Events at Knittelfeld ==
On September 7, a party meeting was held at Knittelfeld, but the party chair and Vice Chancellor of Austria at that time, Susanne Riess-Passer, was not present. Most of the functionaries attending represented the opposition within the FPÖ of its traditional nationalist right wing.

The key symbolic moment of the meeting was a public tearing of a compromise paper between Riess-Passer and Haider by the Carinthian delegate Scheuch (some witnesses report that Haider instructed Scheuch to publicly tear the paper, so even though it was Scheuch who actually tore the paper up, it was Haider in reality who was engaging in the destruction of the accord). The following day, Riess-Passer, Minister of Finance Karl-Heinz Grasser (who was later reappointed in this position by the ÖVP) and the chairman of the FPÖ parliamentary club, Peter Westenthaler, announced their resignation, as did some other relatively pragmatic functionaries. Chancellor Wolfgang Schüssel then renounced the coalition pact, which led to early elections being called, where the FPÖ lost approximately two thirds of its voters of 1999 and fell from 26.9% of the public vote to 10.0%.

== Symbolic meaning ==
Since that time in the Austrian media the term "Knittelfelder" has been used to refer to party rebels in the FPÖ. You can also refer simply to "Knittelfeld" to refer to the events of the congress.

== Aftermath ==
The coalition between ÖVP and FPÖ was renewed after the elections in spite of the FPÖ's weak showing at the polls. As the FPÖ continued to lose even more dramatically in subsequent local and also the 2004 European elections, tensions did not subside. In April 2005, Jörg Haider founded the Alliance for the Future of Austria (BZÖ), a new party, this time with the more pragmatic wing of the party, including all current FPÖ members of the federal government and most of the FPÖ's parliamentary representatives. Since then the BZÖ obtained 4.1% of the vote in the 2006 general election and got 7 seats in the National Council. The FPÖ rose from 10% to 11% in that election. Since then the FPÖ grew again, receiving 10.5% in the 2008 Lower Austria "Landtag" (provincial) election, more than doubling its 2003 result (4.5%). The BZÖ also participated in the Lower Austria election, but received only 0.72%, failing to pass the 4% threshold.

== See also ==
- Austria legislative election, 2002
