= Stefan Petzner =

Austrian politician

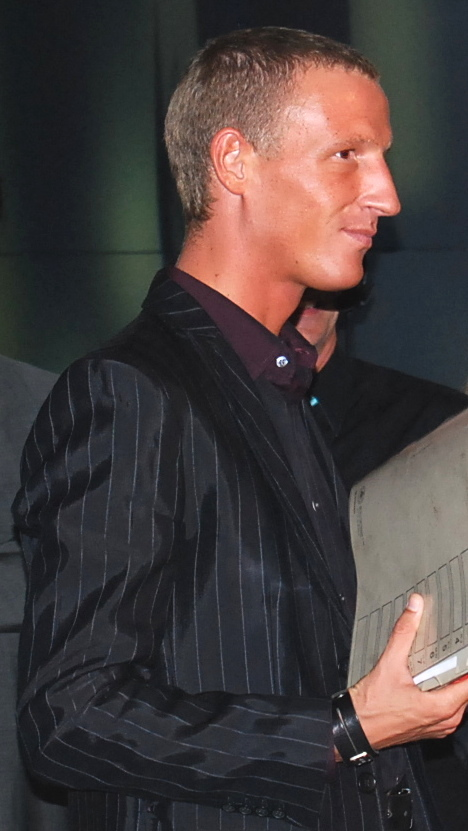
Petzner in 2008

Stefan Petzner (born 17 January 1981) is an Austrian politician. He was a member of the right-wing Alliance for the Future of Austria (Bündnis Zukunft Österreich, BZÖ). Petzner is a former reporter (of the Styrian Kleine Zeitung) and a student of journalism. Petzner directed the election campaigns in 2006 and 2008. In 2008 Petzner was appointed secretary general of the BZÖ.

== Jörg Haider ==
After Jörg Haider's death in a car accident on 11 October 2008, the party's executive committee nominated Petzner to succeed as party chairman. In an interview on the same day Petzner declared in tears that Jörg Haider was his "Lebensmensch", i.e. the "person of his life".

On 19 October 2008, Petzner announced that he and Haider had been having "a relationship that went far beyond friendship" with the full knowledge of Haider's wife, Claudia. The Associated Press reported Petzner's comments as "Jörg and I were connected by something truly special. He was the man of my life ... I loved him as a best friend." The article was titled: Was Austrian far-right leader Joerg Haider gay? Euronews ran the headline "Rumours of Joerg Haider’s secret gay life." Other reports had that “some say” Haider had died “after a furious row with the man who now claims to have been his lover.”

Petzner's statements were criticized within the party as misleading and fit to be interpreted as insinuating a homosexual relationship between Haider and Petzner. His party's officials made a rushed attempt to limit the damage for the image of their far-right group and banned several other interviews that were to have occurred that week.

== BZÖ ==
From 12 October to 19 November 2008 he served as acting party chairman and was succeeded by Herbert Scheibner. Petzner concentrated on directing the party's election campaign in the federal state Carinthia. In the Carinthian state election on 1 March 2009, the BZÖ got 44,9 % of the votes.

As the party's designated leader, Petzner was also expected to be elected Klubobmann, i.e. chairman of the party's parliamentary group, but on 22 October 2008, Josef Bucher was elected instead, with Petzner becoming one of the five vice chairmen. Petzner himself was reported to have suggested Bucher, who was elected unanimously. Bucher's election was widely interpreted as the result of the rising criticism of Petzner's earlier statements.

When on 30 January 2010, after the secession of the majority of party officials and members from the Carinthian party, Bucher was elected Chairman of the newly formed Carinthian BZÖ, Petzner was unanimously elected Acting Chairman (the position Jörg Haider had held from 2005 till his death) and Vice-Chairman.

On 8 April 2010 Petzner announced his resignation as Secretary General of the nationwide BZÖ. His simultaneous position as Acting Chairman of the Carinthian BZÖ, where, after the break-away of the Freedom Party in Carinthia, a great deal of work needed to be done and would require his full concentration. Only a week earlier he had dismissed any such rumours of resignation as "attempts from a third party to disturb the Easter peace."

In March 2011 Petzner stepped down from the position as Acting Chairman (succeeded by Sigisbert Dolinschek (de)).

He was Josef Bucher's Vice-Chairmen in the newly formed Carinthian BZÖ state party until expulsion.

On 1 October 2013, Petzner was expelled from the BZÖ for "party damaging behaviour" after demanding Josef Bucher step down and criticizing the campaign after losing major voting shares in the 2013 Austrian legislative election to the Freedom Party.

Party political offices
Preceded by Jörg Haider	BZÖ Party Chairman (acting); 2008	Succeeded by Herbert Scheibner (acting)
