= Gaby Schaunig =

Austrian politician (born 1965)

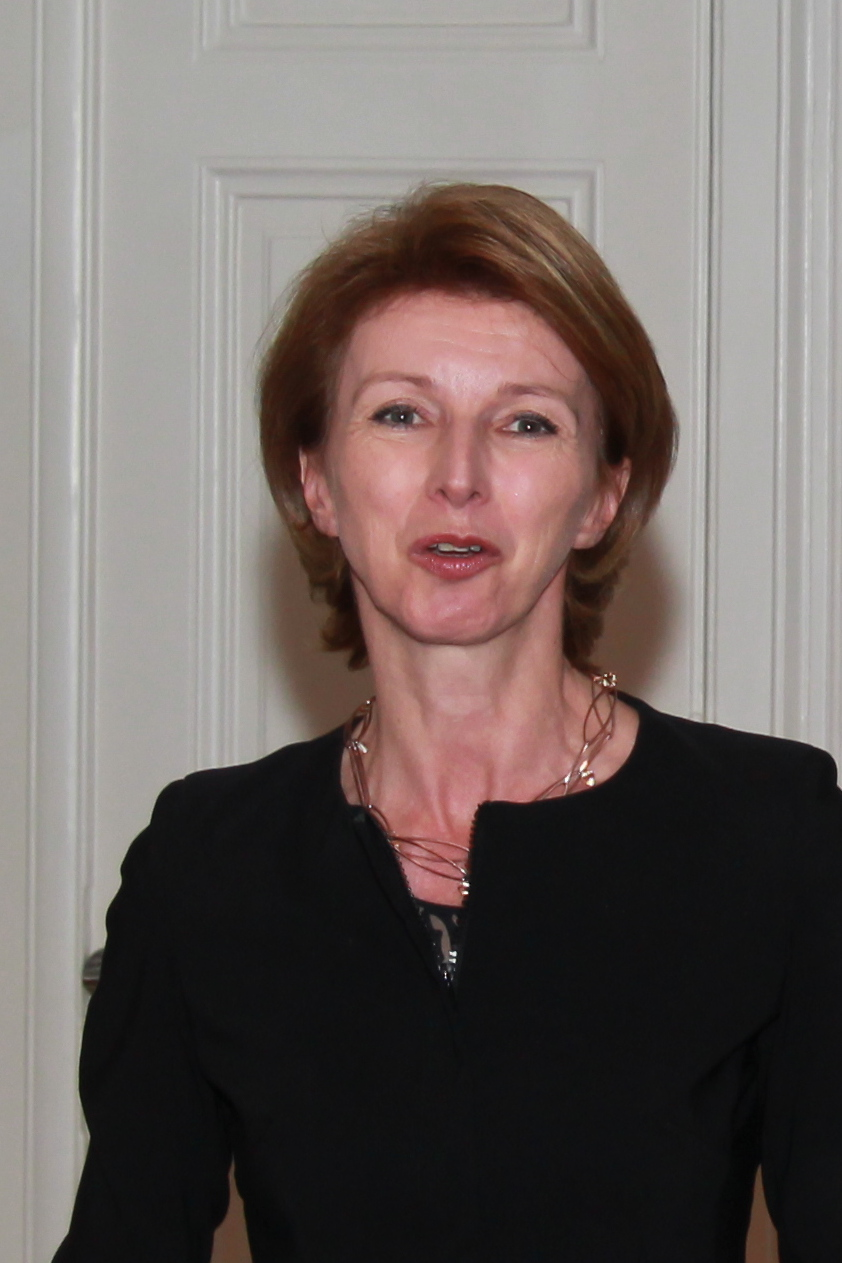
Image of Schaunig

Gabriele "Gaby" Schaunig-Kandut (born 3 May 1965, in Klagenfurt am Wörthersee) is an Austrian lawyer, politician from the (SPÖ) and since 2013 state councilor in the Carinthian state government Kaiser II, responsible for finance, investments, development and research since 2018. Since 13 April 2023, she has been 1st Deputy Governor, previously she was 2nd Deputy Governor.

== Life ==
Gaby Schaunig began studying law at Universität Graz in 1983, and completed with sponsion (master's degree) in 1987 and a doctorate in 1989. In addition to her work as a contract assistant and lecturer at the University of Graz (until 1993), she worked for the Chamber for Workers and Employees for Carinthia from 1990. From 2008 to 2011 she worked as a trainee lawyer. After passing the bar exam in 2011, she became a self-employed lawyer.

== Politics ==
From 1999, Gaby Schaunig was the provincial councillor for social affairs in the Carinthian provincial government. In the fall of 2005, she was elected party leader of the SPÖ Carinthia, replacing Peter Ambrozy, who had been unsuccessful in three provincial elections against Jörg Haider. She also took over his post as deputy governor on 23 November 2005. Following the termination of the working agreement with the BZÖ (formerly FPÖ) on 28 February 2006, she sought new elections and the office of provincial governor.

On 8 July 2008, Schaunig surprisingly announced her retirement from politics and thus her resignation as provincial party leader of the SPÖ Carinthia and deputy governor. Schaunig's successor in both functions was the then provincial councillor Reinhart Rohr. In a press conference, Schaunig cited Jörg Haider as the main reason for her resignation. He had introduced a "political lack of culture", as a result of which she was no longer prepared "to work in Jörg Haider's environment and his entourage".

As state councillor for social affairs, Gaby Schaunig was particularly committed to the circumstances and living conditions of people with cognitive disabilities. She drew up and published a needs and development plan to remove people with disabilities from large care facilities and implement the normalization principle. Through its commitment, the Caritas. Team Lebensgestaltung was also able to implement social space-oriented facilities for severely disabled adults.

In 2013, she returned to politics and has held the office of second deputy governor under Peter Kaiser since March 2013. From 2013 to 2018, she was responsible for the following departments: Finance, Housing, Municipalities, Employee Promotion. She is the technology officer of the state of Carinthia. From March 2015, she negotiated with the creditors of the wind-down bank HETA on behalf of the state of Carinthia. The negotiations were successfully concluded in 2016.

In the 32nd Legislative Period, Schaunig was responsible for the areas of finance, investments, development and research in the State Government Kaiser II as 2nd Deputy Governor and State Councillor from 12 April 2018.

== Private life ==
Gaby Schaunig is married and lives in the Wölfnitz district of Klagenfurt. She has one daughter.
