= Harald Jannach =

Austrian politician (born 1972)

Member of the National Council
- Incumbent
- Assumed office 28 October 2008
- Constituency: B Bundeswahlvorschlag

Personal details
- Born: 27 May 1972 (age 53)
- Party: Freedom Party of Austria

Harald Jannach (born 27 May 1972) is an Austrian politician who has been a Member of the National Council for the Freedom Party of Austria (FPÖ) since 2008.
