= Peter Westenthaler =

Austrian politician (born 1967)

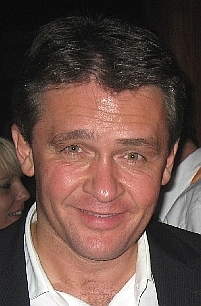

Member of the Board of Trustees of the Austrian Broadcasting Corporation
- Incumbent
- Assumed office March 2024
- Nominated by: Austrian Freedom Party

Chair of the Alliance for the Future
- In office 23 June 2006 – 30 August 2008
- Preceded by: Jörg Haider
- Succeeded by: Jörg Haider

Member of the National Council
- In office 30 October 2006 – 28 October 2013
- Nominated by: Himself
- Affiliation: Alliance for the Future
- In office 29 October 1999 – 19 December 2002
- Constituency: 9D – Vienna South

Personal details
- Born: 6 November 1967 (age 58)
- Party: Independent

Peter Westenthaler (born "Peter Hojač", 6 November 1967, Vienna) is an Austrian politician. He assumed his mother's maiden name Westenthaler instead of his former surname Hojač (Czech). A member of Jörg Haider's Freedom Party of Austria (FPÖ) up to the so-called "Knittelfeld Putsch" of 2002, he then worked for Frank Stronach's Magna Steyr, and in June 2006 was elected chairman of the newly founded Alliance for the Future of Austria (BZÖ).

As leader of the BZÖ, Westenthaler was engaged in a heated dispute with FPÖ chairman Heinz-Christian Strache over which of the two political parties is the legal successor to the former FPÖ (the party before the split of 2005 which was a candidate at the 2002 Austrian legislative election).

On 30 August 2008, Peter Westenthaler was officially replaced as chairman of the Alliance for the Future of Austria (BZÖ) by party founder Jörg Haider.

In 2017, Westenthaler was convicted of fraud and embezzlement and sentenced to two and a half years imprisonment. He was released from prison in January 2019.

In March of 2024, Westenthaler became a member of the Board of Trustees of the Austrian Broadcasting Corporation, having been nominated by the Austrian Freedom Party. The council representing journalists at the Austrian Broadcasting Corporation criticized Westenthaler's appointment, citing concerns that he could have a conflict of interest, as he continues to be employed by other news media organizations. Westenthaler is employed by OE24.TV as a regular contributor to their debate programmes. As of 2024, Westenthaler was not a member of any political party.

== Personal life ==
Westenthaler is married and has a daughter.
