= Jörg Haider =

Austrian politician (1950–2008)

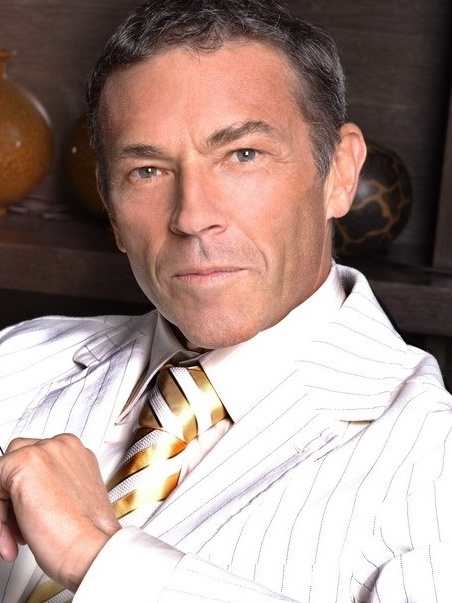
- Haider in 2007

Chair of the Alliance for the Future
- In office 30 August 2008 – 11 October 2008
- Preceded by: Peter Westenthaler
- Succeeded by: Stefan Petzner
- In office 17 April 2005 – 23 June 2006
- Preceded by: Party established
- Succeeded by: Peter Westenthaler

Governor of Carinthia
- In office 8 April 1999 – 11 October 2008
- Preceded by: Christoph Zernatto
- Succeeded by: Gerhard Dörfler
- In office 21 April 1989 – 21 June 1991
- Preceded by: Peter Ambrozy
- Succeeded by: Christoph Zernatto

Chair of the Freedom Party
- In office 13 September 1986 – 1 May 2000
- Preceded by: Norbert Steger
- Succeeded by: Susanne Riess-Passer

Personal details
- Born: 26 January 1950 Bad Goisern, Upper Austria, Austria
- Died: 11 October 2008 (aged 58) Köttmannsdorf, Carinthia, Austria
- Cause of death: Car accident
- Party: Alliance for the Future (2005–2008)
- Other political affiliations: Freedom Party (1970–2005)
- Spouse: Claudia Haider-Hofmann (m. 1976)
- Children: 2
- Education: University of Vienna (Dr iur)
- Profession: Lawyer; politician

Jörg Haider (German: [ˈjœʁk ˈhaɪdɐ]; 26 January 1950 – 11 October 2008) was an Austrian politician. He was Governor of Carinthia on two occasions, the long-time leader of the Freedom Party of Austria (FPÖ) and later Chairman of the Alliance for the Future of Austria (Bündnis Zukunft Österreich, BZÖ), a breakaway party from the FPÖ.

Haider was a controversial figure within Austria and abroad. Several countries imposed mild diplomatic sanctions against his party's participation in government alongside Wolfgang Schüssel's Austrian People's Party (ÖVP), starting from 2000. Haider died in a car accident shortly after leading the BZÖ in the 2008 Austrian parliamentary elections.

== Personal life ==
=== Parents ===
Haider's parents had been early members of the Austrian Nazi Party (DNSAP, the Austrian affiliate of the NSDAP, the German Nazi Party). Haider's father, Robert Haider, was a shoemaker. His mother, Dorothea Rupp, was the daughter of a well-to-do physician and head of the gynaecology ward at the general hospital of Linz.

Robert Haider joined the DNSAP in 1929 as a fifteen-year-old boy, four years before Adolf Hitler came to power in Germany. He remained a member even after the Nazi Party was banned in Austria and after Engelbert Dollfuss had dissolved the Austrian parliament and established the Ständestaat as a dictatorship.

In 1933, Robert Haider moved to Bavaria but returned to Austria the following year after the failed Nazi attempt to overthrow the Austrian government with the July Putsch. He was arrested and chose to move back to Germany where he joined the Austrian Legion, a division of the Sturmabteilung. Haider senior completed a two-year military service in Germany and returned to Austria in 1938 after it was annexed by Nazi Germany (the Anschluss). From 1940 on, he fought as a junior officer on the Western and Eastern Fronts in Europe during the Second World War. Having been wounded several times, he was discharged from the Wehrmacht with the rank of lieutenant. In 1945, he married Dorothea Rupp, at that time a leader in the Bund Deutscher Mädel (BDM).

Following the end of the war, Haider's parents were investigated as part of the denazification process, conducted to determine what measures should be taken against them because of their NSDAP membership (proceedings against all former Nazis—NSDAP members and collaborators—were undertaken as a matter of law in both Austria and Germany after the war ended).

They were labelled as "Minderbelastet" (meaning "compromised to a lesser degree", i.e. low-ranking in the NSDAP structure). Robert Haider found a job in a shoe factory. Dorothea Haider, who had been a teacher, was prohibited from teaching for a few years following the end of the war. Robert was forced to dig graves. Haider's mother eventually outlived him, turning ninety on the day he died.

=== Early life ===
Haider was born in the Upper Austrian town of Bad Goisern in 1950, a time when his parents' finances were rather moderate, and his elder sister, Ursula, was four years old. He performed well at primary school and attended high school in Bad Ischl despite his parents' financial situation. Haider was reportedly always at the top of his class at high school. During his time in Bad Ischl, he had first contacts with nationalist organisations, such as the Burschenschaft Albia, a right-wing student group.

After he graduated with highest distinction in 1968, he was drafted into the Austrian Army, where he voluntarily spent more than the compulsory nine months (called "the voluntary one year"). After his discharge in 1969, he moved to Vienna and began studying Law and Political Science at the University of Vienna. He graduated in 1973 with the title of Dr iur. During his studies, he was affiliated again with a Burschenschaft: Silvania. In 1974, he started to work at the University of Vienna law faculty in the department of constitutional law.

=== Marriage and children ===
Haider was married to Claudia Hoffmann from 1 May 1976 until his death. They had two daughters.

=== Bärental estate ===
Location of the state of Carinthia in the south of Austria

Throughout his career Haider had concentrated his politics on Carinthia. His personal life was heavily connected with this part of Austria: Haider became wealthy in 1983 when he inherited the estate of Wilhelm Webhofer, who had owned a large parcel of land in Carinthia commonly known as "Bärental" (bear valley). This estate has a history that came up in the 1990s in the Austrian media.

The land had been owned by an Italian Jew until 1941. At that point in time the Nazis still hesitated to take possession of property owned by non-German Jews without any compensation. Inside Italy, Jewish property was not yet open for confiscation and the Mussolini government was not inclined to allow this to happen to Jewish nationals abroad either. Thus when the estate was sold in 1941, one Josef Webhofer (a former resident of South Tyrol, Italy, and an Optant) paid 300,000 Reichsmark (equivalent to 1 million euros in 2021) to obtain title to the land. After the war, Mathilde Roifer, the widow of the former Jewish owner of Bärental, demanded compensation.

Despite a panel finding that the property was fairly sold, Webhofer paid Roifer an additional sum of approximately 661,000 schillings (equivalent to 5 million euros in 2018). In 1955 Josef Webhofer's son, Wilhelm, not a blood relative of Haider but rather a "Wahlonkel" or uncle-by-choice, inherited the estate and later bequeathed it to Haider.

== Political career ==
=== Rise to power in the FPÖ ===
The Austrian Freedom Party (FPÖ) was founded in 1955, and initially was a mixture of various political currents opposed both to the political catholicism of the Austrian People's Party and the socialist views of the Social Democratic Party of Austria (SPÖ).

With its roots in the Pan-German movement, it included both German-nationalist and liberal political views. In 1970 Haider became the leader of the FPÖ youth movement and headed it until 1975. Haider rose rapidly through the party ranks. In 1972, at the age of 22, he was already a well-established leader and was made party affairs manager of the Carinthian FPÖ in 1976. In 1979 he was the youngest delegate among the 183 members of parliament, at age 29.

Beginning in 1983 his policies became more aggressive, when he rose to party head of the Carinthian FPÖ and started to criticise the leaders of the FPÖ, which at that time was still a minor political movement in Austria, usually winning only about 5–6% of the vote.

The decisive point of his career came in 1986 when he defeated Austrian Vice Chancellor Norbert Steger in the vote for party leadership at the party convention in September in Innsbruck; many delegates feared that Steger's liberal political views and his coalition with the Social Democrats threatened the party's existence. Haider represented the pan-German nationalist wing of the party, opposed to the classical liberal one led by Steger.

=== Political struggle in Carinthia ===
Until 1989, the SPÖ held an absolute majority in the Austrian province of Carinthia; when it received less than 50% of seats in 1989, ÖVP and FPÖ formed a coalition and elected Haider as Landeshauptmann (governor) of Carinthia.

In 1991, in a debate in the regional parliament, a Socialist leader attacked Haider's plan of reducing unemployment payments for people seen as "freeloaders", calling it forced work placement reminiscent of Nazi policies. Haider replied, "No, they didn't have that in the Third Reich, because in the Third Reich they had a proper employment policy, which not even your government in Vienna can manage to bring about." Haider claimed that the legislators understood his comment as a criticism of the present Austrian government, but in the days that followed the SPÖ joined with the ÖVP in a vote of no confidence against him.

Haider had to resign his post as governor and the FPÖ–ÖVP coalition was replaced by an SPÖ–ÖVP coalition. Although the remark was costly both for Haider and the FPÖ, a country-wide poll reported that 42% of Austrians considered the press's treatment exaggerated, and 33% believed Haider's remarks to be based in fact.

In 1999, Haider again was elected governor of Carinthia by the Carinthian parliament, where the FPÖ now held a plurality of more than 42%. Even after the FPÖ fell to only 10% from 27% in the national elections in 2002, Haider's support in Carinthia did not diminish and he succeeded in the 2004 elections receiving a slightly higher percentage (42.5%) than in 1999.

=== FPÖ chairman ===
==== Haider as opposition leader ====
Under Haider's leadership, the FPÖ moved to the right, reflecting Haider's nationalist, anti-immigration, and anti-EU views. Haider relied primarily on populism (see below) to advance his interests. From 1986 when Haider became the FPÖ's chairman the party's share in elections rose from 5% in the 1983 elections to almost 27% in 1999.

In a 1988 interview he claimed that the idea of Austrian nationhood (separate from the German nation) was an "ideological monstrosity" (ideologische Mißgeburt). Seven years later, he distanced himself from this statement and instead defined the FPÖ as a "classic Austrian patriotic party", as fewer and fewer Austrians identified with the German nation. However, Haider's German nationalist roots were still evident in his rejection of minority rights for non-German-speaking ethnic groups, hostility towards European integration and immigration.

With Haider practically leading the FPÖ single-handedly, he was able to unite the scattered, divided extreme-right in Austria and establish a party that was not so much founded on leading personalities or an ideology but on just one leader – Haider himself, who used to change his opinions frequently. His style of governing the party became authoritarian in the following years, however his followers did not challenge his ultimate authority in the party, especially because Haider was able to gain one victory after another in elections.

An exception was the split off by the Liberal Forum in 1993 headed by Heide Schmidt, who had served as Haider's deputy chairman and run as the FPÖ's candidate for presidency in 1992. The liberals initially gained the support of about 6% of the voters nationwide, but Schmidt was not able to uphold this support and the Liberal Forum subsequently dropped out of parliament in 1999.

FPÖ's mixture of populism, anti-establishment and nationalist themes steadily gained support over the years. In addition to far-right voters, the FPÖ was able to attract voters from both the Social Democrats and the Conservatives in both the national and regional elections of the 1990s, mostly those who were fed up with decades of government by the 'Great Coalition' (see also: Proporz).

==== Coalition government with Wolfgang Schüssel's People's party ====
In 2000, Haider's Freedom Party unexpectedly came in second after the Social Democrats (SPÖ) in the 1999 parliamentary elections. After efforts to renew the grand coalition failed, the ÖVP reached an agreement with the FPÖ. In the normal course of events, Haider would have become chancellor. However, it soon became apparent that he was too controversial to be part of the government, let alone lead it. Haider thus stepped aside in favour of ÖVP leader Wolfgang Schüssel.

The coalition caused widespread outrage both in Austria and the rest of Europe. The heads of government of the other fourteen EU members decided to cease cooperation with the Austrian government, as it was felt in many countries that the cordon sanitaire against coalitions with parties considered as right-wing extremists, which had mostly held in Western Europe since 1945, had been breached. For several months, other national leaders shunned diplomatic contacts with members of the Schüssel government. Supporters of the government often blamed social democrats and President Thomas Klestil for these sanctions, and questioned their loyalty to the country.

At the end of February 2000, Haider stepped down from the leadership of the Freedom Party. Susanne Riess-Passer succeeded him, and thus became Vice-Chancellor when the coalition agreement was formally signed on 4 February. This was widely regarded as a cynical move to appease foreign criticism, as he appeared to continue to control the party from behind the scenes. Riess-Passer was widely viewed as being only pro forma in charge. Haider proclaimed that his move was just the fulfillment of his promise to Carinthian FPÖ voters that he had given prior to the election that had been held that same year.

Following analyses of the diplomatic sanctions, EU leaders came to believe that the measures were counterproductive and returned to normality in September 2000, even though the coalition remained unchanged.

=== Collapse of the first coalition and decline of the Freedom Party ===
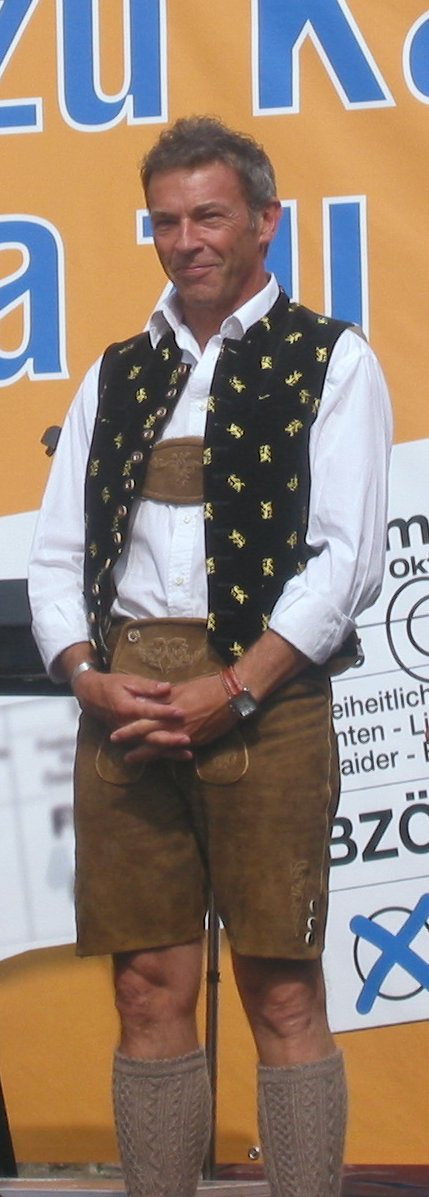
Jörg Haider wearing lederhosen at a meeting of his party BZÖ (2006)

In September 2002, after a special party convention in Knittelfeld (Styria), the so-called Knittelfeld Putsch, Riess-Passer lost the support of many party members. This meeting is also sometimes considered as a rebellion against the members which are currently involved in the government, which was thought to be started or at least supported by Haider. Thus Riess-Passer resigned as Vice Chancellor and Party Chairwoman. With her, Karl-Heinz Grasser, the finance minister, and Peter Westenthaler, the head of the Freedom Party's Parliament Club, also resigned.

This triggered general elections in November, which resulted in a victory with 42.3% of the vote for the conservative Austrian People's Party (ÖVP) led by Federal Chancellor Wolfgang Schüssel. Haider's Freedom Party, which in 1999 was slightly stronger than Schüssel's party, was reduced to 10.16% of the vote.

In response, Haider stated that he had demanded that the leader of the FPÖ must step down to allow him to be leader, and on being refused, stated that he would leave federal politics permanently.

In October 2003, in a cabinet reshuffle instigated by Haider, Herbert Haupt stepped down as Vice Chancellor and was replaced by Hubert Gorbach.

On 7 March 2004, the FPÖ won a plurality (42.5%) of the vote in the elections for the Carinthian parliament. On 31 March 2004, Haider was re-elected Governor of Carinthia by the FPÖ and SPÖ members of the state parliament.

However, outside Carinthia, Haider's charisma seemed to have largely lost its appeal among voters. The FPÖ incurred devastating losses in several regional elections, the 2004 European elections and in elections for the Austrian Chamber of Commerce. In each of those elections, it lost between one half to two thirds of their previous voters.

=== Creation of a new party ===
As a consequence, the FPÖ, whose chair was Haider's sister, Ursula Haubner, was riven with internal strife. On 4 April 2005, Haider, Haubner, Vice Chancellor Hubert Gorbach and other leading figures of the FPÖ announced the creation of a new party called Alliance for the Future of Austria (Bündnis Zukunft Österreich, BZÖ) with Haider as leader. In effect, this split the FPÖ into two parties.

In the following months, the BZÖ tried to establish itself within the Austrian political landscape, but met little success. Haider and his new party remained in the coalition with the People's party, leading to fierce fights between the FPÖ and BZÖ following the split-up. Subsequent polls showed that both parties were losing voter approval and in danger of failing to reach the critical 4% of the national vote barrier required for representation in parliament.

In the 2006 general elections, the BZÖ received 4.1% of votes, thus narrowly securing its representation of 7 seats in parliament. The FPÖ, now led by Heinz-Christian Strache surpassed initial expectations, receiving 11.0% of the vote, 532 votes behind the Greens.

From June 2006 to August 2008, the BZÖ was led by Peter Westenthaler. On 30 August 2008, shortly before the legislative election, Haider re-assumed the party chairmanship. Subsequently, the BZÖ received 10.7% of votes, and the FPÖ 17.5% of votes.

=== Stefan Petzner ===
Stefan Petzner, Haider's designated successor as party chairman, stated in an ORF radio interview on 19 October 2008, that at the time of Haider's death he and the politician were in a relationship which "went far beyond friendship" with the full knowledge of the latter's wife. Petzner also said that "Jörg and I were connected by something truly special. He was the man of my life (German: Lebensmensch)." The term Lebensmensch can imply an intimate relationship but can also be interpreted as "icon" or "mentor". Associated Press reported Petzner's comments as "Jörg and I were connected by something truly special. He was the man of my life ... I loved him as a best friend." Haider had neither confirmed nor denied the widespread rumours about his sexuality, but he was often criticised for surrounding himself with young men in his political movement, which was nicknamed 'Haider's boys' party'.

== Political views ==
Since beginning his political career in the 1970s, Haider was critical of mainstream Austrian politics. He used simple slogans to raise his popularity by exploiting issues where he saw the general public perceived injustice or the self-interest of big party politics (specifically the SPÖ and the Austrian People's Party).

In a 27 September 2008 talk show on ORF television, Haider described the boards of directors of numerous world banks as "mafia". Haider also advocated the creation of heavier punishments for banking managers and proposed the creation of a special Legal Court against financial crimes, in one of his last interviews to the Austrian daily Kleine Zeitung.

Haider supported fighting against inflation, and paying a minimum salary of €1000 per month, as well as €1000 per month for mothers. He also supported reforming the Austrian social insurance system with one insurance company per profession. Until 2005 Haider was for the entry of Turkey into the European Union. Later, he urged that decisions like the treaty for the European Union, or the entrance of Turkey into the European Union should be decided by a referendum.

=== Immigration ===
Throughout his career, Haider vigorously opposed immigration and Islam. In the early 1990s, Haider proclaimed:

The social order of Islam is opposed to our Western values. Human rights and democracy are as incompatible with the Muslim religious doctrine as is the equality of women. In Islam, the individual and his free will count for nothing; faith and religious struggle – jihad, the holy war – for everything.

=== Language policy ===
One of Haider's main political struggles was the one against bilingualism in southern Carinthia, where an indigenous Slovene ethnic-linguistic community, known as the Carinthian Slovenes, lives. Already in the 1980s, Haider pursued a policy of segregation in schools, insisting on physically dividing the Slovene and German-speaking pupils in elementary schools in southern Carinthia. In December 2001, the Austrian Constitutional Court ruled that topographic road signs in all settlements in Carinthia which have had more than 10% of Slovene-speaking inhabitants over a longer period of time, should be written both in German and Slovene. Haider refused to carry out this decision, which has been reiterated by the Court several times thereafter, and publicly threatened to sue the president of the Constitutional Court. Instead of erecting hundreds of new bilingual signs, as ruled by the court, Haider ordered the removal of several existing ones, which triggered a wave of protest among the local Slovene minority, including acts of civil disobedience.

In May 2006, Haider personally moved the road sign of the town of Bleiburg (Slovene: Pliberk) in south-eastern Carinthia for several meters (yards) as the response to the decision of the Constitutional Court which ruled the sign was unconstitutional because it was written only in German. He compared himself to Jesus Christ who moved the stone over his tomb, provoking indignation by the local Roman Catholic clergy. After the Court condemned his action as illegal, Haider threatened to call a regional referendum on the issue, for which he was publicly admonished by the Federal President Heinz Fischer. The referendum was blocked by the decision of the Federal institutions which found it unconstitutional. In December 2006, Haider tried to bypass the ruling of the Constitutional Court by attaching less prominent plaques with Slovene placenames to German road signs, which was again found unconstitutional by the Constitutional Court. Haider nevertheless disregarded the Court's decision and pursued his action.

In his last speech, delivered on the celebration of the 88th anniversary of the Carinthian Plebiscite only a few hours before his death, Haider reiterated his opposition to any kind of visual bilingualism in the region and warned the Slovene politicians "not to play with fire".

== Support from Muammar al-Gaddafi and Saddam Hussein ==
Haider was also known to have visited Iraq to meet Saddam Hussein on the eve of the 2003 Iraq War, as well as having had a friendship with Muammar Gaddafi when Libya was an international pariah.

The investigation proved that the two gentlemen had received the amount of five million US Dollars from Saddam Hussein against their services to him. Edwald [sic] Stadler received three million seven hundred and fifty thousand US Dollars, and Dr Jörg Haider received the rest, which is one million two hundred and fifty thousand US Dollars.

A confiscated diary mentions a $58.7 million transfer from Gaddafi, as well as more than $13.3 million that individuals brought home from Iraq. Some of Saddam's money was picked up by Haider's confidant from a Swiss account belonging to the dead sons of Saddam Hussein.

== Criticism by Arnold Schwarzenegger ==
In 2000, Austrian-American actor and politician Arnold Schwarzenegger criticised anti-immigrant remarks made by Haider: "As an immigrant myself, I am offended by anyone who makes anti-immigrant statements, and it is my opinion that someone who makes statements like Haider's has no place in government. I have never supported him in the past and do not now. I am hopeful that Austria will find a way through this. As an Austrian-born, I am so saddened that, with all the progress we have made working for an open and tolerant society, one man's statements can taint world opinion of an entire country. I know that there are many tolerant people in Austria. It is my hope that their voices can and will be heard."

== Allegations of Nazi sympathies and antisemitism ==
Haider was frequently criticized for statements in praise of Nazi policies, or considered antisemitic. International reports on Haider often referred to his remark that the Nazi government had produced a "proper employment policy" as compared to the SPÖ government. He was forced to resign as governor of the Carinthia province in 1991 because of the incident. Haider years later apologized. On one occasion during a parliamentary debate, Haider described World War II concentration camps as "punishment camps".

On several occasions Haider made remarks about Austrian World War II veterans that were represented as broad endorsement of the war and of the Nazi SS. Speaking to a gathering of veterans from several countries in 1990, he said that the veterans were "decent people of good character" and "remain true to their convictions". Haider stated that he did not specifically address Waffen-SS veterans with his remarks. On another occasion, he said, "the Waffen-SS was part of the Wehrmacht (German military) and because of that it deserves every honour and recognition". The Waffen-SS was in fact not part of the Wehrmacht. In 2000, at a gathering of Wehrmacht veterans in Ulrichsberg, including Waffen-SS veterans, he said, "Those who come to Ulrichsberg are not the old Nazis. They are not neo-Nazis, they are not criminals."

Haider also compared the deportation of Jews by the Nazis to the expulsion of Sudeten Germans from Czechoslovakia after World War II. His detractors pointed to a punning reference to the leader of the Jewish community of Vienna, Ariel Muzicant; Haider indicated that he did not understand how someone named Ariel (also the name of a popular laundry detergent) could have gathered so much filth, implying the real estate agent's business methods were crooked. Haider's critics characterized the remark as antisemitic. He maintained that Muzicant faked antisemitic hate letters to himself. He later withdrew this and other accusations, and apologized for his "derogatory remarks".

Haider was closely watched by Mossad, the Israeli secret service; FPÖ secretary general Peter Sichrovsky – a Jewish-Austrian politician and formerly one of Haider's closest aides – had gathered inside information on Haider's controversial contacts with prominent "Arab dictators". Due to Haider's perceived contacts to Holocaust deniers, the Israeli Foreign Ministry on 29 September 2008 declared it was heavily concerned about the 2008 Austrian elections; a spokesman of the ministry said that Israeli officials were "very worried about the rise to power of people who promote hatred, Holocaust denial, and befriend neo-Nazis. We see it as a disturbing development and are following the matter very closely."

== Death and aftermath ==
Haider died of injuries from a car crash at Lambichl in Köttmannsdorf near Klagenfurt, in the state of Carinthia, in the early hours of 11 October 2008. He had been on his way to celebrate his mother's 90th birthday. Police reported that the Volkswagen Phaeton that Haider had been driving came off the road, rolled down an embankment, and overturned, causing him "severe head and chest injuries". He had also allegedly been meeting with a young man, after having previously quarreled with Stefan Petzner that same evening. He was alone in the government car and no other vehicles were involved.

At the time of the crash, Haider's car was travelling at 142 km/h (88 mph) or faster, more than twice the legal speed limit of 70 km/h (43 mph) for that part of the Loiblpass road. An initial investigation uncovered no signs of foul play, and conspiracy theories about the death have been strongly rejected by the Austrian police. Haider's widow denied that her husband was gay and questioned the official account of the accident. Haider's blood alcohol level at the time of the crash was 1.8 mg/L, more than three times the legal limit of 0.5 mg/L. This fact was noted by both Haider's spokesman and the state prosecutor. The director general of the Carinthian administration declared that in case the Governor had been intoxicated, the state would have the right to recourse for the damaged car against Haider's descendants.

Austrian President Heinz Fischer said of Haider's death that it was a "human tragedy". Reactions in the press were mixed. Wolfgang Fellner, publisher of Österreich, wrote that he had: "fought bitterly" with Haider, but "finally, Haider became a gentle, considerate, almost wise politician ... Alas, he was once again too fast." Haider "died as he lived: always full throttle, always over the limit", Fellner concluded. However, Ernst Trost pointed out in the Kronen Zeitung that while Haider had enjoyed a "comet-like rise" in politics, he had also "ever again embarked on self-destructive actions and provoked opposition." The Chief Editor of Kurier, Christoph Kotanko, wrote that "however much his brown tones, xenophobia and aggressive populism were to be rejected ... Haider's criticism of the dominant conditions of the 1980s and 90s was partly also justified", and he had "named, fought and in part also changed" those conditions.

On 25 January 2009, the Lippitzbachbrücke, a motorway bridge in Carinthia, was renamed to "Jörg-Haider-Brücke". That year, the consequences of Haider's financial policies became apparent when the Bavarian-Carinthian Hypo Alpe-Adria-Bank International got into serious difficulties, later leading to the bank's nationalisation. Swiss paper Tagesanzeiger wrote about "Haider's money destruction machine". In 2009, Carinthia had the highest per-capita debt in Austria.

=== Posthumous controversies ===
Haider's widow, Claudia, sued the German newspaper Bild-Zeitung for publishing interviews with a man claiming to have been Jörg Haider's lover for many years. In October 2009, an Austrian court ruled it illegal for media to call Haider a homosexual, because it would be a "breach of personal and privacy rights". In its ruling, the court threatened a fine of up to €100,000 for anybody "who claims or distributes the claim that Jörg Haider was a homosexual and/or bisexual and/or that he has had a male lover". The Graz provincial court also issued the same preliminary injunctions against Bild-Zeitung, the Austrian paper Österreich and the Austrian magazine News.

According to a confiscated black booklet handwritten by Walter Meischberger, a former Freedom Party politician, Austrian authorities said they would examine a diary that allegedly detailed money transfers from Saddam Hussein and Muammar Gaddafi. The diary reportedly mentions a US$58.7 million transfer from Gaddafi, as well as more than US$13.3 million that unidentified individuals brought back from Iraq. It also references an anonymous confidant who supposedly brought a suitcase filled with $6.6 million from Switzerland to Munich for investment purposes; the money was supposed to have come from a Swiss account belonging to the deceased Uday Hussein and Qusay Hussein.

== See also ==
- Christoph Blocher, similar figure in Switzerland for the Swiss People's Party

Political offices
Preceded by Peter Ambrozy	Governor of Carinthia; 1989–1991	Succeeded by Christoph Zernatto
Preceded by Christoph Zernatto	Governor of Carinthia; 1999–2008	Succeeded by Gerhard Dörfler
Party political offices
Preceded by Norbert Steger	FPÖ Party Chairman; 1986–2000	Succeeded by Susanne Riess-Passer
Preceded by position created	BZÖ Party Chairman; 2005–2006	Succeeded by Peter Westenthaler
Preceded by Peter Westenthaler	BZÖ Party Chairman; 2008	Succeeded by Stefan Petzner (acting)
