= 2002 Austrian legislative election =

- 24 November 2002

All 183 seats in the National Council 92 seats needed for a majority
- Turnout: 84.27% (▲3.85 pp)
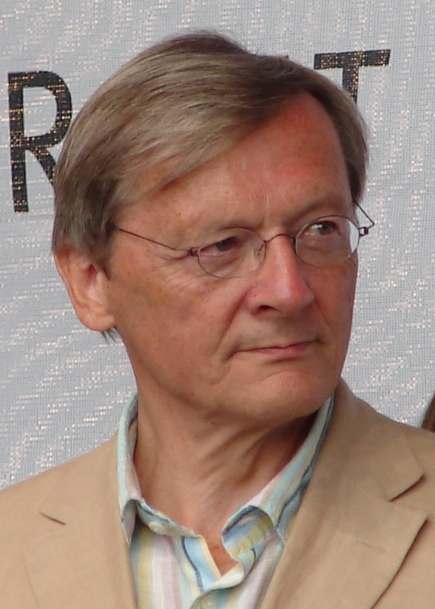

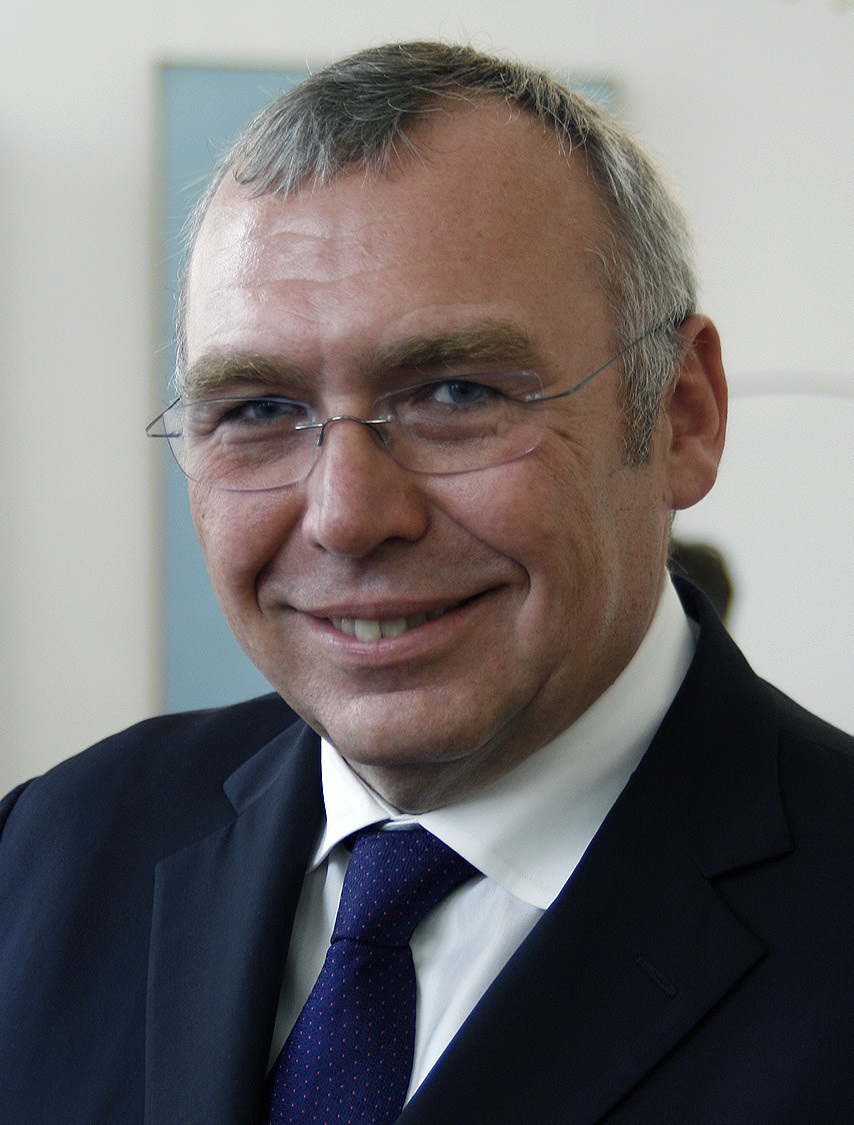

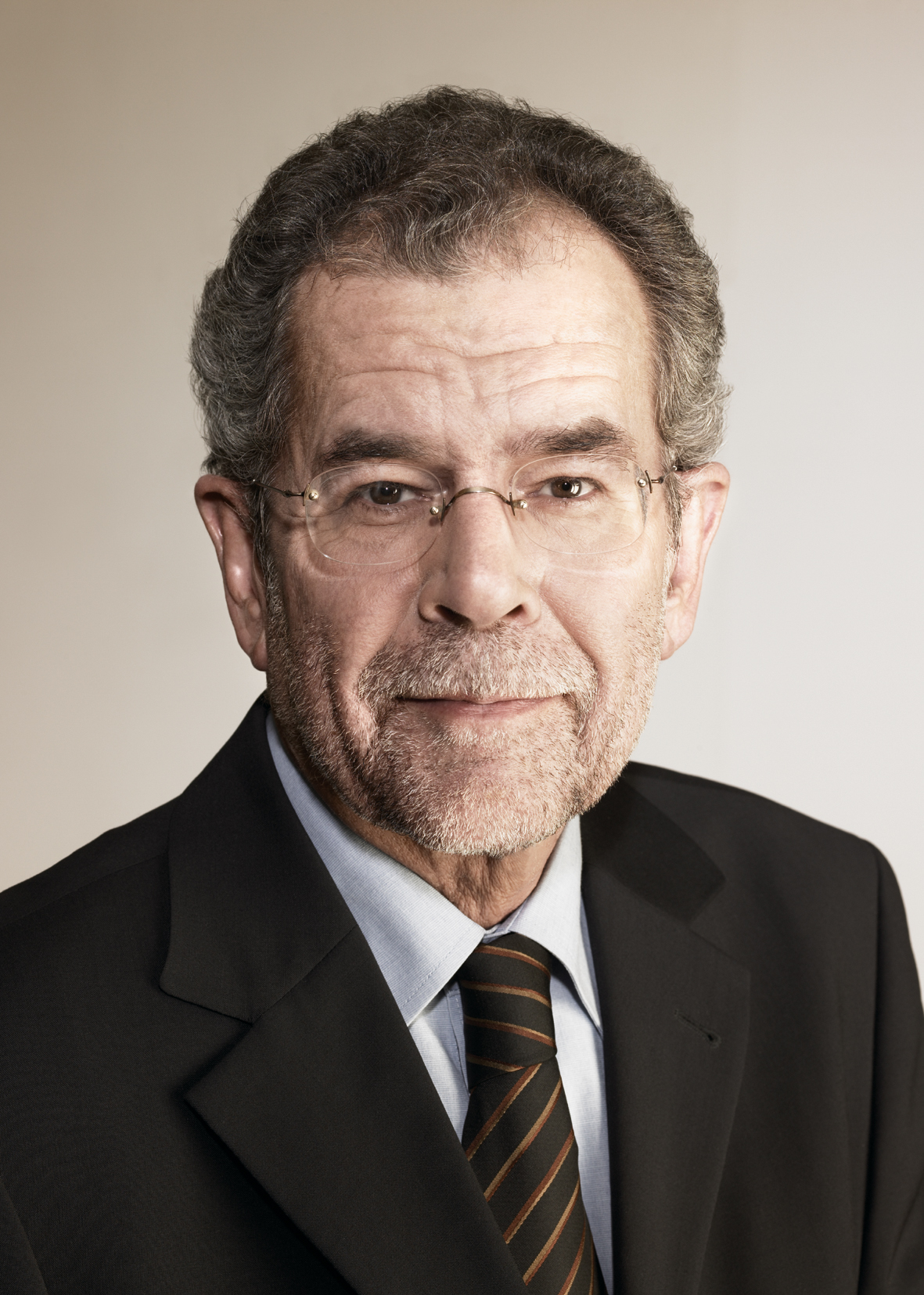
	First party	Second party
Leader	Wolfgang Schüssel	Alfred Gusenbauer
Party	ÖVP	SPÖ
Last election	26.91%, 52 seats	33.15%, 65 seats
Seats won	79	69
Seat change	▲27	▲4
Popular vote	2,076,833	1,792,499
Percentage	42.30%	36.51%
Swing	▲15.39 pp	▲3.36 pp
	Third party	Fourth party
Leader	Herbert Haupt	Alexander Van der Bellen
Party	FPÖ	Greens
Last election	26.91%, 52 seats	7.40%, 14 seats
Seats won	18	17
Seat change	▼34	▲3
Popular vote	491,328	464,980
Percentage	10.01%	9.47%
Swing	▼16.90 pp	▲2.07 pp
Chancellor before election
Wolfgang Schüssel
ÖVP
Elected Chancellor
Wolfgang Schüssel
ÖVP

Early parliamentary elections were held in Austria on 24 November 2002, after internal divisions in the Freedom Party of Austria (FPÖ) culminating in the Knittelfeld Putsch led to the resignation of several leading FPÖ members. The Austrian People's Party (ÖVP) emerged as the largest party, winning 79 of the 183 seats, the first time it had been the largest party in the National Council since 1966. It continued its coalition government with the FPÖ, which lost almost two-thirds of its seats. Voter turnout was 84%.

This was the only election between 1970 and 2013 which saw the ÖVP emerge as the largest party, and the only election in that time period which saw the Social Democratic Party fail to win the most seats.

== Contesting parties ==
The table below lists parties represented in the 21st National Council.

Name		Ideology	Leader	1999 result	
Name		Ideology	Leader	Votes (%)	Seats
SPÖ	Social Democratic Party of Austria; Sozialdemokratische Partei Österreichs	Social democracy	Alfred Gusenbauer	33.2%	65 / 183
FPÖ	Freedom Party of Austria; Freiheitliche Partei Österreichs	Right-wing populism Euroscepticism	Herbert Haupt	26.9%	52 / 183
ÖVP	Austrian People's Party; Österreichische Volkspartei	Christian democracy	Wolfgang Schüssel	26.9%	52 / 183
GRÜNE	The Greens; Die Grünen	Green politics	Alexander Van der Bellen	7.4%	14 / 183

== Results ==
Party	Votes	%	Seats	+/–
Austrian People's Party	2,076,833	42.30	79	+27
Social Democratic Party of Austria	1,792,499	36.51	69	+4
Freedom Party of Austria	491,328	10.01	18	–34
The Greens	464,980	9.47	17	+3
Liberal Forum	48,083	0.98	0	0
Communist Party of Austria	27,568	0.56	0	0
Socialist Left Party	3,906	0.08	0	New
The Democrats	2,439	0.05	0	New
Christian Voters Community	2,009	0.04	0	0
Total	4,909,645	100.00	183	0
Valid votes	4,909,645	98.54		
Invalid/blank votes	72,616	1.46		
Total votes	4,982,261	100.00		
Registered voters/turnout	5,912,592	84.27		
Source: Interior Ministry

=== Results by state ===
State	ÖVP	SPÖ	FPÖ	Grüne	Others
Burgenland	42.4	45.8	6.4	4.7	0.7
Carinthia	30.5	38.3	23.6	6.2	1.4
Lower Austria	47.8	36.8	6.9	7.2	1.3
Upper Austria	42.6	37.0	10.4	8.7	1.3
Salzburg	46.7	30.8	10.7	10.4	1.4
Styria	44.6	37.0	9.6	7.0	1.8
Tyrol	51.9	24.5	10.0	11.6	2.0
Vorarlberg	49.2	20.1	13.0	14.5	3.2
Vienna	30.7	43.8	8.0	15.1	2.4
Austria	42.3	36.5	10.0	9.5	1.7
Source: Austrian Interior Ministry
