= Campaigning in the 2008 Austrian legislative election =

2008 Austrian legislative election
← 2006	28 September 2008	Next →

183 seats in the National Council of Austria 92 seats were needed for a majority
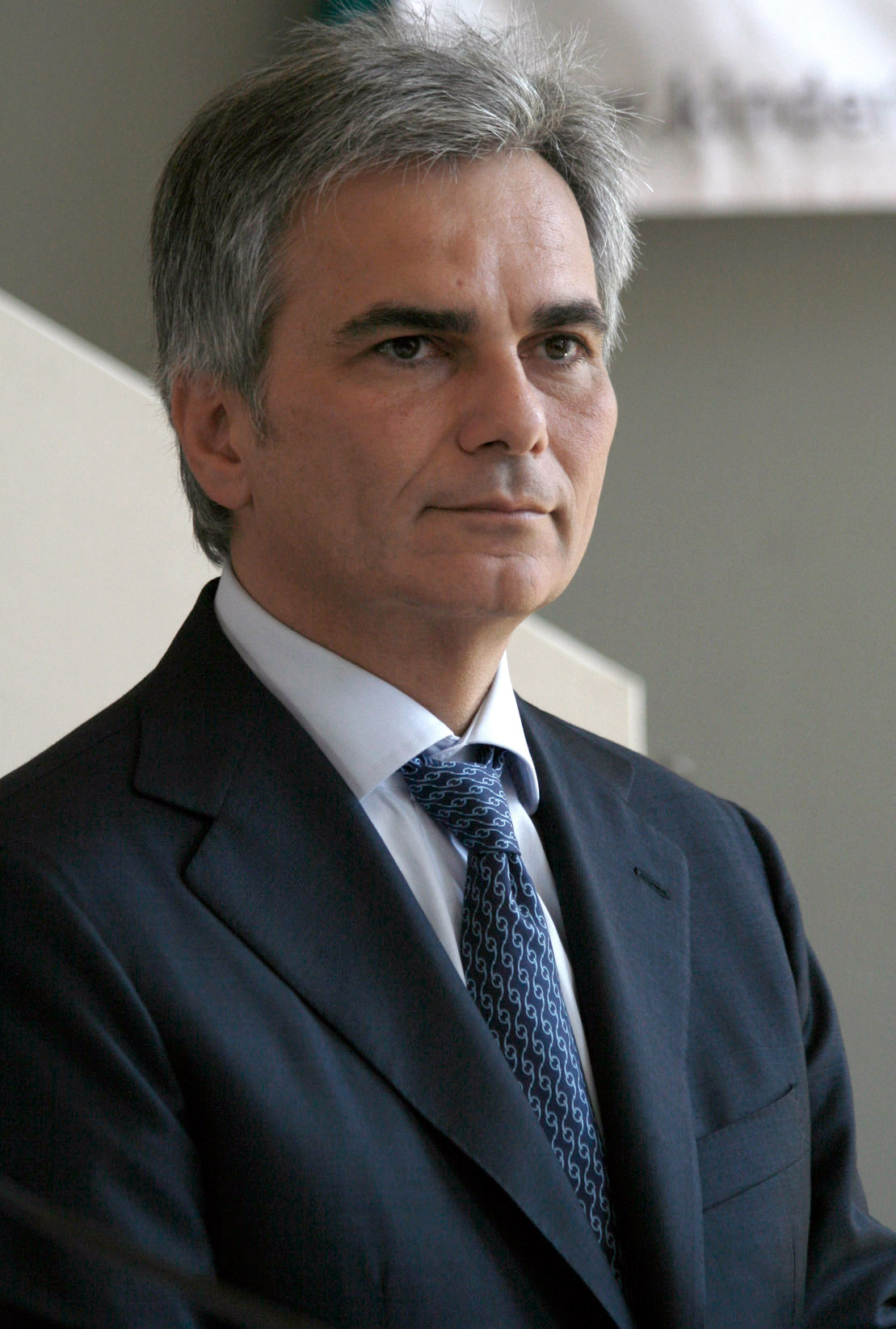

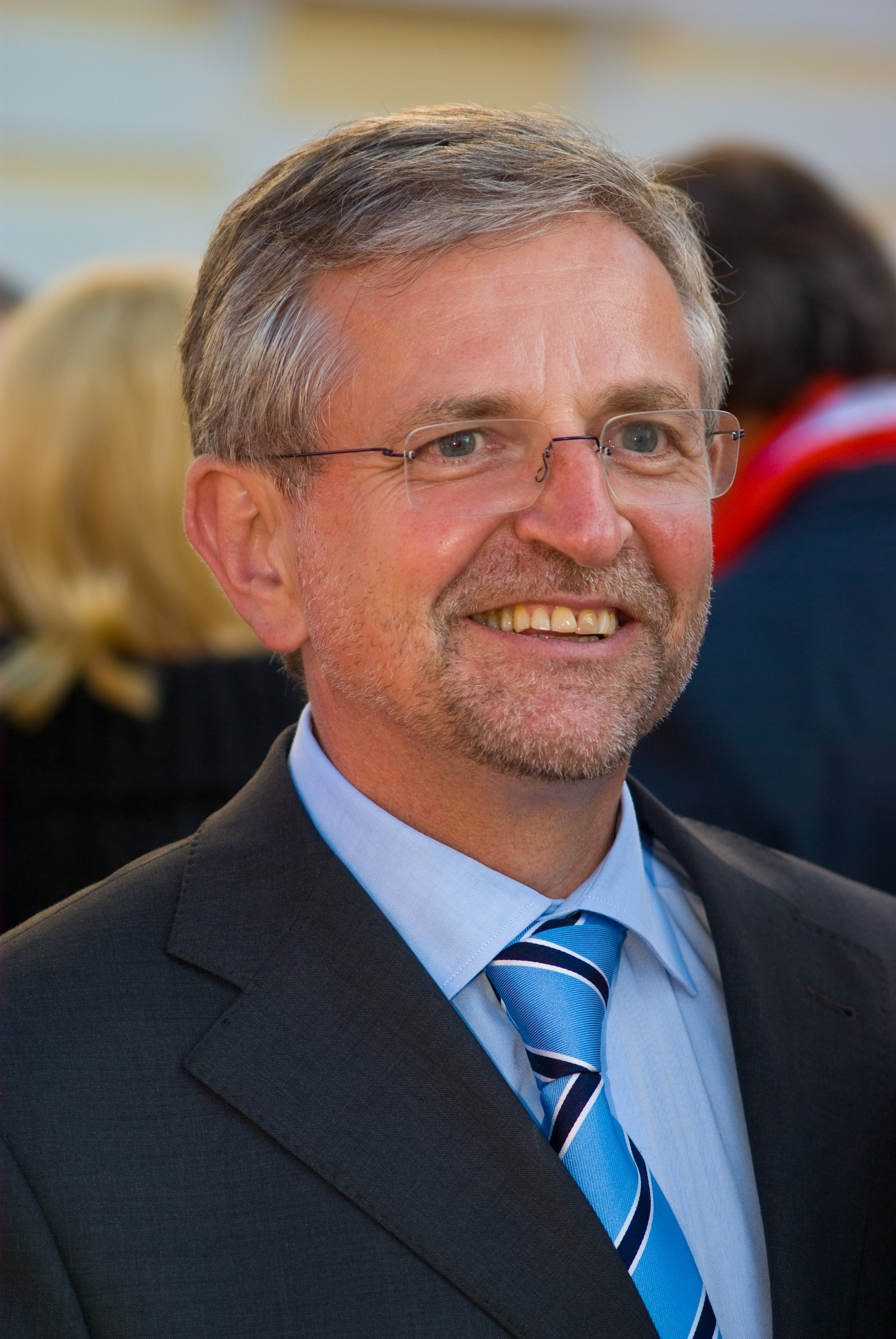

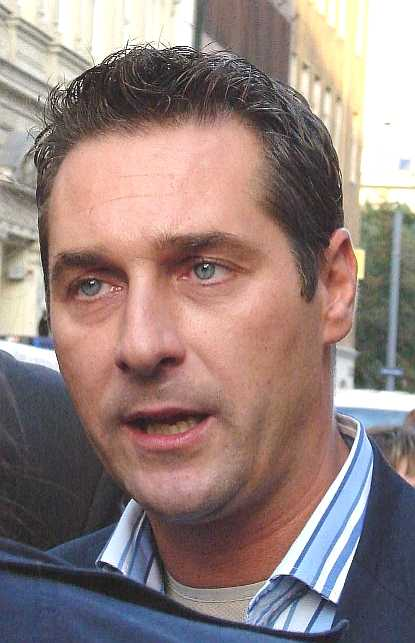

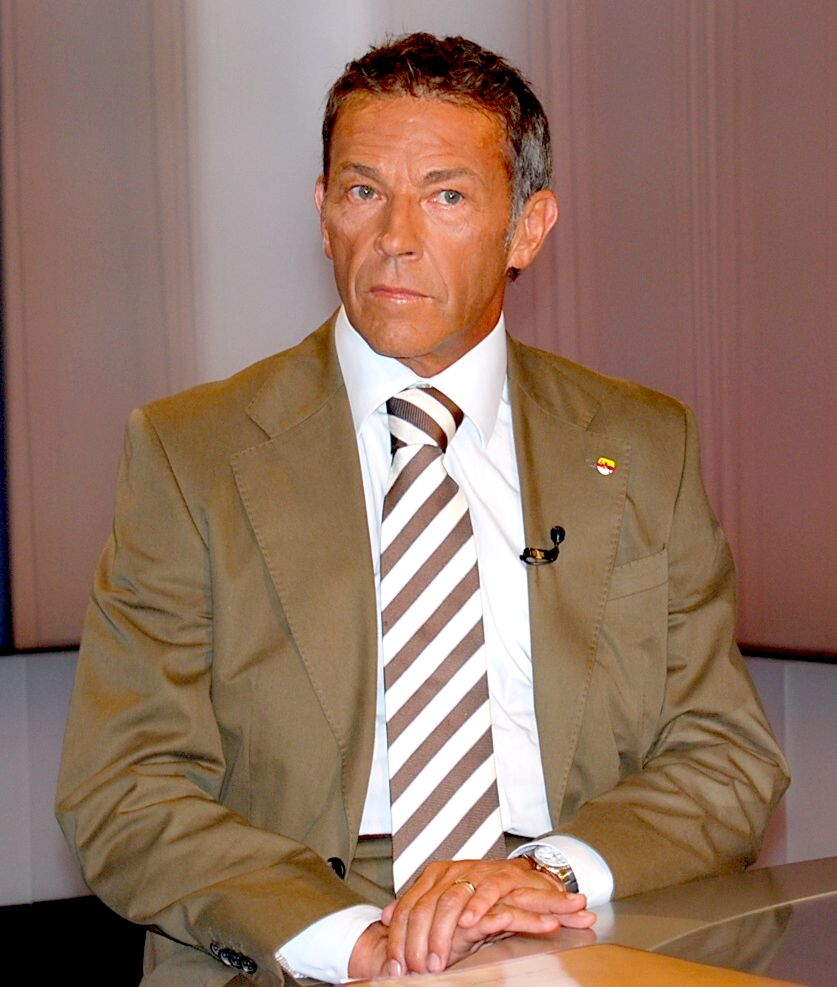

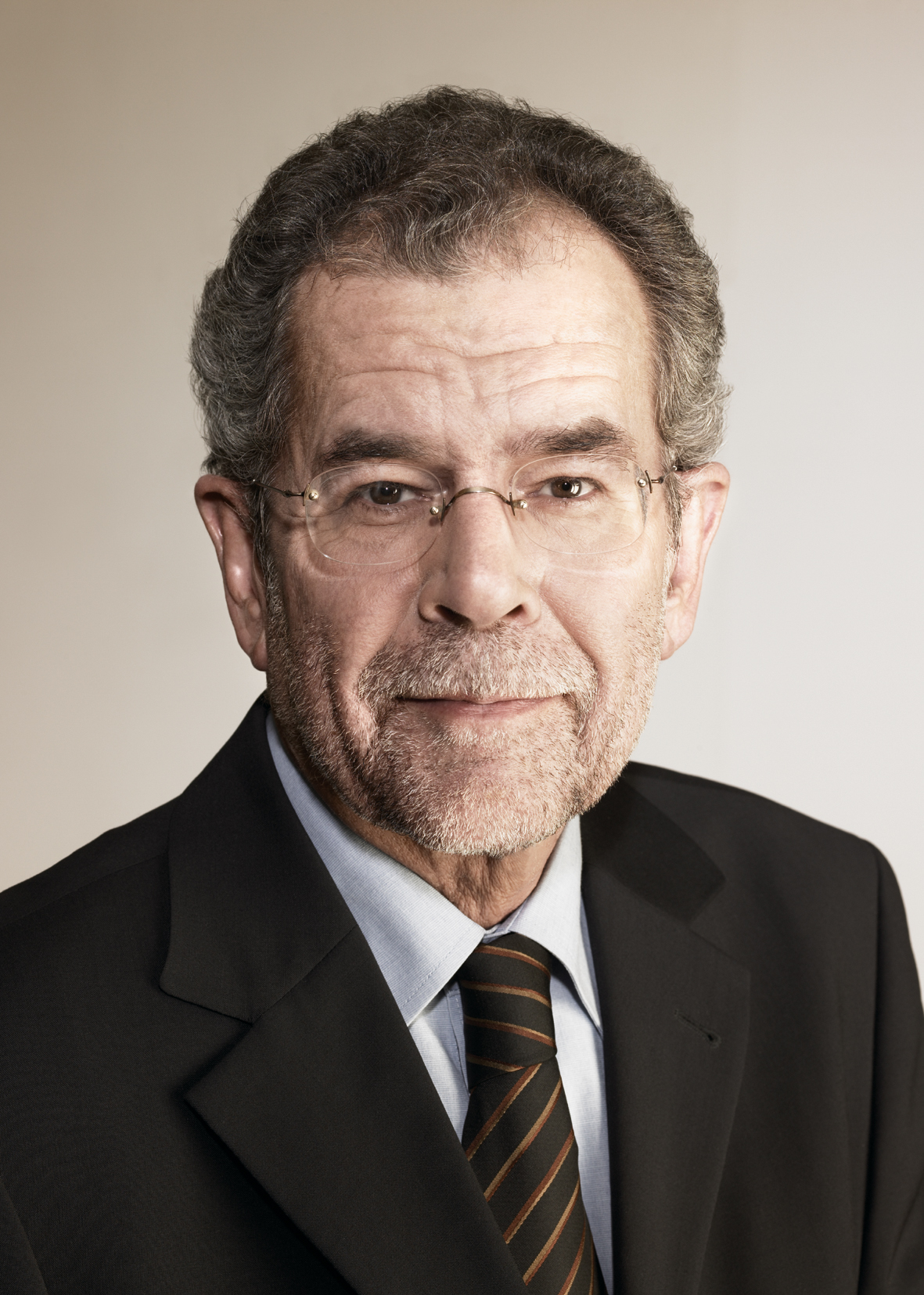

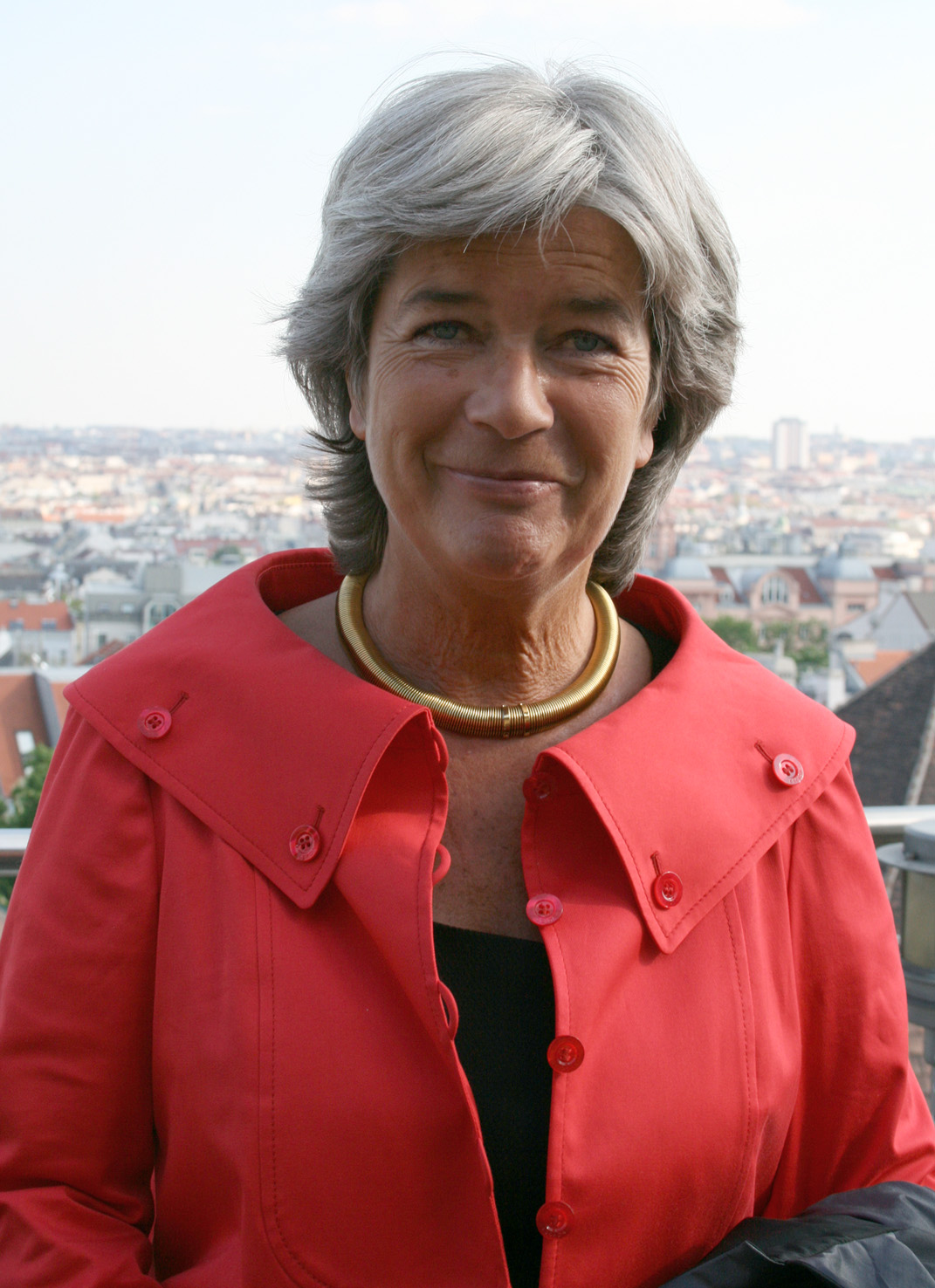
	First party	Second party	Third party
Leader	Werner Faymann	Wilhelm Molterer	Heinz-Christian Strache
Party	SPÖ	ÖVP	FPÖ
Leader since	2008	2007	2005
Leader's seat	9 Vienna	4D Traunviertel	9D Vienna South
Last election	68 seats, 35.34%	66 seats, 34.33%	21 seats, 11.04%
Seats won	57	51	34
Seat change	▼11	▼15	▲13
Popular vote	1,430,206	1,269,656	857,029
Percentage	29.26%	25.98%	17.54%
Swing	▼6.08%	▼8.35%	▲6.50%
	Fourth party	Fifth party	Sixth party
Leader	Jörg Haider	Alexander Van der Bellen	Heide Schmidt
Party	BZÖ	Greens	LiF
Leader since	2008	1997	2008
Leader's seat	2A Klagenfurt	9F Vienna North-West	9F Vienna North-West
Last election	7 seats, 4.11%	21 seats, 11.05%	did not contest on their own
Seats won	21	20	0
Seat change	▲14	▼1	0
Popular vote	522,933	509,936	102,249
Percentage	10.70%	10.43%	2.09%
Swing	▲6.59%	▼0.62%	▲2.09%
Chancellor before election
Alfred Gusenbauer
SPÖ
Elected Chancellor
Werner Faymann
SPÖ

A legislative snap election for the National Council in Austria was held on 28 September 2008. The previous election was held on 1 October 2006. The election (the 24th in Austrian history) was caused by the withdrawal of Austrian People's Party leader Wilhelm Molterer from the governing grand coalition (led by the Social Democratic Party of Austria) on 7 July 2008. Due to dissatisfaction with the grand coalition and the two main parties, it was widely expected to be a realigning election, with gains for the opposition and up to seven parties expected to be in the National Council after the election. The losses for the government parties (both the SPÖ and the ÖVP had the worst election result in history) resulted in strong gains for the far right, while neither the Liberal Forum nor the Citizens' Forum Austria (both of which were considered to have chances of gaining seats) gained as much as 2% of the vote, defying earlier expectations. The result of the election was seen as strong for the far-right and in support of Eurosceptics.

Molterer resigned as party chairman as a result of the losses suffered by the ÖVP and was replaced by environment minister Josef Pröll; the Greens' federal spokesman Alexander Van der Bellen (in office since 1997) also resigned and was replaced by his deputy, Eva Glawischnig. Due to the LIF's failure to enter parliament on its own, LIF founder Heide Schmidt and financier Hans-Peter Haselsteiner both declared their complete withdrawal from politics, and the LIF's fate was seen as uncertain. Shortly after the election, BZÖ leader and Carinthian governor Jörg Haider died in a car accident.

== Inflation, rising prices, transport ==
Inflation was seen as a major election topic. Discussions over solutions to the problem of rising prices began back in February 2008. Gusenbauer proposed to support households with €100 as an offset to the rising prices (known as the Gusi-Hunderter); the ÖVP was against this proposal and supported the abolishment of charges instead. In the end, the coalition compromised by increasing the mileage allowance (Kilometergeld) and the commuter lump sum payment (Pendlerpauschale) and by lowering the unemployed contribution (Arbeitslosenbeiträge) for those who earn least. Furthermore, the cost of the autobahn vignette was not raised, which relieved Austrian motorists by at least €8.4 million.

The ÖVP saw the lowering of brokerage commissions and the charges for arrears letters of debt collection agencies and winter fuel payments for lower-income households as appropriate measures against inflation. The SPÖ proposed a stricter controlling of prices in addition to the reduction of brokerage commissions. FPÖ and BZÖ saw the main problem in the rising fuel prices; the FPÖ demanded a ceiling price for fuel, while the BZÖ, in addition, wanted to reduce taxes on fuels. The BZÖ announced a people's initiative (Volksbegehren) calling for a stop to rising prices (by capping the price of fuel and reducing taxes on fuel, drugs and food); however, due to the necessary timeframe, the period during which people would be able to sign for the initiative would only start after the election, thus limiting its potential impact. "Ecology against inflation" was the concept proposed by the Greens; the Greens wanted to facilitate the changeover to renewable energy in order to reduce energy prices. The Greens stated that the rising oil price, which was the main reason for the high inflation, would quickly nullify other attempts at relief (like tax reductions, winter fuel payments or a higher commuter lump sum payment). The lower inflation would also come at a high cost through a higher trade deficit. In contrast, the Greens called for a conversion of oil and gas heating to wood heatings and for a prescribed redevelopment of badly insulated residential houses to reduce energy consumption and thereby costs. On 25 August 2008, the Greens called for a strong increase in funding for public transport, for a nationwide lorry toll and for a moratorium on road construction.

== Parliamentary sessions in September 2008 ==
A special parliamentary session was to take place in mid-September 2008, shortly before a regular parliamentary session on 24 September 2008 (in order to pass laws before the election, they had to be introduced in a first session and assigned to a committee, whereupon they could then be passed in the second session). The SPÖ announced on 25 August 2008 that it would like to vote on a number of measures against the rising prices before the election, revoking the Stillhalteabkommen with the ÖVP: the halving of value added tax on food, a reduction of the payroll tax, an additional thirteenth family subsidy in October and an increase of home care subsidies. The SPÖ explained its step with the reluctance and refusal of the ÖVP to constructively negotiate on a package of measures against the rising prices. The Greens also called for a vote on abolishing university tuition fees, which the SPÖ had previously refused to do when it still considered itself bound to the Stillhalteabkommen. Faymann became more specific later on the same day, saying that the SPÖ would propose five measures against the rising prices in the session (with some of them previously coordinated with the ÖVP) in what was called a five-point plan; these included three of the above (all except the reduction of the payroll tax) an extension of the special retirement scheme for manual workers (Hacklerregelung) until 2013 and the abolishment of university tuition fees. Faymann stated he didn't expect the ÖVP to seek revenge by supporting the motion of no confidence against Darabos (see below).

Reactions of other parties were mixed: The ÖVP strongly criticised Faymann's decision to revoke the agreement and announced it would also consider outvoting the SPÖ on other issues such as security and immigration, likely with the support of FPÖ and BZÖ. The FPÖ stated it did not believe that the SPÖ would actually outvote the ÖVP before the election but indicated support for some of the measures, but later Strache said he had a number of problems with the proposals and that the FPÖ would not support them unless talks would be held over the precise wording and content of the measures; for instance, Strache called for university tuition fees to be abolished only for European Union citizens, for an end to compulsory membership in the Austrian National Union of Students (Österreichische Hochschülerinnen- und Hochschülerschaft) and for the halving of VAT on food not to apply to luxury goods like caviar, and furthermore called for a reduction of the mineral oil tax and for elimination of VAT on medication. The Greens announced they would support all five proposals except the halving of VAT on food, which they considered not to be an effective measure against the rising prices. The BZÖ was strongly against most of the proposed measures (especially the elimination of university tuition fees), but voiced support for the extension of the Hacklerregelung. The BZÖ later stated it wanted a halving of VAT on medication, as well, and wanted to be recognised as a possible coalition partner by the SPÖ. The SPÖ initially stated it refused secret negotiations with the other parties and package deals, and that whoever wanted the proposals should vote for them as proposed by the SPÖ, but later stated it was willing to sit down and talk with Strache and Haider, if necessary. In a poll from 27 August 2008, 74% of respondents in principle agreed with Faymann's proposals.

At a meeting between Faymann and Molterer on 28 August 2008, the two agreed on a common proposal regarding home care subsidies and decided to seek further talks on the family subsidy increase. They also agreed to hold consultations on the precise date of the special parliamentary session. The ÖVP stated that it would present its own proposal regarding the extension of the Hacklerregelung, however, and would not agree to the elimination of university tuition fees nor the halving of VAT on food.

Under EU rules, there can only be two reduced VAT rates from the general minimum VAT of 15% (both of which have to be above a minimum of 5%). As of 2008, there were reduced VAT rates of 12% for yard sale wine and 10% for food, rent, books, works of art and flowers; should the VAT on food be reduced to 5%, the reduced VAT on yard sale wine would either have to be abolished or reduced further to 10%, according to some; however, a reduction to 10% is impossible as the minimum VAT for yard sale wine is 12%, which is itself an exemption from the general rule banning VAT reductions for alcoholic beverages. The SPÖ argued that the reduced VAT rate for yard sale wine was a special exemption agreed upon in the Act of Accession and did therefore not qualify as the second reduced VAT rate; the ÖVP-led finance ministry claimed that this exemption had been converted into Austria's official second reduced VAT rate since the accession, and this was confirmed on 8 September 2008 by the spokeswoman of the European Commission.

Faymann announced he would be holding talks with the other parties in the week of 8–14 September 2008, but ruled out acquiescing to the FPÖ's demands regarding the abolition of university tuition fees only for Austrians or the reduction of VAT on medication. Faymann met with Strache on 8 September 2008, which the ÖVP criticised as "being the first step to an SPÖ–FPÖ coalition". On 9 September 2008, Faymann announced he was considering exempting luxury goods from the reduction of the VAT on food and also reducing the VAT on medication, in a compromise move to secure the agreement of the FPÖ and the BZÖ. The ÖVP and the Greens strongly criticised the SPÖ for this move.

The SPÖ officially brought forward the motion for the special session on 9 September 2008 and wanted the special parliamentary session to take place on 12 September 2008, while the ÖVP preferred 15 September 2008 or 7 September 2008 (the latest possible date); it was assumed at that point that the halving of VAT on food and medication would pass with the votes of the FPÖ and the BZÖ after the SPÖ's compromise on luxury goods and medication, that the increase of home care subsidies would pass with the votes of the ÖVP, the Hacklerregelung extension with the votes of the FPÖ and the BZÖ and the additional thirteenth family subsidy in October with the votes of all parties. The passage of the abolition of university tuition fees was not certain, but it was reported that the SPÖ might agree to a compromise by abolishing it only for European Union citizens and halving it for all foreigners, with exceptions for students who took too long with their studies. President of the National Council Barbara Prammer (SPÖ) on 10 September 2008 set the date of the special session for 12 September 2008 as preferred by the SPÖ and the FPÖ but against the wishes of the ÖVP, the Greens and the BZÖ, who strongly criticised Prammer's decision. On 11 September 2008, the ÖVP announced it would present its own motions in two cases instead of supporting the SPÖ's proposals, despite the ÖVP mostly agreeing in their positions; the ÖVP's extension of the Hacklerregelung foresees a longer transitional arrangement until 2023, however. The ÖVP did not explain why it wanted to introduce a motion which was nearly identical to the SPÖ's regarding the thirteenth family subsidy. The Greens stated they would introduce a number of motions, including one calling for a month of paternity leave (Papamonat) and two motions calling for same-sex marriage and civil unions (for both heterosexual and homosexual couples). The FPÖ and the BZÖ also announced the introduction of a large number of measures.

At the special parliamentary session on 12 September 2008, twenty-six motions were approved, which means they were forwarded to the responsible parliamentary committee and were to be up for a vote on 24 September 2008. They included:

- all motions of Faymann's five-point plan (SPÖ, together with others),
- separate motions on the Hacklerregelung and the thirteenth family subsidy (ÖVP),
- making the appointment of a committee of inquiry a parliamentary minority right (Greens),
- a reduction of the Austrian Chamber of Labour apportionment (Arbeiterkammer-Umlage) (BZÖ),
- an income-contingent maternity/paternity leave subsidy (ÖVP and Greens),
- the reduction of VAT on medication (BZÖ),
- a nationally valid ticket for public transport (Österreich-Ticket) (ÖVP),
- increasing federal subsidies for public transport (Greens),
- making referendums on new EU treaties mandatory (FPÖ).

The motion on halving VAT on food was only passed because a few ÖVP and Green MPs happened to be absent from the session at the time of the vote, a fact which Schüssel was verbosely irate about.

At the regular parliamentary session on 24 September 2008, all motions of Faymann's five-point plan were approved except for the halving of VAT on food; both the SPÖ's and the ÖVP's motion on the Hacklerregelung were approved and it was not immediately clear what legal effect that would have, as they partially contradicted each other. The reduction of VAT on medication (from 20% to 10%) was also approved. The committee of inquiry motion was approved, but will have to be taken up by the next parliament as a change in parliamentary law; similarly, the income-contingent maternity/paternity leave subsidy was approved, but will have to be taken up by the next parliament. The reduction of the Arbeiterkammer-Umlage failed, as did free public transport and mandatory referendums on EU treaties (which lacked the necessary two-thirds majority, as the ÖVP and the Greens voted against it). The laws that were passed still had to be confirmed by the Federal Council, although the Federal Council can not actually veto any motions passed by the National Council.

In a last-minute move, the ÖVP tried to delay the abolition of university tuition fees by proposing a referendum on the issue, but this was voted down.

== Referendum on future treaties of the European Union ==
One of the main reasons cited by the ÖVP as grounds for causing a snap election was the change in the SPÖ's stance on the ratification of future treaties of the European Union. In a letter addressed to Hans Dichand and printed in his newspaper, the Kronen Zeitung, the SPÖ explained the new position as follows: "We are of the opinion that, on the basis of continuous information and an open discussion, future treaty changes which affect Austrian interests should be decided on in a referendum in Austria." (Auf der Basis einer kontinuierlichen Information und einer offenen Diskussion sind wir der Meinung, dass zukünftige Vertragsänderungen, die die österreichischen Interessen berühren, durch eine Volksabstimmung in Österreich entschieden werden sollen.) When the Treaty of Lisbon had been ratified in parliament in April 2008, the SPÖ had defended the solely parliamentary ratification.

Apart from the ÖVP, the Greens also criticised the new SPÖ position on the EU, pointing out that the Kronen Zeitung regularly shored up opposition and irrational fears of the EU in the Austrian population. Member of the European Parliament Johannes Voggenhuber accused the SPÖ of "forming an axis with those groups which try to obstruct European integration through referendums." ([...] eine Achse mit jenen Gruppen zu bilden, die versuchen, mit der Volksabstimmung die europäische Integration zu behindern.).

FPÖ and BZÖ, which had demanded a referendum before the ratification of the Treaty of Lisbon, claimed that the SPÖ was untrustworthy, as it had just ratified the Treaty of Lisbon in parliament without a referendum. FPÖ leader Strache claimed in this context that the SPÖ had conducted "politics against the Austrian population" (Politik gegen die eigene Bevölkerung).

== Crime, integration and right to stay ==
Integration was also an important point in the election campaign. The Greens called for an unconditional right to stay (Bleiberecht) for children and adolescents, while the ÖVP secretary-general Hannes Missethon announced a campaign against asylum abuse; it was remarked that the ÖVP appeared to lead an anti-immigration campaign in order to gain votes from voters sympathetic to FPÖ and BZÖ, although the ÖVP criticised Strache's calls for only two health insurances organisations (one for Austrians, one for immigrants) as "completely absurd" and "polemic.

In July 2008, Carinthian governor Jörg Haider (BZÖ) repeatedly came into conflict with interior minister Maria Fekter (ÖVP) when he tried to remove asylum seekers from Carinthia to other states, which was a clear violation of Carinthia's obligations to the federal state; Haider claimed that all of the asylum seekers in question were criminals, but this turned out to be untrue. Green MP Peter Pilz stated he would report Haider to the police for abuse of position and divulging official secrets, as there were indications that Haider publicised information from the EKIS police information system.

Fekter proposed on 7 August 2008 to introduce the expression "cultural offence" (Kulturdelikt) for crimes which are a tradition in some immigrants' home countries (like honour killings, female genital cutting and forced marriage) in order to put a strong emphasis on the sense of right and wrong, which she claimed was often not present in the perpetrators of such crimes. She was heavily criticised by SPÖ justice minister Berger and a number of NGO spokespersons.

The Greens proposed on 9 September 2008 that all children born to parents who are legally staying in Austria should be given Austrian citizenship; they also called for an increase in assistance for German language courses.

On 11 September 2008, justice minister Berger and interior minister Fekter agreed on the Gewaltschutzpaket, a package of measures increasing protection for victims of crimes and stricter punishments for sex offenders (including employment bans and a national register of sex offenders). The ministers hoped the package would be passed by the newly elected National Council while the new government was being formed.

== Kindergarten and compulsory education ==
A topic of discussion was the affordability and availability of kindergartens. The SPÖ had long called for subsidising the last year of kindergarten so that parents would not have to pay for it, while at the same time making it compulsory (hitherto the last year of kindergarten was only compulsory for children who are diagnosed with speech deficiencies). While the ÖVP had long been against this demand, Molterer changed his mind and announced on 4 August 2008 that he supported a compulsory and cost-free last kindergarten year. Molterer had to convince the ÖVP sections in the nine states of this change which he did by 7 August 2008. The SPÖ responded positively to Molterer's change of mind, while the opposition parties criticised Molterer for suddenly agreeing with the SPÖ after having obstructed the government for so long.

Mayor and governor of Vienna Michael Häupl had earlier called for antedating compulsory education instead, introducing a compulsory year of pre-school before primary school and abolishing the compulsory ninth year of education; his proposal did not meet with much approval, however, and experts stated that the European trend was going in the other direction (lengthening compulsory education to keep teenagers in the education system for a longer time). Styria had decided in late July 2008 to subsidise kindergartens in Styria, making them completely cost-free. The Greens called for mirroring this in all of Austria, providing free child care for children aged one year or older; the costs of €400 million would have to be born by the federal state.

== Privatisation of Austrian Airlines ==
While Austrian Airlines CEO Alfred Ötsch called for retaining the independence of Austrian Airlines (AUA), he changed his mind once Saudi Arabian investor Mohamed Bin Issa Al Jaber decided not to go through with his plans to invest €150 million into the corporation. Due to the worsening situation for airlines it is now seen as necessary to find a strong partner for the AUA; airlines which had expressed an interest include Lufthansa, Air France–KLM, Aeroflot, Royal Jordanian, Air China, Turkish Airlines and Singapore Airlines (though Aeroflot has since rejected investing into the AUA). In order for the investment plans to go through, the outgoing government had to agree to give the Österreichische Industrieholding AG (ÖIAG) the mandate to privatise; SPÖ and ÖVP disagreed, however, how much of the 42.75% of AUA shares the ÖIAG holds should be offered for sale. The SPÖ insisted on retaining a blocking minority of 25% plus one share, as Faymann voiced fears that the position of Vienna International Airport as the main hub for Eastern Europe and the Balkans might otherwise be endangered; while the ÖVP agreed that it would be preferable to retain a blocking minority, it did not see this as a condition for the privatisation and preferred to give the ÖIAG a broad mandate for privatisation so that the best partner airline could be found; economy minister Martin Bartenstein voiced his preference for a sale to Lufthansa, which had stated it was only interested in a complete acquisition of the AUA. At a meeting on 5 August 2008 it was agreed that a blocking minority would have to remain in Austrian hands, but that this did not necessarily mean that the shares had to be held by the ÖIAG; the blocking minority shares could also be bought by Austrian corporations. The Greens criticised the solution as a botch-up typical of the grand coalition, claiming that either the ÖIAG should keep the blocking minority or no one at all and also alluding to possible cases of favouritism towards industrialists close to SPÖ and ÖVP; both the Greens and the FPÖ called for the resignation of Ötsch and ÖIAG director Peter Michaelis, and the FPÖ proposed that Vienna International Airport should instead buy a blocking minority of the AUA shares. The BZÖ supported the agreement between SPÖ and ÖVP and claimed to have proposed a solution with a strategic partner for the AUA long before, even when all other parties had called for stand-alone solution.

Lufthansa announced on 7 August 2008 that it was interested in the AUA despite the blocking minority clause. The Raiffeisen Zentralbank, the Oberbank and industrialist Hannes Androsch stated they are not interested in increasing their shares of the AUA, while the Vienna Insurance Group was considering this; it thus appeared that the ÖIAG might have to hold most of its shares in order for Austria to hold a blocking minority. The official decision to give the ÖIAG a mandate to privatise the AUA was made at a cabinet meeting on 12 August 2008.

Five airlines were initially reported to be actually interested in the AUA (Lufthansa, Air France–KLM, Turkish Airlines, Air China and S7 Airlines, a former Aeroflot subsidiary); other airlines likely also requested material necessary for bidding in attempts to obtain information about a competing company. So far, Lufthansa, Turkish Airlines and S7 Airlines have confirmed the reports about their interests. British Airways was announced on 29 August 2008 to be among the twelve potential buyers, as well. The first concepts had to be submitted by 12 September 2008 and binding offers by 21 October 2008, with the actual decision to be made on 27 October 2008. Turkish Airlines missed one of the first deadlines and thus dropped out, while Air China could not cope with the strict timetable; four airlines submitted preliminary by 12 September 2008 (Lufthansa, Air France–KLM, British Airways and S7 Airlines), of which three were then put on the shortlist. Reportedly, S7 Airlines offered the highest bid, Lufthansa and Air France–KLM offered less and British Airways declined to submit a binding offer. Reportedly, only Lufthansa submitted a binding offer by 21 October 2008, with Air France–KLM supposedly more interested in Alitalia and S7 Airlines pursuing cooperation with Air Berlin and FlyNiki; it was considered likely that the privatisation would postponed due to the weak participation and low offers, or that the Austrian state would have to renationalise Austrian Airlines. On 27 October 2008, the privatisation mandate was extended until 31 December 2008. Contrary to earlier reports, S7 Airlines was also still bidding, but Lufthansa was seen as the clear favorite nonetheless. On 13 November 2008, Lufthansa was declared to be the only bidder still in the race by the ÖIAG board of directors.

Air France–KLM threatened to sue the Austrian state in case the AUA was sold to Lufthansa, accusing Austria of changing the rules while the bidding process had already started in order to favour Lufthansa. Lufthansa approved the takeover on 3 December 2008 (following which the AUA's stock price rose sharply), with the ÖIAG expected to approve it on 5 December 2008.

== Budgets, TV schedule, fairness accord ==
The parties have announced the following budgets for election campaigning:

Party	SPÖ	ÖVP	GRÜNE	FPÖ	BZÖ	LIF	FRITZ	KPÖ	RETTÖ	DC
Budget	€9,500,000	€8,500,000	€3,000,000	€3,000,000	€1,000,000	€1,800,000	€1,000,000	€140,000	€100,000	not released

As usual, the leading candidates of the five parties with their own parliamentary group faced off in ten TV debates Tuesdays and Thursdays (starting with FPÖ–BZÖ – the only exception, as it occurs on a Friday – and finishing with SPÖ–ÖVP), the leading candidates also faced questions from two journalists on Sundays and there were three heavyweight rounds, one with the five main parties leading candidates, one with leading female politicians from the five main parties and one with the other five parties contesting the election in all nine states; all of this was broadcast on ORF2 and also available online on the ORF's election website, wahl08.orf.at. Private television stations also broadcast TV debates with the five main parties: ATV broadcast a debate with questions fielded via YouTube and Puls 4 also broadcast a similar debate. In both debates, SPÖ leading candidate Faymann was not present as he stated he had already got other appointments for the dates in question; ATV and Puls 4 refused to accept Josef Cap as a substitute. The debate on Puls 4 also featured LIF leading candidate Schmidt.

The SPÖ proposed a "fairness accord" (Fairnessabkommen) to ensure a fair and decent election campaign; a first meeting with other parties was held on 6 August 2008, but only ÖVP, BZÖ and LIF participated; the FPÖ refused to participate (saying it wanted a fair election campaign, but that an accord was not required), the Greens could not attend the meeting due to organisational problems and Save Austria claimed to have been informed of a change of the time of the meeting too late. Another meeting was held on 13 August 2008, but the parties failed to agree on an accord, mostly because of the FPÖ's refusal to enter into any kind of accord; all parties nonetheless claimed to want to adhere to a certain code of fairness.

== Eurofighter Typhoon contract renegotiation ==
The ÖVP–FPÖ (later ÖVP–BZÖ) coalition had on 1 July 2003 entered into a contract for eighteen Eurofighter Typhoon interceptor aircraft to replace the obsolete Saab 35 Draken interceptor aircraft; one of the SPÖ's election promises in the 2006 election had been to renegotiate the contract, as the Eurofighter Typhoon was considered by many people (especially by supporters of the SPÖ and the Greens) as being too expensive and having unnecessary offensive capabilities not necessary for the protection of the Austrian airspace. Following the election, SPÖ MP Norbert Darabos became defence minister; he did not succeed in cancelling the contract, as had been the SPÖ's goal (through using perceived illegalities and shadowy details in the contract and its associated countertrades), but only managed to reduce the number from eighteen to fifteen aircraft and to obtain cheaper second-hand aircraft instead of newly built ones. A report from the Austrian Court of Auditors published on 22 August 2008 stated that the claimed cost reduction of €370 million was incorrect and that at most €267 million had been saved in expenses. The Greens announced they would propose a motion of no confidence against Darabos, which the BZÖ immediately stated they would support; the ÖVP stated it might also support the motion. The FPÖ waited to see the precise content of the motion before deciding whether to support it or not; Darabos stated he believed the SPÖ might have to react and take measures against the ÖVP if it supported the motion of no confidence.

== Role of the Kronen Zeitung ==
The Kronen Zeitung, the leading Austrian tabloid read by almost three million people, was perceived to be strongly supportive of Werner Faymann and the SPÖ following the letter to the editor sent by Gusenbauer and Faymann regarding referendums on European Union issues. When the ÖVP tried on 28 August 2008 to counter the campaign conducted against it by advertising in the Kronen Zeitung with a full-page advertisement meant to look like the "letters to the editor" section (which was full of letters heavily criticising the ÖVP and praising the SPÖ), but containing letters questioning the Kronen Zeitung's stance in the election and criticising Faymann and the SPÖ, the Kronen Zeitung refused to accept the advertisement, questioning whether it should let advertisements appear in its pages which criticised the newspaper. On 29 August 2008, ÖVP secretary-general Hannes Missethon strongly criticised the Kronen Zeitung for this refusal and called on the publisher Hans Dichand to contest the election himself if he wanted to become chancellor, but to cease pushing Faymann and bashing Molterer.
