= Maria Fekter =

Austrian politician

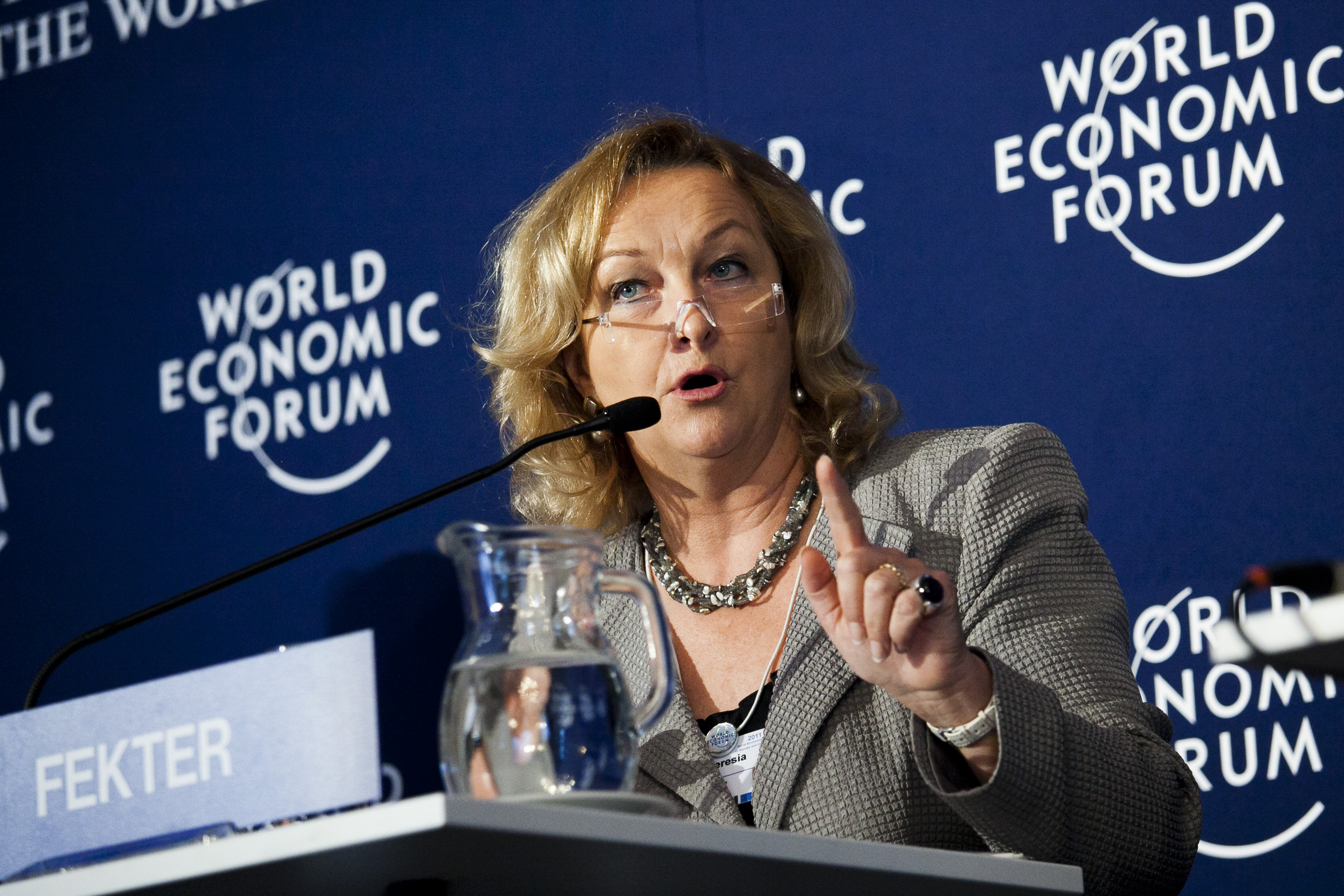

Minister of Finance
- In office 21 April 2011 – 16 December 2013
- Chancellor: Werner Faymann
- Preceded by: Josef Pröll
- Succeeded by: Michael Spindelegger

Minister of the Interior
- In office 1 July 2008 – 21 April 2011
- Chancellor: Alfred Gusenbauer; Werner Faymann
- Preceded by: Wilhelm Molterer (Acting)
- Succeeded by: Johanna Mikl-Leitner

Personal details
- Born: 1 February 1956 (age 70) Attnang-Puchheim, Austria
- Party: People's Party
- Education: Johannes Kepler University Linz

Maria Theresia Fekter is an Austrian politician (ÖVP) and was the Austrian Minister of Finance between 2011 and 2013. Before that, she was Minister of the Interior.

On 27 June 2008, it was announced by her party that she was to be appointed as the new Interior Minister in the Gusenbauer cabinet, following Günther Platter, who became the new Governor of Tyrol. During her career as Interior Minister, she became known as a hardliner, especially when it came to immigration and asylum policies, earning her the unofficial title of an Austrian "Iron Lady". Fekter is also often referred to as "Schottermitzi" (Note: The nickname roughly translates to "Gravel Mary"; 'Mitzi' is the colloquial nickname form of Mary in Viennese dialect) due to her family's involvement with the gravel industry.

== Early life and career ==
Fekter attended the Sisters of the Cross gymnasium in Gmunden then attended the grammar school Kreuzschwestern Gmunden. She obtained her Matura in 1975 from the commercial academy in Vöcklabruck. Afterward, she studied law, graduating from Johannes Kepler University Linz as a Doctor of Law in 1979. She then went on to obtain her Magistra rerum socialium oeconomicarumque from her alma mater in 1982. After graduating she worked in her parents' gravel pit and carrying business, becoming a managing partner in 1986.

In 1986 she became a municipal councillor in Attnang-Puchheim, which she did until 1990. From 1990 to 1994 she was State Secretary in the Ministry of Economic Affairs, and later a Member of the National Council (Parliament) from 1994 to 2007. During this time she was a Member of the executive committee (Präsidium) of the Österreichischer Wirtschaftsbund from 1990 to 1995, and again since 2008. From 2007 to 2008 she was a Ombudsman (Volksanwältin) of Austria, before becoming Federal Minister of the Interior from 2008 to 2011. Afterward, she served as Minister of Finance from 2011 to 2013.

== Other activities ==
- Salzburg Festival, member of the board of trustees (since 2013)
- African Development Bank, member of the board of governors (2011–2013)

== Notes ==
Political offices
Preceded by Günther Platter	Minister of the Interior; 2008–2011	Succeeded by Johanna Mikl-Leitner
Preceded by Josef Pröll	Minister of Finance; 2011–2013	Succeeded by Michael Spindelegger
