= Hans Jörg Schelling =

Austrian entrepreneur and politician

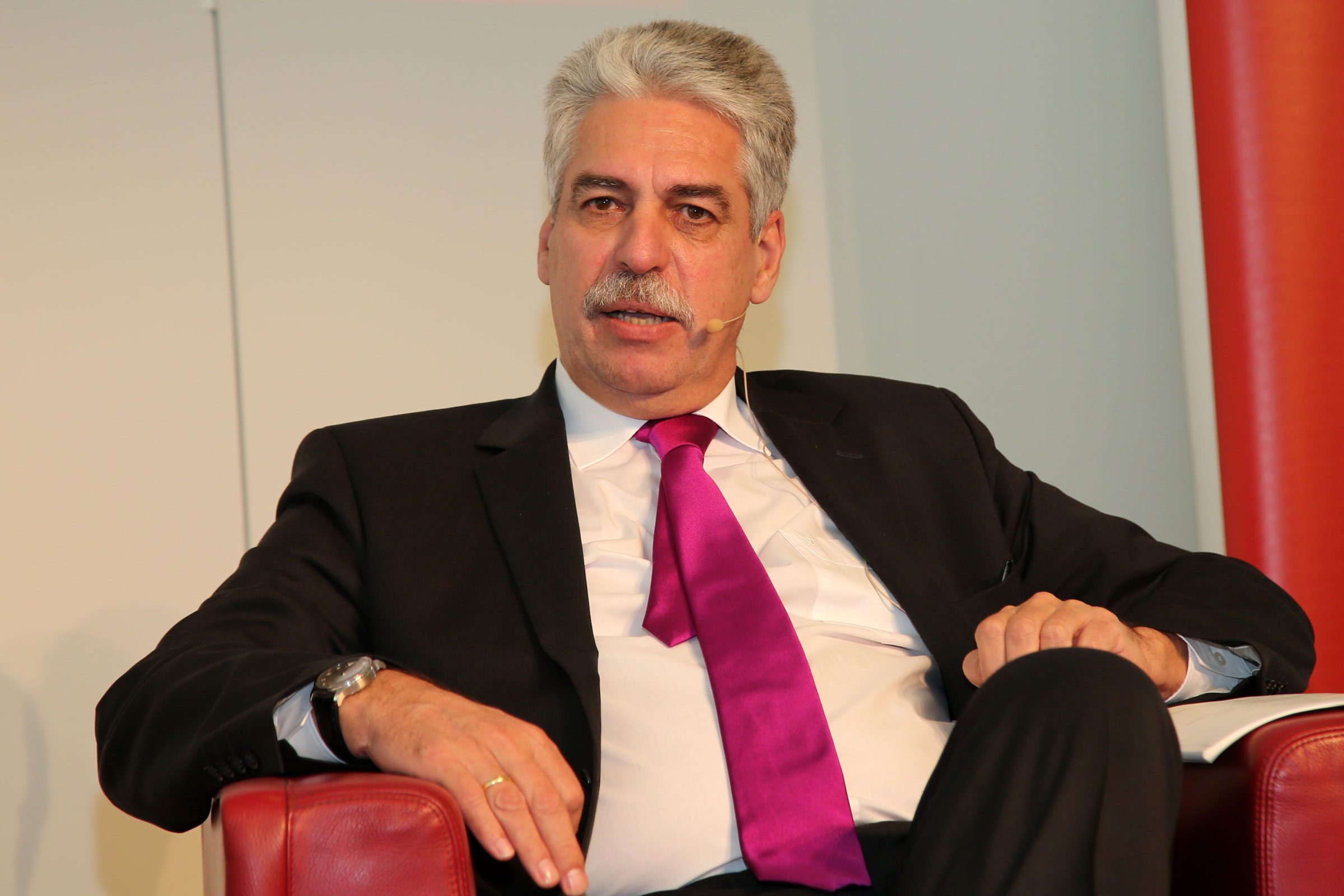
- Schelling in 2015

Minister of Finance
- In office 1 September 2014 – 18 December 2017
- Chancellor: Werner Faymann; Christian Kern
- Preceded by: Michael Spindelegger
- Succeeded by: Hartwig Löger

Personal details
- Born: Johann Georg Schelling; 27 December 1953 (age 72) Hohenems, Austria
- Party: People's Party
- Education: Johannes Kepler University

Johann Georg "Hans Jörg" Schelling (Austrian German pronunciation: [ˈhans ˈjœrɡ ˈʃɛlɪŋ]; born 27 December 1953) is an Austrian entrepreneur and politician of the Austrian People's Party and who served as Minister of Finance of Austria in the governments of chancellors Werner Faymann and Christian Kern.

== Early career ==
A native of Vorarlberg in western Austria, Schelling was a millionaire management consultant before entering politics. Over the course of his career, he made a fortune by building two separate home-furnishing chains into market leaders.

== Political career ==
During his time in office as Minister of Finance, Schelling was in charge of managing the fallout of the 2008 financial crisis. In 2016, he closed FIMBAG, the agency it set up in 2008 during the crisis to oversee state aid granted to troubled lenders. He successfully pushed through legislation paving the way for the government to reach settlements with the creditors of defunct bank Hypo Alpe Adria and remove a millstone from the country's public finances.

Under Schelling's leadership, Austria asked France in 2015 to hand over tax data linked to leaked client data of multinational banking and financial services company HSBC which had admitted failings in compliance at its Swiss private bank. He also supported state-owned utility OMV in its negotiations on an asset swap with Gazprom and in 2016 took part in the ceremony, in which OMV agreed to exchange a stake in its Norwegian business for a stake in the Russian group's Achimov oil and gas exploration blocks; the deal was later abandoned due to opposition from Norway.

From 2015, Schelling chaired the group of EU Member States that want to adopt a common tax on financial transactions.

== Life after politics ==
In 2019, Schelling was nominated to serve as a member of the supervisory board at OMV; shortly after, the nomination was withdrawn due to a potential breach of the Austrian government's rules on a cooling-off period for former ministers.

== Other activities ==
=== Corporate boards ===
- Österreichische Volksbanken-Aktiengesellschaft (ÖVAG), chairman of the supervisory board (2012–2014)
- Nord Stream 2, Adviser (2018–present)

=== Regulatory bodies ===
- African Development Bank (AfDB), Ex-Officio Member of the Board of Governors (2015–2017)
- Asian Development Bank (ADB), Ex-Officio Member of the Board of Governors (2014–2017)
- Asian Infrastructure Investment Bank (AIIB), Ex-Officio Member of the Board of Governors (2015–2017)
- European Bank for Reconstruction and Development (EBRD), Ex-Officio Member of the Board of Governors (2014–2017)
- European Investment Bank (EIB), Ex-Officio Member of the Board of Governors (2014–2017)
- European Stability Mechanism (ESM), Member of the Board of Governors (2014–2017)
- Inter-American Investment Corporation (IIC), Ex-Officio Member of the Board of Governors (2014–2017)
- Multilateral Investment Guarantee Agency (MIGA), World Bank Group, Ex-Officio Member of the Board of Governors (2014–2017)
- World Bank, Ex-Officio Member of the Board of Governors (2014–2017)

=== Non-profit organizations ===
- Federation of Social Insurance Providers, chairman of the Board (2009–2014

== Personal life ==
Schelling is married and has two daughters. He is a collector of modern art and enjoys spending time on Stiftsweingut Herzogenburg, the vineyard he operates in his adopted province of Lower Austria.

Political offices
Preceded by Michael Spindelegger	Minister of Finance; 2014–2017	Succeeded by Hartwig Löger
