= Pröll =

Pröll is a German surname. Notable people with the surname include:

== Politics ==
- Alexander Pröll (born 1990), Austrian politician
- Erwin Pröll (born 1946), Austrian politician, governor (Landeshauptmann) of Lower Austria
- Josef Pröll (born 1968), Austrian former politician, Vice Chancellor and Minister

== Sports ==
- Annemarie Moser-Pröll (born 1953), Austrian alpine ski racer
- Cornelia Pröll (born 1961), Austrian former alpine skier
- Markus Pröll (born 1979), German former soccer player
- Martin Pröll (born 1981), Austrian track and field athlete

== Other ==
- Fritz Pröll (1915–1944), German resistance fighter
- Roland Pröll (born 1949), German pianist, conductor, composer, musicologist, and professor of music
