= Michael Spindelegger =

Austrian politician (born 1959)

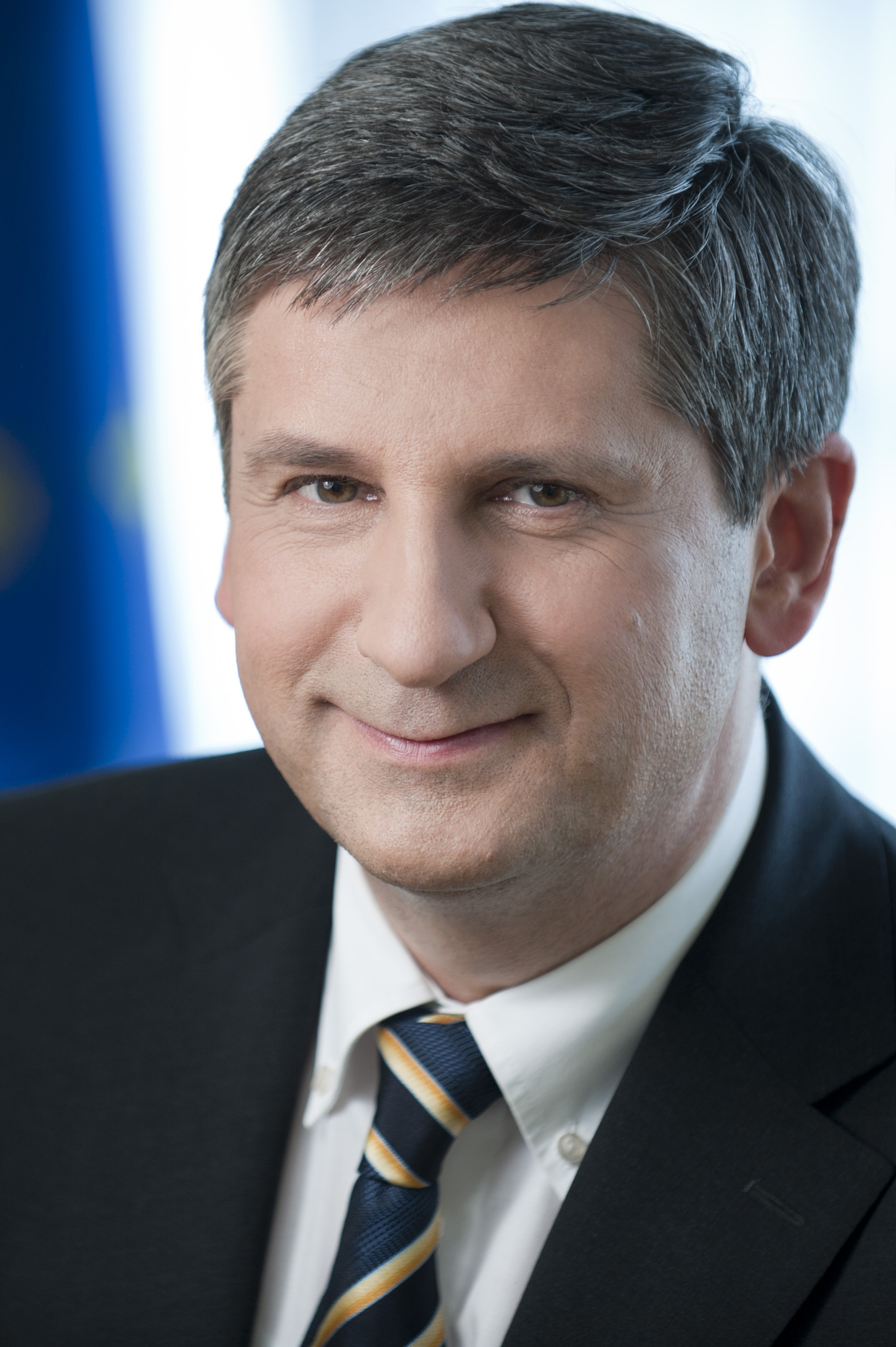

Vice-Chancellor of Austria
- In office 21 April 2011 – 1 September 2014
- Chancellor: Werner Faymann
- Preceded by: Josef Pröll
- Succeeded by: Reinhold Mitterlehner

Minister of Finance
- In office 16 December 2013 – 1 September 2014
- Chancellor: Werner Faymann
- Preceded by: Maria Fekter
- Succeeded by: Hans Jörg Schelling

Minister of Foreign Affairs
- In office 2 December 2008 – 16 December 2013
- Chancellor: Werner Faymann
- Preceded by: Ursula Plassnik
- Succeeded by: Sebastian Kurz

Personal details
- Born: 21 December 1959 (age 66) Mödling, Austria
- Party: Austrian People's
- Spouse: Margit Spindelegger
- Children: 2 sons
- Education: University of Vienna

Michael Spindelegger (Austrian German pronunciation: [ˈmɪçaeːl ˈʃpɪndl̩ˌɛɡɐ]; born 21 December 1959) is an Austrian politician. He served in the cabinet of Chancellor Werner Faymann as foreign minister of Austria from 2008 to 2013 and as finance minister from 2013 to 2014; additionally, he held the office of vice-chancellor from 2011 to 2014. Spindelegger was also the leader of the Austrian People's Party (ÖVP) from 2011 to 2014. In August 2014 he unexpectedly resigned from all political positions. Since 2016, he has been serving as Director General of the Vienna-based International Centre for Migration Policy Development (ICMPD).

== Early and personal life ==
Spindelegger was born in Mödling, Lower Austria. His father Erich, a railway worker and union leader, was mayor of Hinterbrühl, a suburb of Vienna, and represented the Mödling district in the National Council in the Austrian Parliament. He went to school in Hinterbrühl (1965–1969) and to the Keimgasse gymnasium in Mödling (1969–1977). From 1977 to 1978 he served for one year in the Austrian Armed Forces, being trained as a reserve officer. From 1978 he studied law at the University of Vienna, and received a doctorate in law in 1983. During his studies, he joined a Cartellverband Catholic student fraternity at the university. Spindelegger is married, and has two sons.

== Professional career ==
From 1982 to 1983, Spindelegger was Assistant Lecturer and Researcher at the Institute of Criminal Law, University of Vienna.

From 1983 to 1984, he worked as a judge's assistant at several Courts of Law in Vienna, and from 1984 to 1987 as a civil servant for the Federal State of Lower Austria.

From 1987 to 1990, he worked for Austrian Defense Minister Robert Lichal, and between 1990 and 1994 for a number of companies in Austria and Germany, including Siemens.

== Political career ==
From 1992 to 1993, Spindelegger was Member of the Federal Council of Austria.

From January 1995 to October 1996, Spindelegger was Member of the European Parliament, where he served on the Committee on Economic and Monetary Affairs and Industrial Policy.

From December 1993 to March 1995, and since October 1996, Spindelegger was a member of the National Council of Austria (Nationalrat). Between October 1996 and October 2006, he was his party's Speaker on Foreign Affairs, and head of the Parliamentary Committee on Foreign Affairs.

From 1991 Spindelegger was the deputy federal chairperson of his party's labour wing, the Austrian Workers' and Employees' Association (ÖAAB) and, from 2009, the organization's federal chairman. From January 2000 to January 2007, he was Member of the Parliamentary Assembly of the Council of Europe, and from January 2002 to October 2006 head of the Austrian delegation.

From March 2000 to October 2006, he was vice-chairman of the Austrian People's Party, under the leadership of Wolfgang Schüssel.

On 30 October 2006 Spindelegger became Second Speaker of the Austrian Parliament. He held this office until November 2008.

=== Foreign Minister of Austria, 2008–2013 ===
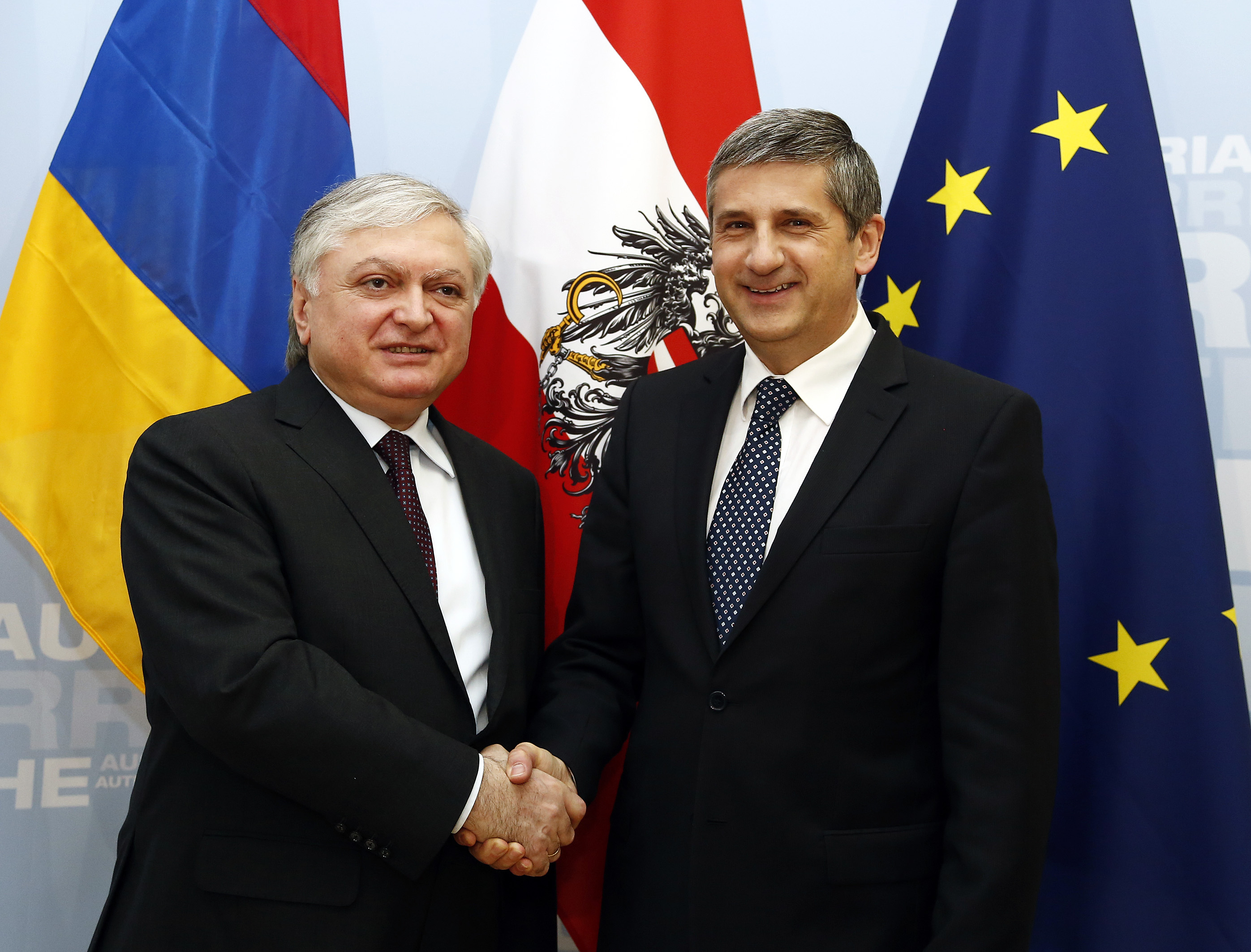
Spindelegger with Armenian foreign minister Eduard Nalbandyan, 25 February 2013

Between 2008 and 2013 Spindelegger served as Foreign Minister of Austria, in April 2011 he additionally took over the post of vice chancellor from Josef Pröll. He was elected ÖVP party chairman in May 2011.

In 2011, Austrian police arrested an ex-Soviet officer, Mikhail Golovatov, wanted in Lithuania for war crimes. Golovatov was released the next day. Spindelegger defended the decision to release Golovatov by stating information from Lithuania was too vague. Former Estonian president Toomas Hendrik Ilves has accused Spindelegger of personally intervening in the case with the Austrian border police in order to please the Russian government.

As foreign minister, Spindelegger worked closely with international organisations in the field of migration and contributed to the policy debate during the Third EU-Africa Summit in Tripoli. After he was appointed as Vice-Chancellor, he created a "State Secretariat for Integration" within the Austrian Federal Ministry of Interior and nominated Sebastian Kurz for the position. At this time, he worked closely with the Ministry of Interior on asylum and labour migration issues while also negotiating a re-admission agreement with the Afghan Government. In 2011, Spindelegger appointed the then 24-year-old Sebastian Kurz as an integration secretary saying later, that he groomed Kurz to be his successor.

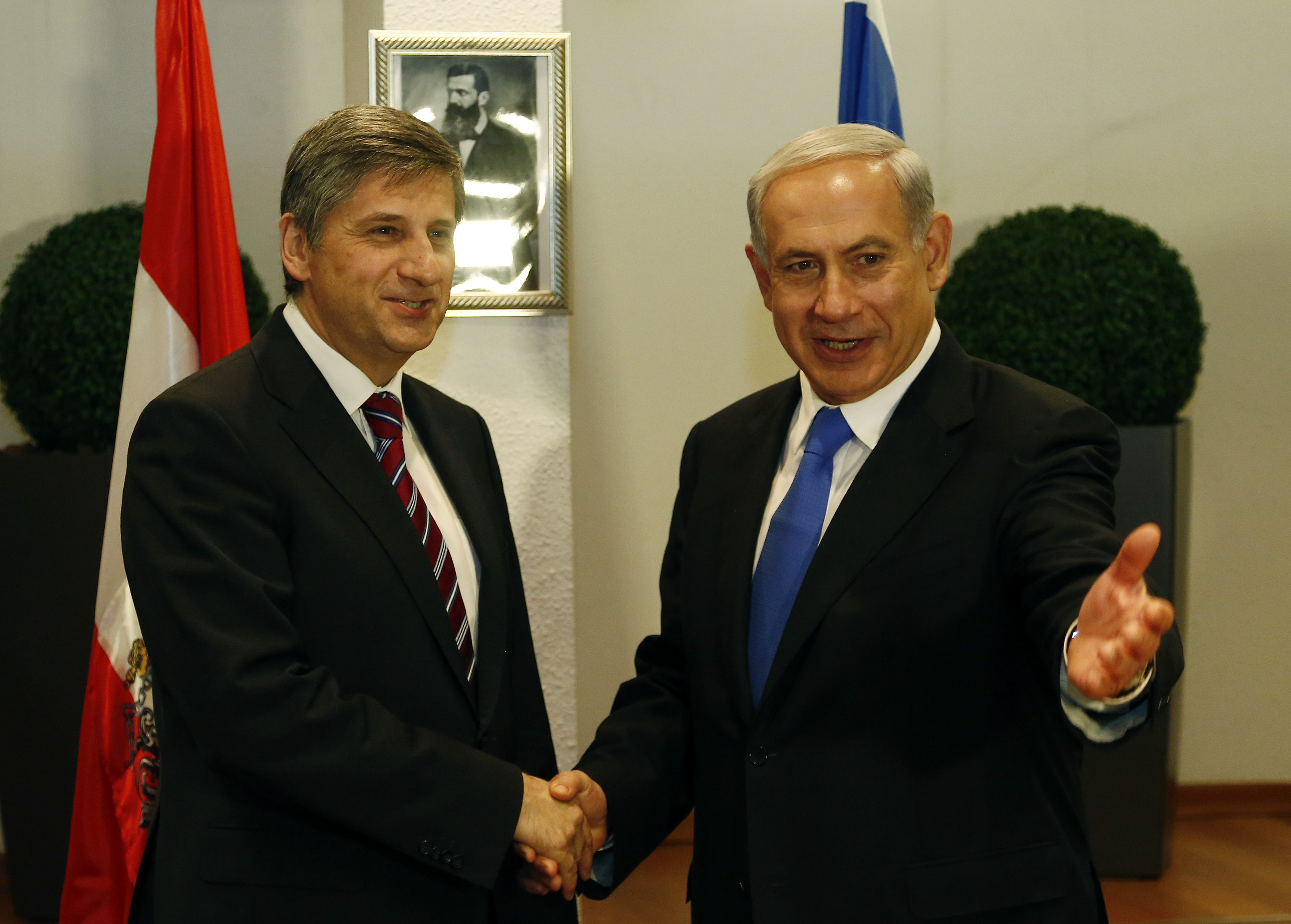
Spindelegger with Israeli prime minister Benyamin Netanyahu, 11 April 2013

By 2013, the pace of withdrawing Austrian peacekeeping troops after 39 years of monitoring duty on the Golan Heights (as part of the United Nations Disengagement Observer Force) exposed splits between the Social Democrat-led defense ministry and the conservative-led foreign ministry ahead of the national elections that year.

=== Finance Minister of Austria, 2013–2014 ===
Following the 2013 national elections, Spindelegger became Austria's finance minister in Faymann's second cabinet. He replaced Maria Fekter.

Under Spindelegger's leadership, Austria decided against letting state lender Hypo Alpe Adria go bust; instead, the government created a "bad bank" for 18 billion euros ($25 billion) of Hypo assets while pressing its home province of Carinthia and holders of subordinated debt to contribute to the costs.

In July 2014, Spindelegger announced that his fellow conservative Johannes Hahn would remain Austria's Member of the European Commission under President Jean-Claude Juncker. Prior to the announcement, there had been rumours that Spindelegger himself would move to the European Commission.

Spindelegger resigned at the end of August 2014 following disputes over tax reform. The Social Democrats and some within his party called for a new tax on wealth which he opposed saying that the focus should be on cutting national debt levels that were scheduled to reach 80% of GDP by the end of the year. He said: "The Austrian way must be oriented toward Berlin and not toward Athens." Economic Minister Reinhold Mitterlehner was chosen as the new head of the party. Chancellor Werner Faymann said he expected the governing coalition to see out its term.

== Since 2015 ==
In 2015, Spindelegger became the director of the Agency for the Modernisation of Ukraine (AMU).

Since 2016, he has been serving as Director General of the Vienna-based International Centre for Migration Policy Development (ICMPD). This organisation was caught in a scandal where journalists found out that one of the ways the it helps to shape EU migration policy is through its support of the coast guards in Libya, Morocco, and Tunisia - all entities accused of human rights violations and presumably responsible for thousands of illegal pullbacks in the Mediterranean.

In February 2020, Spindelegger joined around fifty former European prime ministers and foreign ministers in signing an open letter published by British newspaper The Guardian to condemn U.S. president Donald Trump’s Middle East peace plan, saying it would create an apartheid-like situation in occupied Palestinian territory.

== Recognition ==
- Grand Decoration of Honour in Silver with Star for Services to the Republic of Austria (Großes Silbernes Ehrenzeichen mit dem Stern für Verdienste um die Republik Österreich) in May 2004. and (2011)

== Notes and references ==
Political offices
Preceded by Ursula Plassnik	Minister of Foreign Affairs; 2008–2013	Succeeded by Sebastian Kurz
Preceded by Josef Pröll	Vice Chancellor of Austria; 2011–2014	Succeeded by Reinhold Mitterlehner
Preceded by Maria Fekter	Minister of Finance; 2013–2014	Succeeded by Hans Jörg Schelling
Party political offices
Preceded by Josef Pröll	Chair of the Austrian People's Party; 2011–2014	Succeeded by Reinhold Mitterlehner
