= Proll =

Proll may refer to:

- Thorwald Proll (born 1941), German writer, short-time member of the Red Army Fraction, brother of Astrid
- Astrid Proll (born 1947), member of the Red Army Fraction, sister of Thorwald
- Nina Proll (born 1974), Austrian actress

== See also ==
Pröll, people with that surname
