= Josef Pröll =

Austrian politician (born 1968)

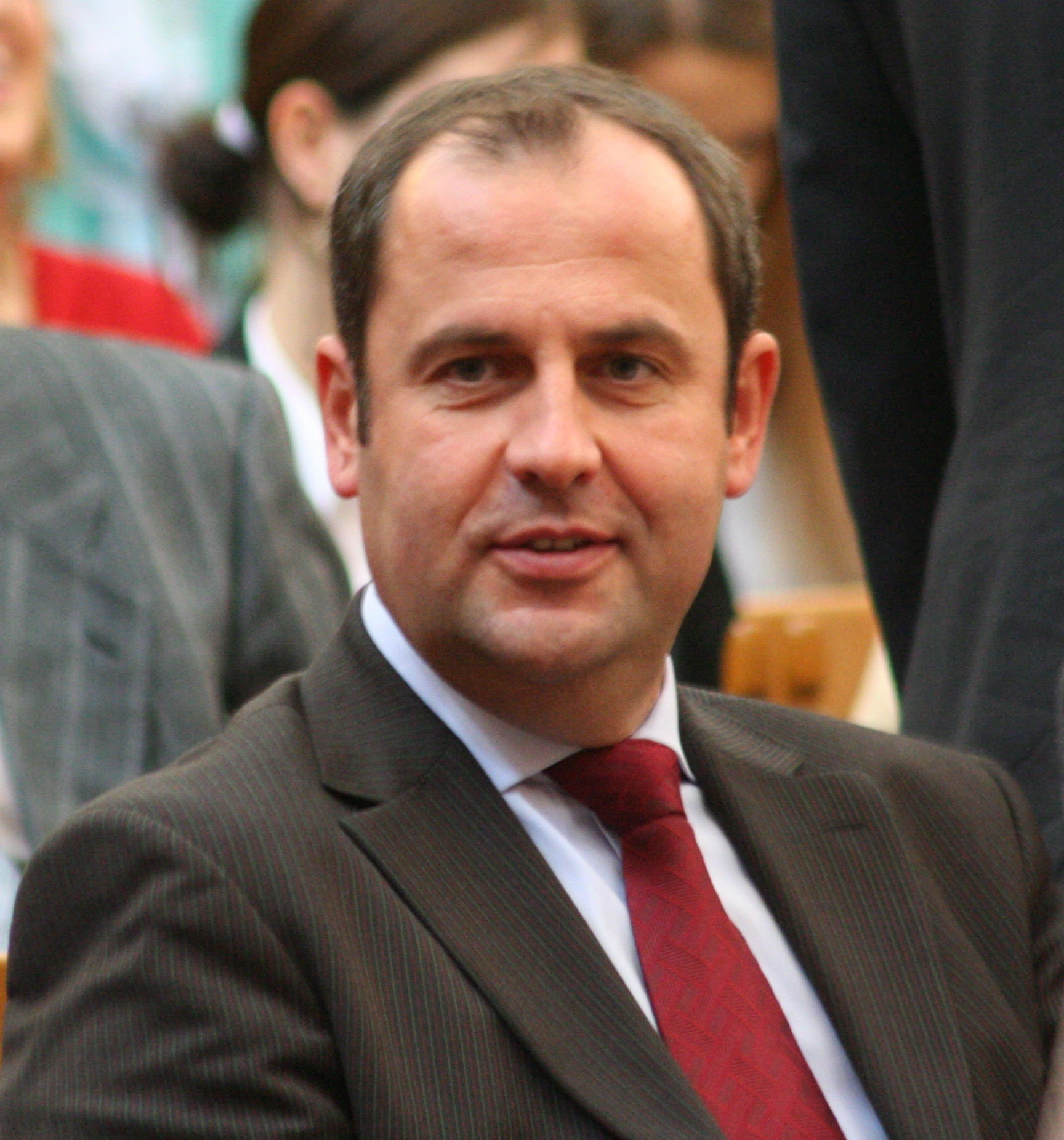

Vice-Chancellor of Austria
- In office 2 December 2008 – 21 April 2011
- Chancellor: Werner Faymann
- Preceded by: Wilhelm Molterer
- Succeeded by: Michael Spindelegger

Minister of Finance
- In office 2 December 2008 – 21 April 2011
- Chancellor: Werner Faymann
- Preceded by: Wilhelm Molterer
- Succeeded by: Maria Fekter

Minister of Agriculture
- In office 28 February 2003 – 2 December 2008
- Chancellor: Wolfgang Schüssel; Alfred Gusenbauer
- Preceded by: Wilhelm Molterer
- Succeeded by: Nikolaus Berlakovich

Personal details
- Born: 14 September 1968 (age 56); Stockerau, Austria
- Political party: Austrian People's
- Children: Alexander Pröll

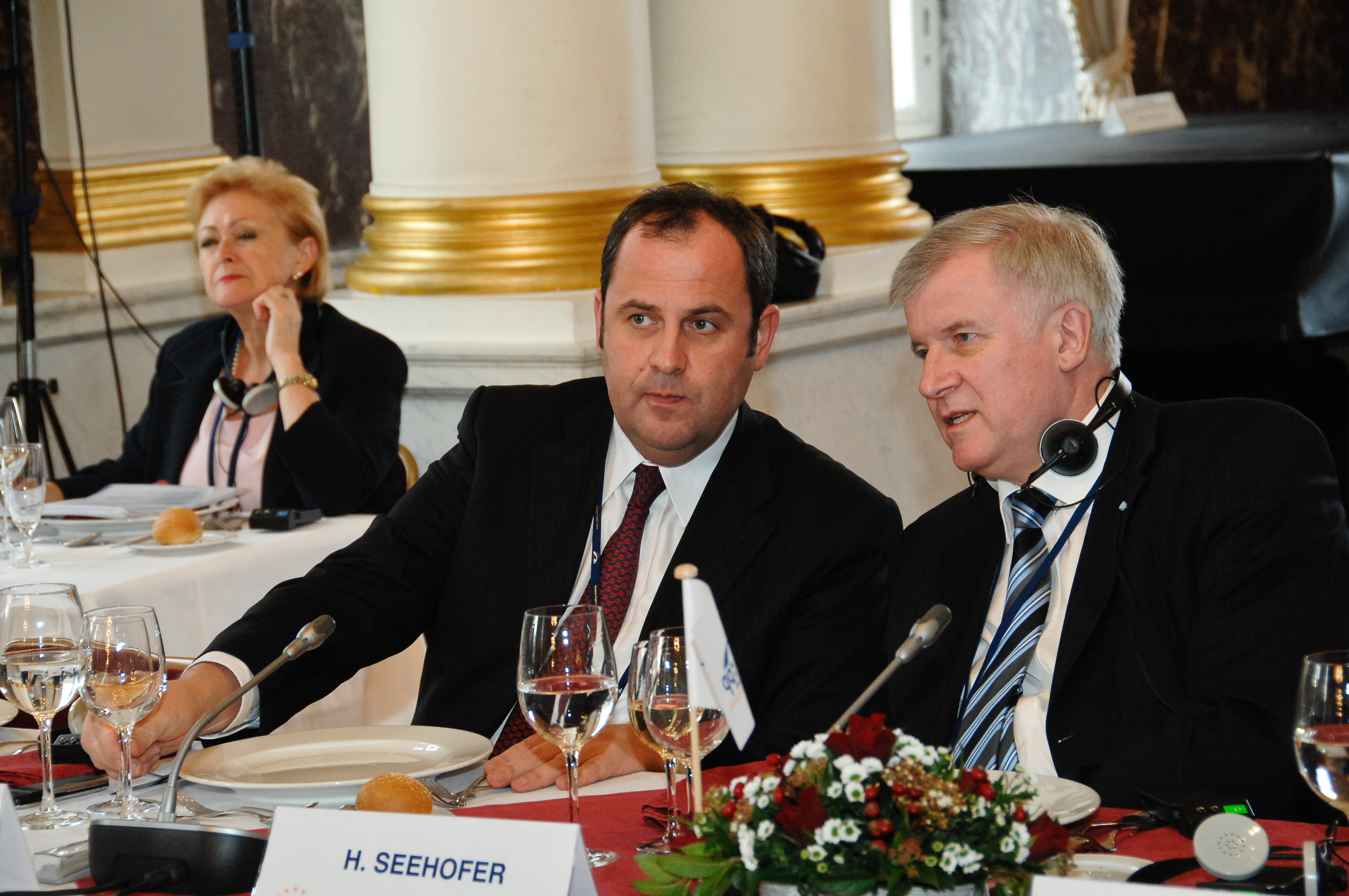
Josef Pröll and Minister President of Bavaria Horst Seehofer at the 2008 EPP summit

Josef Pröll (German pronunciation: [ˈjoːzɛf ˈpʁœl]; born 14 September 1968, in Stockerau, Austria) is an Austrian former politician who was the chairman of the Austrian People's Party from 2008 until 2011. He was Vice Chancellor and Minister of Finance.

Previously, he was the Federal Minister of Agriculture, Forestry, Environment, and Water Management. He was also in charge of rethinking the party's positions and developing a more liberal socio-economic stance. On 28 November 2008, he was elected as the new federal party chairman by 89.6% of delegates at a party conference in Wels.

After two thromboses he suffered a pulmonary embolism in March 2011. A few weeks later, on 13 April, he resigned from all political functions. His successor was the Foreign Minister, Michael Spindelegger.

He is the nephew of Erwin Pröll and the father of Alexander Pröll.

Political offices
Preceded by Wilhelm Molterer	Minister of Agriculture; 2003 – 2008	Succeeded by Nikolaus Berlakovich
Preceded by Wilhelm Molterer	Vice-Chancellor of Austria; 2008 – 2011	Succeeded by Michael Spindelegger
Preceded by Wilhelm Molterer	Minister of Finance; 2008 – 2011	Succeeded by Maria Fekter
Party political offices
Preceded by Wilhelm Molterer	Chair of the People's Party; 2008 – 2011	Succeeded by Michael Spindelegger
