= Wilhelm Molterer =

Austrian politician (born 1955)

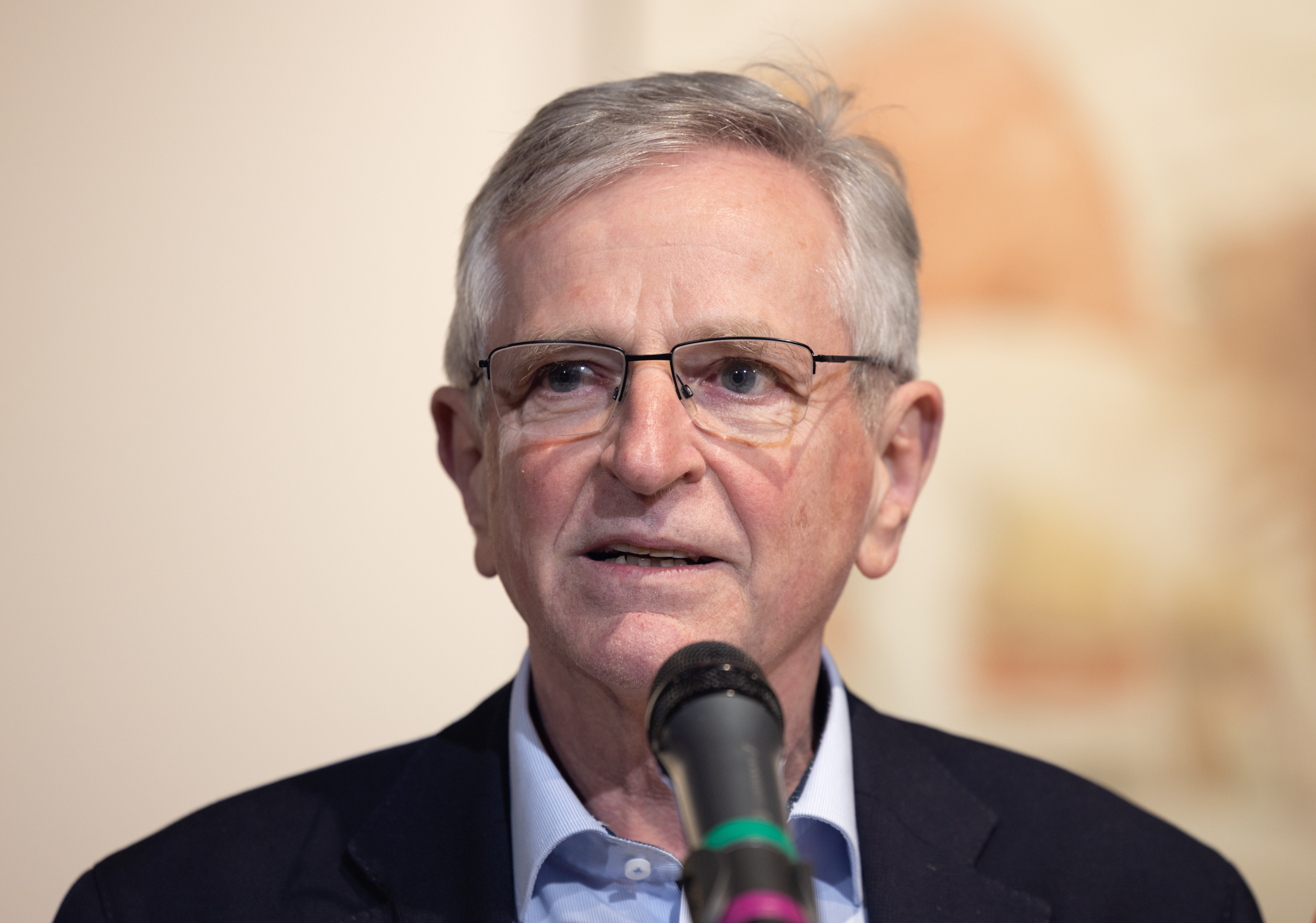
- Molterer in 2023

Vice-Chancellor of Austria
- In office 11 January 2007 – 2 December 2008
- Chancellor: Alfred Gusenbauer
- Preceded by: Hubert Gorbach
- Succeeded by: Josef Pröll

Chair of the People's Party
- In office 21 April 2007 – 28 November 2008
- Preceded by: Wolfgang Schüssel
- Succeeded by: Josef Pröll

Minister of Finance
- In office 11 January 2007 – 2 December 2008
- Chancellor: Alfred Gusenbauer
- Preceded by: Karl-Heinz Grasser
- Succeeded by: Josef Pröll

Minister of Agriculture
- In office 29 November 1994 – 28 February 2003
- Chancellor: Franz Vranitzky; Viktor Klima; Wolfgang Schüssel
- Preceded by: Franz Fischler
- Succeeded by: Josef Pröll

Personal details
- Born: 14 May 1955 (age 71) Steyr, Upper Austria
- Party: People's Party

Wilhelm Molterer (born 14 May 1955) is an Austrian politician, who currently serves as the managing director of the European Fund for Strategic Investments (EFSI). Between 2011 and 2015 he was the vice-president and member of the Management Committee of the European Investment Bank (EIB). Before joining the EIB, he was Member of the Austrian Parliament. He has been Vice Chancellor and Finance Minister of Austria and chairman of the conservative Austrian People's Party.

== Early life and education ==
Molterer's birth name is Kletzmayr. He was born in Steyr, Upper Austria, on 14 May 1955. He grew up in the Upper Austrian town of Sierning, and was raised by his aunt and her husband, Josef Molterer, who adopted him at the age of 14 years. He attended the College of Agriculture in Sankt Florian, graduated in 1974. He received a master's degree in Social Economics from the Johannes Kepler University Linz in 1981.

== Political career ==
While a student Molterer first engaged in politics; he became head of the Österreichische Studentenunion (ÖSU) local branch at his university, and a member of the local students' council. By 1978, when a long-simmering policy conflict within the Austrian ÖSU developed towards a split in the party, Molterer supported liberal positions which sometimes were quite grossly at odds with the more conservative mainstream opinion of the ÖSU's main sponsor, the Austrian People's Party. Several Austrian journalists, consulters, entrepreneurs, academicians and finance people who enjoy national and international reputation today (for instance, Peter Adler, Helmut Brandstätter, Gerald Bast, Hermann Mucke and Wolfgang Pilarz) were Molterer's immediate peers in the ÖSU national executive board at this time. In 1980, he obtained his master's degree.

From 1981 to 1984, Molterer was active in the Austrian Farmers' Association. Starting in 1987, he worked in the Ministry of Agriculture, under the ministers Josef Riegler and Franz Fischler.

=== Member of Parliament, 1990–2011 ===
Molterer served as Minister of Agriculture in the government of Chancellor Franz Vranitzky from 1994 until 2003.

In 2003, Molterer became the chairman of the party's parliamentary club. Just like any other leading politician in Austria at any time, he found it hard to resist the opportunity to politically intervene in the workings of the state-owned national television agency, the ORF. In Molterer's case his critics coined the term Moltofon as a catchphrase for the particularly frequent phone calls the agency reportedly received from his party office.

On 9 January 2007, Molterer was chosen to become managing chairman of the party. He was formally elected chairman of the party at the federal party convention on 21 April 2007. By terminating his party's participation in the Grand Coalition with the SPÖ, he precipitated the early re-elections held on 28 September 2008, which ended in the worst result for the ÖVP (and the SPÖ) since their respective inception after World War II. Wilhelm Molterer stepped down as chairman of the party on 29 September 2008 and was succeeded by Josef Pröll.

=== Minister of Finance, 2007–2008 ===
During his time in office, Molterer unsuccessfully opposed a 2007 deal between the Austrian government and the Eurofighter consortium on reducing an order of Eurofighter Typhoon military jets from 18 to 15 and to shift to a slightly less advanced model.

== Other activities ==
- African Development Bank (AfDB), Ex-Officio Member of the Board of Governors (2007-2008)
- European Investment Bank (EIB), Ex-Officio Member of the Board of Governors (2007-2008)

== Controversy ==
In 2013, Vienna prosecutors extended a corruption investigation to include Molterer and Foreign Ministry State Secretary Reinhold Lopatka on suspicion their ÖVP may have used Telekom Austria funds for illegal party financing in the 2008 election.

Political offices
Preceded by Franz Fischler	Minister of Agriculture; 1994 – 2003	Succeeded by Josef Pröll
Preceded by Hubert Gorbach	Vice-Chancellor of Austria; 2007 – 2008	Succeeded by Josef Pröll
Preceded by Karl-Heinz Grasser	Finance Minister of Austria; 2007 – 2008	Succeeded by Josef Pröll
Party political offices
Preceded by Wolfgang Schüssel	Chair of the Austrian People's Party; 2007 – 2008	Succeeded by Josef Pröll
