= Alexander Pröll =

Austrian politician (born 1990)

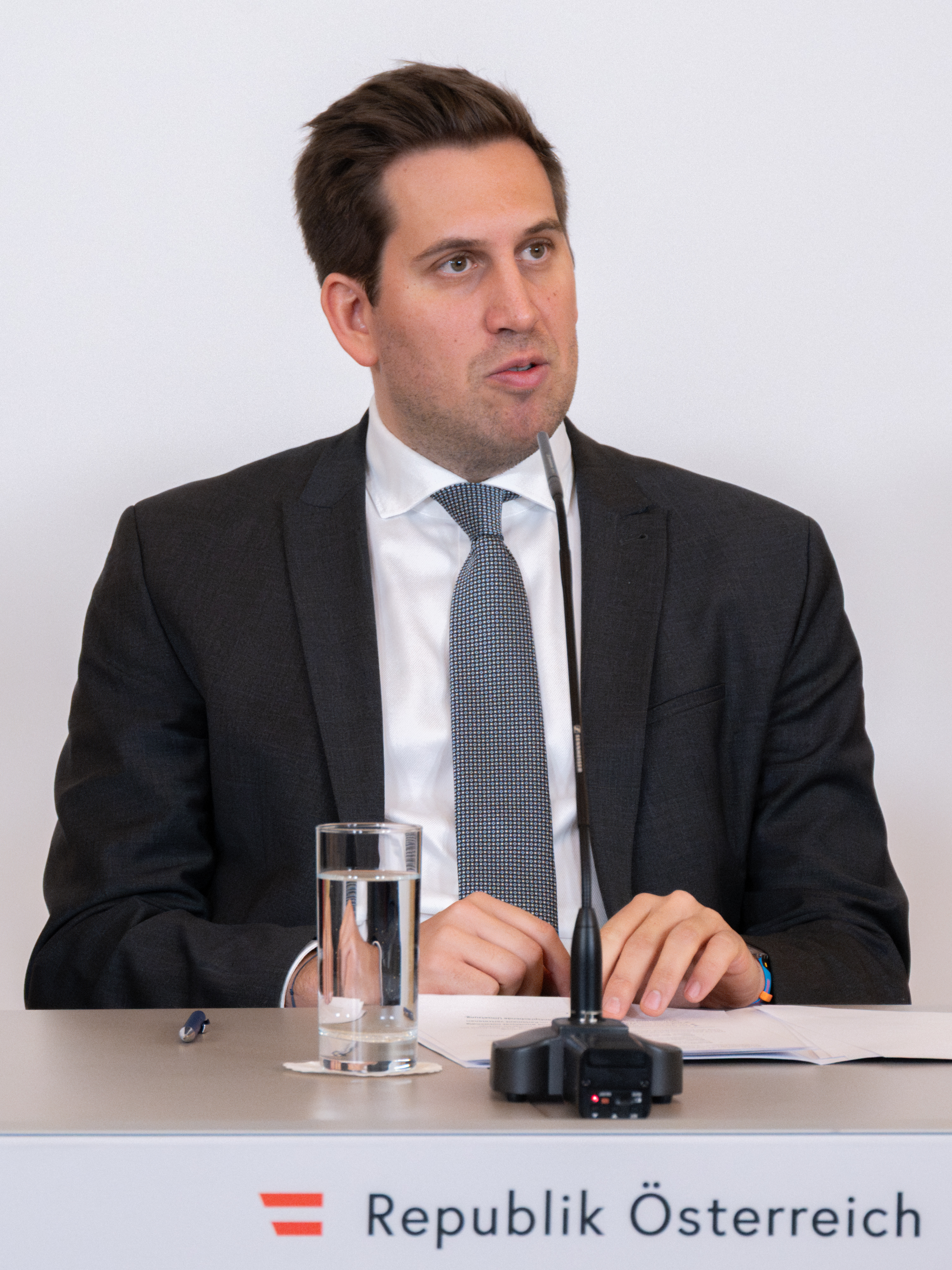
- Pröll in 2026

Secretary General of the Austrian People's Party
- Incumbent
- Assumed office 5 January 2025
- Preceded by: Christian Stocker
- Acting
- In office 10 September 2022 – 23 September 2022
- Preceded by: Laura Sachslehner
- Succeeded by: Christian Stocker

Personal details
- Born: 24 May 1990 (age 36)
- Party: People's
- Parent: Josef Pröll (father)
- Relatives: Erwin Pröll (great-uncle)
- Education: Vienna University of Economics and Business

Alexander Pröll (born 24 May 1990) is an Austrian politician serving as secretary general of the People's Party since 2025. From 2022 to 2025, he served as federal managing director of the party.

== Early life and career ==
Pröll is the son of Josef Pröll, and the great-nephew of Erwin Pröll. In 2015, he opened the Jägerball alongside his girlfriend. He graduated from the Vienna University of Economics and Business with a master's degree in economic law. From 2018 to 2019, he served as chief of staff to People's Party secretary general Karl Nehammer. He began working for federal chancellor Sebastian Kurz in 2020, and later worked for Kurz's successors Alexander Schallenberg and Karl Nehammer.

In December 2021, Pröll was appointed federal managing director of the People's Party. He took office in January 2022 and was responsible for the party's internal organisation. In September 2022, he became the interim secretary general of the party following the resignation of Laura Sachslehner. He retained his position as federal managing director following the appointment of Christian Stocker as secretary general. Since 2023, he has been a board member of FK Austria Wien. In the 2024 legislative election, he was a candidate for member of the National Council in 19th position on the federal party list.
