= Chamber for Workers and Employees =

Organization based in Vienna, Austria

Logo of Chamber for Workers and Employees

The Chamber of Labour (German: Kammer für Arbeiter und Angestellte, shortform Arbeiterkammer or AK), is an organisation that represents the interests of 4 million Austrian employees and consumers. Membership is compulsory for all employees working in Austria, and it is thus not to be confused with Austrian labour unions, where membership is voluntary and which are organized in an umbrella organisation, the ÖGB. Together, the ÖGB and the Arbeiterkammer represent the interests of employees in the Austrian system of Sozialpartnerschaft ("Social Partnership"), which plays a major role in the regulation of wages and prices.

The Austrian Chamber of Labour is based on the nine Chambers of labour for each federal state in Austria. The president of the Chamber of Labour for Vienna is also the president of the Austrian Chamber of Labour. Since 27 April 2018, Renate Anderl has been President of the Chamber of Labour.

== Key tasks and resources ==
The tasks of the AK are described in § 1 AKG: "The Chambers of Labour and the Federal Chamber of Labour are called upon to represent and promote the social, economic, professional and cultural interests of employees." The AK carefully examine new legislation to ensure that workers are not taken advantage of. The Chamber also consult individuals with issues related to their jobs, apprenticeships, or public employment service (AMS).

§ 4 lists the means of fulfilling the legal mandate: for example, statements in legislative procedures, delegation of representatives to corporate bodies and other organisations, conducting scientific studies, advising and representing members.

Another area of responsibility of the AK is consumer protection. As the education of employees is an important concern of the Chamber, it operates numerous publicly accessible libraries. The largest of these is the Social Science Study Library of the Chamber of Labour in Vienna. The Chamber of Labour also compiles the Working Climate Index (Arbeitsklima Index), an indicator for job and income satisfaction which was established in 1997.

== Funding ==
All members must pay a membership contribution of 0.5 percent of their gross salary, which is deducted from their wages/salary as part of the social security contribution and transferred to the Chambers of Labour. As a result, the AK is financed "silently" and is hardly noticed by the members.

== Elections ==
Every five years, the federal states hold direct elections to choose a plenary assembly representative for each federal state. The nine elected plenary assemblies in turn elect nine provincial AK presidents. In the election, so-called parliamentary groups can be elected, the largest of which are affiliated with one of the major Austrian parties. Since the election in 1949, the FSG (Fraktion Sozialdemokratischer GewerkschafterInnen, affiliated with the SPÖ) has always won with an absolute majority.

== History ==
The Chamber of Labour was founded in 1920 after the collapse of the Austrian-Hungarian monarchy. During 1934 and 1938 the Chamber of Labour were integrated into the fascist unitary trade union centres. In 1938 they were liquidated by the National Socialists. After the war, the government passed the law on the re-establishment of the Chambers of Labour on 20 July 1945.

Following increasing criticism of compulsory membership and tax-like financing the Chambers of Labour (AK) conducted a member survey in 1996. The question was: "Are you in favour of the Chamber for Workers and Salaried Employees remaining the legal representation of the interests of all employees?" It was answered in the affirmative by a clear majority.
