= Alfred Gusenbauer =

Austrian politician (born 1960)

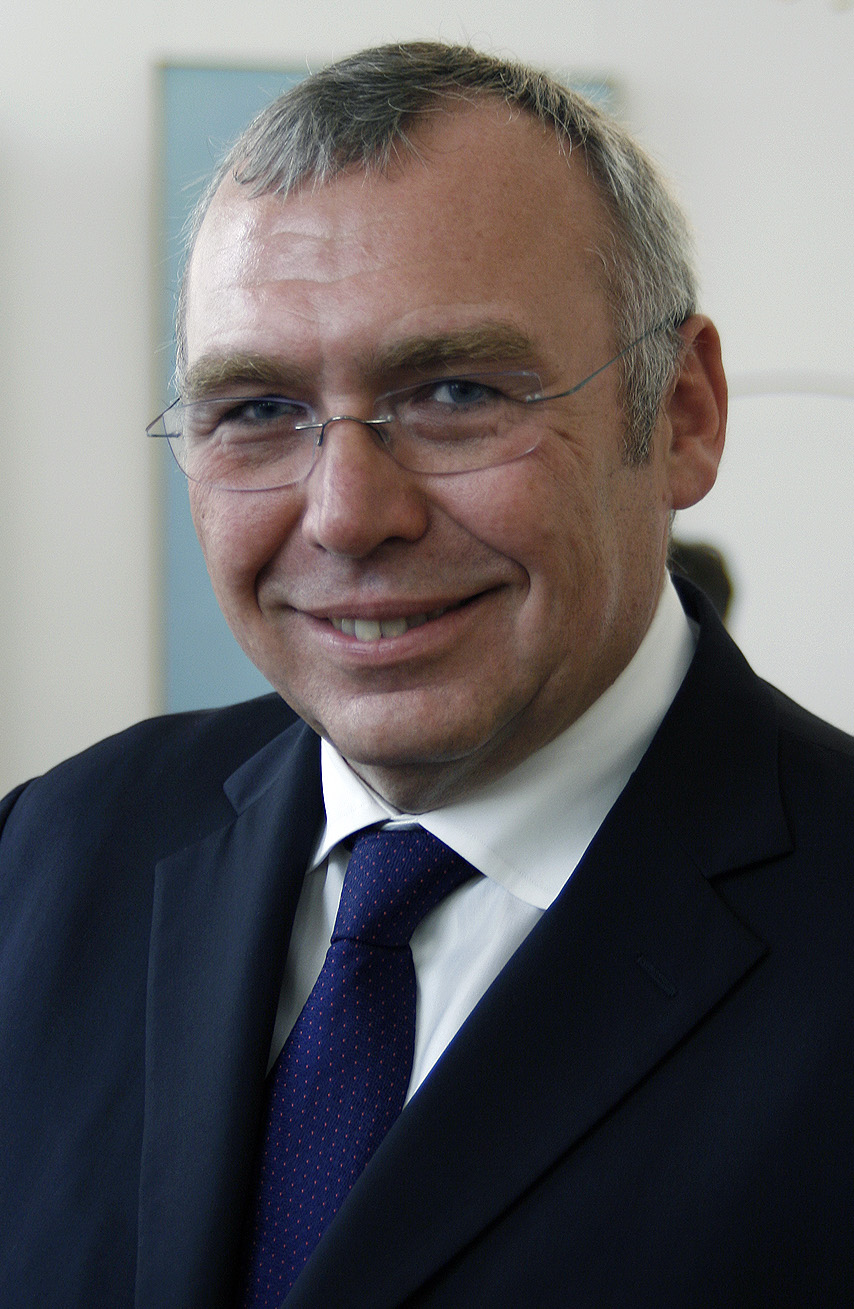
- Gusenbauer in 2008

Chancellor of Austria
- In office 11 January 2007 – 2 December 2008
- President: Heinz Fischer
- Vice-Chancellor: Wilhelm Molterer
- Preceded by: Wolfgang Schüssel
- Succeeded by: Werner Faymann

Chair of the Social Democratic Party
- In office 28 April 2000 – 8 August 2008
- Preceded by: Viktor Klima
- Succeeded by: Werner Faymann

Member of the National Council
- In office 30 October 2006 – 15 January 2007
- Succeeded by: Gabriele Binder-Maier
- Constituency: 3C – Mostviertel
- In office 29 January 1993 – 29 October 2006
- Constituency: 3 – Lower Austria

Member of the Federal Council
- In office 21 February 1991 – 28 January 1993
- Constituency: 3 – Lower Austria

Personal details
- Born: 8 February 1960 (age 66) Sankt Pölten, Austria
- Party: Social Democratic Party
- Education: University of Vienna

Alfred Gusenbauer (Austrian German pronunciation: [ˈalfreːd ˈɡuːzn̩ˌbaʊɐ]; born 8 February 1960) is an Austrian politician who until 2008 spent his entire professional life as an employee of the Social Democratic Party of Austria (SPÖ) or as a parliamentary representative. He headed the SPÖ from 2000 to 2008, and served as Chancellor of Austria from January 2007 to December 2008. Since then, he has pursued a career as a consultant and lecturer, and as a member of supervisory boards of Austrian companies.

== Early life and education ==
Gusenbauer was born in Sankt Pölten in the state of Lower Austria on 8 February 1960. He was educated at a high school in Wieselburg and studied political science, philosophy and jurisprudence at the University of Vienna, where he obtained a doctorate in political science in 1987. Gusenbauer was federal leader of the Socialist Youth Austria (SJÖ) from 1984 to 1990; vice-president of the International Union of Socialist Youth (IUSY) from 1985 to 1989 and vice-president of the Socialist International in 1989. He was then made a senior research fellow in the economic policy department of the Lower Austria section of the Chamber of Labour from 1990 to 1999.

== Chairman of the Social Democratic Party ==
In 1991, Gusenbauer was elected SPÖ chairman in Ybbs an der Donau and a member of the Lower Austria party executive following the resignation of SPÖ chairman Viktor Klima. In the same year he was elected to the Bundesrat (the upper house of the Austrian Parliament) as a deputy for Lower Austria. He was a member of the Austrian delegation to the parliamentary meeting of the Council of Europe in 1991 and was chairman of the social committee of the Council of Europe from 1995 to 1998.

In the Bundesrat, Gusenbauer was chairman of the Committee for Development Co-operation from 1996 to 1999. In 2000, he was elected leader of the SPÖ Group in the Bundesrat and also as secretary-general of the SPÖ. Under his leadership in the 2002 elections the SPÖ improved its vote and gained four seats, but failed to defeat the Austrian People's Party (ÖVP) government of Chancellor Wolfgang Schüssel. Gusenbauer had campaigned on a platform of more social spending and certain tax cuts.

During 2006, the SPÖ was handicapped by its involvement in the "BAWAG scandal" in which directors of the BAWAG, an Austrian bank owned by the Austrian Trade Union Federation (Österreichischer Gewerkschaftsbund, ÖGB), were accused of corruption, embezzlement and illicit speculation. The scandal led in March to the resignation of ÖGB head Fritz Verzetnitsch. The SPÖ as a party was not involved in the fraud but Gusenbauer found it politically expedient to exclude ÖGB leaders from the lists of SPÖ candidates, drawing criticism from the ÖGB.

== Chancellor of Austria ==
After the 2006 elections, the SPÖ was the largest single party but had no absolute majority of the parliamentary seats. A grand coalition between the ÖVP and the SPÖ was considered the most likely outcome. After prolonged negotiations, Gusenbauer became chancellor on 11 January 2007 at the head of the Gusenbauer government, an SPÖ-ÖVP coalition.

In July 2007, Gusenbauer led the Austrian delegation to the 119th session of the International Olympic Committee in Guatemala City to present the proposal for Salzburg as host of the 2014 Winter Olympics; the proposal eventually lost against Sochi, whose bid was presented by President Vladimir V. Putin of Russia.

Gusenbauer immediately drew criticism because he abandoned central promises of the SPÖ election campaign, such as those to abolish university tuition fees (it was decided by the SPÖ instead that students should do community service for 60 hours, which resulted in student protests) and to reverse the country's Eurofighter deal. This provoked public criticism even from SPÖ members. Infighting over Gusenbauer's ability to lead his party never subsided from this point onwards. On 16 June 2008, Gusenbauer was replaced as SPÖ chief by his minister of transport Werner Faymann. However, he formally remained chancellor until after the 2008 snap elections that were called in early July 2008 when the Austrian People's Party (ÖVP), led by Wilhelm Molterer, left the governing coalition. His time in office was the shortest since World War II.

== Post-politics career ==
Gusenbauer briefly returned to his old post in the Chamber of Labour but immediately took on paid and unpaid positions in the private and non-profit sectors.

In 2009, Faymann prevented Gusenbauer's candidacy for the office of High Representative of the Union for Foreign Affairs and Security Policy by agreeing to the nomination of Johannes Hahn from his centre-right junior coalition partner ÖVP as Austria's Member of the European Commission.

=== Corporate boards ===
Gusenbauer was made a member of the supervisory board of Alpine Holding, an Austrian construction conglomerate, in July 2009 and resigned from this position effective 1 May 2010, when it was announced that Gusenbauer was to head the supervisory board of Strabag (Austria's leading construction company) on 18 June 2010. At the same time he was to become chairman of the board of trustees of the private foundation established by Strabag's chairman, Hans Peter Haselsteiner.

In an article about Western leaders working for authoritarian regimes, Associated Press reported that Gusenbauer works as a consultant to Kazakh president Nursultan Nazarbayev. In September 2013, he became an advisor to Serbian deputy prime minister and leader of the Serbian Progressive Party Aleksandar Vučić. In 2018, reports surfaced claiming that Gusenbauer had met with members of Congress in Washington as part of a 2013 lobbying campaign orchestrated by Paul Manafort on behalf of Ukrainian president Viktor Yanukovych.

Other positions include:

- Citigroup, member of the European Advisory Board
- CUDOS Capital AG, chairman of the supervisory board
- Equitas Capital, member of the board and chairman of European Funds (since 2009)
- Gabriel Resources, member of the board of directors (Member of the Corporate Governance and Compensation Committee)
- Haselsteiner Familien-Privatstiftung, chairman
- RHI AG, member of the supervisory board (since 2013)
- Wartenfels Privatstiftung, chairman of the board
- Gusenbauer is active in several business areas at Signa Holding, which was founded by Austrian real estate investor René Benko: On September 17, 2009, he became a member of the Supervisory Board of SIGNA-RECAP Holding AG. As of 2018, he chairs the Supervisory Boards of Signa Development Selection, Signa Prime Selection and Signa KidInvest. In December 2023 he started to announce resignations.

=== Non-profit organizations ===
From 2009 to 2011, Gusenbauer was the first Leitner Global Fellow at the Columbia University School of International and Public Affairs in New York.

Other positions include:

- Austrian Society for China Studies (ÖGCF), president of the board of trustees
- Austrian-Spanish Chamber of Commerce, president
- Bonner Akademie für Forschung und Lehre praktischer Politik (BAPP), member of the board of trustees
- Club de Madrid, Member
- Dr. Karl Renner Institute, president
- Verein für Geschichte der ArbeiterInnenbewegung, member of the board of trustees

== Controversy ==
In 1984, Gusenbauer, then leader of Austria's Young Socialists, caused controversy in Austria when he knelt and kissed the still-Communist tarmac at Moscow's Domodedovo airport – in mockery of Pope John Paul II.

=== Paradise Papers ===
In November 2017, an investigation conducted by the International Consortium of Investigative Journalists cited his name in the list of people and organisations named in the Paradise Papers.

=== Manafort indictment ===
The 16 February 2018 indictment of Paul Manafort unsealed on 23 February, as part of the Mueller special counsel investigation, alleges that foreign politicians, referred to only as the "Hapsburg group," hypothesized to be Gusenbauer and Romano Prodi took payments exceeding $2 million from Manafort to promote the case of his client, then-president of Ukraine Viktor Yanukovich; both denied this and said their work was focused to get closer European Union–Ukraine relations.

=== Investigations of his Signa role ===
As of April 2026, the Austrian prosecution for economy and corruption investigates against Gusenbauer and other persons on the suspicion of embezzlement. The damage sum to which Gusenbauer is suspected to have contributed is 10 million Euro.

== See also ==
- Gusenbauer cabinet

Party political offices
Preceded by Viktor Klima	Leader of the Social Democratic Party; 2000–2008	Succeeded by Werner Faymann
Political offices
Preceded by Wolfgang Schüssel	Chancellor of Austria; 2007–2008	Succeeded by Werner Faymann
