= Werner Faymann =

Chancellor of Austria from 2008 to 2016

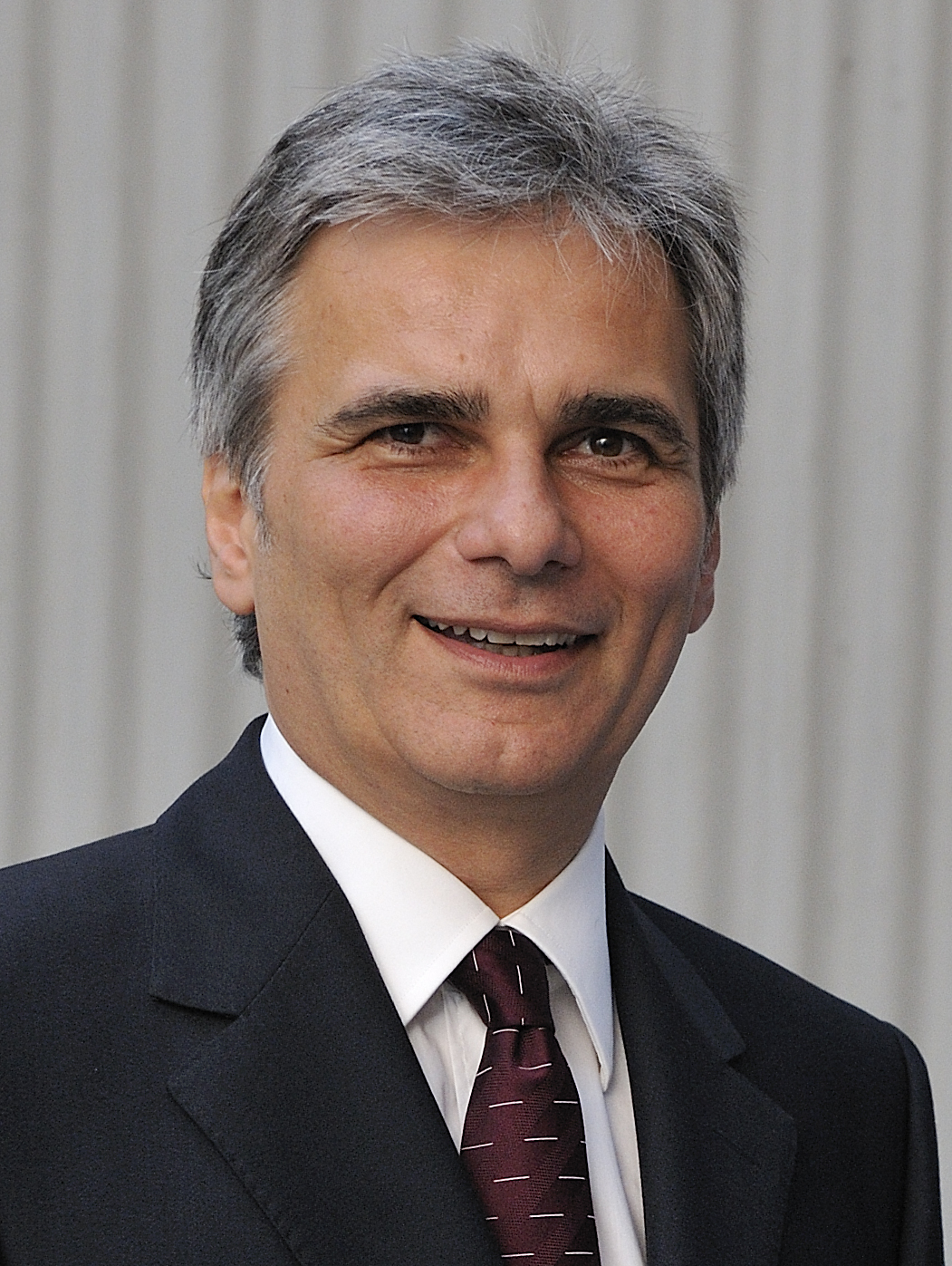
- Faymann in 2015

Chancellor of Austria
- In office 2 December 2008 – 9 May 2016
- President: Heinz Fischer
- Vice-Chancellor: Josef Pröll; Michael Spindelegger; Reinhold Mitterlehner
- Preceded by: Alfred Gusenbauer
- Succeeded by: Christian Kern

Chair of the Social Democratic Party
- In office 8 August 2008 – 9 May 2016
- Preceded by: Alfred Gusenbauer
- Succeeded by: Christian Kern

Minister of Transport, Innovation and Technology
- In office 11 January 2007 – 2 December 2008
- Chancellor: Alfred Gusenbauer
- Preceded by: Hubert Gorbach
- Succeeded by: Doris Bures

Member of the National Council
- In office 29 October 2013 – 16 December 2013
- Nominated by: Himself
- Affiliation: Social Democratic Party
- In office 28 October 2008 – 2 December 2008
- Nominated by: Himself
- Affiliation: Social Democratic Party

Personal details
- Born: 4 May 1960 (age 65) Vienna, Austria
- Political party: Social Democratic Party
- Spouse: Martina Ludwig
- Children: 2

Werner Faymann (German: [ˈvɛʁnɐ ˈfaɪman]; born 4 May 1960) is an Austrian former politician who was Chancellor of Austria and chairman of the Social Democratic Party of Austria (SPÖ) from 2008 to 2016. On 9 May 2016, he resigned from both positions amid widening criticism within his party.

== Early and personal life ==
Werner Faymann was born in Vienna and also attended grammar school there. After graduating from grammar school he enrolled at the University of Vienna (jurisprudence, political science, and history of art).

Faymann is Roman Catholic. He is in his second marriage and has two children.

== Career ==
In 1981, Faymann became provincial chairman of the Socialist Youth Vienna (Sozialistische Jugend Wien). From 1985 to 1988 Faymann was a consultant to the Zentralsparkasse (now part of Bank Austria). The bank at the time was closely linked to the municipal government dominated by the Social Democrats. He left the bank to become director and provincial chairman of the Viennese Tenants' counselling.

Subsequently, Faymann became a member of the Viennese state parliament and municipal council, where he held various positions concerning housing construction and urban renewal.

=== Minister of Transport, 2007–08 ===
Faymann was Minister for Transport, Innovation and Technology in the Cabinet of Chancellor Alfred Gusenbauer. Moreover, Gusenbauer appointed him as coalition co-ordinator.

Soon Faymann was seen as the likely successor of Gusenbauer. He never challenged Gusenbauer openly, but the chancellor faced an internal party rebellion in June 2008 and voluntarily relinquished the party leadership. On 16 June 2008 Faymann succeeded Gusenbauer as chairman of the Social Democratic Party of Austria (SPÖ) and led the party in the snap legislative elections, held on 28 September 2008.

The election was famously preceded by Faymann and Gusenbauer announcing a shift in the party's position towards the signing of new EU treaties, which they did by writing an open letter to Hans Dichand, the editor of the yellow press medium Kronen Zeitung. At the time, the Kronen Zeitung was the largest newspaper in the country. The letter caused a scandal within the party, as no party committee had been involved in deciding the shift.

The pro-EU Austrian People's Party (ÖVP) cancelled the existing coalition, thus causing new elections. Faymann was known for his good relationship to Dichand, who would also support him in the following election campaign. Although the SPÖ lost 11 seats, and had a 6% swing against it (in fact, their worst result since World War II), they came out ahead of their main rivals Austrian People's Party in regard to seats (57 to 51) as well as to share of the vote (29.26% to 25.98%). Afterwards, Faymann renewed the coalition with the Austrian People's Party, as he had announced before the election.

=== Chancellor of Austria, 2008–2016 ===
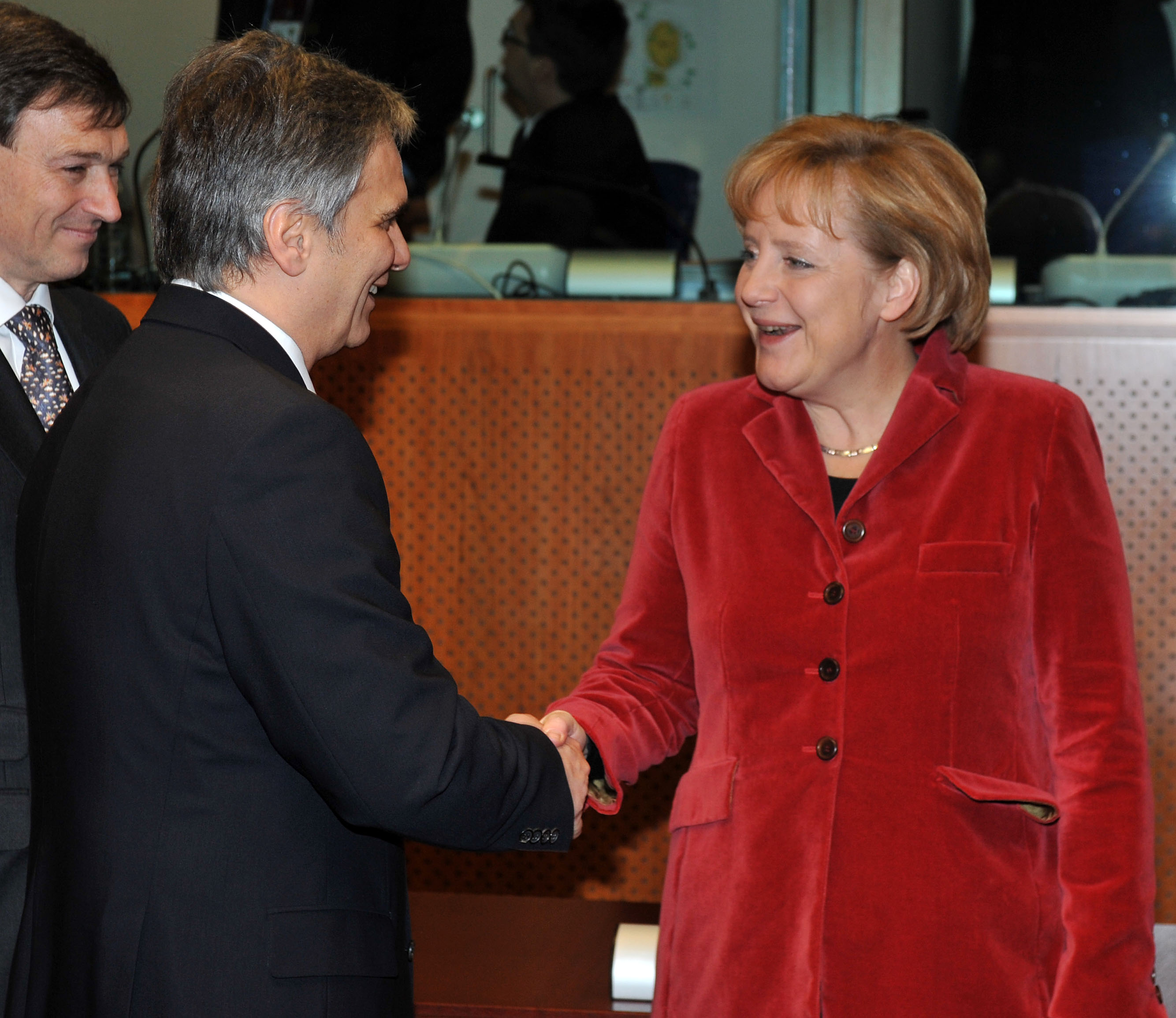
Faymann meets German Chancellor Angela Merkel, 11 December 2008

As head of the largest party in the National Council of Austria, Faymann was asked by Federal President Heinz Fischer on 8 October 2008 to form a new government.

A coalition between the SPÖ and the ÖVP was agreed upon on 23 November 2008 and was sworn in on 2 December 2008.

In 2012, Austria's government curbed the remit of a parliamentary investigation into high-level corruption and ensured Faymann was not called to testify.

In 2013, public prosecutors were looking into whether Faymann and a top aide, Josef Ostermayer, had swayed the ÖBB state railways and ASFiNAG motorway agency to place advertisements promoting him in newspapers during his tenure as infrastructure minister. Both had repeatedly denied any wrongdoing in the breach of trust case, which the opposition Freedom Party (FPÖ) had asked prosecutors to investigate. By November 2013, Austrian authorities dropped their investigation.

On 9 May 2016, Faymann resigned as chancellor and party leader, after losing confidence from a considerable number of party members, despite retaining confidence from a majority of them. His party's candidate and the candidate from its coalition partner, the People's Party, were both historically eliminated in the first round of the presidential elections held on 24 April 2016, resulting in a run-off between Norbert Hofer of the right-wing populist Freedom Party of Austria and Alexander Van der Bellen, an independent endorsed by The Greens. Hofer announced that as president he could dissolve the National Council in order to hold elections, which would at the time probably have led to a win of the populists and thereby forced Faymann to resign.

== Political positions ==
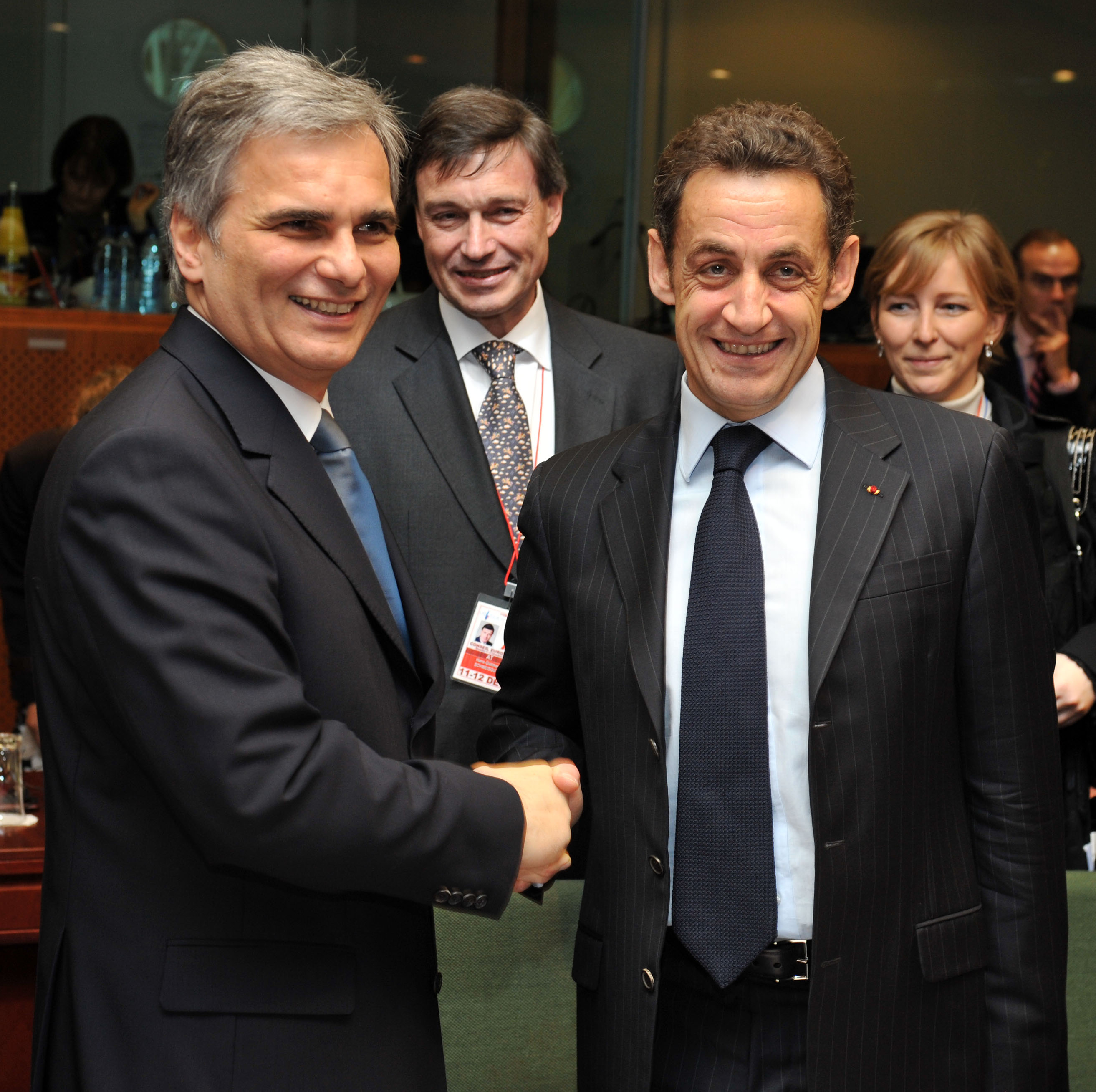
Faymann and French president Nicolas Sarkozy in 2008

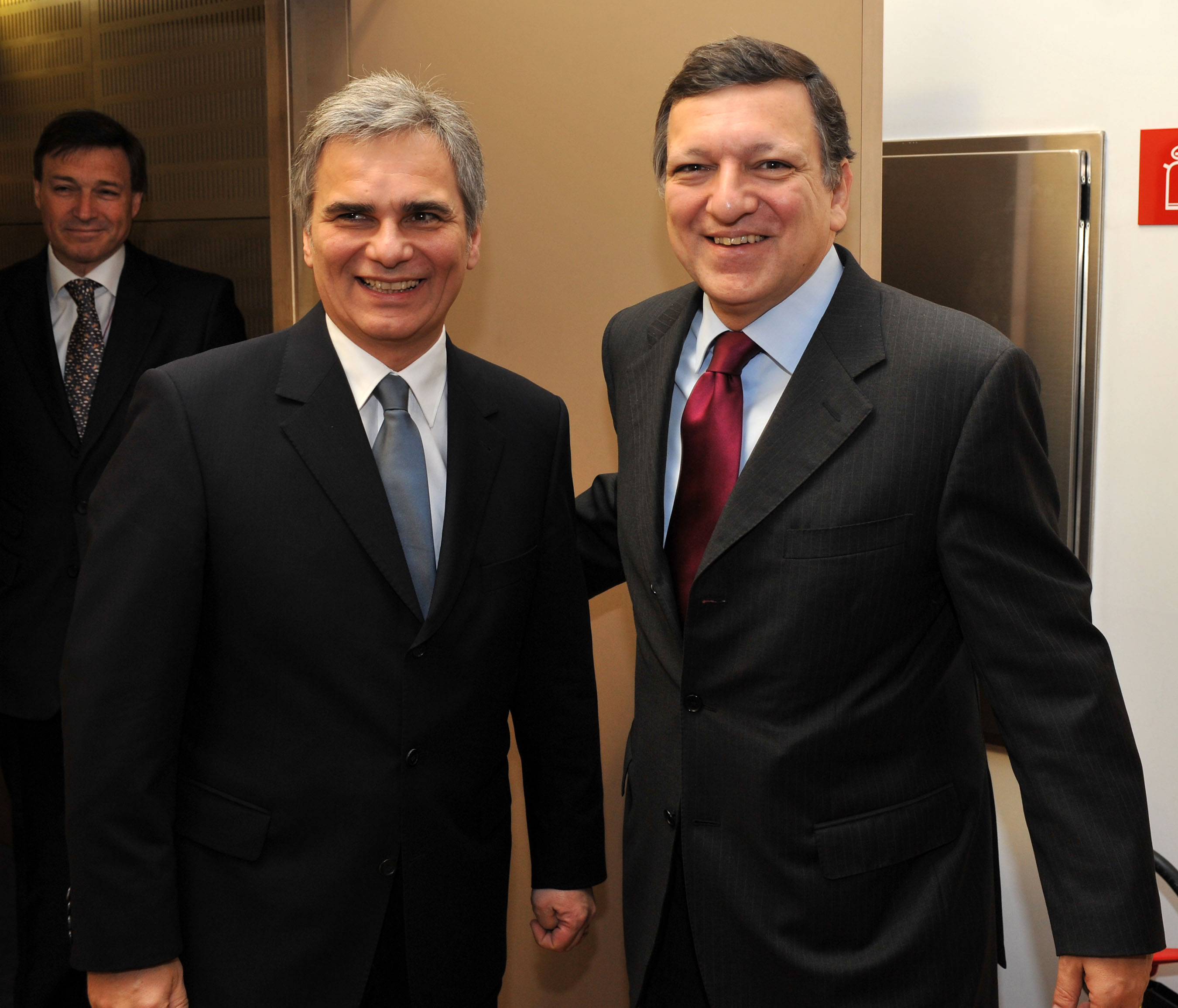
Faymann and president of the European Commission José Manuel Barroso in 2008

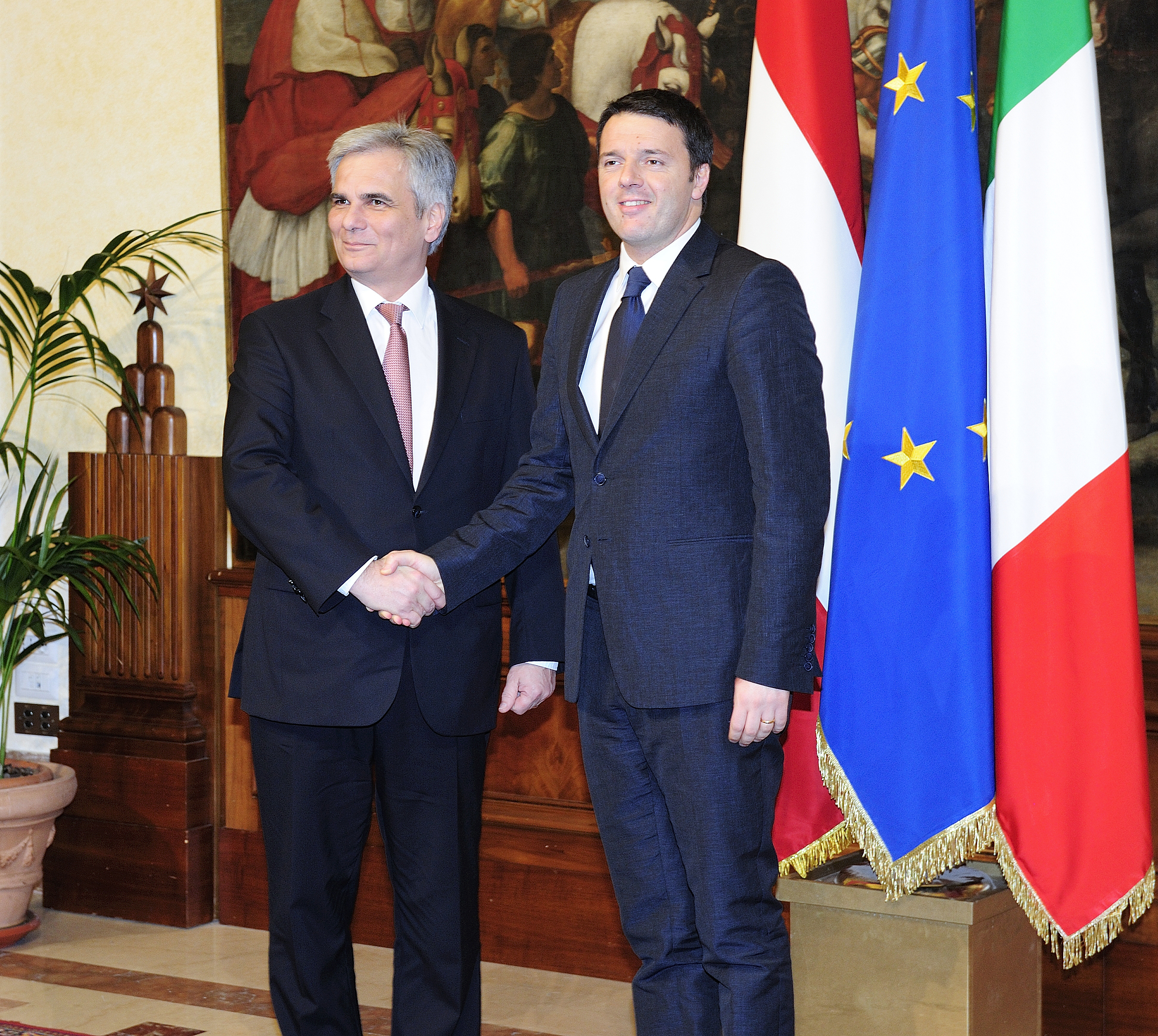
Faymann and Italian prime minister Matteo Renzi in 2014

During his tenure, Faymann is said to have moved his once solidly pro-European party toward a more eurosceptic course, but he kept his distance from the far-right parties. In domestic affairs, Faymann's administration was notable in enacting a wide range of reforms in areas such as education and social security.

Initially, Faymann sided with German Chancellor Angela Merkel in supporting the thousands of refugees fleeing wars in countries such as Syria and seeking asylum in Europe. Austria took in around 90,000 asylum-seekers in 2015, then more than 1 percent of its population. However, support for his policies fell, and the country's institutions struggled to cope with hundreds of thousands of arrivals in Austria, and he later criticized what he called Merkel's "wait-and-see" approach to tackling Europe's economic problems and demanded a more aggressive push to combat unemployment in Europe. Measures to halt immigration inflows along the so-called "Balkan route" subsequently strained relations between the two countries. The reversal angered parts of the Social Democrats but failed to stop Norbert Hofer, a right-wing politician, from taking more than 35 per cent of the vote in the first round of the 2016 presidential election, then the highest vote that the party had ever secured in a national poll.

In a media interview published amid the European migrant crisis in September 2015, Faymann said Hungary's decision to tell refugees that a train they were boarding was bound for the capital Budapest when in fact it was heading to a refugee camp was reminiscent "of the darkest chapter of our continent's history". In response to this comparison with Nazi deportations, Hungary summoned the Austrian ambassador.

== Life after politics ==
In August 2016, UN Secretary-General Ban Ki-moon appointed Faymann as the United Nations' Special Envoy on Youth Unemployment. In this capacity, he works closely with Ahmad Alhendawi, the Secretary-General's Envoy on Youth.

In September 2016, Faymann and his former spokesperson Matthias Euler-Rolle founded their own communications consultancy in Vienna.

== Other activities ==
- Karl Renner Institute, member of the board of trustees
- Hans Kelsen Institute, ex-officio chairman of the board of trustees
- National Fund of the Republic of Austria for Victims of National Socialism, ex-officio member of the board of trustees

== See also ==
- First Faymann government
- Second Faymann government
- Politics of Austria

Party political offices
Preceded by Alfred Gusenbauer	Chair of the Social Democratic Party; 2008–2016	Succeeded by Christian Kern
Political offices
Preceded by Hubert Gorbach	Minister of Transport, Innovation and Technology; 2007–2008	Succeeded by Doris Bures
Preceded by Alfred Gusenbauer	Chancellor of Austria; 2008–2016	Succeeded by Christian Kern
