= Ministry of Finance (Austria) =

Government ministry of Austria

- Bundesministerium für Finanzen

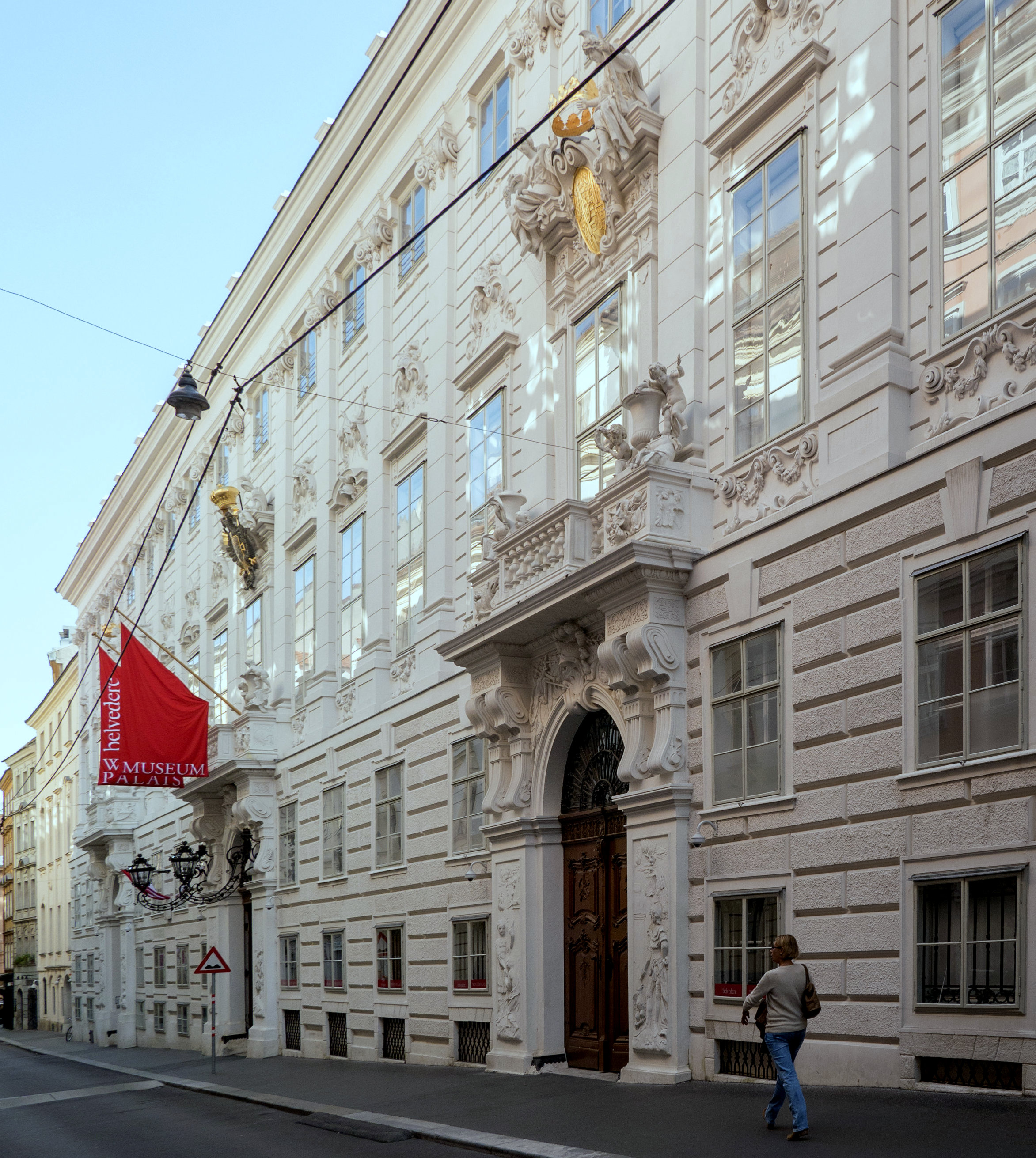
- {{{picture_caption}}}

Ministry overview
- Formed: 1920; 106 years ago
- Preceding Ministry: Imperial and Royal Ministry of Finance
- Jurisdiction: Government of Austria
- Status: Highest federal authority
- Headquarters: Himmelpfortgasse 8 Innere Stadt, Vienna, Austria
- Annual budget: €1,13 billion (2015)
- Minister responsible: Markus Marterbauer (SPÖ)
- Ministry executives: Vacant, State secretary; Thomas Schmid, General secretary
- Website: www.bmf.gv.at

The Ministry of Finance (German: Bundesministerium für Finanzen) is the government ministry of Austria responsible for the collection of taxes and customs as well as the administration of fiscal and economic policy. It oversees the Revenue Service, the Revenue Service for Large Businesses, the Financial Police, and various other agencies.

It is headquartered in the Winter Palace of Prince Eugene, Vienna. The current Minister is Markus Marterbauer.

== Structure and function ==
The Ministry is responsible for revenue administration at the federal level, including the government budget, matters of finance concerning the European Union, taxes, duties and tariffs. It defines and conducts the country's budgetary policy concerning currency, credit, savings banks (Sparkassen) and exchange matters, capital movements and settlement, insurance control and hallmarks. It is also concerned with economic policy, if not discharged by the Ministry of Economy.

The Finance Minister and the General Secretary chair six departments (Sektionen):

- Dept. I: Office of the Minister
- Dept. II: Federal budget
- Dept. III: Economic policy and financial markets
- Dept. IV: Taxes and tariffs
- Dept. V: Information technology
- Dept. VI: Fiscal policy and tax law

== History ==
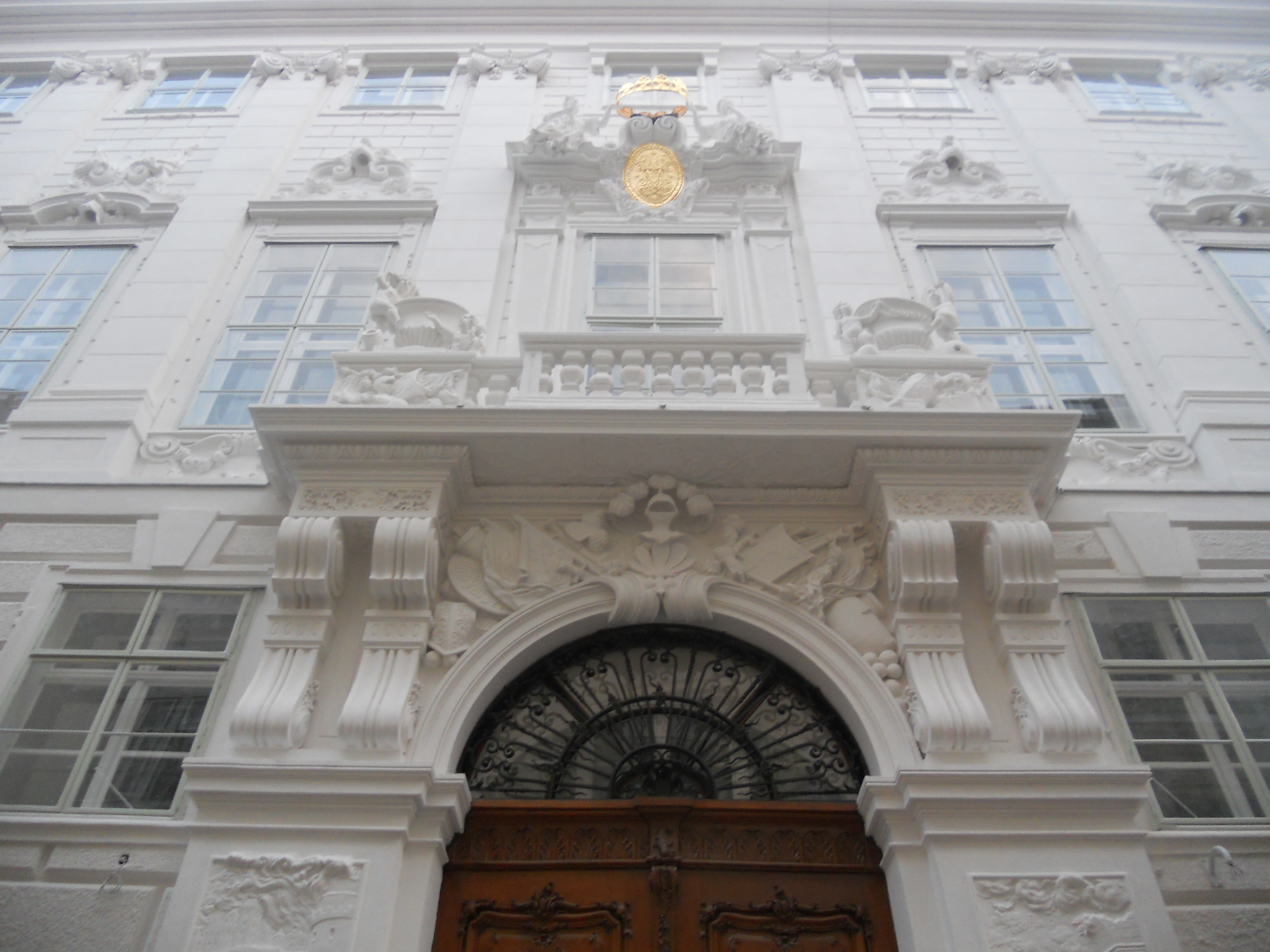
Winter Palace of Prince Eugene in Vienna, seat of the Ministry

A first Hofkammer (court chamber) stewardship for the Austrian lands was established in Vienna by Archduke Ferdinand I, in order to balance the deficient Habsburg budget. Re-established by Maria Theresa in 1760, the chamber became the k.k. Finance Ministry of the Austrian Empire upon the Revolutions of 1848 and took its seat at the former city palace of Prince Eugene.

After the Austro-Hungarian Compromise of 1867, the Austrian Finance Minister was only responsible for the Cisleithanian crown lands, while for the common financial policy of the real union, a separate Austro-Hungarian k.u.k. Finance Ministry was established. After World War I, the First Austrian Republic implemented a Staatsamt für Finanzen, which was renamed upon the adoption of the Austrian Constitution (B-VG) in 1920.

== See also ==
- Thomas Wieser – former Director General for Economic Policy and Financial Markets
