= Fred Sinowatz =

Chancellor of Austria from 1983 to 1986

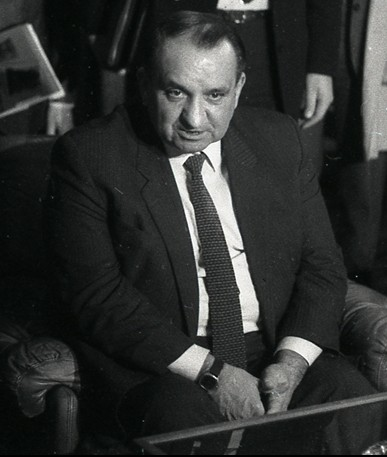

Chancellor of Austria
- In office 24 May 1983 – 16 June 1986
- President: Rudolf Kirchschläger
- Vice-Chancellor: Norbert Steger
- Preceded by: Bruno Kreisky
- Succeeded by: Franz Vranitzky

Vice-Chancellor of Austria
- In office 20 January 1981 – 24 May 1983
- Chancellor: Bruno Kreisky
- Preceded by: Hannes Androsch
- Succeeded by: Norbert Steger

Chair of the Social Democratic Party
- In office 27 October 1983 – 11 May 1988
- Preceded by: Bruno Kreisky
- Succeeded by: Franz Vranitzky

Minister of Education and the Arts
- In office 4 November 1971 – 24 May 1983
- Chancellor: Bruno Kreisky
- Preceded by: Leopold Gratz
- Succeeded by: Helmut Zilk

Member of the National Council
- In office 18 June 1986 – 22 September 1988
- Constituency: Burgenland–Lower Austria–Vienna
- In office 4 November 1971 – 31 May 1983
- Constituency: 1 – Burgenland

Personal details
- Born: 5 February 1929 Neufeld an der Leitha, Burgenland, Austria
- Died: 11 August 2008 (aged 79) Vienna, Austria
- Party: Social Democratic Party
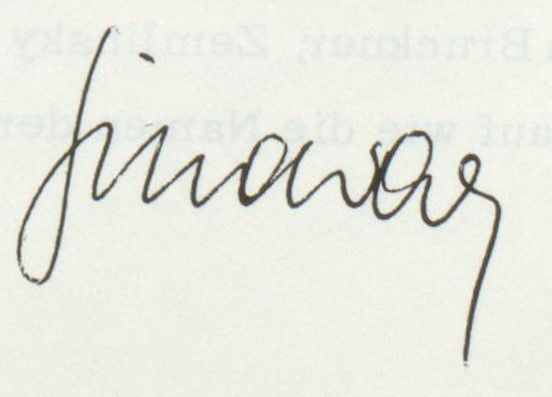
- Signature

Alfred Sinowatz (5 February 1929 – 11 August 2008) was an Austrian historian and politician of the Social Democratic Party (SPÖ), who served as Chancellor of Austria from 1983 to 1986. Prior to becoming Chancellor, he had served as Minister of Education from 1971 to 1983 and Vice-Chancellor from 1981 to 1983.

After a three-years term in office, Sinowatz resigned as Chancellor after Kurt Waldheim's victory in the 1986 presidential election.

== Life and career ==
Born in Neufeld an der Leitha, Burgenland, Sinowatz' family belonged to the local Croatian minority. He attended the gymnasium in Wiener Neustadt and Baden, where he obtained his Matura degree. Educated as a historian at the University of Vienna, he received his doctorate in 1953. He embarked upon a career in the civil service of the Burgenland state government and joined the staff of the provincial archive in 1956.

Sinowatz became an elected member of the municipal assembly (Gemeinderat) of his hometown Neufeld in 1957 and served as a regional SPÖ party secretary from 1961. Also in 1961 he became MP of the Burgenland state diet (Landtag), serving as speaker from 1964 to 1966. In 1966 he joined the provincial government as Minister of Education.

Upon the 1971 legislative election, Sinowatz became a member of the Austrian National Council parliament. On 4 November 1971, he took office as Minister of Education and Arts in the second cabinet of Chancellor Bruno Kreisky. During the ensuing twelve years of his office, Sinowatz substantially reformed the system of education in Austria to allow and increase social mobility. In 1982 he promoted the recognition of Buddhism in Austria as an official religious community.

In 1981, after Bruno Kreisky's aspiring "crown prince", Finance Minister Hannes Androsch was removed from his position, Sinowatz also became Vice-Chancellor.

== Chancellorship ==
The SPÖ had held an absolute majority in the National Council since 1970. However, at the 1983 election, they won 90 seats, two short of a majority. Kreisky resigned as chancellor, and Sinowatz reluctantly succeeded him. He helmed a coalition, still initiated by Kreisky, with the Freedom Party (FPÖ) which was then run by liberals under Vice-Chancellor Norbert Steger. In autumn 1983, Sinowatz also succeeded Kreisky as chairman of the SPÖ.

In late 1984, his red-blue coalition had to face the severe internal crisis of the Occupation of the Hainburger Au by thousands of people protesting against the building of a power station in the Danube floodplain, with violent clashes between police and demonstrators. Sinowatz managed to calm both sides by calling a halt to the woodland clearing and announcing a "Christmas Peace" on 22 December 1984, following considerable pressure from the public.

In spite of this, his period of office generally is not considered to have been successful. It was overshadowed by the 1985 diethylene glycol wine scandal, a construction scandal and bribery affair concerning the new Vienna General Hospital, and, in particular, the crisis of increasing debts of the nationalized industry, above all the VÖEST-Alpine steel conglomerate based in Linz. Close to the end of his period in office, Sinowatz also came under pressure after Defense Minister Friedhelm Frischenschlager of his coalition partner, the Freedom Party, officially received the former Sturmbannführer Walter Reder, a convicted war criminal who had been imprisoned in Italy since World War II, upon his return to Austria.

Since Sinowatz' contemplative manner was not very typical of that of politicians, he often earned pitiful smiles, for example, for his 1983 government declaration quote Ich weiß schon, (...) das ist alles sehr kompliziert so wie diese Welt, in der wir leben und handeln... ("I know well, (...) that is all very complicated just like this world in which we live and act..."), usually rendered as Es ist alles sehr kompliziert ("Everything is very complicated").

== Waldheim Affair ==
During a meeting of the steering committee of the Burgenland SPÖ before the 1986 presidential election, according to a later rendering by board member Ottilie Matysek, Chancellor Sinowatz insinuated that one would have to point out to the Austrians that the candidate of the conservative Austrian People's Party (ÖVP), the former UN Secretary-General Kurt Waldheim, had a "brown" (i.e. Nazi) past. By an indiscretion, this remark was passed on to the weekly magazine profil, which started to investigate the matter and triggered the Waldheim debate.

During the presidential campaign, Sinowatz strongly opposed Waldheim. When Waldheim gave assurances that he had not been a member of the Sturmabteilung (SA) Equestrian Corps, but had only joined its members in riding occasionally, Sinowatz countered: "So we note that Kurt Waldheim never was a member of the SA, but only his horse."

After Waldheim's election in the second round, Sinowatz resigned and passed on his post as chancellor to Finance Minister Franz Vranitzky, who also succeeded him as SPÖ chairman in 1988. At the same time, Sinowatz also resigned as an MP of the Austrian National Council.

== Later years ==
Sinowatz sued the profil journalist Alfred Worm for libel because of reports concerning Sinowatz' internal announcements to reveal Waldheim's past. Even though all top representatives of the Burgenland SPÖ, including Landeshauptmann governor Johann Sipötz, gave testimony in his favor when he denied the accuracy of Ottilie Matysek's (who had by then left the SPÖ) depiction of the events, the court gave more weight to the authenticity of her hand-written notes and dismissed the suit. This also led to Sipötz's resignation and Sinowatz' conviction for giving false evidence in 1991.

Sinowatz retired to private life in his Burgenland home. Another indictment in the VÖEST Noricum scandal trial ended with his acquittal in 1993. In July 2008 he had to be taken to the Vienna General Hospital to undergo cardiac surgery. He died two weeks later at the age of 79. At the time of his death, he was the oldest living former Austrian chancellor.

== See also ==
- Politics of Austria

== Note ==
- This article draws heavily on the corresponding article in the German Wikipedia, as of 21 January 2005.

Political offices
Preceded by Hannes Androsch	Vice-Chancellor of Austria; 1981–1983	Succeeded by Norbert Steger
Preceded by Bruno Kreisky	Chancellor of Austria; 1983–1986	Succeeded by Franz Vranitzky
Party political offices
Preceded by Bruno Kreisky	Chair of the SPÖ; 1983–1988	Succeeded by Franz Vranitzky
