= Vice-Chancellor of Austria =

Public official

Vice-Chancellor of the Republic of Austria
- Vizekanzler der Republik Österreich
- Coat of arms of Austria

- Flag of Austria

- Incumbent; Andreas Babler since 3 March 2025
- Executive branch of the Government of Austria
- Style: Mr Vice-Chancellor (informal); His Excellency (diplomatic)
- Member of: Cabinet
- Seat: Vienna
- Nominator: Chancellor of Austria
- Appointer: President of Austria
- Constituting instrument: Constitution of Austria
- Formation: 15 March 1919; 107 years ago
- First holder: Jodok Fink
- Website: www.bmoeds.gv.at

The vice-chancellor of Austria is a member of the Government of Austria and is the deputy to the Chancellor. It is functionally equivalent to a deputy prime minister in other countries with parliamentary systems.

The current vice-chancellor is Andreas Babler of the Social Democratic Party, since 3 March 2025.

== Description of the office ==
Art. 69(2) of the Constitution of Austria states:

The Vice-Chancellor stands in for the Federal Chancellor in his complete field of functions. If both Federal Chancellor and Vice Chancellor are hindered, the Federal President appoints a member of the government to represent the Federal Chancellor.

In practice, the Vice-Chancellor is normally the leading member of the junior party within the current coalition government, frequently the party chairman. If only one party is represented in the government, the Vice Chancellor is often the Chancellor's presumed successor.

== List of officeholders (1919–present) ==
=== Vice-chancellors of Austria during the Interwar period ===
No.	Portrait	Vice-Chancellor	Took office	Left office	Time in office	Party	Chancellor
1	Jodok Fink	Jodok Fink (1853–1929)	15 March 1919	26 March 1920	1 year, 11 days	CS	Karl Renner (SDAPÖ)
2	Ferdinand Hanusch	Ferdinand Hanusch (1866–1926)	7 July 1920	22 October 1920	210 days	SPÖ	Michael Mayr (CS)
3	Eduard Heinl	Eduard Heinl (1880–1957)	22 October 1920	20 November 1920	29 days	CS	Michael Mayr (CS)
4	Walter Breisky	Walter Breisky (1871–1944)	20 November 1920	30 May 1922	1 year, 191 days	CS	Michael Mayr (CS); Johannes Schober (Ind); Himself (CS); Johannes Schober (Ind)
5	Felix Frank	Felix Frank (1876–1957)	31 May 1922	20 November 1924	2 years, 173 days	GDVP	Ignaz Seipel (CS)
6	Leopold Waber	Leopold Waber (1875–1945)	20 November 1924	20 October 1926	1 year, 334 days	GDVP	Rudolf Ramek (CS)
7	Franz Dinghofer	Franz Dinghofer (1873–1956)	20 October 1926	19 May 1927	211 days	GDVP	Ignaz Seipel (CS)
8	Karl Hartleb [de]	Karl Hartleb (1886–1965)	19 May 1927	4 May 1929	1 year, 350 days	Landbund	Ignaz Seipel (CS)
9	Vinzenz Schumy [de]	Vinzenz Schumy (1878–1962)	4 May 1929	26 September 1929	145 days	Landbund	Ernst Streeruwitz (CS)
10	Carl Vaugoin	Carl Vaugoin (1873–1949)	26 September 1929	30 September 1930	1 year, 4 days	CS	Johannes Schober (Ind)
11	Richard Schmitz	Richard Schmitz (1885–1954)	30 September 1930	4 December 1930	65 days	CS	Carl Vaugoin (CS)
12	Johannes Schober	Johannes Schober (1874–1932) (Beamter)	4 December 1930	29 January 1932	1 year, 56 days	Nonpartisan	Otto Ender (CS); Karl Buresch (CS)
13	Franz Winkler [de]	Franz Winkler (1890–1945)	29 January 1932	21 September 1933	1 year, 235 days	Landbund	Karl Buresch (CS); Engelbert Dollfuss (CS)
14	Emil Fey	Emil Fey (1886–1938)	21 September 1933	1 May 1934	222 days	Heimatblock	Engelbert Dollfuss (VF)
15	Ernst Rüdiger Starhemberg	Ernst Rüdiger Starhemberg (1899–1956)	1 May 1934	14 May 1936	2 years, 13 days	Heimatblock	Kurt Schuschnigg (act.) (VF); Ernst Rüdiger Starhemberg (act.) (VF); Kurt Schuschnigg (VF)
16	Eduard Baar-Baarenfels	Eduard Baar-Baarenfels (1885–1967)	14 May 1936	3 November 1936	173 days	Heimatblock	Kurt Schuschnigg (VF)
17	Ludwig Hülgerth	Ludwig Hülgerth (1875–1939)	3 November 1936	11 March 1938	1 year, 128 days	VF	Kurt Schuschnigg (VF)
18	Edmund Glaise-Horstenau	Edmund Glaise-Horstenau (1882–1946)	11 March 1938	13 March 1938	2 days	NSDAP	Arthur Seyss-Inquart (NSDAP)

Austria was annexed by Nazi Germany in 1938 (see Austria within Nazi Germany for details). Independence was restored in 1945.

=== Vice-chancellors of Austria after the end of World War II ===
Vice-Chancellor	Party	Took office	Left office	Duration	Chancellor(s)
Johann Koplenig (1891–1968)	KPÖ	27 April 1945	20 December 1945	237 days	Renner (SPÖ)
Adolf Schärf (1890–1965)	SPÖ	20 December 1945	22 May 1957	11 years, 153 days	Renner (SPÖ); Figl (ÖVP); Raab (ÖVP)
Bruno Pittermann (1905–1983)	SPÖ	22 May 1957	19 April 1966	8 years, 332 days	Raab (ÖVP); Gorbach (ÖVP); Klaus (ÖVP)
Fritz Bock (1911–1993)	ÖVP	19 April 1966	19 January 1968	1 year, 275 days	Klaus (ÖVP)
Hermann Withalm (1912–2003)	ÖVP	19 January 1968	21 April 1970	2 years, 92 days	Klaus (ÖVP)
Rudolf Häuser (1909–2000)	SPÖ	21 April 1970	30 September 1976	6 years, 162 days	Kreisky (SPÖ)
Hannes Androsch (1938–2024)	SPÖ	1 October 1976	20 January 1981	4 years, 111 days	Kreisky (SPÖ)
Fred Sinowatz (1929–2008)	SPÖ	20 January 1981	24 May 1983	2 years, 124 days	Kreisky (SPÖ)
Norbert Steger (born 1944)	FPÖ	24 May 1983	21 January 1987	3 years, 242 days	Sinowatz (SPÖ); Vranitzky (SPÖ)
Alois Mock (1934–2017)	ÖVP	21 January 1987	24 April 1989	2 years, 93 days	Vranitzky (SPÖ)
Josef Riegler (born 1938)	ÖVP	24 April 1989	2 July 1991	2 years, 69 days	Vranitzky (SPÖ)
Erhard Busek (1941–2022)	ÖVP	2 July 1991	4 May 1995	3 years, 306 days	Vranitzky (SPÖ)
Wolfgang Schüssel (born 1945)	ÖVP	4 May 1995	4 February 2000	4 years, 276 days	Vranitzky (SPÖ); Klima (SPÖ)
Susanne Riess-Passer (born 1961)	FPÖ	4 February 2000	28 February 2003	3 years, 24 days	Schüssel (ÖVP)
Herbert Haupt (born 1947)	FPÖ	28 February 2003	21 October 2003	235 days	Schüssel (ÖVP)
Hubert Gorbach (born 1956)	BZÖ	21 October 2003	11 January 2007	3 years, 82 days	Schüssel (ÖVP)
Wilhelm Molterer (born 1955)	ÖVP	11 January 2007	2 December 2008	1 year, 326 days	Gusenbauer (SPÖ)
Josef Pröll (born 1968)	ÖVP	2 December 2008	21 April 2011	2 years, 140 days	Faymann (SPÖ)
Michael Spindelegger (born 1959)	ÖVP	21 April 2011	1 September 2014	3 years, 133 days	Faymann (SPÖ)
Reinhold Mitterlehner (born 1955)	ÖVP	1 September 2014	17 May 2017	2 years, 258 days	Faymann (SPÖ); Kern (SPÖ)
Wolfgang Brandstetter (born 1957)	Independent	17 May 2017	18 December 2017	215 days	Kern (SPÖ)
Heinz-Christian Strache (born 1969)	FPÖ	18 December 2017	22 May 2019	1 year, 155 days	Kurz (ÖVP)
Hartwig Löger (born 1965)	ÖVP	22 May 2019	3 June 2019	12 days	Kurz (ÖVP)
Clemens Jabloner (born 1948)	Independent	3 June 2019	1 October 2019	120 days	Bierlein (Ind.)
Werner Kogler (born 1961)	Greens	7 January 2020	2 October 2024	4 years, 269 days	Kurz (ÖVP); Schallenberg (ÖVP); Nehammer (ÖVP)
Andreas Babler (born 1973)	SPÖ	3 March 2025	Incumbent	1 year, 245 days	Stocker (ÖVP)

== Longest-serving vice-chancellors ==
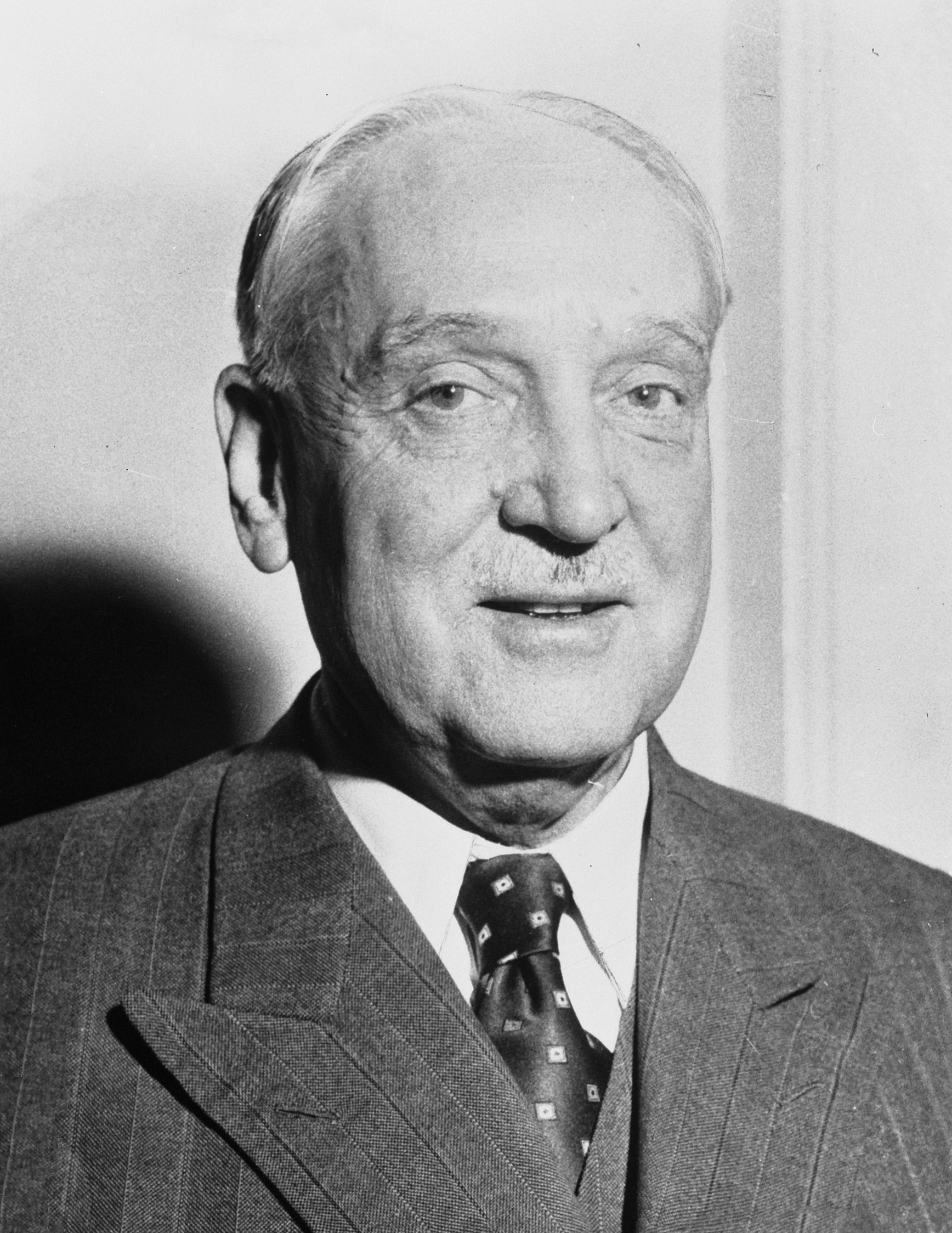
Adolf Schärf - first and longest serving vice chancellor

The following table lists all vice-chancellors of the Second Republic (since 1945) ranked by their length of tenure, with the incumbent vice-chancellor's tenure automatically updating daily.

Rank	Vice-Chancellor	Length of tenure	Timespan	Party
1	Adolf Schärf	11 years, 153 days	1945–1957	SPÖ
2	Bruno Pittermann	8 years, 332 days	1957–1966	SPÖ
3	Rudolf Häuser	6 years, 162 days	1970–1976	SPÖ
4	Wolfgang Schüssel	4 years, 276 days	1995–2000	ÖVP
5	Werner Kogler	4 years, 269 days	2020–2024	Greens
6	Hannes Androsch	4 years, 111 days	1976–1981	SPÖ
7	Erhard Busek	3 years, 306 days	1991–1995	ÖVP
8	Norbert Steger	3 years, 242 days	1983–1987	FPÖ
9	Michael Spindelegger	3 years, 133 days	2011–2014	ÖVP
10	Hubert Gorbach	3 years, 82 days	2003–2007	BZÖ
11	Susanne Riess-Passer	3 years, 24 days	2000–2003	FPÖ
12	Reinhold Mitterlehner	2 years, 258 days	2014–2017	ÖVP
13	Josef Pröll	2 years, 140 days	2008–2011	ÖVP
14	Fred Sinowatz	2 years, 124 days	1981–1983	SPÖ
15	Alois Mock	2 years, 93 days	1987–1989	ÖVP
16	Hermann Withalm	2 years, 92 days	1968–1970	ÖVP
17	Josef Riegler	2 years, 69 days	1989–1991	ÖVP
18	Wilhelm Molterer	1 year, 326 days	2007–2008	ÖVP
19	Fritz Bock	1 year, 275 days	1966–1968	ÖVP
20	Andreas Babler	1 year, 245 days	2025–present	SPÖ
21	Heinz-Christian Strache	1 year, 155 days	2017–2019	FPÖ
22	Herbert Haupt	235 days	2003	FPÖ
23	Wolfgang Brandstetter	215 days	2017	IND
24	Clemens Jabloner	121 days	2019	IND
25	Hartwig Löger	12 days	2019	ÖVP

== Vice-chancellors by party ==
The following table summarizes vice-chancellors of the Second Republic grouped by political party.

Party	Total time in office	Number of vice-chancellors	Vice-chancellors
**SPÖ; Social Democratic Party**	35 years, 31 days (ongoing)	6	Adolf Schärf, Bruno Pittermann, Rudolf Häuser, Hannes Androsch, Fred Sinowatz, **Andreas Babler**
ÖVP; Austrian People's Party	27 years, 161 days	11	Fritz Bock, Hermann Withalm, Alois Mock, Josef Riegler, Erhard Busek, Wolfgang Schüssel, Wilhelm Molterer, Josef Pröll, Michael Spindelegger, Reinhold Mitterlehner, Hartwig Löger
FPÖ; Freedom Party	8 years, 293 days	4	Norbert Steger, Susanne Riess-Passer, Herbert Haupt, Heinz-Christian Strache
Greens; The Greens	4 years, 270 days	1	Werner Kogler
BZÖ; Alliance for the Future of Austria	3 years, 83 days	1	Hubert Gorbach
IND; Independent	336 days	2	Wolfgang Brandstetter, Clemens Jabloner

Notes:

- Green indicates the party of the current incumbent vice-chancellor
- Bold name indicates the current incumbent vice-chancellor
- SPÖ total time includes the ongoing tenure of Andreas Babler

== Age-related statistics ==
The following table shows age-related data for all vice-chancellors of the Second Republic, with living vice-chancellors' ages automatically updating.

Vice-Chancellor	Born	Age at start of vice-chancellorship	Age at end of vice-chancellorship	Post-office timespan	Died	Lifespan
Adolf Schärf	20 April 1890	55 years, 244 days 20 December 1945	67 years, 32 days 22 May 1957	7 years, 282 days	28 February 1965	74 years, 314 days
Bruno Pittermann	3 September 1905	51 years, 261 days 22 May 1957	60 years, 228 days 19 April 1966	17 years, 153 days	19 September 1983	78 years, 16 days
Fritz Bock	26 February 1911	55 years, 52 days 19 April 1966	56 years, 327 days 19 January 1968	25 years, 327 days	12 December 1993	82 years, 289 days
Hermann Withalm	21 April 1912	55 years, 273 days 19 January 1968	58 years, 0 days 21 April 1970	33 years, 120 days	19 August 2003	91 years, 120 days
Rudolf Häuser	19 March 1909	61 years, 33 days 21 April 1970	67 years, 195 days 30 September 1976	23 years, 176 days	24 March 2000	91 years, 5 days
Hannes Androsch	18 April 1938	38 years, 166 days 1 October 1976	42 years, 277 days 20 January 1981	43 years, 326 days	11 December 2024	86 years, 237 days
Fred Sinowatz	5 February 1929	51 years, 350 days 20 January 1981	54 years, 108 days 24 May 1983	25 years, 79 days	11 August 2008	79 years, 188 days
Norbert Steger	6 March 1944	39 years, 79 days 24 May 1983	42 years, 321 days 21 January 1987	39 years, 286 days	—	82 years, 242 days
Alois Mock	10 June 1934	52 years, 225 days 21 January 1987	54 years, 318 days 24 April 1989	28 years, 38 days	1 June 2017	82 years, 356 days
Josef Riegler	1 November 1938	50 years, 174 days 24 April 1989	52 years, 243 days 2 July 1991	35 years, 124 days	—	88 years, 2 days
Erhard Busek	25 March 1941	50 years, 99 days 2 July 1991	54 years, 40 days 4 May 1995	26 years, 313 days	13 March 2022	80 years, 353 days
Wolfgang Schüssel	7 June 1945	49 years, 331 days 4 May 1995	54 years, 242 days 4 February 2000	26 years, 272 days	—	81 years, 149 days
Susanne Riess-Passer	3 January 1961	39 years, 32 days 4 February 2000	42 years, 56 days 28 February 2003	23 years, 248 days	—	65 years, 304 days
Herbert Haupt	28 September 1947	55 years, 153 days 28 February 2003	56 years, 23 days 21 October 2003	23 years, 13 days	—	79 years, 36 days
Hubert Gorbach	27 July 1956	47 years, 86 days 21 October 2003	50 years, 168 days 11 January 2007	19 years, 296 days	—	70 years, 99 days
Wilhelm Molterer	14 May 1955	51 years, 242 days 11 January 2007	53 years, 202 days 2 December 2008	17 years, 336 days	—	71 years, 173 days
Josef Pröll	14 September 1968	40 years, 79 days 2 December 2008	42 years, 219 days 21 April 2011	15 years, 196 days	—	58 years, 50 days
Michael Spindelegger	21 December 1959	51 years, 121 days 21 April 2011	54 years, 254 days 1 September 2014	12 years, 63 days	—	66 years, 317 days
Reinhold Mitterlehner	10 December 1955	58 years, 265 days 1 September 2014	61 years, 158 days 17 May 2017	9 years, 170 days	—	70 years, 328 days
Wolfgang Brandstetter	7 October 1957	59 years, 222 days 17 May 2017	60 years, 72 days 18 December 2017	8 years, 320 days	—	69 years, 27 days
Heinz-Christian Strache	12 June 1969	48 years, 189 days 18 December 2017	49 years, 344 days 22 May 2019	7 years, 165 days	—	57 years, 144 days
Hartwig Löger	15 July 1965	53 years, 311 days 22 May 2019	53 years, 323 days 3 June 2019	7 years, 153 days	—	61 years, 111 days
Clemens Jabloner	28 November 1948	70 years, 187 days 3 June 2019	70 years, 308 days 2 October 2019	7 years, 32 days	—	77 years, 340 days
Werner Kogler	20 November 1961	58 years, 48 days 7 January 2020	62 years, 317 days 2 October 2024	2 years, 32 days	—	64 years, 348 days
Andreas Babler	25 February 1973	52 years, 6 days 3 March 2025	Incumbent			53 years, 251 days

Notes:

- Light green indicates living former vice-chancellors
- Green indicates the current incumbent vice-chancellor
- Living vice-chancellors' post-office timespan and lifespan automatically update daily

== Graphical representation ==
This is a graphical lifespan timeline of the vice-chancellors of Austria since 1945. They are listed in order of first assuming office.

The following chart shows vice-chancellors by their age (living vice-chancellors in green), with the years of their time in office in color.

== See also ==
- List of chancellors of Austria
