= Hannes Androsch =

Austrian businessman and consultant (1938–2024)

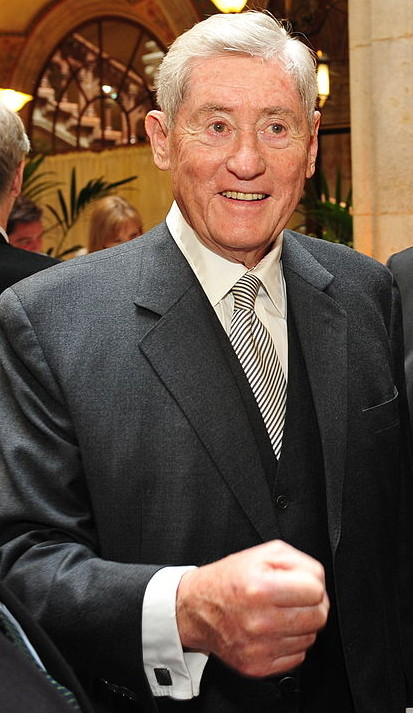
- Androsch in 2013

Vice-Chancellor of Austria
- In office 1 October 1976 – 20 January 1981
- Chancellor: Bruno Kreisky
- Preceded by: Hermann Withalm
- Succeeded by: Fred Sinowatz

Federal Minister of Finance
- In office 21 April 1970 – 20 January 1981
- Chancellor: Bruno Kreisky
- Preceded by: Stephan Koren
- Succeeded by: Herbert Salcher

Personal details
- Born: Johannes Androsch; 18 April 1938 Vienna, Austria
- Died: 11 December 2024 (aged 86) Vienna, Austria
- Party: Social Democratic Party of Austria
- Education: Vienna University of Economics and Business

Johannes "Hannes" Androsch (German: [ˈhanəs ˈandʁoʃ]; 18 April 1938 – 11 December 2024) was an Austrian businessman, consultant and Social Democrat politician. He served as an Austrian Finance Minister from 1970 to 1981, and as Vice Chancellor from 1976 to 1981. As a banker, from 1981 to 1988 he was the general director of the Creditanstalt-Bankverein (Austria’s leading bank at that time), and subsequently an advisor to the World Bank. From 1989 onward he built an industrial investment group, Androsch International Consulting (AIC), which is a major factor in Austria's internationally active corporate landscape. In addition, Androsch's foundation is an important sponsor of research and development activities in Austria, where he was regularly consulted on matters of political, economic and financial importance.

== Youth and early political activities ==
Androsch was born on 18 April 1938 in Vienna, where his parents, Hans and Lia, were tax advisors in the district Floridsdorf. The family lived through the end of World War II in Southern Bohemia, where they witnessed the expulsion of Germans from Czechoslovakia in June 1945. His mother placed seven-year-old Hannes on the window sill and instructed him to watch the events closely so that he would never forget. Androsch concluded his high school education in Vienna in 1956. He proceeded to study business administration at the University of World Trade (today's Vienna University of Economics and Business), where he obtained his diploma in 1959, followed by a doctorate in 1969.

His political activities manifested early, and took him to the top position in the Vienna branch of the student organization of the Socialist party (1960–1961), and then to leadership of the national organization (1962–1963). Thereafter, at the age of only 25 years, he became secretary for economic issues in the club of the Socialist members of parliament, a position which he held until 1966.

== Rise and fall as a politician ==
1967 was a fateful year for Androsch: he was certified as a public accountant and tax advisor, allowing him to participate in the financial consulting enterprise which his parents had significantly expanded; and he became a member of parliament for the Socialist party where he earned himself a reputation as a shooting star. When Bruno Kreisky turned the tables on Austria's political scenery with the 1970 national election he made the 32-year-old Androsch Finance Minister in his first minority cabinet on 21 April 1970. Androsch continued in this function when the Socialist single-party government consolidated its dominance through the absolute majorities won in the elections of 1971 and 1975. Although he had not been Kreisky's first choice for this position (Schachner-Blazizek and Felix Slavik had declined) the two men developed a working relationship that was, initially, very good. Androsch became a strong advocate of Keynesian economics, in a modification that became known as “Austro-Keynesianism.”

On 1 October 1976, Androsch was made Vice-Chancellor of Austria while remaining minister of finance. In this capacity he became chairman of the OECD at ministerial level in 1979, and also served as chairman of the Interim Committee of the International Monetary Fund.

While Androsch had built an excellent political network within the centrist wing of the Socialist party and especially the Austrian Trade Union Federation (ÖGB), not everybody was happy with his rapid rise. The fact that the Austrian print media, who for the most part venerated Kreisky and had adorned him with the nickname "Sun King," started to refer to Androsch as the "Crown Prince" did not help. When in 1975 Androsch differed with Kreisky on how to handle the reconfiguration of Austria's state-owned industry, and expressed his wish to become president of the national bank instead of continuing in the government, Kreisky himself became suspicious of the young man he had mentored for years. He started to take exception to a highly problematic incompatibility that had been public knowledge since Androsch became a member of the government: he still owned the tax advisor company (renamed Consultatio in 1970) which he had taken over from his parents, although he had placed it in escrow when he became a finance minister.

Towards the end of 1980, after long and intense campaigns by Austria's media and a continued deterioration of his relationship with Kreisky, Androsch resigned from his political positions on 20 January 1981.

== Second career as a banker ==
The government appointed Androsch as the governor of the state-owned Creditanstalt, Austria’s leading bank at that time, a little later in 1981. However, he continued to face heavy opposition and revelations made by investigative journalists (especially Alfred Worm), that culminated in a series of investigations of his personal financial conduct, which in part predated his public role or were not demonstrably connected with it. Androsch repeatedly stated (and repeated these allegations in a series of interviews published by the Austrian newspaper "Die Presse" in February and March 2010; see sources) that his Socialist successors in the finance ministry, Herbert Salcher and Franz Vranitzky (who had been Androsch's secretary, and would later rise to chancellorship) had conspired with Kreisky, "who was simply jealous", (and with political opponent Alois Mock) to "construe the financial and legal proceedings against him", that would not be finally settled for the following 16 years. "I had no chance to even be heard. And many who have participated in this vendetta would now rather pretend that nothing had ever happened."

A central point of Androsch's defence concerning his personal finances — he claimed that a rich "uncle-by-choice" ("Wahlonkel" in German) had provided him with significant funds, and habitually replied "alas, no" when asked if he was a millionaire — did not hold. On 8 October 1991 Androsch was convicted by the Vienna Regional Criminal Court of having evaded taxes between 1974 and 1983 in the amount of about five million Austrian schillings (roughly corresponding to €500,000 expressed in 2010 currency), a minuscule fraction of the original allegations. He was sentenced to a fine of 1.8 million Austrian schillings.

A legally separate but politically related affair (a conviction for false testimony to the parliamentary examination board investigating the scandal surrounding the Vienna General Hospital) forced Androsch to resign from the Creditanstalt post in January 1988. With the help of a Swiss member of the Bilderberg Group, he became a consultant to the World Bank, especially for China and parts of Africa, until 1989. Androsch was a onetime member of the Steering Committee of the Bilderberg Group.

== Third career as an industrial investor ==
In 1989 Androsch founded AIC Androsch International Management Consulting GmbH, which in 1994 commenced its corporate investment and acquisition activity. Its offices are situated at the Ringstraße, opposite the Vienna opera house.

By way of AIC, Androsch was co-owner and president of the supervisory board of the following Austrian companies:

- Austria Technologie und Systemtechnik (AT&S) AG, Europe's largest manufacturer of printed circuit boards with offices in Vienna and Leoben
- Salinen Austria AG, Austria's salt mining and processing company and a significant player in Europe
- bwin.com Interactive Entertainment AG, a developer and marketer of online gambling and gaming products in Vienna

Former investments of Androsch's holdings included major stakes in Future Advanced Composite Components (FACC) AG in Ried im Innkreis (acquired by Xi'an Aircraft Industrial Corporation in 2009) and in KTM Sportmotorcycle AG. In 2000, he was a major founding investor of Austrian prepaid payment method paysafecard, until it was finally sold to British Skrill group for €140 million in 2014.

Androsch was also president of the supervisory board of the Austrian Institute of Technology (AIT; formerly Austrian Research Centers, ARC) in Seibersdorf, a position in which he was succeeded by Peter Schwab. He was deputy chairman of the supervisory board of FIMBAG Finanzmarktbeteiligung AG, the vehicle through which the state-owned Österreichische Industrieholding controls its stakes in Austrian banking system. He was once chairman of the Council of the University of Leoben.

Following the collapse of Refco, a class-action lawsuitsuit in the US caused considerable difficulties for BAWAG P.S.K., the Austrian trade union's bank. Androsch and other Austrian investors formed a consortium with Cerberus Capital Management, which acquired the bank in 2006.

In 2006 the Austrian economics magazine trend estimated Androsch's wealth at €420 million, ranking him 25th among the wealthiest Austrians. Using a modified rating that also considered networking, the magazine ranked him the 22nd most powerful person in Austria's economy in 2009.

== Research sponsorships ==
On 21 June 2004, the founding session of the Hannes Androsch Foundation within the Austrian Academy of Sciences was held. It is dedicated to "the consolidation of social balance and peace." Androsch endowed it with €1 million and committed himself to increase the annual budget to €10 million until 2012. It awards the Hannes Androsch Prize (€100,000 for 2011) for scientific contributions to its goals. According to the academy, this is the most important private non-profit foundation established in Austria since 1945.

Androsch was a member of the fundraising committee of the Institute of Molecular Biotechnology, a joint initiative of the Austrian Academy of Sciences and the pharmaceutical company Boehringer Ingelheim.

== Death ==
Androsch died on 11 December 2024, at the age of 86.

== Honours ==
Androsch was awarded a significant number of international honors, among them an honorary doctorate in economics from the University of New Orleans

- Grand Decoration of Honour in Gold with Sash of the Decoration of Honour for Services to the Republic of Austria (1974)
- Order of Merit of the Polish People's Republic, 2nd class (1977)
- Medal of Tyrol (1978)
- Commemorative Medal of the Parliament of the Czech Republic (1979)
- Grand Cross of the Order of the Polar Star (Sweden, 1979)
- Honorary Ring of Altaussee (1998)
- Grand Gold Decoration with Star of Styria (1998)
- Cross of Honour of the Workers' Samaritan Federation on Red-White-Red Sash (2000)
- Gold Medal of the Society of St. Christoph (2001)
- Honorary Ring of Leoben (2002)
- Viktor Adler badge of the SPÖ (2003)
- Medal of Hall in Tirol (2003)
- Honorary Ring of Fehring (2004)
- Sigillum Civitatis in Leoben (Seal of the citizenship of Leoben) (2005)
- Honorary Senator of the University of Mining Leoben (2008)
- Austrian Cross of Honour for Science and Art, 1st class (2008)
- Honorary Senator of the Vienna University of Economics and Business (1983)
- Honorary citizen of Fohnsdorf (1998)
- Honorary Member of the Vienna Economic Club (2001)
- Appointed a new, highly productive reservoir part in Altaussee salt mine (Hannes Androsch horizon) (2003)
- Honorary Chairman of the Workers' Samaritan Federation (2005)
- Honorary Citizen of Leoben (2008)
- Honorary Member of the Musikalische Jugend Österreichs

== Sources ==
- Androsch biography at the website of the Austrian Parliament
- Androsch biography by Robert Sterk (German)
- "Es war nie eine Vater-Sohn-Beziehung" (It never was a father-son relationship"). Interview given to the newspaper Die Presse, 28 February 2010
- "Der Kanzler war einfach eifersüchtig" ("The chancellor was simply jealous"). Interview given to the newspaper Die Presse, 20 March 2010
- "Da hast du keine Chance gehabt" (You've never had a chance"). Interview given to the newspaper Die Presse, 27 March 2010
