= Adolf Schärf =

President of Austria from 1957 to 1965

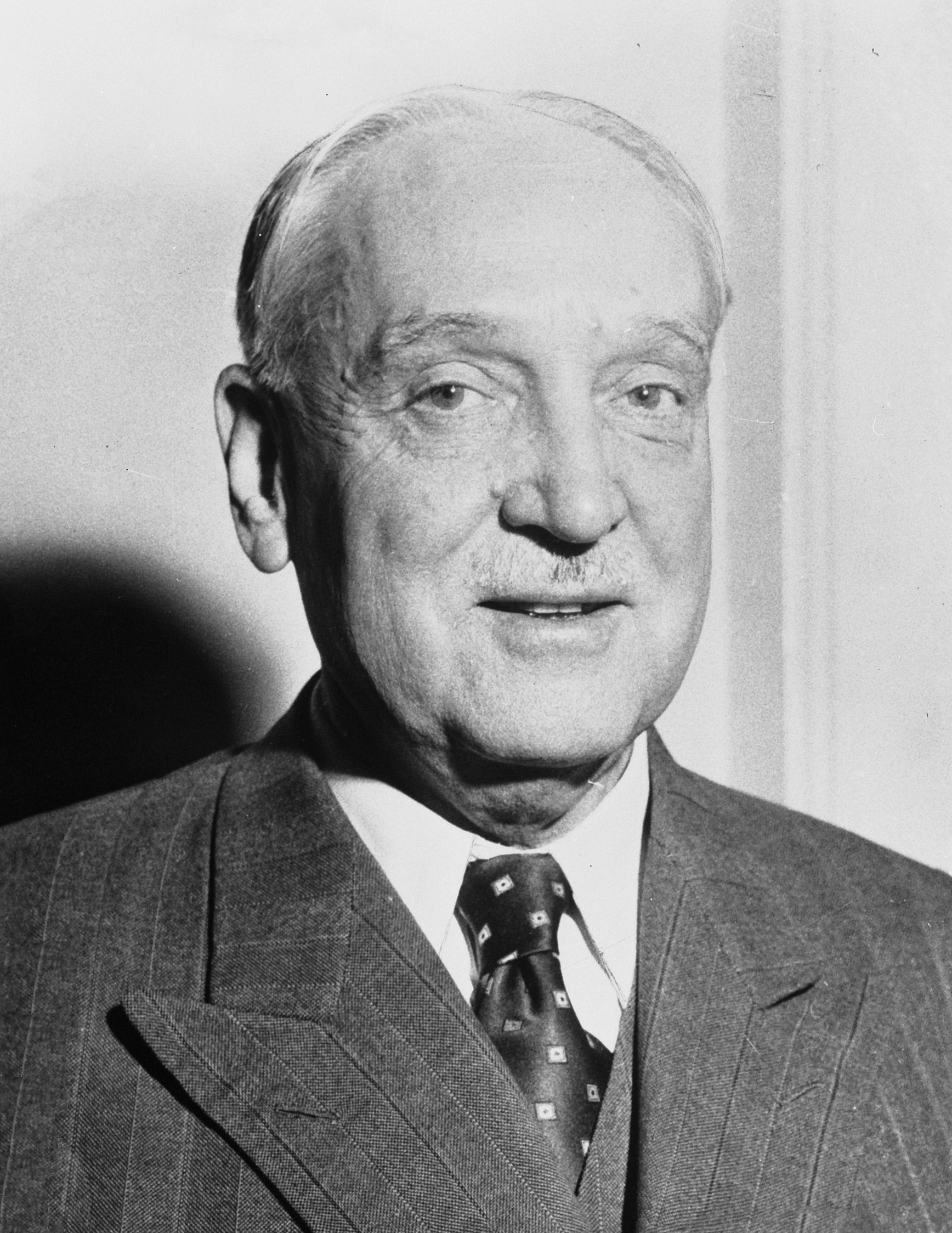
- Schärf in 1961

President of Austria
- In office 22 May 1957 – 28 February 1965
- Chancellor: Julius Raab; Alfons Gorbach; Josef Klaus
- Preceded by: Theodor Körner
- Succeeded by: Franz Jonas

Vice-Chancellor of Austria
- In office 27 April 1945 – 22 May 1957 Serving with Leopold Figl (1945), Johann Koplenig (1945)
- Chancellor: Karl Renner; Leopold Figl; Julius Raab
- Preceded by: Edmund Glaise-Horstenau (1938)
- Succeeded by: Bruno Pittermann

Chair of the Social Democratic Party
- In office 14 April 1945 – 8 May 1957
- Preceded by: Karl Seitz (SDAP)
- Succeeded by: Bruno Pittermann

Personal details
- Born: 20 April 1890 Nikolsburg, Moravia, Austria-Hungary
- Died: 28 February 1965 (aged 74) Vienna, Austria
- Party: Social Democratic Party
- Spouse: Hilda Schärf (died 1956)

Adolf Schärf (German: [ˈaːdɔlf ˈʃɛʁf]; 20 April 1890 – 28 February 1965) was an Austrian politician of the Socialist Party of Austria (SPÖ). He served as the vice-chancellor from 1945 to 1957 and as the president of Austria from 1957 until his death.

== Life ==
Schärf was born in Nikolsburg, Moravia (present-day Mikulov, Czech Republic), into a poor working-class family. Living in the Austro-Hungarian capital Vienna from 1899, he attended the gymnasium in Hernals and went on to study at the University of Vienna. The talented young man put himself through law school working part-time and with a scholarship granted for academic excellence. He received a doctorate in summer 1914 and, upon the outbreak of World War I four weeks later, volunteered for service in the Austro-Hungarian Army.

=== Political career ===
At the end of the Great War, Schärf was discharged as a Second Lieutenant. Having witnessed the defeat and dissolution of the Austro-Hungarian monarchy, he entered politics and, through the mediation of the deputy Otto Glöckel, found employment as the secretary of the Social Democratic president of the National Council parliament Karl Seitz. He held the post as a secretary throughout the years of the First Austrian Republic until the resignation of Parliament President Karl Renner in March 1933. Schärf, as well as Karl Seitz and the Austromarxist party official Otto Bauer, had urged Renner to step down from office, which proved to be fatal as it gave the government of Chancellor Engelbert Dollfuss the opportunity to overthrow the parliamentary system.

Schärf became a deputy of the Federal Council in 1933, and though he kept aside from the Social Democratic Republikanischer Schutzbund paramilitaries, he was arrested after the 1934 February Uprising and lost his public offices in the course of the establishment of the Austrofascist dictatorship. Unemployed after the dissolution of the Social Democratic Party, he passed the Austrian bar exam in 1934 and worked as an associate with a law firm.

Upon the Austrian Anschluss to Nazi Germany in March 1938, Schärf was arrested and served time as a political prisoner of the Gestapo. However, three months later, he "aryanized" the office of Arnold Eisler, a Jewish lawyer and party colleague who had to leave Austria. He took over Eisler's law firm and it was never restituted. Later on, he also helped in the aryanization process of buildings in Vienna. On the other hand, Schärf avoided membership in the National Socialist Association of Legal Professionals and was in contact with resistance circles. There were contacts with the important resistance group (Maier-Mesner group, CASSIA) around the later executed priest Heinrich Maier, who was in contact with the American secret service OSS. Upon the outbreak of World War II, his only son Reinhold was conscripted in the Wehrmacht armed forces and was killed in action in 1941. After the 20 July plot in 1944 Schärf spent another five weeks in prison.

Immediately after the Soviet Vienna Offensive and the occupation of the city in April 1945, Schärf became acting chairman of the refounded Social Democratic Party of Austria and joined the Austrian national unity government of Chancellor Karl Renner. Together with Renner, the Conservative politician Leopold Figl and the Communist Johann Koplenig he formed the first provisional cabinet of the Second Republic. After the 1945 legislative election Schärf became a member of the re-established National Council parliament. He served as Vice-Chancellor in the grand coalition governments between the Conservative People's Party and Social Democrats (the Communists were pushed out in 1947) under Chancellor Leopold Figl and his successor Julius Raab until 1957.

Schärf had reservations about the restitution of Jewish property and also about the return of emigrants like Bruno Kreisky in Austrian politics. He opposed any collaboration of Social Democrats with the Communist Party and instead approached the right-wing Federation of Independents, which, however, did not prevent the decline in votes for the Social Democratic Party in the 1949 legislative election. The SPÖ again became the strongest party upon the 1953 elections, which, however, was not sufficient for the appointment of a Social Democratic chancellor. In 1955, Schärf together with Chancellor Raab and Foreign minister Leopold Figl took part in the Moscow negotiations for the Austrian State Treaty, whereby he expressed strong reservations against the Declaration of Neutrality.

=== Presidency ===
When President Theodor Körner died in office on 4 January 1957, Schärf became the Social Democratic candidate in the presidential election held on May 5. Elected president, he assumed office on May 22. In June 1961 he hosted the Vienna summit meeting of US President John F. Kennedy and the Soviet Premier Nikita Khrushchev, including a ceremonious state banquet at Schönbrunn Palace whereby Schärf, a widower since 1956, presided together with his daughter Martha as "first lady".

A firm supporter of the Austrian Proporz system and collaborating with three Conservative chancellors (Raab, Gorbach and Klaus), Schärf gained recognition by exercising his office according to the principle of non-partisanship. He did, however, interfere in internal SPÖ affairs, which led to the resignation of Interior Minister Franz Olah in 1964. After a six-years term, Schärf was the first post-war president to be re-elected in 1963, defeating his Conservative rival Julius Raab.

Schärf died in office in 1965. He is buried in the Vienna Zentralfriedhof. A square in the Vienna Donaustadt district was named after him in 1983. In 1985 a monument in his honour, designed by Alfred Hrdlicka, was inaugurated near the Vienna Town Hall in the presence of his daughter.

== Suggestive abuse of biographical similarities ==
- The neo-Nazi song "Adolf's Ehrentag" by Frank Rennicke attempts to bypass German anti-Nazi glorification laws by pretending to be about Adolf Schärf instead of Adolf Hitler; at the end of the song similarities are listed: both are born on 20 April, both have been imprisoned and both were leaders of Austria.
- The same approach is visible in a poem by Wolf Martin, a columnist from the Kronen Zeitung, published in 1994 on the occasion of Adolf "Schärf"'s birthday which caused an uproar at the time.

== Sources ==
Political offices
Preceded by Theodor Körner	President of Austria; 1957 – 1965	Succeeded by Franz Jonas
Vacant Annexation by Germany Title last held by Edmund Glaise-Horstenau	Vice-Chancellor of Austria; 1945 – 1957	Succeeded by Bruno Pittermann
Party political offices
Preceded by Karl Seitz (SDAP)	Chair of the Social Democratic Party; 1945 – 1957	Succeeded by Bruno Pittermann
