= Herbert Salcher =

Austrian politician (1929–2021)

Minister of Social Affairs
- In office 21 April 1970 – 1 October 1976
- Preceded by: Grete Rehor
- Succeeded by: Rudolf Häuser

Federal Minister for Health and Environmental Protection
- In office 5 November 1979 – 20 January 1981
- Preceded by: Hertha Firnberg
- Succeeded by: Kurt Steyrer

Minister of Finance
- In office 20 January 1981 – 10 September 1984
- Preceded by: Hannes Androsch
- Succeeded by: Franz Vranitzky

Member of the National Council of Austria
- In office 19 May 1983 – 31 May 1983

Personal details
- Born: 3 November 1929 Innsbruck, First Austrian Republic
- Died: 9 November 2021 (aged 92)
- Party: SPÖ

Herbert Salcher (3 November 1929 – 9 November 2021) was an Austrian politician. A member of the Social Democratic Party of Austria, he served as Minister of Social Affairs from 1970 to 1976, Federal Minister for Health and Environmental Protection from 1979 to 1981, and Minister of Finance. He also briefly served in the National Council in 1983.
