= Hartwig Löger =

Austrian politician and business executive

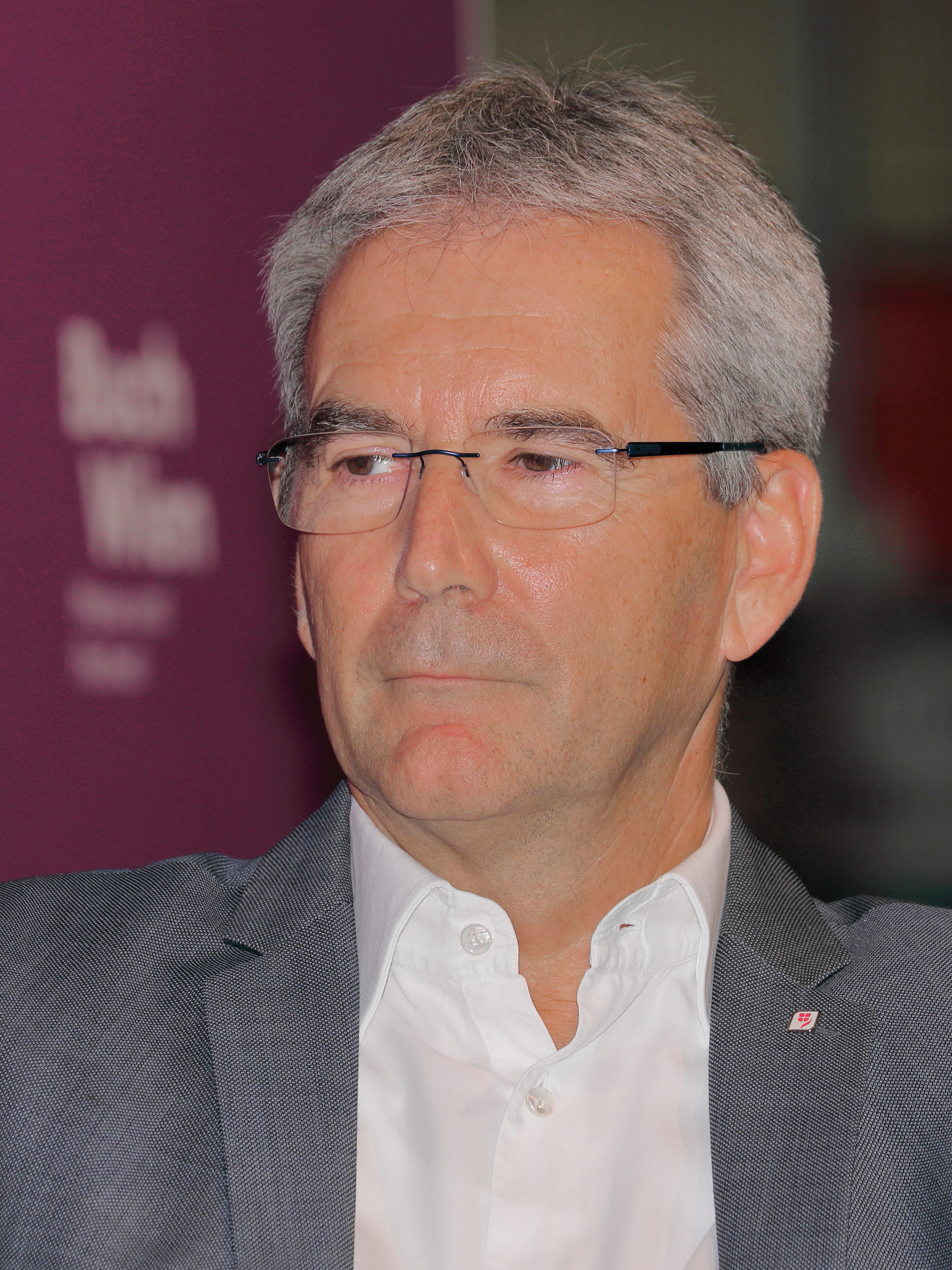
- Löger in 2025

Vice-Chancellor of Austria
- In office 22 May 2019 – 3 June 2019
- Chancellor: Sebastian Kurz
- Preceded by: Heinz-Christian Strache
- Succeeded by: Clemens Jabloner

Minister of Finance
- In office 18 December 2017 – 3 June 2019
- Chancellor: Sebastian Kurz
- Preceded by: Hans Jörg Schelling
- Succeeded by: Eduard Müller

Personal details
- Born: 15 July 1965 (age 61) Selzthal, Styria, Austria
- Party: People's Party
- Children: 2
- Education: Vienna University of Economics and Business; University of St. Gallen
- Website: Chancellery website; Parliament website

Hartwig Löger (Austrian German pronunciation: [ˈhartvɪɡ ˈløːɡɐ]; born 15 July 1965) is an Austrian politician and former business executive who served as minister of finance from 2017 to 2019. From 2011 to 2017 he was chief executive officer of UNIQA Austria. On 22 May 2019, following the Ibiza affair, he was named vice chancellor, and on 28 May 2019, he was sworn in as acting chancellor after Austria's first ever successful vote of no confidence against a cabinet, leaving this post on 3 June 2019.

== Early life and education ==
Löger was born in Selzthal in Styria and graduated in 1983 at the Stiftsgymnasium Admont. Originally striving for a career as pilot, Löger started an Offiziersanwärterausbildung at the Bundesheer and made the pilots entrance exam there. Because of a knee injury Löger failed the exam and randomly ended up in the insurance branch. 1987/88 he started visiting a course for insurance economy at the Vienna University of Economics and Business and from 1999 to 2001 he completed an international management course (IMEA) at the University of St. Gallen.

== Career ==
From 1985 to 1989 Löger worked as a customer adviser for an insurance agent. Subsequently, he started working for Allianz until 1996 as sales manager for the region Styria, then as assistant to the management at the Grazer Wechselseitige and until 2002 as sales manager at the Donau Versicherung AG. From 2002 to 2017 he worked for the Uniqa Insurance Group, first as managing director of the UNIQA International Versicherungs-Holding GmbH and later, until 2011, as head of the exclusive sales department. In 2011 he became a senior corporate officer at UNIQA and the chief executive officer of UNIQA Austria. In December 2017 he was succeeded as CEO by Kurt Svoboda.

From 2014 to February 2018 Löger served as president of the Sports Union. Since 2011 he has been a member of the Vienna state institutions of the People's Party Business Union.

== Political career ==
Löger served as Minister of Finance in the coalition government of Chancellor Sebastian Kurz. He was nominated by the People's Party for this position.

Alongside Gernot Blümel, Günther Helm (Hofer KG) und Wolfgang Leitner, Löger has been serving as member of the nominating committee of the Industrieholding since January 2018. The committee decides who is sent to the supervisory board of companies with state share participation.

== Other activities ==
=== European Union organizations ===
- European Investment Bank (EIB), Ex-Officio Member of the Board of Governors (2018–2019)
- European Stability Mechanism (ESM), Member of the Board of Governors (2018–2019)

=== International organizations ===
- Asian Development Bank (ADB), Ex-Officio Member of the Board of Governors (2018–2019)
- Asian Infrastructure Investment Bank (AIIB), Ex-Officio Member of the Board of Governors (2018–2019)
- European Bank for Reconstruction and Development (EBRD), Ex-Officio Member of the Board of Governors (2018–2019)
- Inter-American Investment Corporation (IIC), Ex-Officio Member of the Board of Governors (2018–2019)
- Multilateral Investment Guarantee Agency (MIGA), World Bank Group, Ex-Officio Member of the Board of Governors (2018–2019
- World Bank, Ex-Officio Member of the Board of Governors (2018–2019)

=== Non-profit organizations ===
- Kunsthistorisches Museum, President of the Circle of Friends
- KURIER Aid Austria, Vice President
- Verband der Versicherungsunternehmen Österreichs (VVO), Vice President

== Personal life ==
Löger is married, has two children and lives in Vienna in Austria.
