= Franz Vranitzky =

Chancellor of Austria from 1986 to 1997

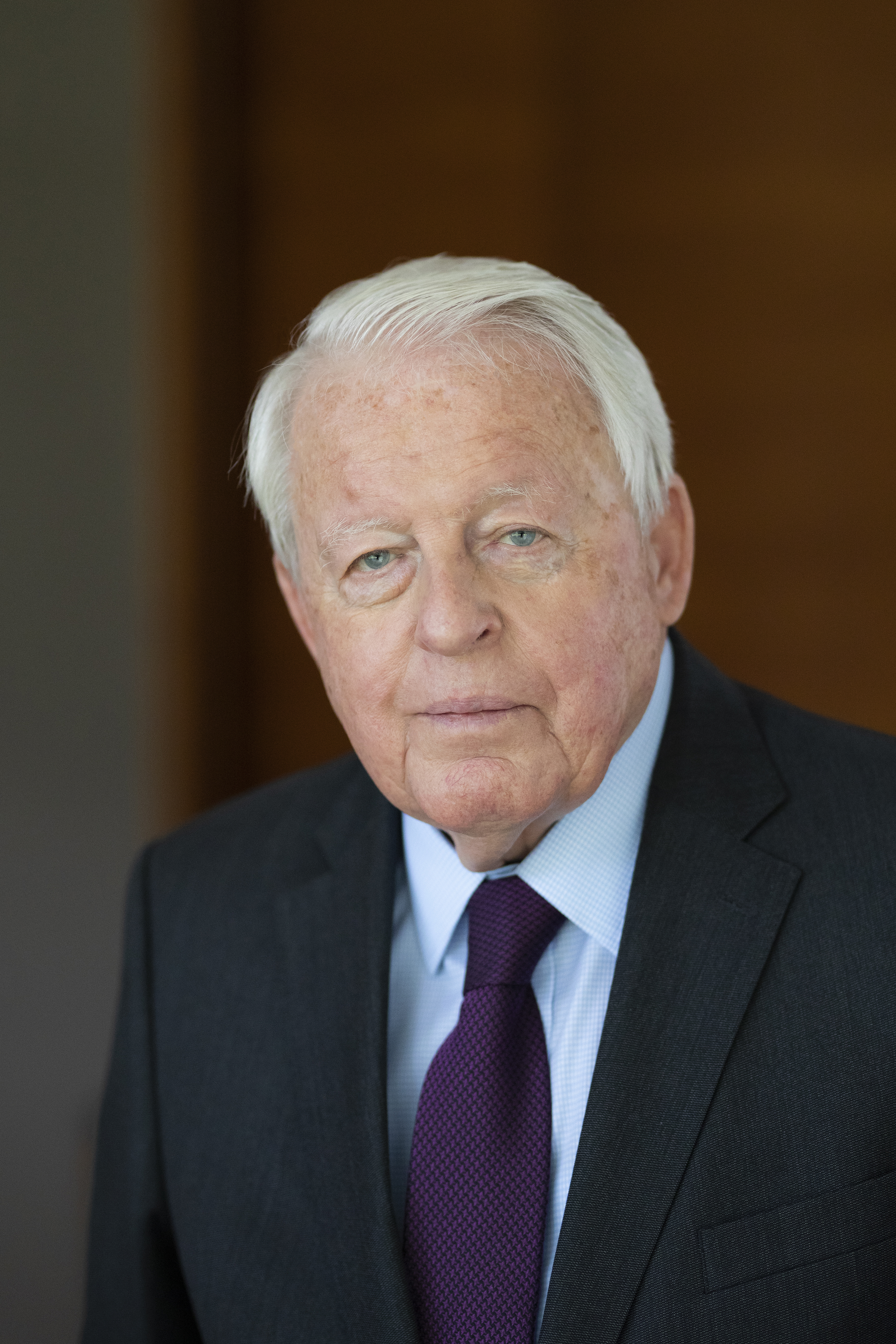
- Vranitzky in 2020

Chancellor of Austria
- In office 16 June 1986 – 28 January 1997
- President: Rudolf Kirchschläger; Kurt Waldheim; Thomas Klestil
- Vice-Chancellor: Norbert Steger; Alois Mock; Josef Riegler; Erhard Busek; Wolfgang Schüssel
- Preceded by: Fred Sinowatz
- Succeeded by: Viktor Klima

Chair of the Social Democratic Party
- In office 11 May 1988 – 9 April 1997
- Preceded by: Fred Sinowatz
- Succeeded by: Viktor Klima

Minister of Finance
- In office 10 September 1984 – 16 June 1986
- Chancellor: Fred Sinowatz
- Preceded by: Herbert Salcher
- Succeeded by: Viktor Klima

Personal details
- Born: 4 October 1937 (age 89) Vienna, Federal State of Austria (now Austria)
- Party: Social Democratic Party
- Spouse: Christine Christen (m. 1962)
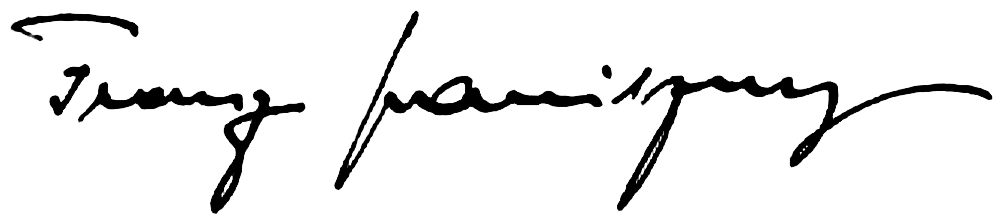
- Signature

Franz Vranitzky (German: [fʁants vʁaˈnɪtski]; born 4 October 1937) is an Austrian politician. A member of the Social Democratic Party of Austria (SPÖ), he was Chancellor of Austria from 1986 to 1997.

== Early life and career ==
As the son of a foundryman, Vranitzky was born into humble circumstances in Vienna's 17th district. He attended the Realgymnasium Geblergasse and studied economics, graduating in 1960. He financed his studies teaching Latin and English and as a construction worker.

As a young man, Vranitzky played basketball and was a member of Austria's national team, which in August 1960 in Bologna unsuccessfully tried to qualify for the 1960 Summer Olympics in Rome.

In 1962, Vranitzky joined the Social Democratic Party of Austria (SPÖ).

In 1962, Vranitzky married Christine Christen, with whom he fathered two children.

Vranitzky began his career in 1961 at Siemens-Schuckert, but within the year switched to Austria’s central bank Oesterreichische Nationalbank. In 1969, he received a doctorate in International business studies. The following year, Hannes Androsch, finance minister under Chancellor Bruno Kreisky, appointed him economic and financial advisor. Vranitzky served as deputy director of the Creditanstalt-Bankverein (1976–1981), briefly as its director general and as director general of the Länderbank (1981–1984).

In 1984, Vranitzky joined the SPÖ-Freedom Party (FPÖ) government coalition under Chancellor Fred Sinowatz as finance minister. He was criticized for receiving multiple compensations from his various functions in government-run businesses.

== Chancellor of Austria ==
In the presidential elections of 1986, Chancellor Sinowatz vociferously opposed Kurt Waldheim, the candidate of the Austrian People's Party (ÖVP) opposition. The former UN Secretary General's campaign for office caused international controversy due to allegations about his role as a German army officer in World War II. When Waldheim was elected on 8 June, Sinowatz resigned from the government, proposing Vranitzky as his successor.

Vranitzky entered his new office on 16 June 1986. At first he continued the government coalition with the Freedom Party. On 13 September 1986, however, radical FPÖ politician Jörg Haider was elected chairman of his party, ousting the moderate vice chancellor Norbert Steger. Vranitzky ended cooperation with his coalition partner and had parliament dissolved.

In the subsequent elections on 23 November 1986, the SPÖ remained the strongest party. In January 1987, Vranitzky formed a government, based on a grand coalition with the second-largest party, the Christian democrat ÖVP, with Alois Mock serving as vice-chancellor and foreign minister. In 1988, Vranitzky also succeeded Fred Sinowatz as chairman of his party.

Until 1992, Austria's foreign policy had to deal with the repercussions of the Waldheim controversy, as the Austrian president was shunned in some diplomatic circles. The United States regarded Waldheim as a persona non grata, thereby barring him from entering the country in 1987, while Israel had recalled its ambassador after Waldheim's election. Vranitzky managed to normalise Austria's relations with both countries and frequently stepped in to perform diplomatic duties commonly assigned to the president.

On 8 July 1991, in a speech in parliament, Vranitzky acknowledged a share in the responsibility for the pain brought, not by Austria as a state, but by citizens of this country, upon other people and peoples", thereby departing from the hitherto official portrayal of Austria as "Hitler's first victim."

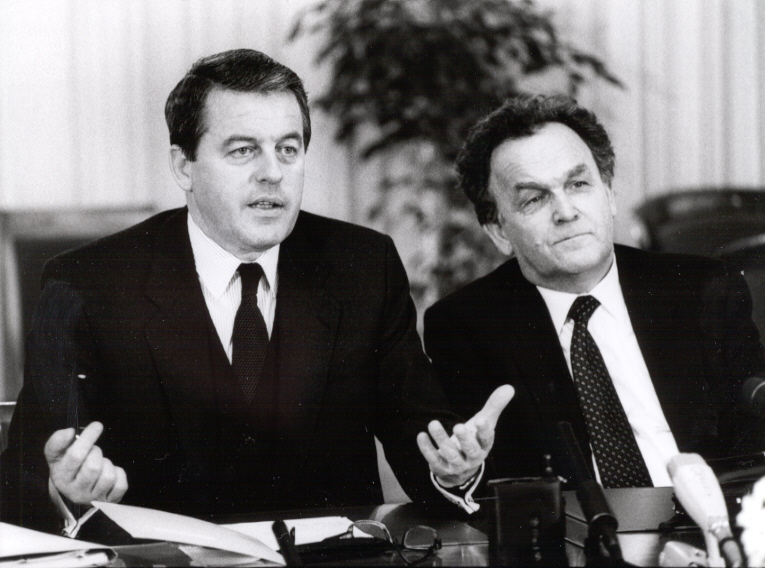
Franz Vranitzky and Otto Stich, 1986

After the end of the Cold War, Vranitzky focused on furthering relations with the nations of Eastern Europe and membership in the European Union, of which Vranitzky and his foreign minister, Alois Mock, were strong advocates. After a referendum on 12 June 1994 resulted in 66% in favour of EU membership, Austria joined the European Union in January 1995. Austria's military neutrality, which had been espoused during the Cold War, was reaffirmed in the process.

In party politics, Vranitzky kept his distance from Jörg Haider's Freedom Party – a stance the latter decried as a "policy of exclusion." In the election of 1990, Vranitzky's coalition government was confirmed when the Social Democrat vote remained stable while the ÖVP lost 17 seats, mainly to the FPÖ. The 1994 election saw heavy losses by both coalition parties, which nonetheless remained the two largest parties, while FPÖ and others made further gains. Vranitzky renewed the coalition with the ÖVP, which after May 1995 was led by foreign minister Wolfgang Schüssel. Later in the year, the grand coalition broke apart over budget policy, leading to the elections of December 1995, which however only saw slight changes in favor of SPÖ and ÖVP. Vranitzky and Schüssel resumed their coalition in March 1996.

In January 1997, Vranitzky resigned as chancellor and as party chairman. He was succeeded in both positions by his minister of finance, Viktor Klima.

== Later activities ==
After leaving office, Vranitzky served as Organization for Security and Co-operation in Europe representative for Albania from March to October 1997, before returning into the banking sector, as political consultant to the WestLB bank. In December, he was elected to the board of governors of automotive supplier Magna. He later occupied the same position for the tourism company TUI and Magic Life hotels.

In June 2005, he donated one of his kidneys to his wife Christine, who suffered from chronic kidney failure.

He actively supported his party's frontrunner Alfred Gusenbauer in the 2006 elections. During the campaign it was revealed, that in 1999, Vranitzky had received a million Austrian schillings as a consultant to the BAWAG bank, which was then under public scrutiny. It was alleged that the payment was made without any service in return and that it constituted an "indirect party funding". Vranitzky denounced the allegations.

Vranitzky chairs the quarterly Vranitzky Colloquia, organised by the study group WiWiPol, which discusses economic topics and their impact on Austria and Europe. He is a former member of the Steering Committee of the Bilderberg Group.

Political offices
Preceded by Herbert Salcher	Finance Minister of Austria; 1984–1986	Succeeded by Ferdinand Lacina
Preceded by Fred Sinowatz	Chancellor of Austria; 1986–1997	Succeeded by Viktor Klima
Party political offices
Preceded by Fred Sinowatz	Chairman of the Social Democratic Party; 1988–1997	Succeeded by Viktor Klima
Awards
Preceded by Gro Harlem Brundtland	Recipient of the Charlemagne Prize; 1995	Succeeded by Beatrix of the Netherlands
