= Johann Koplenig =

Austrian politician (1891–1968)

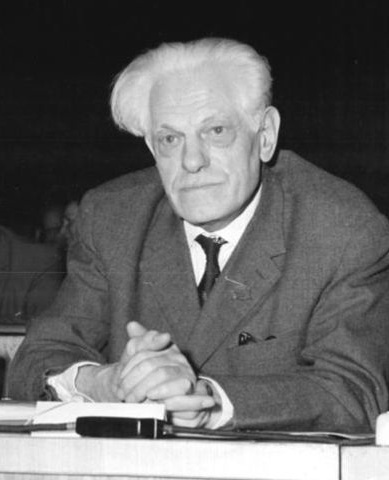

Vice-Chancellor of Austria
- In office 27 April 1945 – 20 December 1945 Serving with Leopold Figl, Adolf Schärf
- Chancellor: Karl Renner
- Preceded by: Edmund Glaise-Horstenau (1938)
- Succeeded by: Adolf Schärf

Personal details
- Born: 15 May 1891 Jadersdorf, Gitschtal, Carinthia, Austria-Hungary
- Died: 13 December 1968 (aged 77) Vienna, Austria
- Resting place: Feuerhalle Simmering, Vienna, Austria
- Party: Communist Party of Austria (1920–)
- Other political affiliations: Social Democratic Party of Austria (1910–1920)
- Spouse: Hilde Koplenig (1904–2002)

Military service
- Allegiance: Austria-Hungary
- Branch/service: Austro-Hungarian Army
- Battles/wars: World War I; Eastern Front

Johann Koplenig (15 May 1891 – 13 December 1968) was an Austrian politician. He was the chairman of the Communist Party of Austria (KPÖ) from 1945 until 1965, and Honorary Chairman of the party from 1965 until his death. In 1945, Koplenig was Vice-Chancellor of Austria in Karl Renner's provisional government.

== Biography ==
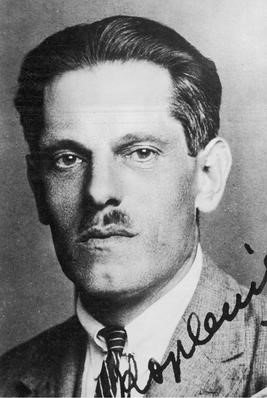
Koplenig in 1931

The son of an agricultural laborer, Koplenig was born in Jadersdorf, a small village near Gitschtal, Carinthia. By profession, he was a shoemaker.

Koplenig aligned himself with the workers' movement as a youth; in 1910, he joined the Social Democratic Workers' Party of Austria (SDAPÖ). During World War I, he fought for Austria-Hungary, but was captured in Russia and made a prisoner of war in 1915. Koplenig carried out work in support of the Bolsheviks at the time of the October Revolution in 1917, and was a member of a Workers' and Soldiers' Council in Nizhny Novgorod from 1918 until 1920, when he returned to Austria.

After his return home, Koplenig became active in the Communist Party of Austria in Styria. In 1922, he was elected to the party's Central Committee, of which he was elected general secretary in 1924. Koplenig was elected a member of the Executive Committee of the Communist International in 1928, and in 1935–1943 he was a member of the committee's Presidium. When the KPÖ was banned by the regime of Engelbert Dollfuss in 1934, Koplenig went underground and continued to work illegally in Austria for a while before fleeing the country. He remained in exile after the Anschluss of Austria into Nazi Germany and the outbreak of World War II, and spent time in Czechoslovakia, France, and the Soviet Union.

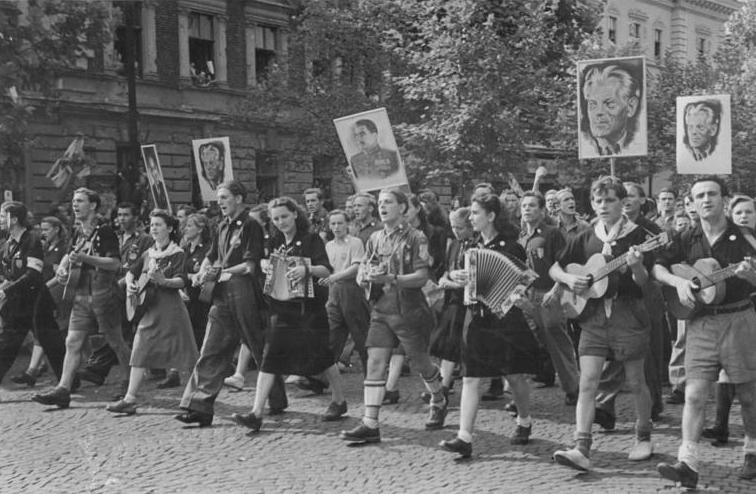
Austrian delegates carrying Koplenig's portraits during the 2nd World Festival of Youth and Students in Budapest, August 1949

Koplenig returned to Austria after the end of the war in 1945, and was made Vice-Chancellor in Karl Renner's provisional government, together with Adolf Schärf and Leopold Figl. The same year, he was elected to the National Council, where he was a deputy until 1959. He was also elected Chairman of the KPÖ, a post he would keep for 20 years before resigning in 1965; however, he retained the post of Honorary chairman until his death.

Koplenig died from cancer in Vienna in 1968. He was cremated at Feuerhalle Simmering, where his ashes are also buried. He was married twice; his first wife, Anna, died in 1921. His second wife, whom he married in 1929, was the historian Hilde Koplenig (née Oppenheim) (1904–2002), daughter of the astronomer Samuel Oppenheim. Johann and Hilde had two children.

A statue of Koplenig is placed in front of the building of Globus-Verlag, the KPÖ's publishing house, in Brigittenau, Vienna.
