= Ferdinand Hanusch =

Austrian politician (1866–1923)

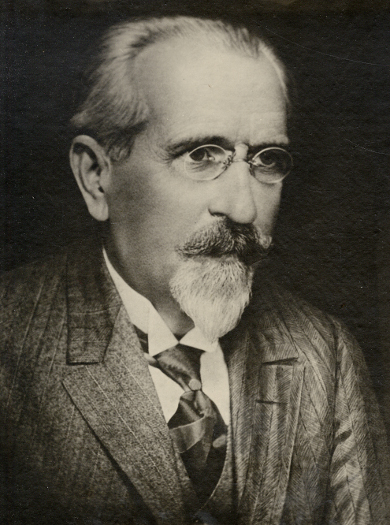
- Hanusch c. 1920

Vice-Chancellor of Austria
- In office 7 July 1920 – 10 November 1920
- Chancellor: Karl Renner
- Preceded by: Jodok Fink
- Succeeded by: Eduard Heinl

Personal details
- Born: 9 November 1866 Wigstadtl Oberdorf, Austrian Silesia, Austrian Empire
- Died: 28 September 1923 (aged 56) Vienna, Republic of Austria
- Party: Social Democratic Workers' Party

Ferdinand Hanusch (9 November 1866 – 28 September 1923) was an Austrian writer and politician (SDAP) who served as the second Vice-Chancellor of Austria from 7 July to 10 November 1920. He is the founder of the Austrian Chamber for Workers and Employees.

== See also ==
- List of members of the Austrian Parliament who died in office
