= Bruno Pittermann =

Austrian politician (1905–1983)

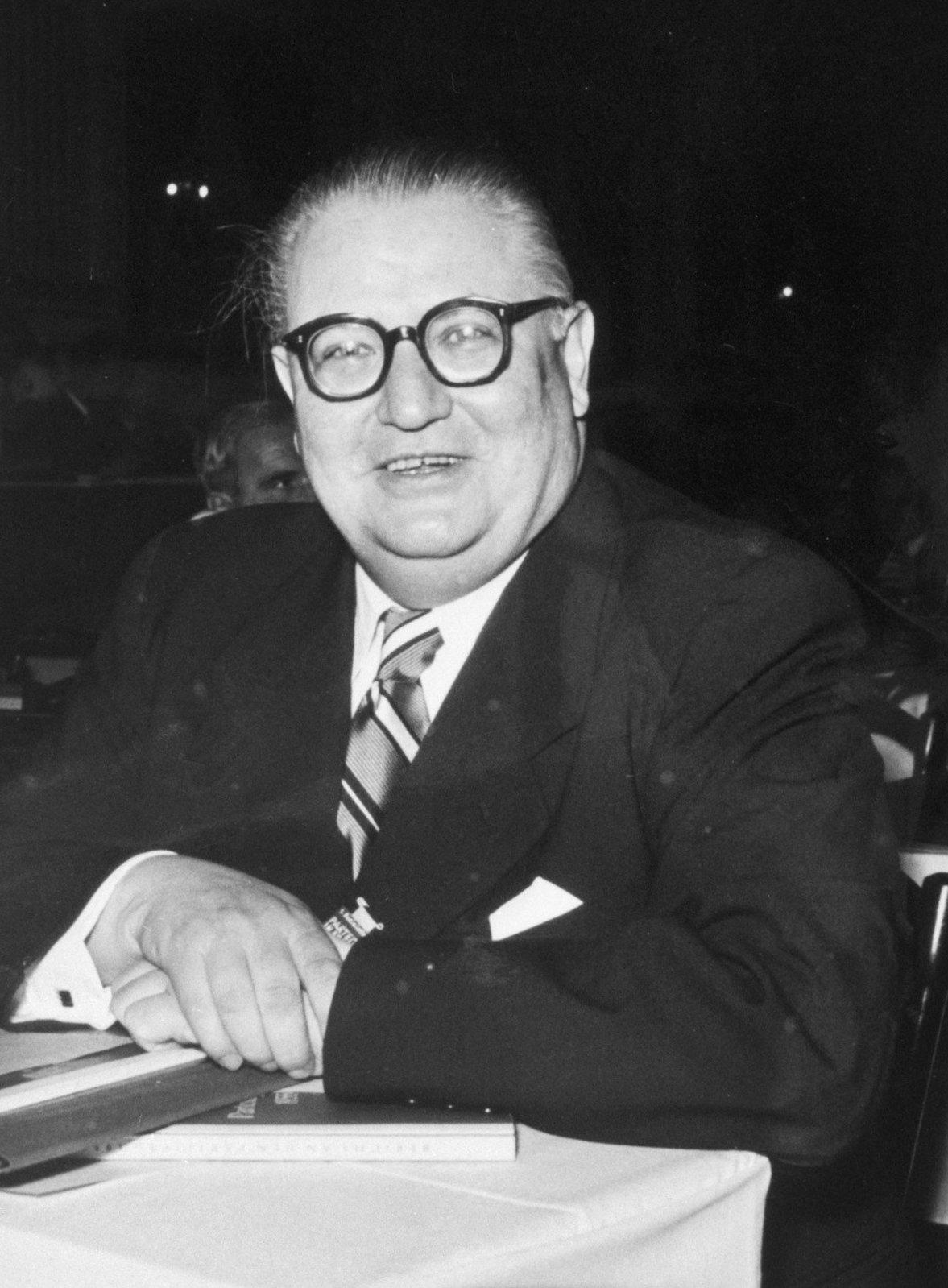
- Pittermann in 1965

Vice-Chancellor of Austria
- In office 22 May 1957 – 19 April 1966
- Chancellor: Julius Raab; Alfons Gorbach; Josef Klaus
- Preceded by: Adolf Schärf
- Succeeded by: Fritz Bock

President of the Socialist International
- In office 5 September 1964 – 26 November 1976
- Preceded by: Erich Ollenhauer
- Succeeded by: Willy Brandt

Minister of Transport
- In office 14 December 1962 – 27 March 1963
- Chancellor: Alfons Gorbach
- Preceded by: Karl Waldbrunner
- Succeeded by: Otto Probst

Chair of the Social Democratic Party
- In office 8 May 1957 – 1 February 1967
- Preceded by: Adolf Schärf
- Succeeded by: Bruno Kreisky

Personal details
- Born: 3 September 1905 Vienna, Austria-Hungary
- Died: 19 September 1983 (aged 78) Vienna, Austria
- Party: Social Democratic Party

Bruno Pittermann (3 September 1905 – 19 September 1983) was an Austrian politician who served as the Vice-Chancellor of Austria from 1957 to 1966. He also served as the president of the Socialist International from 1964 to 1976.

== Early life ==
Pittermann was trained in geography, history, and pedagogy. In his youth, he took a job as an education expert in the Chamber of Labor in Klagenfurt. In 1934, he was fired from his job because of his membership in the Social Democratic Party of Austria. Afterwards, he joined the illegal Revolutionary Socialists of Austria (RSÖ) during the Fatherland Front regime. He worked as a teacher while studying for a doctorate in law. After the annexation of Austria in Nazi Germany in 1938, Pittermann was fired from his teaching position.

== Post-war activities ==
He served as both the chairman of the Social Democratic Party of Austria from 1957 to 1967, and the Vice Chancellor of Austria from 1957 to 1966. In 1966, he resigned as head of the party and was succeeded by Bruno Kreisky. From 1964 to 1976, he was president of the Socialist International.

Party political offices
| Preceded by Adolf Schärf | Chair of the Social Democratic Party of Austria; 1957–1967 | Succeeded by Bruno Kreisky |
| Preceded by Erich Ollenhauer | President of the Socialist International; 1964–1976 | Succeeded by Willy Brandt |
Political offices
| Preceded by Adolf Schärf | Vice-Chancellor of Austria; 1957–1966 | Succeeded by Fritz Bock |
