= Norbert Steger =

Austrian politician (born 1944)

- Steger in 1985

Vice-Chancellor of Austria
- In office 24 May 1983 – 21 January 1987
- Chancellor: Fred Sinowatz; Franz Vranitzky
- Preceded by: Fred Sinowatz
- Succeeded by: Alois Mock

Minister for Trade, Commerce and Industry
- In office 24 May 1983 – 21 January 1987
- Chancellor: Fred Sinowatz; Franz Vranitzky
- Preceded by: Josef Staribacher
- Succeeded by: Robert Graf

Chair of the Freedom Party
- In office 2 March 1980 – 13 September 1986
- Preceded by: Alexander Götz
- Succeeded by: Jörg Haider

Personal details
- Born: Norbert Steger; 6 March 1944 (age 82) Vienna, Ostmark, Nazi Germany
- Party: FPÖ
- Children: Petra Steger

Norbert Steger (born 6 March 1944) is an Austrian lawyer and former politician for the Freedom Party of Austria (FPÖ). He was the FPÖ party leader from 1980 to 1986, and Vice Chancellor from 1983 to 1987 as a member of the party's liberal wing.

Under his leadership of the FPÖ, the party adopted a more liberal program and a less confrontational discourse. He sought to turn the party to become something of an Austrian version of the German Free Democratic Party, focusing on free market and anti-statist policies.

== Political career ==
Norbert Steger was born in Vienna in 1944. He studied law at the University of Vienna and received his doctorate in 1970.

Steger began his career in politics in the Ring of Freedom Party Students (RFS), a student organization aligned with the FPÖ. He was elected deputy chairman of the RFS in 1965. In 1975, he was appointed deputy state party leader of the FPÖ in Vienna and became state party leader in 1977. In 1980, he was elected federal chairman of the FPÖ. Under Steger, who belonged to the economic liberal wing of the party, the FPÖ sought to distance itself from its far-right image.

In the 1983 legislative election, the FPÖ finished third with 4.98% of the vote, an all-time low, behind the Socialist Party (SPÖ) and the People's Party (ÖVP). Despite this result, the FPÖ entered government for the first time after forming a coalition with the SPÖ. Steger served as Vice Chancellor and Minister for Trade, Commerce and Industry in the cabinets of Chancellors Sinowatz and Vranitzky.

In 1986, Steger was ousted from as FPÖ chairman after losing a leadership contest at the party conference in Innsbruck to Jörg Haider, who represented the party's right-wing nationalist faction. The SPÖ subsequently ended the coalition, citing opposition to Haider's leadership, and called a snap election, which resulted in an SPÖ-ÖVP coalition. Steger later retired from politics and left the FPÖ in the 1990s. From 2008 to 2022, Steger was a member of the ORF Foundation Council for the FPÖ, serving as its chair from 2018 to 2022.

== Personal life ==
Steger has two daughters, including Petra Steger, an MEP for the FPÖ.

He claimed that his father had never been a member of the Nazi Party, however, an investigation revealed that he had joined the NSDAP in 1932.

Political offices
Preceded by Fred Sinowatz	Vice Chancellor of Austria; 1983–1987	Succeeded by Alois Mock
Party political offices
Preceded by Alexander Götz	FPÖ Party Chairman; 1980–1986	Succeeded by Jörg Haider
