= Fritz Bock =

Austrian politician

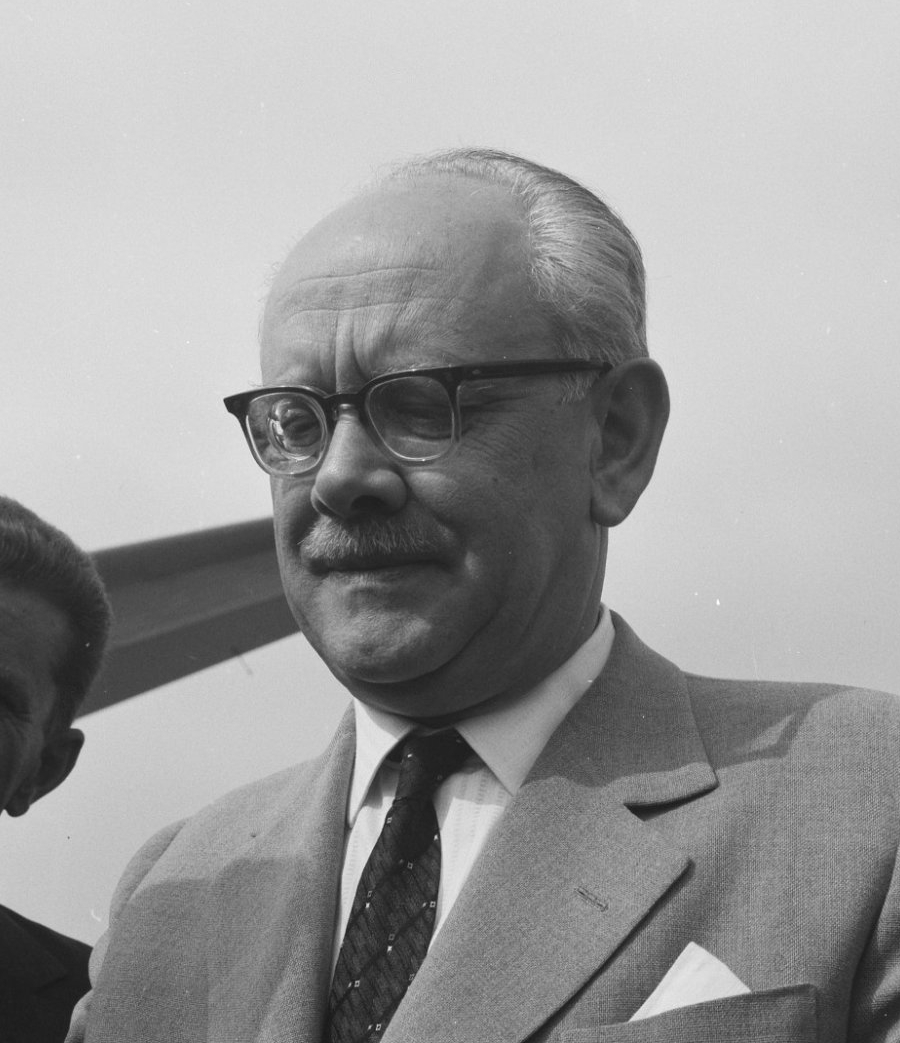

Vice-Chancellor of Austria
- In office 19 April 1966 – 19 January 1968
- Chancellor: Josef Klaus
- Preceded by: Bruno Pittermann
- Succeeded by: Hermann Withalm

Minister of Commerce and Reconstruction
- In office 19 September 1956 – 19 April 1966
- Chancellor: Julius Raab; Alfons Gorbach; Josef Klaus
- Preceded by: Udo Illig
- Succeeded by: Otto Mitterer

Personal details
- Born: 26 February 1911 Vienna, Austria-Hungary
- Died: 12 December 1993 (aged 82) Vienna, Austria
- Party: Austrian People's Party
- Spouse: Anna Dörrich
- Education: University of Vienna

Fritz Bock (26 February 1911 – 12 December 1993) was an Austrian politician notable for having co-founded the Austrian People's Party in 1945 and having been Vice-Chancellor of Austria from 1966 to 1968.

During the dictatorial government of Kurt Schuschnigg, Bock was responsible for anti-Nazi propaganda as propaganda director of the Fatherland Front. He was also involved in organizing the referendum on maintaining Austrian independence. After the annexation of Austria, Bock was arrested on 15 March 1938 and was taken to Dachau concentration camp. However, he was released on health grounds in 1939.

== Honours and awards ==
- Decoration for Services to the Republic of Austria:
  - 1956: Great Gold Decoration with Star
  - 1959: Great Gold Decoration with Ribbon
