= Alois Mock =

Austrian politician (1934–2017)

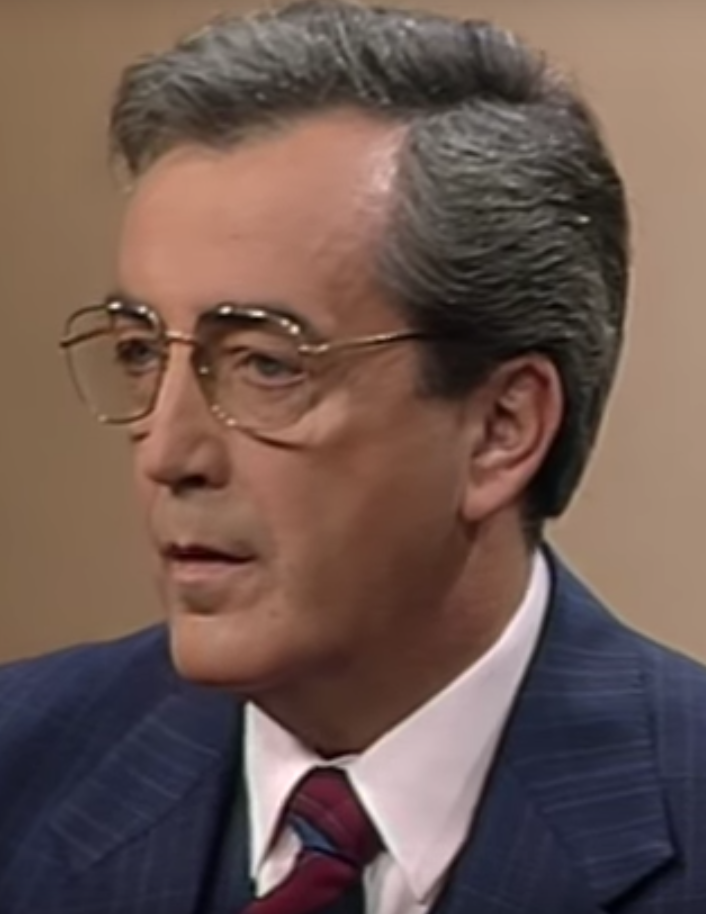
- Alois Mock, speaking in 1986

Vice-Chancellor of Austria
- In office 21 January 1987 – 24 April 1989
- Chancellor: Franz Vranitzky
- Preceded by: Norbert Steger
- Succeeded by: Josef Riegler

Minister of Foreign Affairs
- In office 21 January 1987 – 4 May 1995
- Chancellor: Franz Vranitzky
- Preceded by: Peter Jankowitsch
- Succeeded by: Wolfgang Schüssel

Minister of Education
- In office 2 June 1969 – 21 April 1970
- Chancellor: Josef Klaus
- Preceded by: Theodor Piffl-Percevic
- Succeeded by: Leopold Gratz

Personal details
- Born: 10 June 1934 Euratsfeld, Lower Austria, Austria
- Died: 1 June 2017 (aged 82) Vienna, Austria
- Cause of death: Complications from Parkinson's disease
- Party: Austrian People's Party
- Education: University of Vienna

Alois Mock (German pronunciation: [ˈaːlɔɪs ˈmɔk]; 10 June 1934 – 1 June 2017) was an Austrian politician and member of the Austrian People's Party (ÖVP). He was Vice Chancellor of Austria from 1987 to 1989. As foreign minister, he helped take Austria into the European Union.

== Life ==
Born on 10 June 1934 in Euratsfeld, Lower Austria, to August and Mathilde Mock, he studied law at the University of Vienna and later international law in Bologna and Brussels. In Vienna, he became a member of K.A.V. Norica Wien, a Roman Catholic student fraternity, which is a member of the Cartellverband. From 1961, he advised Austrian chancellor Josef Klaus on European Economic Community and EFTA policies. From 1962 to 1966, he worked at Austria's mission to the OECD in Paris. In 1966, he became Klaus's cabinet secretary. From 1969 to 1970, he was the youngest education minister in Austrian history. Following his tenure in the cabinet, Mock was sworn into the National Council on 4 November 1971. Parliamentary records show that he became an active member of the Foreign Policy Committee, where he began his long-term advocacy for European integration and negotiated policies regarding the European Economic Community (EEC).

After the parliamentary elections 1971 - in which the Social Democratic Party of Austria (SPÖ) under Bruno Kreisky won a majority — he became a member of parliament and mayor of Euratsfeld. From 1971 to 1978, he chaired the ÖAAB, the most important grouping of the ÖVP. From 1978 to 1987, he was the leader of the ÖVP parliamentary group, and from 1979, he also was ÖVP federal party chairman. He was later to be succeeded by Josef Riegler, Erhard Busek and Wolfgang Schüssel. In 1979, Mock became President of the European Democrat Union (EDU); from 1983 to 1987, he was also was president of the International Democratic Union (IDU). At the 1983 elections, the ÖVP obtained nearly the same percentage as Kreisky's SPÖ. Kreisky didn't want to go on without an absolute majority and stepped down.

Following the 1986 elections, Alois Mock was Austrian vice chancellor in the government of Franz Vranitzky (SPÖ) from 1987 to 1989. From 1987 to 1995, he was foreign minister, leading Austria into the European Union. He became one of Austria's most popular politicians. On 27 June 1989, together with his Hungarian colleague Gyula Horn, he cut the wires of the Iron Curtain near Sopron at the fortified border to Communist neighbour Hungary. This symbolic act not only signaled the opening of the border but also paved the way for new economic horizons and the dismantling of trade barriers between Austria and the former Eastern Bloc. In June 1993, Mock served as the Head of the Austrian Delegation at the World Conference on Human Rights held in Vienna, a pivotal event that reaffirmed the international commitment to human rights following the end of the Cold War. His diplomatic influence was further evidenced in late 1993 when he was invited by the French Senate's Foreign Affairs Committee for a high-level hearing regarding European affairs and international relations.As a result, during the following months, thousands of East German citizens were able to exit the Eastern Bloc.

In 1991, he urged Hans-Dietrich Genscher and Helmut Kohl to recognize Croatia and Slovenia as independent states as soon as possible.

In November 1989, Mock was one of the founders of the Central European cooperative Pentagonale, which later grew from 5 countries to 18 of the CEI (Central European Initiative). In 1999, he retired from parliament because of Parkinson's disease. At the time of his death, Mock was a Member of the Advisory Board of the Global Panel Foundation, an NGO that works behind the scenes in crisis areas around the world.

=== Historical Impact ===
The 1989 opening of the border altered Austria's geopolitical position, shifting Vienna from the edge of the Western world back to a central role within Central Europe. This transition facilitated a dynamic expansion of trade relations, through which Austrian industry established a significant economic presence in former Eastern Bloc markets. Decades later, Mock’s diplomatic contribution continues to be noted in international circles; in 2019, the 30th anniversary of the border dismantling was the subject of a diplomatic colloquium in Paris, co-organized by the embassies of Austria, the Czech Republic, and Slovakia to examine the lasting effects of that era.

== Death ==
Mock died on 1 June 2017 from complications of Parkinson's disease at the age of 82.

== Honours and awards ==
- Grand Gold Medal with Ribbon for Services to the Republic of Austria
- Golden Commander's Cross with the Star of Honour for Services to the province of Lower Austria
- Grand Gold Medal of the province of Upper Austria
- Medal of Tyrol
- Large Order Montfort of Vorarlberg
- Carinthian Order in Gold
- Grand Cross of Merit of the Federal Republic of Germany
- Grand Cross of Merit of the Italian Republic (1993)
- Legion of Honour (France)
- Grand Cross of the Order of Orange-Nassau (Netherlands)
- Grand Cross of the Order of Merit of the Principality of Liechtenstein
- Grand Order of King Dmitar Zvonimir (Croatia)
- Order of the Dragon of Bosnia
- Mother Teresa Medal (Albania)
- Grand Cross of Merit of the Republic of Cyprus
- Order of Merit of the Republic of Poland
- Order of Stara Planina, 1st class (Bulgaria)
- Order of the Star of Jordan (Jordan)
- Grand Officer's Cross of the Order of Umayyad Syria
- Order of Diplomatic Service Merit Gwanghwa Medal (South Korea)
- Grand Cross of the Order of Bernardo O'Higgins (Chile)
- Grand Cross of the Order of the Liberator San Martin (Argentina)
- Star of Mahaputera, 2nd class (Indonesia)
- Order of the Rising Sun (Japan)
- Grand Cross of the Order of St. Gregory
- Grand Commander of the Order of the Star of Romania
- Grand Order of Merit of South Tyrol
- Peace Connection Mostar (Bosnia-Herzegovina)
- Commander's Cross with the Star of Order of Merit of the Republic of Hungary
- Great merit of the Province of South Tyrol (Alto Adige)
- National Order of faithful service in the rank of Commander (Romania)

Political offices
Preceded by: Josef Taus	Chair of the Austrian People's Party; 1979–1989	Josef Riegler
Preceded by: Norbert Steger	Vice-Chancellor of Austria; 1987–1989	Josef Riegler
Preceded by: Peter Jankowitsch	Minister of Foreign Affairs; 1987–1995	Succeeded by: Wolfgang Schüssel
