= Eduard Heinl =

Austrian politician (1880–1957)

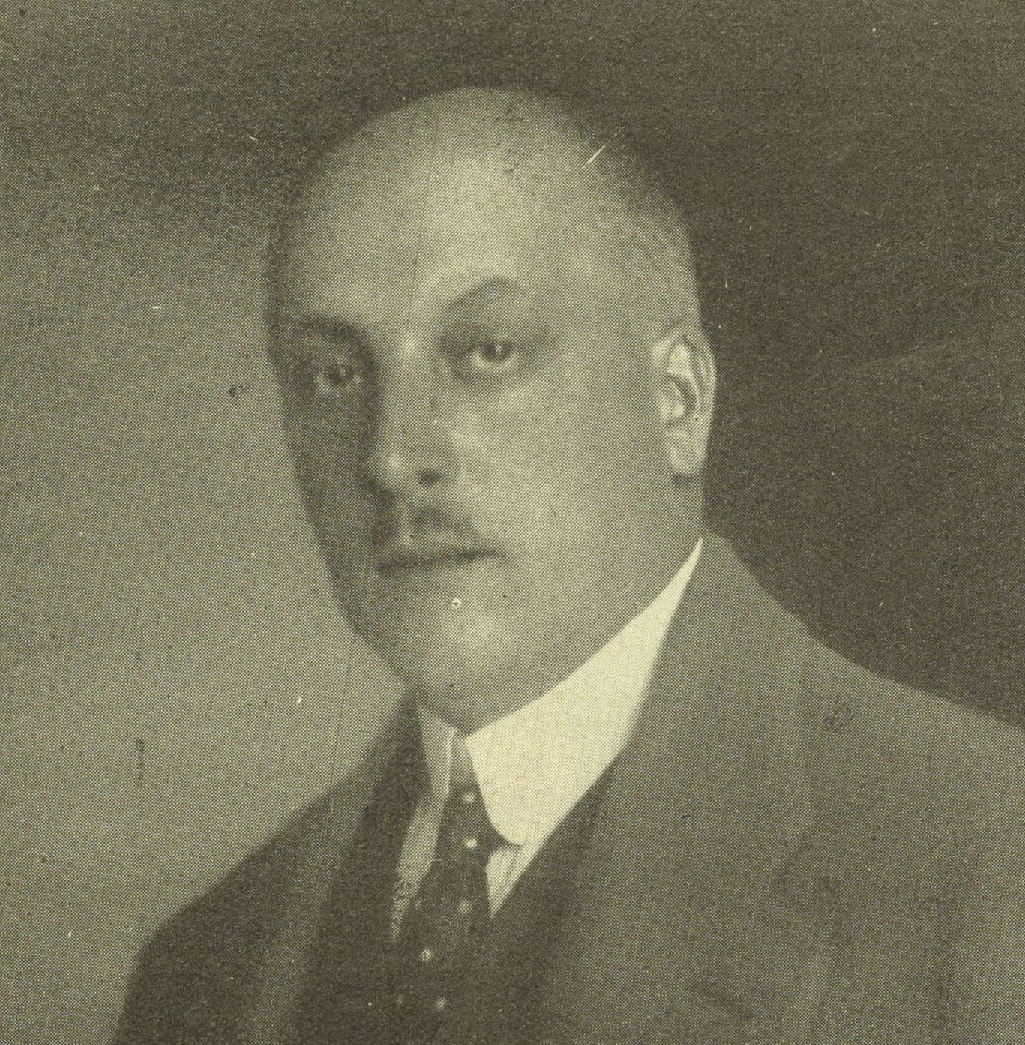
- Heinl in 1927

Vice-Chancellor of Austria
- In office 10 November 1920 – 20 November 1920
- Chancellor: Michael Mayr
- Preceded by: Ferdinand Hanusch
- Succeeded by: Walter Breisky

Personal details
- Political party: Christian Social Party; Austrian People's Party

Eduard Heinl (9 April 1880 – 10 April 1957) was an Austrian politician who served as the third Vice-Chancellor of Austria from 10 November to 20 November 1920. Heinl was a member of the Christian Social Party until joining the Austrian People's Party after World War II.
