= Clemens Jabloner =

Austrian jurist

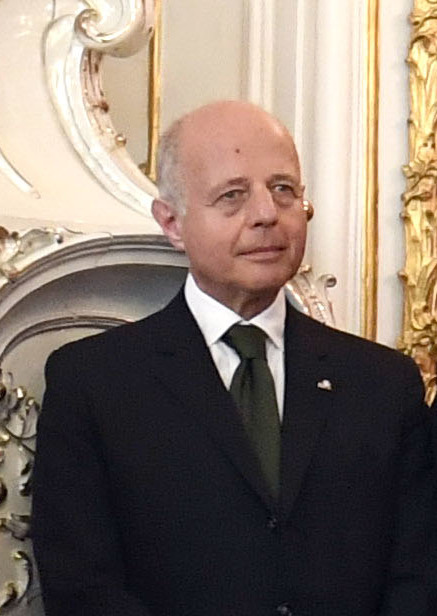
- Jabloner in 2019

Vice-Chancellor of Austria
- In office 3 June 2019 – 1 October 2019
- Chancellor: Brigitte Bierlein
- Preceded by: Hartwig Löger
- Succeeded by: Werner Kogler (2020)

Minister of Justice
- In office 3 June 2019 – 7 January 2020
- Chancellor: Brigitte Bierlein
- Preceded by: Josef Moser
- Succeeded by: Alma Zadić

Personal details
- Born: 28 November 1948 (age 77) Vienna, Austria
- Party: Independent
- Education: University of Vienna

Clemens Jabloner (born 28 November 1948) is an Austrian jurist who served as Vice-Chancellor of Austria and Minister of Justice in the Bierlein government from 2019 to 2020. He previously served as president of the Supreme Administrative Court of Austria from 1993 to 2013 and was a professor of jurisprudence at the University of Vienna.
