= Politics of Austria =

Political System of Austria Politisches System Österreichs
- Coat of arms of Austria
- Polity type: Federal semi-presidential republic
- Constitution: Constitution of Austria

Legislative branch
- Name: Parliament
- Type: Bicameral
- Meeting place: Parliament Building
- Upper house
- Name: Federal Council
- Presiding officer: Markus Stotter, President of the Federal Council
- Appointer: Indirect elections
- Lower house
- Name: National Council
- Presiding officer: Walter Rosenkranz, President of the National Council
- Appointer: Popular vote

Executive branch
- Head of state
- Title: President
- Currently: Alexander van der Bellen
- Appointer: Direct popular vote
- Head of government
- Title: Chancellor
- Currently: Christian Stocker
- Appointer: President
- Cabinet
- Name: Cabinet of Austria
- Current cabinet: Stocker government
- Leader: Chancellor
- Deputy leader: Vice Chancellor
- Appointer: President
- Headquarters: Chancellery building
- Ministries: 14

Judicial branch
- Name: Judiciary of Austria
- Constitutional Court
- Chief judge: Christoph Grabenwarter
- Seat: Seat of the Constitutional Court
- Supreme Court of Justice
- Chief judge: Georg Kodek
- Seat: Palace of Justice
- Supreme Administrative Court
- Chief judge: Rudolf Thienel
- Seat: Seat of the Supreme Administrative Court

Politics in Austria reflects the dynamics of competition among multiple political parties, Currently, the country is governed by President Alexander Van der Bellen who became president after the 2016 Austrian presidential election and Stocker government, formed following the elections of 29 September 2024.

Austrian politics takes place within the constitutional framework of a federal semi-presidential republic, with a President (Bundespräsident) serving as head of state and a Chancellor (Bundeskanzler) as head of government. Governments, both local and federal, exercise executive power. Federal legislative power is vested both in the Federal Government and in the two chambers of Parliament; the National Council (Nationalrat) and the Federal Council (Bundesrat). The Judiciary of Austria is independent of the executive and legislative branches of government.

Following the end the Second World War and re-establishment of Austria as a sovereign state, the conservative Austrian People's Party (ÖVP) and the centre-left Social Democratic Party of Austria (SPÖ) dominated politics and public life for decades, with only one additional party—the FPÖ—playing a significant role at the national level. More recently, the pattern of two-party dominance withered with the rise of newer parties, such as the Greens and the NEOS.

The ethnically and culturally heterogeneous nation-state of Austria is one of the many remnant states of Austria-Hungary, a vast multinational empire that ceased to exist in 1918. The Austrian Republic was preceded by a constitutional monarchy, whose legislative body was elected by, as The New York Times put it, "quasi-universal (male) suffrage" for the first time in 1897.

Austria's first attempt at republican governance after the fall of the monarchy in 1918 was severely hampered by the crippling economic burden of war reparations required by the victorious Allies. Austria's First Republic (1918–1938) made some pioneering reforms in the 1920s, particularly in Vienna, that served as models for the social-welfare states of post-World War I Europe. However, the Republic gradually developed into the Austrofascist dictatorship between 1933 and 1934 under Chancellor Engelbert Dollfuss, who was assassinated by Nazi party agents in 1934. The First Republic ended with the Anschluss (annexation) to Nazi Germany in 1938. Following the defeat of the German Reich in 1945 Austria resumed its republican government, after it fully regained its independence from the occupying Allied Powers. Austria's political system after re-establishment of democracy and self-determination is referred to as the Second Republic.

The beginning of the 21st century marked, for Austria, a half-century of a stable government under a constitutional federal republican system. It is governed according to the principles of representative democracy and the rule of law. The constitutional framework of the politics of Austria and the marrow of the constitution's practical implementation are widely agreed to be robust and adequately conducive to peaceful change.

Austria was the 35th most electoral democratic country in the world in 2023 according to the V-Dem Democracy indices.

== Constitution ==
Austria's constitution characterizes the republic as a federation consisting of nine autonomous federal states (Bundesländer). Both the federation and all its states have written constitutions defining them as republican entities governed according to the principles of representative democracy. Aside from the fact that the states of Austria lack an independent judiciary on the one hand and that their autonomy is largely notional on the other hand, Austria's government structure resembles that of larger federal republics such as Germany.

== Executive branch ==
Main office-holders
Office	Name	Party	Since
President	Alexander Van der Bellen	The Greens	26 January 2017
Chancellor	Christian Stocker	ÖVP	3 March 2025
Vice-Chancellor	Andreas Babler	SPÖ	3 March 2025

=== Head of State ===
Austria's head of state is the Federal President (Bundespräsident), elected by popular vote for a term of six years and limited to two consecutive terms of office. Former president Heinz Fischer was elected for a second term on 25 April 2010. He was succeeded by President Alexander Van der Bellen, who was elected on 4 December 2016. The office of the Federal President is largely ceremonial, although the constitution allows the president to dismiss the cabinet as a whole or to dissolve the National Council and call new elections.

=== Head of Government ===
The Federal Chancellor (Bundeskanzler) is appointed by the Federal President. Although he is head of government, he has no power to direct other members of the government. Following the Ibiza affair, on 30 May 2019, President Van der Bellen appointed President of the Constitutional Court Brigitte Bierlein to serve as Federal Chancellor of a technocratic interim government until the formation and installation of a new political government following the parliamentary elections to be held later that year.

=== Government ===
The federal cabinet consists of the Federal Chancellor appointed by the president and a number of ministers appointed by the president on the recommendation of the chancellor. The federal cabinet answers to the National Council and can be forced to resign through a motion of no confidence.

Brigitte Bierlein's cabinet consisted of top civil servants (Spitzenbeamten) (Note: A Spitzenbeamter is the top civil servant in a department, cf. Permanent Secretaries in British politics) and current and retired jurors. Clemens Jabloner was Vice-chancellor.

Based on the results of the 29 September 2019 National Council elections, in which the ÖVP emerged as the strongest party, the president asked Sebastian Kurz to form a new coalition government. Van der Bellen, formerly a leader of the Green Party, expressed the wish for high inclusion of women in the new cabinet. Women had parity in the caretaker government.

== Legislative branch ==
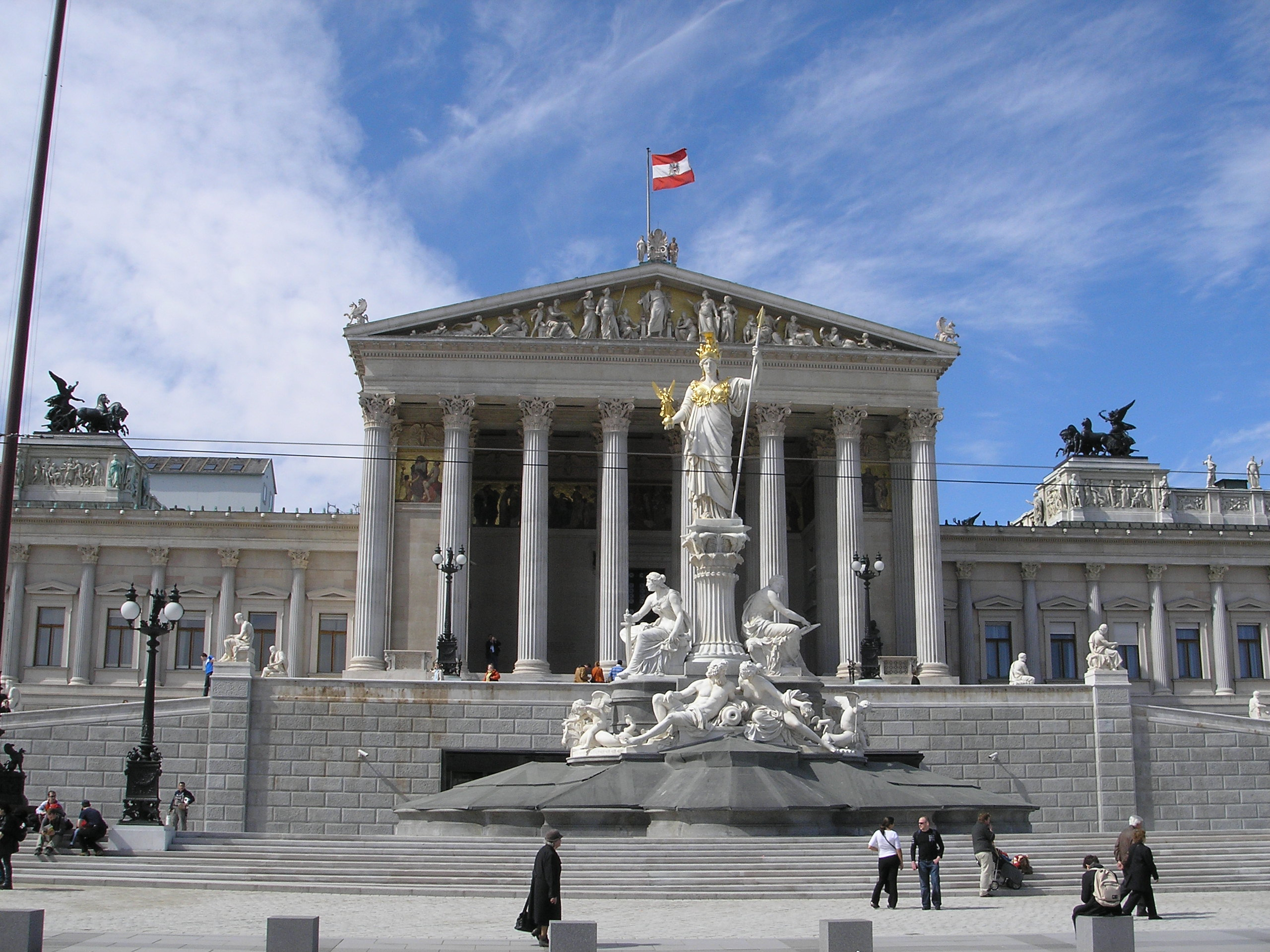
The Austrian Parliament building in Vienna

The Parliament of Austria (Parlament) consists of two chambers. The National Council (Nationalrat) has 183 members, elected for a five-year term by proportional representation. It is the predominant one of the two chambers.

To be represented in the National Council, a party needs to either win at least four percent of votes across the nation or win a seat (Direktmandat) in one of the 43 regional constituencies.

The Federal Council (Bundesrat) consists of 60 members and is less powerful. Its members are selected by the state legislatures (Landtage). The apportionment of seats to the individual states is recalculated after each census. The power of the Federal Council is rather limited. In most cases it has only a suspensive veto, which can be overruled by the National Council. In some situations, however, such as for example legislation that imposes limits on the competences of the provinces, Federal Council approval is required.

The Federal Assembly (Bundesversammlung), which is formed by National Council and Federal Council in joint session, is largely a ceremonial institution. Its main responsibility is the swearing-in of the Federal President. It can also call a referendum on the removal of the president from office or bring the president before the Constitutional Court if it concludes that the president violated the constitution, and is ultimately responsible for declaring war.

Following the accession to the European Union, Austria's parliament had to cede some of its power to European Union institutions.

A convention, the Austrian Convention (Österreich Konvent), was established in 2003 to develop proposals for a reform of the Austrian constitution and central government institutions. It presented a report in 2007, with some of its proposals adopted by parliament.

== Direct democracy ==
Austria's legal system distinguished between three different instruments of direct democracy: referendums (Volksabstimmungen), popular initiatives (Volksbegehren) and national opinion polls (Volksbefragungen).

A referendum on a bill is to be held if a majority of the National Council's members demand it or by a resolution of the President, which has to be counter-signed by all members of government. Also, substantial changes to the constitution always require a referendum, while changes to parts of the constitution only require a referendum if at least one third of the members of the National Council or if the Federal Council demands it. The result of a referendum is binding and the bill in question is not passed into law if a majority votes against it. Until now there have been two referendums in Austria, the most recent being on its entry into the European Union.

Popular initiatives can start a legislative process: if a popular initiative is signed by at least 100,000 registered voters, the National Council has to consider it. It takes precedence over all other matters on the National Council's agenda. As of 2010, 32 initiatives have taken place since their introduction in 1963.

National opinion polls or consultative referendums are held, unlike referendums, before the National Council passes a law. Its results are not legally binding. As of 2015, there has only been one national opinion poll.

== Political parties ==
=== Austrian People's Party ===
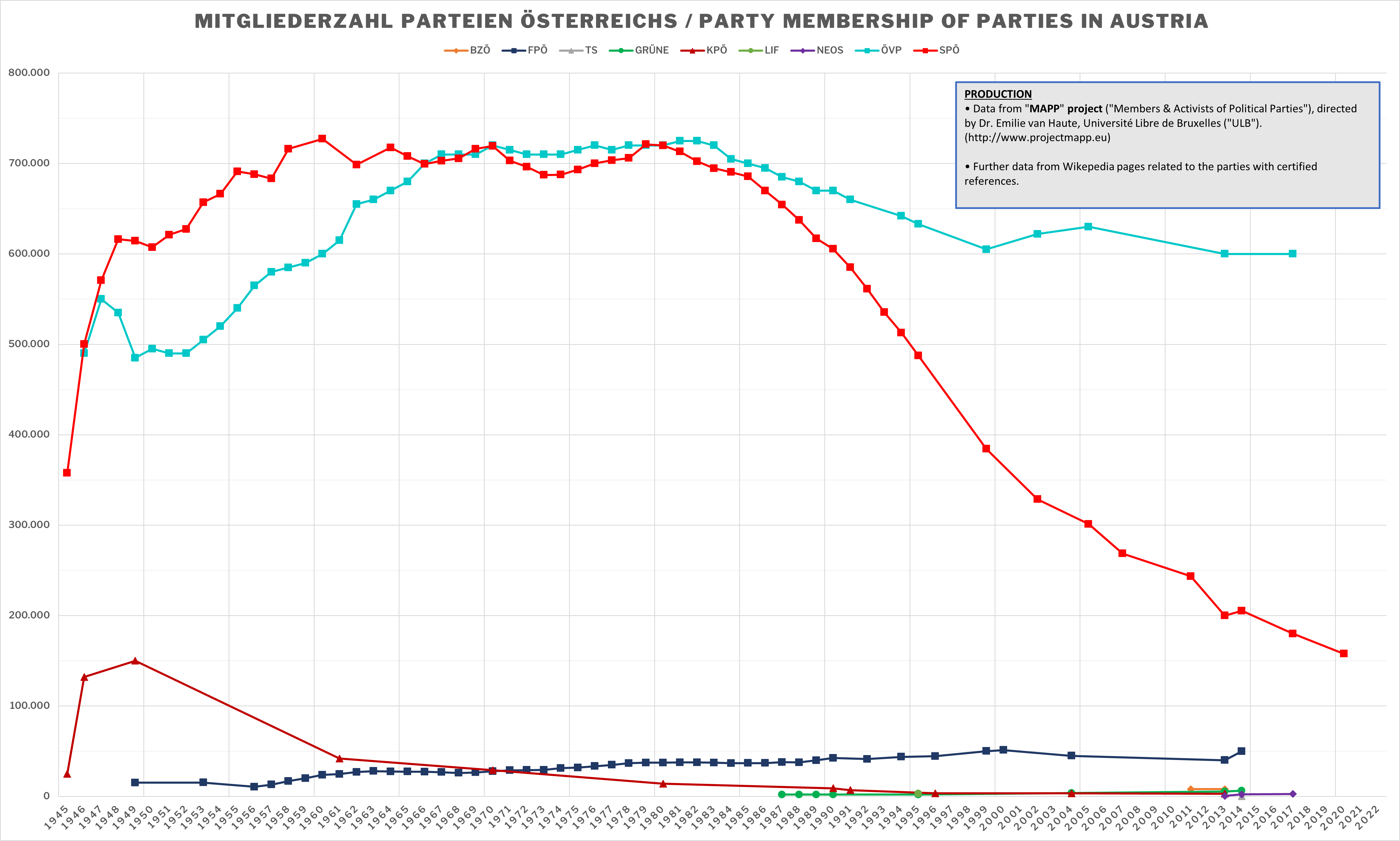
Party membership of parties in Austria, since 1945

The People's Party (Österreichische Volkspartei, or ÖVP, since rebranded Die Neue Volkspartei) was founded by leaders of the former Christian Social Party in 1945 as a conservative/Centre-right party with loose ties to the Catholic Church. Between 1945 and 1970 it provided the Chancellor of Austria and since 1987 it has continuously been in government, its leader Wolfgang Schüssel serving as Chancellor between 2000 and 2007. It finds support from farmers, large and small business owners, and lay Catholic groups, but also from voters without party affiliation, with strongholds in the rural regions of Austria. In the nationwide elections in 2008 it finished second with 26% of the vote, the worst result in the party's history. Since 1991 the party is a member of the European People's Party.

After the collapse of the ÖVP-led coalition government with the FPÖ, the ÖVP performed well in the snap elections held on 29 September 2019, gaining 9 additional seats, while support for the FPÖ dropped sharply, resulting in a loss of 20 seats. The President of Austria accordingly asked ÖVP leader Sebastian Kurz to commence coalition talks to form a new government.

A few days later, Kurz formed his second ruling coalition between his conservative ÖVP party and the Greens. In July 2020, the coalition set up its new center to deal with "political Islam" and its "dangerous ideology."

=== Social Democratic Party of Austria ===
The Social Democratic Party (Sozialdemokratische Partei Österreichs, or SPÖ) is a social democratic/centre-left political party that was founded in 1888 as the Social Democratic Worker's Party (Sozialdemokratische Arbeiterpartei, or SDAP), when Victor Adler managed to unite the various opposing factions. The party was reconstituted as the Socialist Party of Austria in 1945 (renamed to the Social Democratic Party of Austria in 1991) after being outlawed in 1934. Between 1970 and 1999, it governed the country either alone or with a junior partner, and all but three of the Presidents of Austria since 1945 have either been members of the SPÖ or nominated by it. Originally having a high following among blue-collar workers, it sought to expand its focus on middle class and white-collar workers in the late 1950s. In the 1990s, it started viewing privatisation of nationalised industries more openly, after large losses of state owned enterprises came to light. Following the 2008 financial crisis, the party started advocating a global transaction tax. It finished first in the National Council election of 2008 with 29.3% of the vote. The party is a member of the Socialist International and the Party of European Socialists.

Unlike the ÖVP, the SPÖ has been less successful in reinventing itself and adopting to a new political landscape. It suffered heavy losses in the 2019 National Council elections, ending up with a dozen seats fewer than in the previous legislative session. The party intended to rebuild and serve as opposition to the ÖVP-led coalition government under Kurz.

In January 2020 the SPÖ received almost 50% of the votes in regional elections in the State of Burgenland under the leadership of Hans Peter Doskozil, which gave him an absolute majority of seats in the Landtag, and allows him to govern without the support of a junior coalition partner. This surprising success raised the possibility that the SPÖ could reverse recent setbacks at the national level.

=== Freedom Party of Austria ===
The Freedom Party (Freiheitliche Partei Österreichs, or FPÖ) is a right-wing populist political party that was founded in 1955 as a successor to the Federation of Independents. According to polls, it mainly attracts votes from young people and workers. Their nationalist rhetoric targets Muslims, immigrants and the European Union. The party steadily gained support after Jörg Haider took over leadership of the party in 1986, until it attracted about 27% of the vote in the 1999 elections. After being reduced to 10% in the 2002 elections, they achieved 17.5% in 2008.

Thanks to their strong performance in the 2017 national elections, the FPÖ became the junior partner in a government led by the ÖVP under Sebastian Kurz as Chancellor, but the government was ousted through a vote of no confidence as a result of a political scandal involving the FPÖ's leader, dubbed the Ibiza affair. The FPÖ suffered punishing losses in subsequent federal and state elections. It expelled its longtime leader H-C Strache, who set up his own party to run in the 2020 Vienna local elections, but failed to reach the 5% threshold to sit in the city parliament.

=== The Greens - The Green Alternative ===
The Greens (Die Grünen), a party focusing on environmental and social justice issues as part of the worldwide Green movement, received 10.4% of the vote in 2008. They are particularly strong in the city areas, for example in Vienna, where they received 22% of the votes in the 2004 EU-elections. In Neubau they received 41% of the votes, more than SPÖ and ÖVP combined. The Greens attract left-liberal intellectuals and voters from 18 to 30. Somecharacterise the Greens as leftists because they are perceived to be anti-capitalist and employ anti-corporate rhetoric and less business-friendly policies. However, this labeling confuses the differences between the Greens—who place a great deal of faith in local markets and direct democracy—and left-Socialists and Communists who tend to favor centralization and planned economies and economic class issues.

The Green Party suffered internal strife and fissure in 2017 and failed to surmount the 4% threshold in the national elections held that year. It thus lost all of its seats in the National Council, but made a comeback in snap elections of September 2019, with a vote share of 13.9% and 25 seats. Their strong showing, combined with the steep losses of the scandal-ridden FPÖ, made them a possible coalition partner for the People's Party, which had won the largest number of votes and seats of all parties with Sebastian Kurz as its candidate to become Chancellor of Austria for the second time. Following two months of intense negotiations, Kurz and Green Party leader Werner Kogler announced a coalition agreement on New Year's Day 2020. The new cabinet was sworn in by President Van der Bellen a week later.

=== NEOS – The New Austria and Liberal Forum ===
The Liberal Forum (Liberales Forum, or LIF), founded on libertarian ideals, split from the FPÖ in February 1993. It received 3.65% of the vote in the 1999 election and thus failed to pass the 4% threshold necessary for representation in the lower house of parliament (Nationalrat). After being reduced to under 1% in the 2002 election, they disappeared almost completely from public view, receiving 2.1% of the votes in 2008. In 2013 the LIF made a party alliance with the classic-centre liberal NEOS for the legislative election and entered into the National Council. In 2014, the parties merged.

The NEOS achieved their best result ever in the 2019 National Council elections, with 8.1% of the votes and 15 seats, a gain of five seats over the previous elections in 2017, but this number was insufficient to qualify them as a viable junior coalition party with the leading ÖVP.

== Elections ==
Summary of the 2019 Austrian legislative election results

Party	Votes	%	Seats	+/–
Austrian People's Party	1,789,417	37.5	71	+9
Social Democratic Party of Austria	1,011,868	21.2	40	–12
Freedom Party of Austria	772,666	16.2	31	–20
The Greens – The Green Alternative	664,055	13.9	26	+26
NEOS – The New Austria and Liberal Forum	387,124	8.1	15	+5
JETZT	89,169	1.9	0	–8
Communist Party of Austria Plus	32,736	0.7	0	0
Der Wandel	22,168	0.5	0	New
The Beer Party	4,946	0.1	0	New
Every Vote Counts!	1,767	0.0	0	0
BZÖ Carinthia – Alliance of Patriots	760	0.0	0	New
Socialist Left Party	310	0.0	0	0
Christian Party of Austria	260	0.0	0	0
Invalid/blank votes	58,223	–	–	–
Total	4,835,469	100	183	0
Registered voters/turnout	6,396,802	75.6	–	–
Source: Austrian Interior Ministry

See: 2017 Austrian legislative election and 2019 Austrian legislative election

== Political conditions ==
Since World War II, Austria has enjoyed political stability. A Socialist elder statesman, Dr. Karl Renner, organized an Austrian administration in the aftermath of the war, and general elections were held in November 1945. In that election, the conservative People's Party (ÖVP) obtained 50% of the vote (85 seats) in the National Council, the Socialists won 45% (76 seats), and the communists won 5% (4 seats). The ensuing three-party government ruled until 1947, when the communists left the government and the ÖVP led a governing coalition with the socialists that governed until 1966. In that year, the ÖVP won an absolute majority and ruled alone for the next four years. The tables turned in 1970, when the SPÖ became the strongest party for the first time, winning an absolute majority under its charismatic leader Bruno Kreisky in 1971. Between 1971 and 1999, the SPÖ ruled the country either alone or in conjunction with the ÖVP, except from 1983 to 1986, when it governed in coalition with the Freedom Party, until the coalition broke when the right-wing politician Jörg Haider became the leader of the Freedom Party.

After the election of 1999, despite emerging only in third place after the elections, the ÖVP formed a coalition with the right wing-populist Freedom Party (FPÖ) in early 2000. The SPÖ, which was the strongest party in the 1999 elections, and the Greens now form the opposition. As a result of the inclusion of the FPÖ on the government, the EU imposed symbolic sanctions on Austria, which were revoked six months later. The USA and Israel, as well as various other countries, also reduced contacts with the Austrian Government. The ÖVP was re-elected, this time with a plurality of votes, in the 2002 elections, and formed another coalition government with the FPÖ, this time largely ignored by other countries.

After major disputes inside the FPÖ between Haider and vice-chancellor Susanne Riess-Passer (the so-called Knittelfeld Putsch), the ÖVP broke the coalition in 2002 and called for re-elections. Riess-Passer left the FPÖ, and the former Minister of Social Services, Herbert Haupt, was appointed as new leader. In a brilliant marketing move, Chancellor Wolfgang Schüssel convinced the then very popular Minister of Finance Karl-Heinz Grasser to change from the FPÖ to the ÖVP.

Not only was the FPÖ publicly blamed for breaking the coalition and had lost Minister Grasser to the ÖVP, their style of government and broken promises also left many of their former voters disillusioned. In the elections, which were held on 24 November 2002, they suffered the biggest loss of votes in Austria's history, going down from 27% to only 10%. Most of these losses went to the ÖVP, which went up from 26% to 42%, the highest value for decades. Both Greens and Social Democrats gained votes, but not enough to form a coalition with only 85 of 183 seats.

Against public opinion, which was in favour of an ÖVP-SPÖ coalition government, Chancellor Schüssel renewed the coalition between the ÖVP and FPÖ.

Despite being exposed to fierce criticism from the opposition parties for failed or highly unfavorable privatization deals, the highest tax rates and unemployment figures since 1945, a questionable fighter jet purchase and repeated accusations that Finance Minister Grasser may have evaded taxes, the government seems to be the most stable in decades as both parties are afraid of losing votes. Recent law changes concerning the police, the national television and radio company, the federal railways and the social security system have led to an increase of the ÖVP's and FPÖ's influence in these bodies.

The Social Democratic Party of Austria emerged as the strongest party in the 2006 elections forming a government with the Austrian People's Party, SPÖ party leader Alfred Gusenbauer becoming the new Chancellor.

The Social Democratic Party under Alfred Gusenbauer emerged as the winner of Austria's general election in October 2006. After negotiations with the ÖVP were successfully concluded Alfred Gusenbauer and his SPÖ-ÖVP coalition government were sworn in on 11 January 2007, by President Heinz Fischer.

This coalition broke up again in June 2008. Elections in September 2008 further weakened both major parties, Social Democrats and People's Party, but together they still hold more than 50% of the votes with the Social Democrats holding the majority. The Freedom Party and the recently deceased Jörg Haider's new party Alliance for the Future of Austria, both right-wing parties, were strengthened. Due to the surge of the right at the last elections, many speculated that any government coalition would include at least one of the two far-right parties. This idea was put to rest when both the Social Democrats and the People's Party stated that neither of them would work with the Freedom Party or the Alliance for the Future of Austria. Lengthy negotiations led to a renewed "grand coalition" consisting of the Social Democrats and the People's Party. Thus A snap election in 2008 saw both government parties losing votes, however, the coalition between SPÖ and ÖVP was renewed, with Werner Faymann, the new leader of the SPÖ, following Alfred Gusenbauer as Chancellor.

On 17 May 2016, Christian Kern from Social Democrats (SPÖ) was sworn in as new chancellor. He continued governing in a "grand coalition" with the conservative People's Party (ÖVP). He took the office after former chancellor, also from SPÖ, Werner Faymann's resignation.

The Austrian People's Party and The Greens – The Green Alternative formed a coalition government on 1 January 2020, marking the first time the Greens have gained power. A week later, Austria's first female-majority cabinet was sworn in and Chancellor Sebastian Kurz, 33, reclaimed the distinction of being the world's youngest head of government.

On 11 October 2021, Chancellor Sebastian Kurz resigned, after pressure triggered by a corruption scandal. Foreign Minister Alexander Schallenberg of ÖVP succeeded him as chancellor. Following a corruption scandal involving the ruling People's Party, Austria got its third conservative chancellor in two months after Karl Nehammer was sworn into office on 6 December 2021. His predecessor Alexander Schallenberg had left the office after less than two months. ÖVP and the Greens continued to govern together.

== Political pressure groups and lobbies ==
State-approved, compulsory-membership chambers of labour, commerce and agriculture, as well as by trade unions and lobbyist groups exercise sometimes significant influence on the Federal Government. Decisions of the so-called Austrian Social Partnership (Sozialpartnerschaft), consisting of the trade union and the chambers of commerce, labour and farmers, affect a number of Austrian laws and policies, for example its labour law and labour market policy. Lobbying regulation is weaker for professional and public interest groups.

=== Overview of groups ===
Austrian National Union of Students (ÖH), Austrian Trade Union Federation (ÖGB), Chamber of Labor (AK), Conference of the Presidents of Farmers' Chambers, Economic Chamber of Austria (WKO), Federation of Austrian Industry (VOeI), Roman Catholic Church, including its chief lay organization, Catholic Action.

== Foreign relations ==
In 1955 Austria passed the Declaration of Neutrality declaring the country permanently neutral, on which Austria based her foreign policy from then on. In the 1990s the meaning of this neutrality was changed with Austria becoming a member of the European Union in 1995 and her participation in UN peacekeeping missions. Since the start of 2009 Austria is a non-permanent member of the United Nations Security Council.

=== International organization participation ===
- AfDB
- AsDB
- Australia Group
- BIS
- BSEC (observer)
- CCC
- CE
- CEI
- CERN
- EAPC
- EBRD
- ECE
- EIB
- EMU
- ESA
- EU
- FAO
- G-9
- IADB
- IAEA
- IBRD
- ICAO
- ICC
- ICC
- ICFTU
- ICRM
- IDA
- IEA
- IFAD
- IFC
- IFRCS
- ILO
- IMF
- IIASA
- International Maritime Organization
- Intelsat
- Interpol
- IOC
- IOM
- ISO
- ITU
- MINURSO
- NAM (guest)
- NEA
- NSG
- OAS (observer)
- OECD
- OPCW
- OSCE
- PCA
- PFP
- UN
- UNCTAD
- UNDOF
- UNESCO
- UNFICYP
- UNHCR
- UNIDO
- UNIKOM
- UNITAR
- UNMIBH
- UNMIK
- UNMOT
- UNOMIG
- UNTAET
- UNTSO
- UPU
- WCL
- WEU (observer)
- WFTU
- WHO
- WIPO
- WMO
- WToO
- WTrO
- Zangger Committee

== Maps ==
States in which the FPÖ is involved in the state government as a small coalition partner (Dark Blue); states in which the FPÖ is represented in the state parliament as an opposition party (Light Blue)

Dark Black in state government

Dark Red in state government

Dark green in state government

Dark red in state parliament

== See also ==
- Corruption in Austria
- Municipal council (Austria)
