= Josef Klaus =

Austrian politician; Chancellor from 1964 to 1970

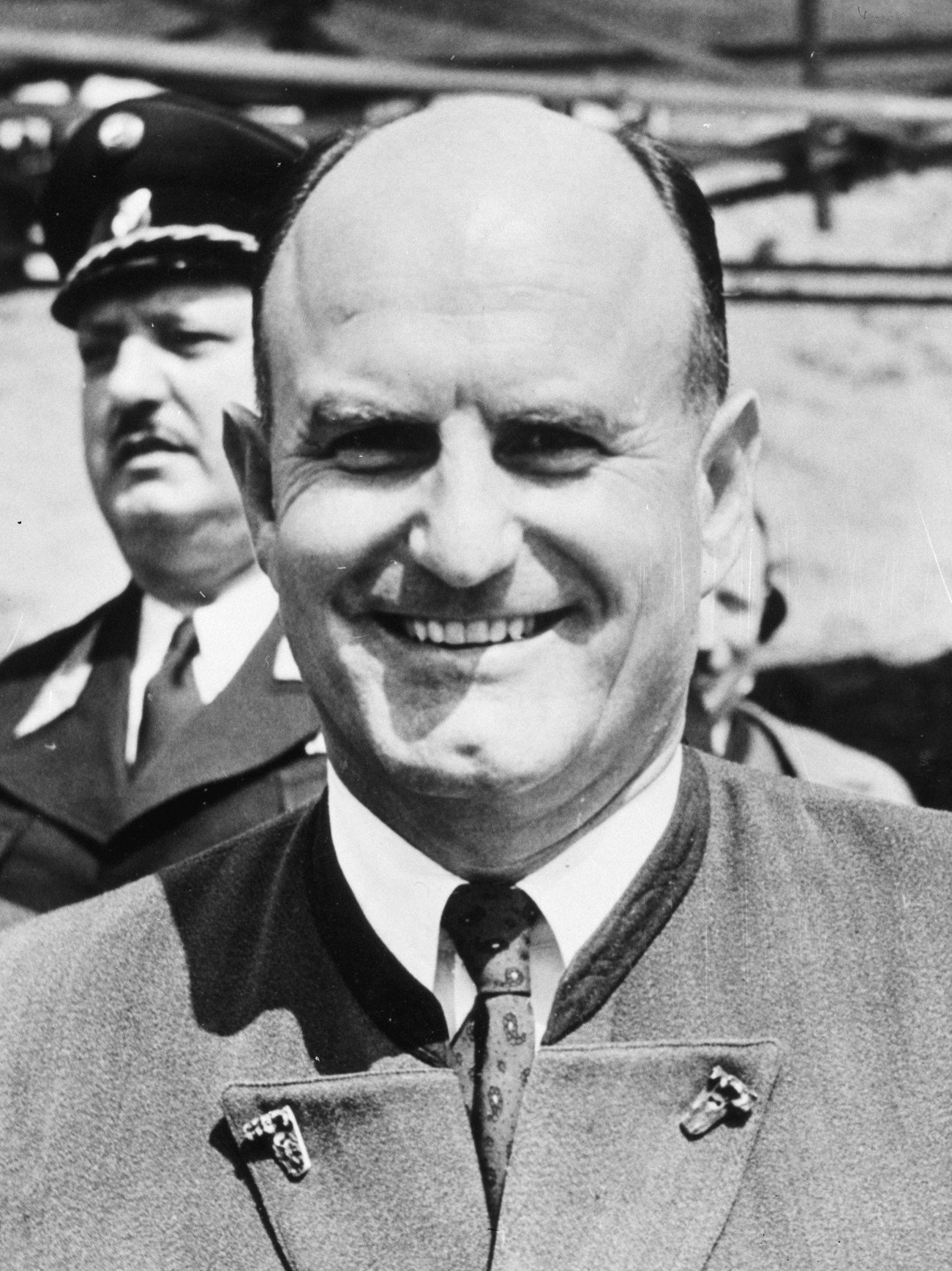
- Klaus in 1964

Chancellor of Austria
- In office 2 April 1964 – 21 April 1970
- President: Adolf Schärf; Franz Jonas
- Vice-Chancellor: Bruno Pittermann; Fritz Bock; Hermann Withalm
- Preceded by: Alfons Gorbach
- Succeeded by: Bruno Kreisky

Minister of Finance
- In office 11 April 1961 – 27 March 1963
- Chancellor: Alfons Gorbach
- Preceded by: Eduard Heilingsetzer
- Succeeded by: Franz Korinek

Governor of Salzburg
- In office 1 December 1949 – 17 April 1961
- Preceded by: Josef Rehrl
- Succeeded by: Hans Lechner

Personal details
- Born: 15 August 1910 Kötschach-Mauthen, Carinthia, Austria-Hungary
- Died: 25 July 2001 (aged 90) Vienna, Austria
- Party: People's Party
- Education: University of Vienna

Josef Klaus (15 August 1910 – 25 July 2001) was an Austrian politician of the conservative People's Party (ÖVP). He served as State Governor (Landeshauptmann) of Salzburg from 1949 to 1961, as Minister of Finance from 1961 to 1963 and as Chancellor of Austria from 1964 to 1970.

== Biography ==
Born in Kötschach-Mauthen, Carinthia, the son of a master baker, Klaus attended the Catholic junior seminary in Klagenfurt. He studied law at the University of Vienna, where he joined the Cartellverband of Catholic male student fraternities (Studentenverbindung). He obtained his doctorate in 1934 and worked in the legal department of the Chamber of Labour which at that time was integrated into the Austrofascist unitary trade union centres by the government of the Federal State of Austria. When the Chamber organisation finally was liquidated after the 1938 Anschluss annexation by Nazi Germany, Klaus changed to the private sector.

In 1936, Klaus married Ernestine Seywald (2 April 1914 – 1 January 2001). During World War II he served in the German Wehrmacht, temporarily as a staff member for General Heinz Guderian, as well as in campaigns in Poland, France, Finland and Russia. He was captured in early 1945 and held in a POW camp. After the war he worked as a lawyer in Hallein; in 1948 he became chairman of the regional ÖVP section Hallein District and pursued his political career.

Klaus was elected governor of the Austrian state of Salzburg in 1949. Re-elected twice in 1954 and 1959, he rose to a leading member of the ÖVP. When his party colleague, Chancellor Julius Raab, finally resigned in 1961, Klaus' influence as a representative of the "young reformers" grew. He became Minister of Finance under Raab's successor Alfons Gorbach, whom he succeeded as ÖVP party chairman on 20 September 1963. When Gorbach resigned on 25 February 1964, Klaus also followed him as Chancellor.

In office from 2 April 1964, Klaus initially continued the grand coalition with the Socialists under Vice-Chancellor Bruno Pittermann according to the Proporz system that had governed Austria since 1945. He led the ÖVP into the 1966 legislative election, during which he called for an end to the coalition. At that election, the ÖVP won a three-seat majority, theoretically leaving Klaus free to break off the coalition. However, reversing himself, Klaus proposed new coalition terms to Pittermann's successor as Socialist leader, Bruno Kreisky. Talks broke down when the Socialist rank and file balked at the proposed terms. Klaus then formed an exclusively ÖVP cabinet, the first one-party government of the Second Republic. In June first steps were agreed on joining the European Economic Community which in the long run finally led to Austria joining the European Union in 1995.

Klaus started many reforms and is remembered for his effective stewardship of the government, but he lost the 1970 election to Kreisky's Socialists. Klaus might have been able to continue by entering into a coalition with the Freedom Party of Austria (FPÖ), but immediately resigned after losing the elections.

Despite his "hard image", Klaus was celebrated at his 90th birthday all over the country. In September 1971 he published his memoirs "Macht und Ohnmacht in Österreich", and up to 1995 he frequently led seminars on political and social themes.

Klaus died on 25 July 2001 at the age of 90.

Political offices
Preceded by Josef Rehrl	Governor of Salzburg; 1949 – 1961	Succeeded by Hans Lechner
Preceded by Eduard Heilingsetzer	Minister of Finance; 1961 – 1963	Succeeded by Franz Korinek
Preceded by Alfons Gorbach	Chancellor of Austria; 1964 – 1970	Succeeded by Bruno Kreisky
Party political offices
Preceded by Alfons Gorbach	Chair of the Austrian People's Party; 1964 – 1970	Succeeded by Hermann Withalm
