= Alfred Worm =

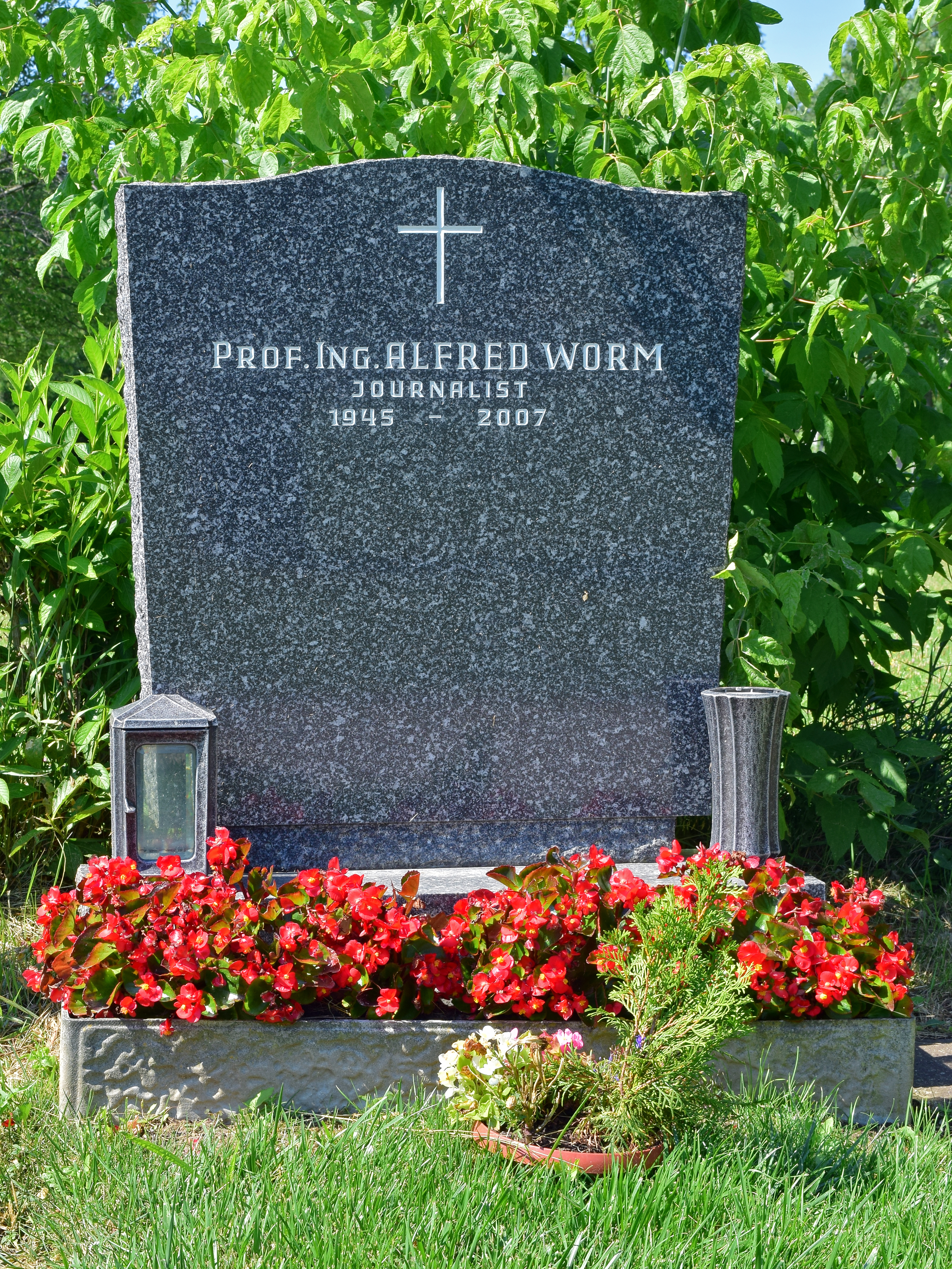
Grave of Alfred Worm at the Vienna Central Cemetery

Alfred Worm (14 June 1945 – 4 February 2007) was an Austrian journalist, author and vocational high school teacher ("professor" in Austrian German).

== Career ==
Worm was born in Gmünd, Lower Austria, and began his professional studies at HTL Mödling, an engineering school in Austria. He trained as an underground construction engineer, graduating in 1964. He worked nearly ten years as an engineer in the construction industry before he began to report on the dubious practices that he had observed within large construction firms.

In 1973, Worm uncovered the famous Bauring-Skandals (building ring scandals). At this point he changed to become a full-time investigative reporter. He pursued the bribery and fraud affairs in large building projects in Austria. From 1974 - 1994 he was first an editor and then deputy editor-in-chief of profil, an Austrian news magazine. In 1980, he uncovered the AKH scandal, where a 1 billion schilling new hospital for Vienna programmed to begin construction in 1955 ended up being the most expensive hospital in Europe at 45,000,000,000 schillings. For this effort he received the Dr. Karl Renner journalism prize (Dr.-Karl-Renner-Publizistikpreis) in 1981.

In the mid-1980s, he uncovered the hidden past of Kurt Waldheim in what came to be known as the Waldheim Affair. In 1985, Worm uncovered the Noricum scandal. Noricum, a subsidiary of Austria's largest state-run steel and engineering group, was an arms manufacturer involved in illegal arms sales to Iran. In May 1994, he moved from Profil to News (an Austrian weekly news magazine) and worked under Wolfgang Fellner, who was then editor-in-chief.

From the mid-1980s, Worm taught at the Institute for Journalism and Communication Science at the University of Vienna. Beginning in 1988 he was considerably involved in getting the Institute its own building on the Schopenhauerstrasse. During his entire teaching career, Worm was not only concerned with solid journalist training, and the importance of ethics, but with the promotion of young journalists as well. As a very prominent journalist, his work at the Institute attracted a substantial student body.

From 1983 - 1988, Worm acted as a consultant for the Austrian People's Party (ÖVP) in the parliament (Landstag) of the Viennese federal state.

Just three days after receiving the honour of the 2006 Journalist of the Year award by the magazine Der Österreichische Journalist, he died in Vienna, sometime during the night of 4 February 2007, aged 61, of a heart attack.
