= Kern government =

Government of Austria from 2016 to 2017

- 29th Cabinet of Austria

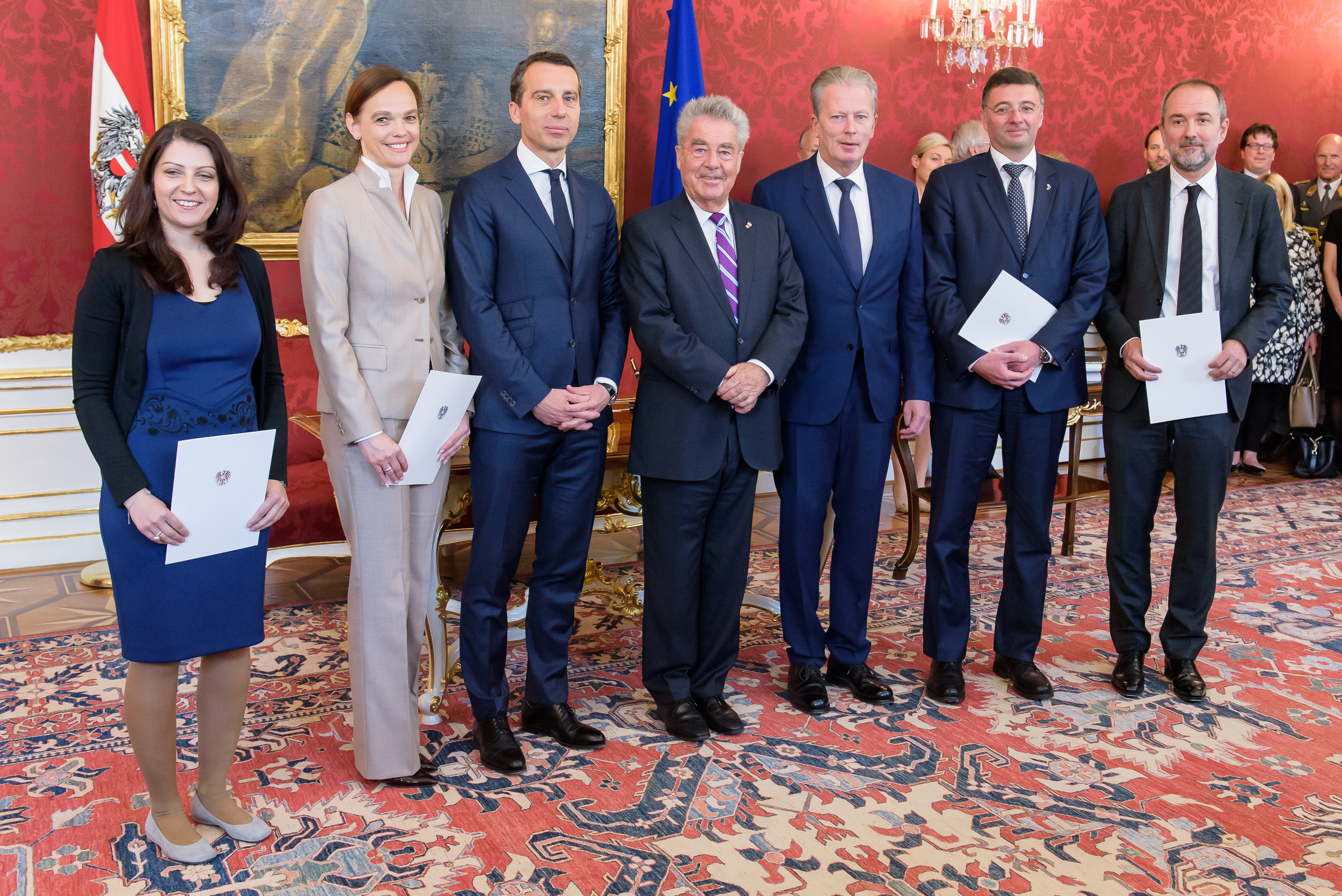
- Kern with President Heinz Fischer and Vice-Chancellor Reinhold Mitterlehner at the swearing-in ceremony of his new cabinet members
- Date formed: 18 May 2016
- Date dissolved: 18 December 2017

People and organisations
- Appointed by: Heinz Fischer
- Chancellor: Christian Kern
- Vice-Chancellor: Reinhold Mitterlehner
- Member parties: Social Democratic Party of Austria (SPÖ); Austrian People's Party (ÖVP)
- Status in legislature: Grand coalition
- No. of ministers: 12
- Opposition party: Freedom Party of Austria (FPÖ); The Greens (GRÜNE); Team Stronach; NEOS
- Opposition leader: Heinz-Christian Strache

History
- Election(s): 2013 election
- Predecessor: Second Faymann cabinet
- Successor: First Kurz government

The Kern government was the 29th Government of Austria, in office from 18 May 2016 to 18 December 2017. It was a grand coalition between the Social Democratic Party (SPÖ) and People's Party (ÖVP), in which Christian Kern held the position of chancellor and Reinhold Mitterlehner was vice-chancellor.

Succeeding the Second Faymann government, following the resignation of Chancellor Werner Faymann amidst the 2016 presidential election, it was succeeded by the First Kurz government following the 2017 legislative election. The cabinet was appointed by outgoing President Heinz Fischer.

== Composition ==
Portfolio	Minister	Took office	Left office	Party
Chancellery
Federal Chancellor	Christian Kern	17 May 2016	18 December 2017	SPÖ
State secretary in the Federal Chancellery	Muna Duzdar	18 May 2016	18 December 2017	SPÖ
Vice-Chancellor	Reinhold Mitterlehner	1 September 2014	17 May 2017	ÖVP
Vice-Chancellor	Wolfgang Brandstetter	17 May 2017	18 December 2017	Independent
Federal Minister at the Chancellery for Arts and Culture, Constitutional Affairs, and Media	Thomas Drozda	18 May 2016	18 December 2017	SPÖ
Federal Ministry for Europe, Integration and Foreign Affairs
Federal Minister for Europe, Integration and Foreign Affairs	Sebastian Kurz	16 December 2013	18 December 2017	ÖVP
Ministry for Finance
Minister of Finance	Hans Jörg Schelling	1 September 2014	18 December 2017	ÖVP
Federal Ministry for Agriculture, Forestry, Environment and Water Management
Federal Minister for Agriculture, Forestry, Environment and Water Management	Andrä Rupprechter	16 December 2013	18 December 2017	ÖVP
Federal Ministry for National Defence and Sport
Federal Minister for National Defense and Sports	Hans Peter Doskozil	26 January 2016	18 December 2017	SPÖ
Federal Ministry for Families and Youth
Federal Minister for Families and Youth	Sophie Karmasin	16 December 2013	18 December 2017	Independent
Ministry of Education and Women's Affairs
Minister of Education and Women's Affairs	Sonja Hammerschmid	18 May 2016	18 December 2017	Independent
Federal Ministry for Health
Federal Minister for Health and Women	Sabine Oberhauser	16 December 2013	23 February 2017	SPÖ
Federal Minister for Health and Women	Pamela Rendi-Wagner	8 March 2017	18 December 2017	SPÖ
Federal Ministry for Interior Affairs
Federal Minister for Interior Affairs	Wolfgang Sobotka	21 April 2016	18 December 2017	ÖVP
Ministry of Justice
Federal Minister for Justice	Wolfgang Brandstetter	16 December 2013	18 December 2017	Independent
Federal Ministry for Labour, Social Affairs and Consumer Protection
Federal Minister for Labour, Social Affairs and Consumer Protection	Alois Stöger	26 January 2016	18 December 2017	SPÖ
Ministry for Transport, Innovation and Technology
Minister for Transport, Innovation and Technology	Jörg Leichtfried	18 May 2016	18 December 2017	SPÖ
Federal Ministry for Science, Research and Economy
Federal Minister for Science, Research and Economy	Reinhold Mitterlehner	16 December 2013	17 May 2017	ÖVP
Federal Minister for Science, Research and Economy	Harald Mahrer	17 May 2017	18 December 2017	ÖVP
State secretary in the Federal Ministry for Science, Research and Economy	Harald Mahrer	1 September 2014	17 May 2017	ÖVP
