= Second Faymann government =

Government of Werner Faymann

- 28th government of Austria

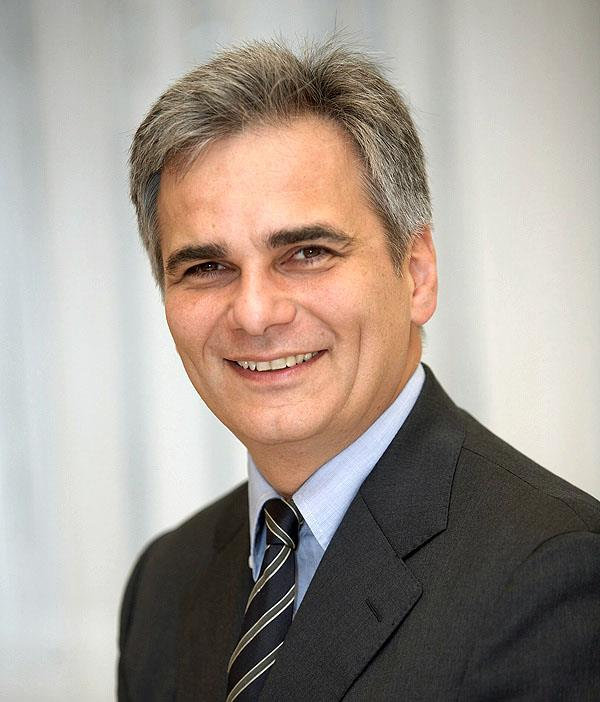
- Date formed: 16 December 2013
- Date dissolved: 17 May 2016

People and organisations
- Head of government: Werner Faymann
- Deputy head of government: Reinhold Mitterlehner
- No. of ministers: 15
- Member parties: Social Democratic Party of Austria (SPÖ); Austrian People's Party (ÖVP)
- Status in legislature: Grand coalition
- Opposition party: Freedom Party of Austria (FPÖ); The Greens (GRÜNE); Team Stronach; NEOS
- Opposition leader: Heinz-Christian Strache

History
- Election: 2013 election
- Predecessor: First Faymann government
- Successor: Kern government

The Second Faymann government was a government of Austrian Chancellor Werner Faymann. It took office on 16 December 2013 following the 2013 legislative election, succeeding the First Faymann government. On 17 May 2016, it was succeeded by the Kern government, following Faymann's resignation amidst the 2016 presidential election.

In the 2013 legislative election the Social Democratic Party of Austria and the Austrian People's Party lost 5 seats and 4 seats, respectively, but with a total of 99 seats they remained in majority. On 14 October 2013 the two parties began government formation talks with each other, which resulted in the Second Faymann government that was appointed by President of Austria Heinz Fischer.

The government consists of 7 ministers from the Social Democratic Party of Austria, 6 ministers from the Austrian People's Party while 2 ministers are Independent. Minister for Foreign Affairs Sebastian Kurz is at the age of 27 the youngest person ever in Austria's history to become Federal Minister; he is also the youngest minister for foreign affairs in the European Union.

On 9 May 2016, shortly after the first round of the 2016 presidential election, Chancellor Faymann declared he would step down. Vice Chancellor Mitterlehner took over as interim chancellor.

== Composition ==
Portfolio	Minister	Took office	Left office	Party
Federal Chancellery
Federal Chancellor	Werner Faymann	16 December 2013	9 May 2016	SPÖ
Federal Chancellor	Reinhold Mitterlehner (acting)	9 May 2016	17 May 2016	ÖVP
Vice-Chancellor	Michael Spindelegger	16 December 2013	1 September 2014	ÖVP
Vice-Chancellor	Reinhold Mitterlehner	1 September 2014	17 May 2016	ÖVP
Federal Minister at the Chancellery for Arts, Culture, and Media	Josef Ostermayer	16 December 2013	Incumbent	SPÖ
Secretary of State at the Chancellery for Public Administration and Civil Servants	Sonja Steßl	1 September 2014	17 May 2016	SPÖ
Federal Ministry for Europe, Integration and Foreign Affairs
Federal Minister for Europe, Integration and Foreign Affairs	Sebastian Kurz	16 December 2013	17 May 2016	ÖVP
Federal Ministry for Finance
Federal Minister for Finance	Michael Spindelegger	16 December 2013	1 September 2014	ÖVP
Federal Minister for Finance	Hans Jörg Schelling	1 September 2014	17 May 2016	ÖVP
Secretary of State	Sonja Steßl	16 December 2013	1 September 2014	SPÖ
Secretary of State	Jochen Danninger	1 September 2014	17 May 2016	ÖVP
Federal Ministry for Agriculture, Forestry, Environment and Water Management
Federal Minister for Agriculture, Forestry, Environment and Water Management	Andrä Rupprechter	16 December 2013	17 May 2016	ÖVP
Federal Ministry for National Defense and Sports
Federal Minister for National Defense and Sports	Gerald Klug	16 December 2013	26 January 2016	SPÖ
Federal Minister for National Defense and Sports	Hans Peter Doskozil	26 January 2016	17 May 2016	SPÖ
Federal Ministry for Families and Youth
Federal Minister for Families and Youth	Sophie Karmasin	16 December 2013	17 May 2016	Independent
Federal Ministry for Education and Women
Federal Minister for Education and Women	Gabriele Heinisch-Hosek	16 December 2013	17 May 2016	SPÖ
Federal Ministry for Health
Federal Minister for Health	Alois Stöger	16 December 2013	1 September 2014	SPÖ
Federal Minister for Health	Sabine Oberhauser	1 September 2014	17 May 2016	SPÖ
Federal Ministry for Interior Affairs
Federal Minister for Interior Affairs	Johanna Mikl-Leitner	16 December 2013	21 April 2016	ÖVP
Federal Minister for Interior Affairs	Wolfgang Sobotka	21 April 2016	17 May 2016	ÖVP
Federal Ministry for Justice
Federal Minister for Justice	Wolfgang Brandstetter	16 December 2013	17 May 2016	Independent
Federal Ministry for Labour, Social Affairs and Consumer Protection
Federal Minister for Labour, Social Affairs and Consumer Protection	Rudolf Hundstorfer	16 December 2013	26 January 2016	SPÖ
Federal Minister for Labour, Social Affairs and Consumer Protection	Alois Stöger	26 January 2016	17 May 2016	SPÖ
Ministry for Transport, Innovation and Technology
Minister for Transport, Innovation and Technology	Doris Bures	16 December 2013	1 September 2014	SPÖ
Minister for Transport, Innovation and Technology	Alois Stöger	1 September 2014	26 January 2016	SPÖ
Minister for Transport, Innovation and Technology	Gerald Klug	26 January 2016	17 May 2016	SPÖ
Federal Ministry for Science, Research and Economy
Federal Minister for Science, Research and Economy	Reinhold Mitterlehner	16 December 2013	17 May 2016	ÖVP
Secretary of State	Harald Mahrer	1 September 2014	17 May 2016	ÖVP
