= Faymann government =

Faymann government may refer to two government cabinets in Austria:

- the First Faymann government (2008–2013)
- the Second Faymann government (2013–2016)
