= GRG 12 Erlgasse =

Secondary school in Vienna, Austria

Coordinates: 48°10′36.12″N 16°19′38.28″E

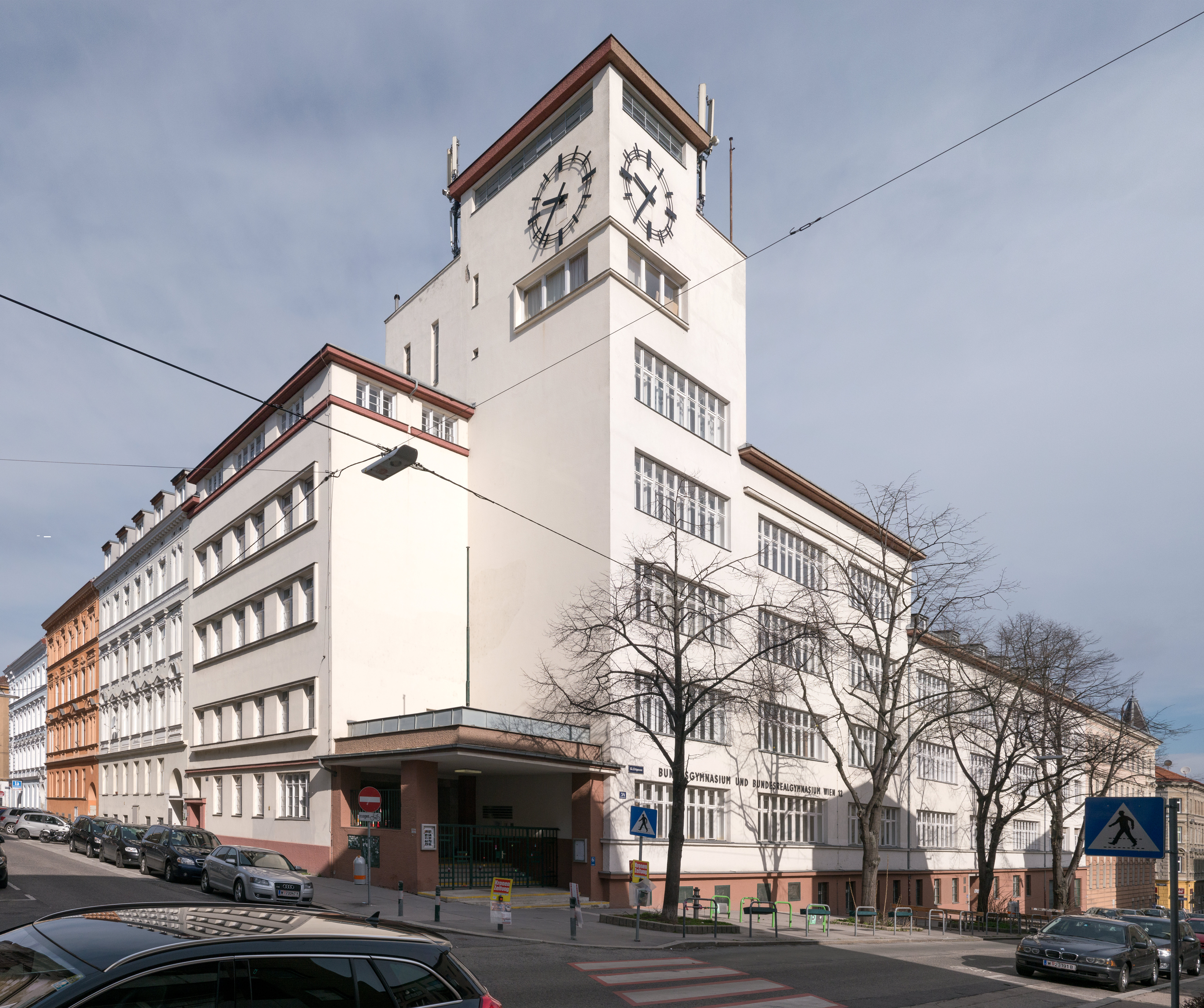
School building, completed in 1931, used by the GRG 12 Erlgasse since 1940

The GRG 12 Erlgasse is a secondary school in Meidling, the 12th district of Vienna, the capital of Austria.

== Name ==
In the Austrian school system, GRG stands for "Gymnasium" (with a focus on languages and humanities) and "Realgymnasium" (with a focus on science and mathematics). The number 12 indicates its location in the 12th district.

== History ==
In the early 1900s, due to the growing population in Meidling, a secondary school was established for the 1910/1911 school year. It began with 58 students under director Ferdinand Ginzel. Initially housed in temporary locations, the school moved to Schönbrunner Straße 189 in 1913 and was nationalised that same year. By 1929/1930, it had 385 students.

In 1940, the school relocated to its current building on Erlgasse and was named Staatliche Oberschule für Jungen (State secondary school for boys) under the Nazi regime. After the Second World War, it temporarily operated in the 15th district before returning to the Erlgasse building in 1947.

From 1940 to 1972, multiple schools shared the Erlgasse building, including a Czech school and separate boys' and girls' high schools (BRG XII and Girls Vienna XII). Over time, both began admitting students of all genders. In 1972, BRG XII moved to Liesing, the 23rd district, where it became GRG 23/VBS. Since 1973, only the former girls' school, now GRG 12, remains at Erlgasse. As the school has been attended by several future politicians, including two-time Chancellor of Austria Sebastian Kurz, it was also known as the "Erlgasse elite school".

== Notable alumni ==
- Robert Lichal (1932 - 2024) - Minister of Defense from 1987 to 1990.
- Pamela Rendi-Wagner (b. 1971) - chairwoman of the SPÖ from 2018 to 2023, current director of the European Centre for Disease Prevention and Control.
- Sebastian Kurz (b. 1986) - former Chancellor of Austria.
