= Josef Moser (jurist) =

Austrian lawyer and politician

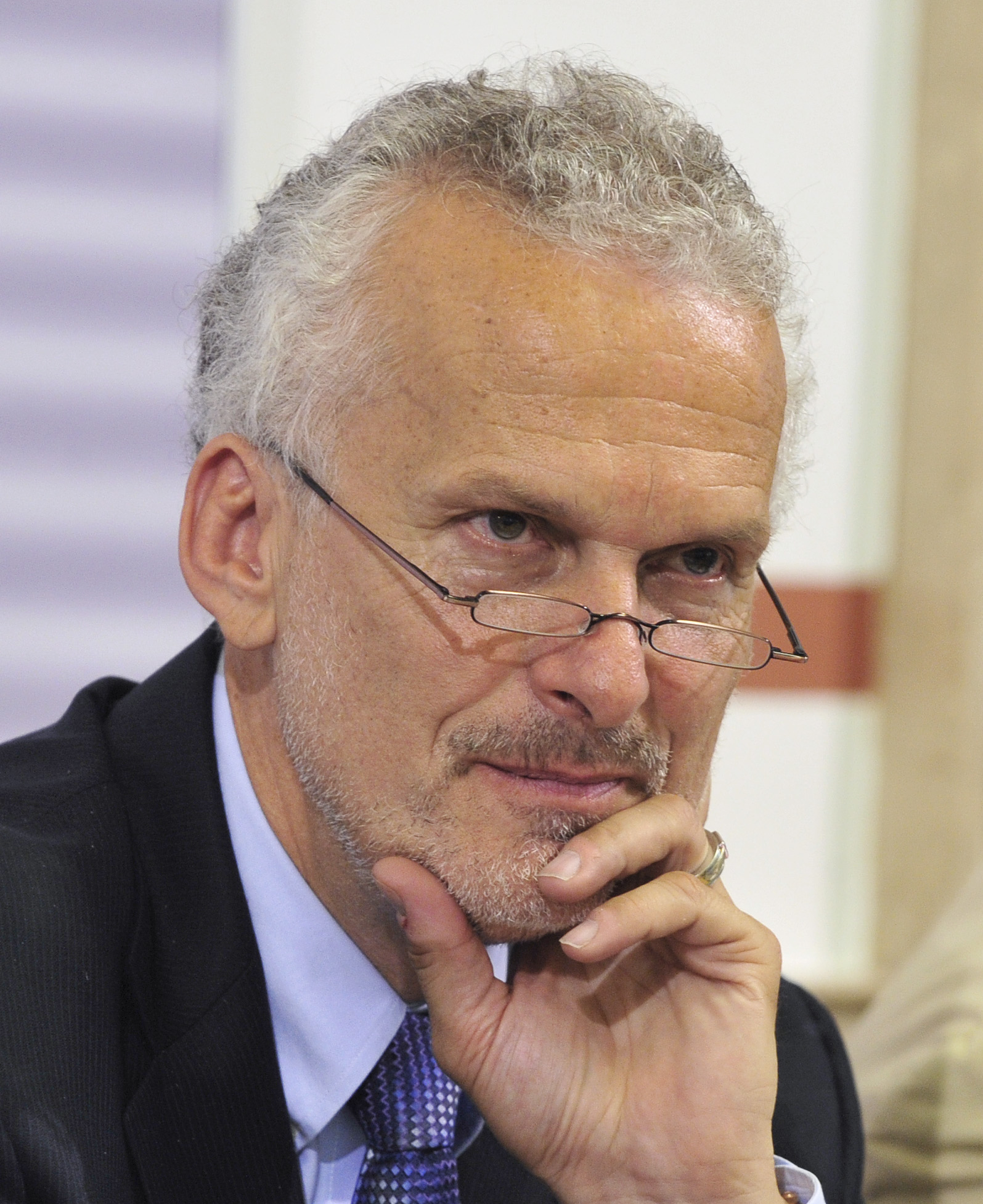

Minister of Justice
- In office 18 December 2017 – 3 June 2019
- Chancellor: Sebastian Kurz
- Preceded by: Wolfgang Brandstetter
- Succeeded by: Clemens Jabloner

President of the Court of Audit
- In office 1 July 2004 – 30 June 2016
- Preceded by: Franz Fiedler
- Succeeded by: Margit Kraker

Personal details
- Born: 6 October 1955 (age 69); Lienz, Tyrol, Austria
- Political party: Freedom Party

Josef Moser is an Austrian lawyer and politician. He served as the Minister of Justice of Austria from 18. December 2017 until 3. June 2019.
