= Sabine Oberhauser =

Austrian physician and politician (1963-2017)

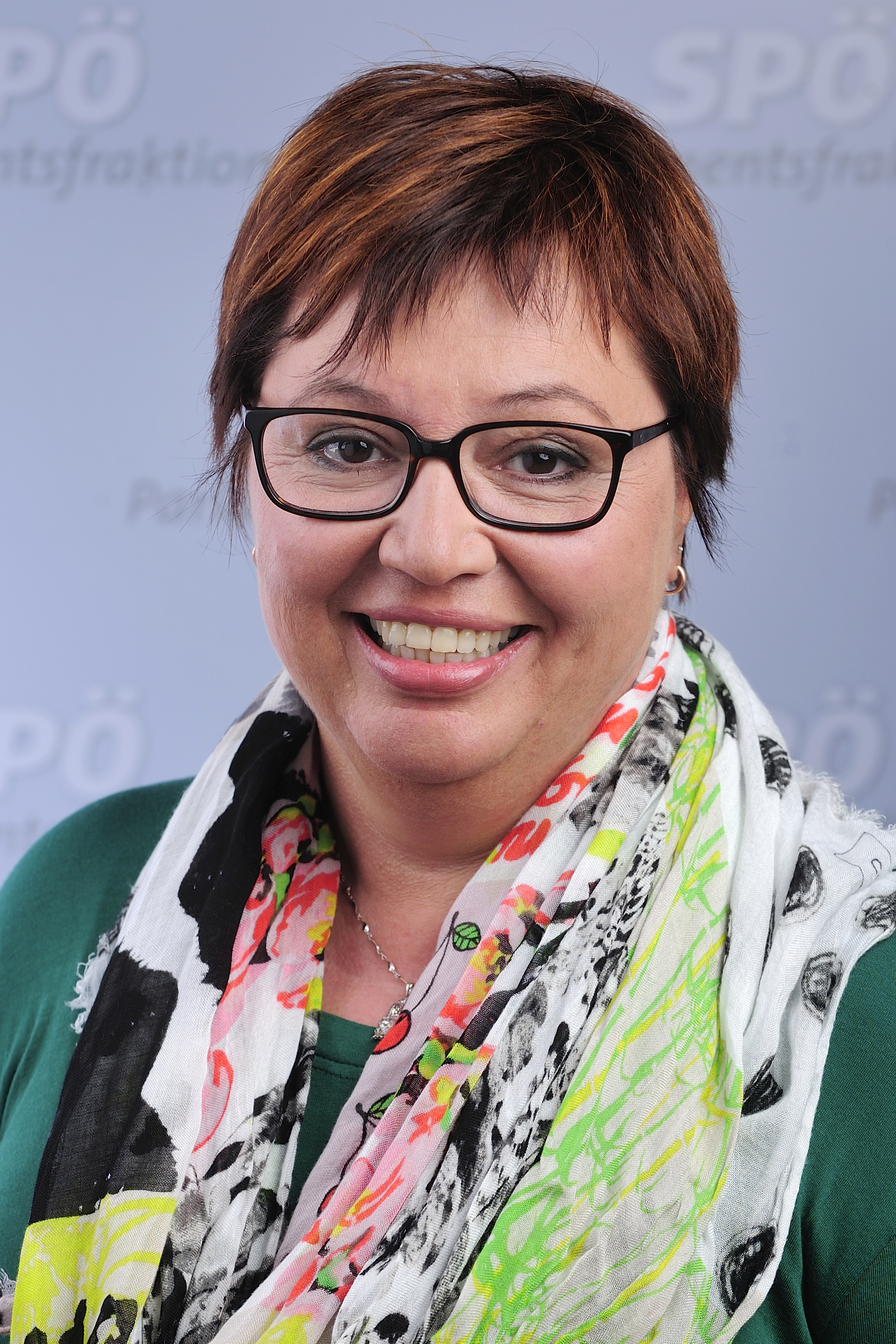
- Oberhauser in April 2014
- Born: August 30, 1963; Vienna
- Died: February 23, 2017 (aged 53)
- Occupations: Physician and politician
- Medical career
- Profession: Minister for Health and Minister for Women

Sabine Oberhauser (30 August 1963 – 23 February 2017) was an Austrian physician and politician. At the time of her death, she was Austria's Minister for Health and Minister for Women.

== Biography ==
Oberhauser was born in Vienna. In 2014, she became a minister in the Social Democrat-Christian Conservative coalition government of then-Chancellor Werner Faymann. She continued as Minister for Health when Christian Kern took over the coalition two years later. The same year, she became the Minister for Women. She made her diagnosis of abdominal cancer public in 2015.

Oberhauser was married and had two daughters.

Oberhauser entered hospital in February 2017 for treatment of a ventricular fuse, and announced on 15 February that Alois Stöger would stand in for her during her illness. However, her condition soon deteriorated and she died a week later, on 23 February 2017. She was 53. She was cremated at Feuerhalle Simmering; her ashes are buried in Hietzing Cemetery in Vienna.

== See also ==
- List of members of the Austrian Parliament who died in office
