= Reinhold Mitterlehner =

Austrian politician (born 1955)

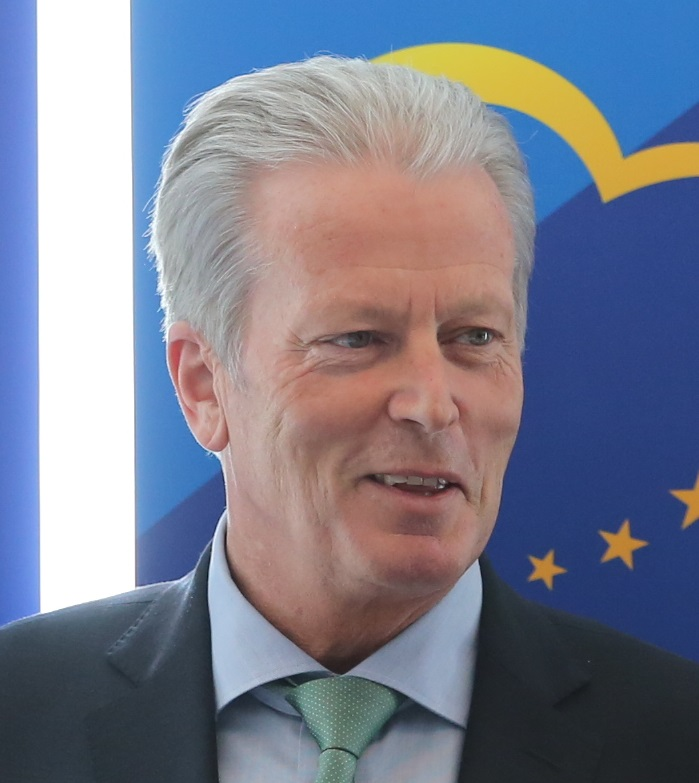
- Mitterlehner in 2019

Vice-Chancellor of Austria
- In office 1 September 2014 – 17 May 2017
- Chancellor: Werner Faymann; Christian Kern
- Preceded by: Michael Spindelegger
- Succeeded by: Wolfgang Brandstetter

Chair of the People's Party
- In office 8 November 2014 – 15 May 2017
- Preceded by: Michael Spindelegger
- Succeeded by: Sebastian Kurz

Minister of Economics
- In office 2 December 2008 – 17 May 2017
- Chancellor: Werner Faymann; Christian Kern
- Preceded by: Martin Bartenstein
- Succeeded by: Harald Mahrer

Personal details
- Born: 10 December 1955 (age 70) Helfenberg, Austria
- Party: People's Party
- Children: 3
- Education: Johannes Kepler University Linz

Reinhold Mitterlehner (Austrian German pronunciation: [ˈraɪnhɔld ˈmɪtɐˌleːnɐ]; born 10 December 1955) is an Austrian politician of the Austrian People's Party (ÖVP) who served as minister of economy in Austria's government from 2008 until 2017. In September 2014 he also became vice chancellor of Austria and chairman of the ÖVP. On 9 May 2016 he briefly assumed powers and duties as Acting Chancellor of Austria while his coalition partner, the Social Democratic Party, underwent a change in leadership. After a series of quarrels within the grand coalition as well as his own party, Mitterlehner announced his resignation on 10 May 2017, which became effective on 17 May 2017.

== Early life and education ==
Mitterlehner was born in Helfenberg, Upper Austria, on 10 December 1955. He holds a doctorate in law, which he received from the Johannes Kepler University Linz in 1980. He then attended a post-graduate course in association management in Fribourg.

== Career ==
From 1980 to 1992 Mitterlehner worked at the Upper Austrian economic chamber, where he assumed various posts, including the head of the marketing department. From 1992 to 2000 he served as the secretary general of the Austrian Economic League (ÖWB) in Vienna. In addition, he was a local politician in Ahorn from 1991 to 1997. He was appointed party chairman for Rohrbach District in May 2002.

=== Member of the Austrian Parliament, 2000–2008 ===
A member of the Austrian People's Party (ÖVP), Mitterlehner was elected to the Austrian Parliament on 8 February 2000, where he served on the Committee on Labour and Social Affairs (2000–2008); the Committee on Economic Affairs (2000–2008); and the finance committee (2003–2008), among others.

Meanwhile, also in 2000, Mitterlehner was named deputy secretary general of the Austrian federal economic chamber (WKO), holding that post until 2008.

=== Federal Minister of Economic Affairs, 2008–2017 ===
Following the 2008 national elections, on 2 December 2008, Mitterlehner was appointed as Federal Minister of Economy, Family and Youth as part of the coalition government led by Chancellor Werner Faymann. In 2008, he was also named vice president of the Austrian Energy Agency.

Mitterlehner was one of the leading candidates to succeed Josef Pröll, who left the leadership of the party in April 2011. Instead, from 2011 to 2014 he was deputy federal chairman of the People's Party and only became the successor of Michael Spindelegger as party chairman in September 2014 from whom he also took the position of Vice Chancellor of Austria. At the time, Mitterlehner said he would prefer not to serve as finance minister as well, a dual role that Spindelegger had performed.

After the ÖVP lost votes in provincial elections to the right-wing, anti-immigration Freedom Party (FPÖ) in 2015, Mitterlehner publicly threatened to quit the coalition government if Faymann's Social Democrat partners did not toughen their policies on migrants and shrink the welfare state.

== Other activities ==
=== Corporate boards ===
- Oberösterreichische Versicherung (OÖ), Chairman of the Supervisory Board (since 2019)
- Global Hydro Energy, Member of the Advisory Board

=== Non-profit organizations ===
- Österreichische Forschungsgemeinschaft (ÖFG), President (since 2018)
- National Fund of the Republic of Austria for Victims of National Socialism, ex officio member of the board of trustees
- Industriewissenschaftliches Institut (IWI), member of the board of trustees
- International Association for the Exchange of Students for Technical Experience (IAESTE), member of the board of trustees

== Personal life ==
Mitterlehner is married and has three daughters.

Political offices
Preceded by Martin Bartenstein	Minister of Economics and Labour; 2008–2009	Succeeded by Himself as Minister of Economics, Family and Youth
Preceded by Martin Bartenstein	Minister of Economics and Labour; 2008–2009	Succeeded by Rudolf Hundstorfer as Minister of Labour, Social Affairs and Consumer Protection
Preceded by Himself as Minister of Economics and Labour	Minister of Economics, Family and Youth; 2009–2013	Succeeded by Himself as Minister of Science, Research and Economics
Preceded by Andrea Kdolsky as Minister of Health, Family and Youth	Minister of Economics, Family and Youth; 2009–2013	Succeeded by Sophie Karmasin as Minister of Family and Youth
Preceded by Karlheinz Töchterle as Minister of Science and Research	Minister of Science, Research and Economics; 2013–2017	Succeeded by Harald Mahrer
Preceded by Himself as Minister of Economics, Family and Youth	Minister of Science, Research and Economics; 2013–2017	Succeeded by Harald Mahrer
Preceded by Michael Spindelegger	Vice-Chancellor of Austria; 2014–2017	Succeeded by Wolfgang Brandstetter
Party political offices
Preceded by Michael Spindelegger	Chair of the Austrian People's Party; 2014–2017	Succeeded by Sebastian Kurz
