= Kurz corruption probe =

Investigation regarding Austrian Chancellor Sebastian Kurz

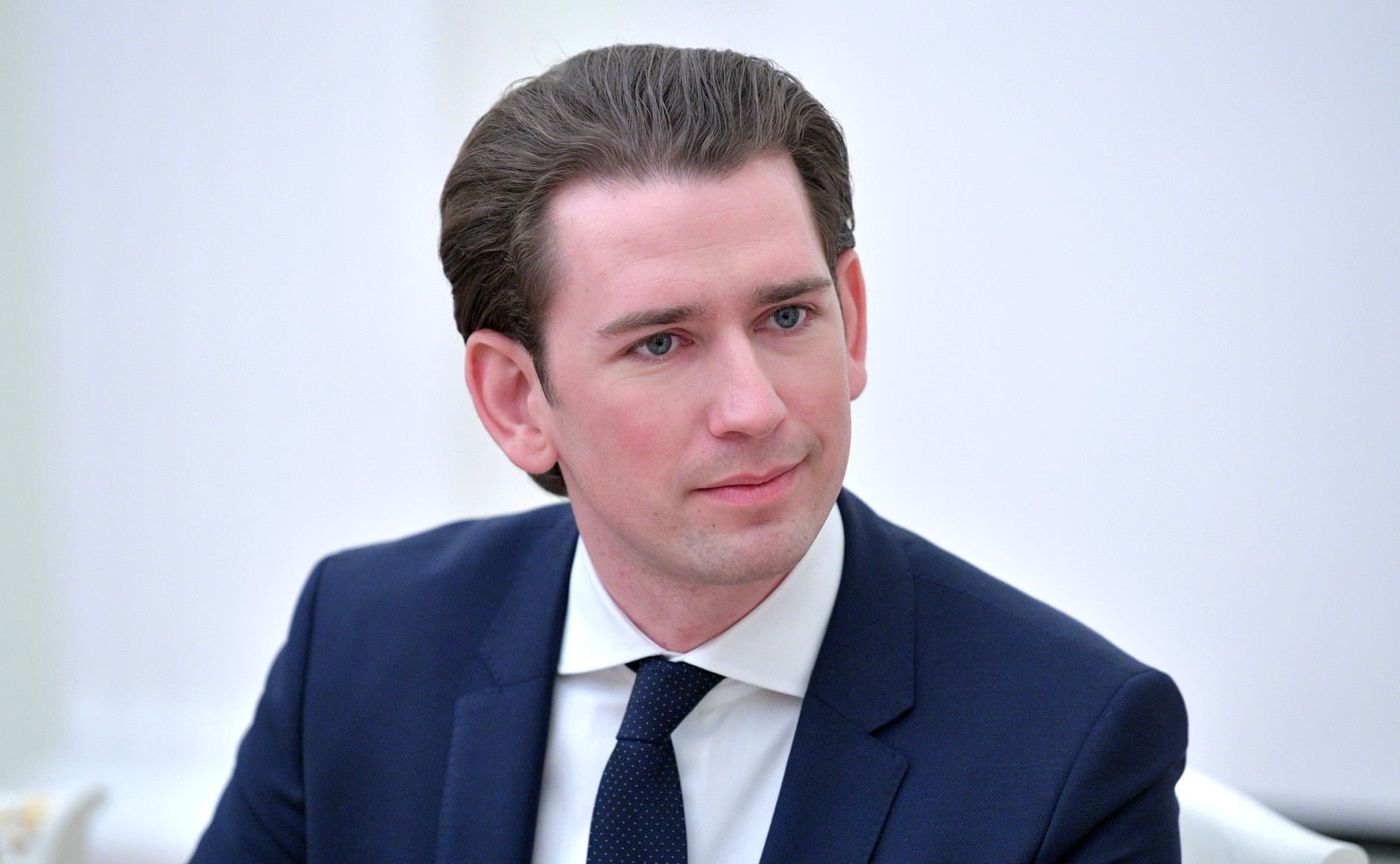
Sebastian Kurz in 2018

On 6 October 2021, Austrian anti-corruption prosecutors conducted a raid on the offices of Federal Chancellor Sebastian Kurz, the headquarters of the Austrian People's Party, and the Federal Ministry of Finance. Kurz, along with nine high-profile politicians and newspaper executives, has been accused of embezzlement and bribery. According to the prosecutors, public money has been misused to fund politically motivated and occasionally manipulated opinion polls, with the funding being conduited through advertisements in the Österreich newspaper on behalf of the Federal Ministry of Finance.

As a result of the raid, Kurz has sustained heavy criticism from his junior coalition partner, The Greens – The Green Alternative, as well as the opposition. Greens leader Werner Kogler described Kurz as "no longer able to hold office", and demanded the People's Party nominate a chancellor with a clean record.

On 9 October 2021, Kurz announced his resignation, with Alexander Schallenberg to serve as his replacement. As a result of the resignation, Kogler announced his intention to continue the governing coalition.
