= Sebastian Kurz =

Chancellor of Austria (2017–2019, 2020–2021)

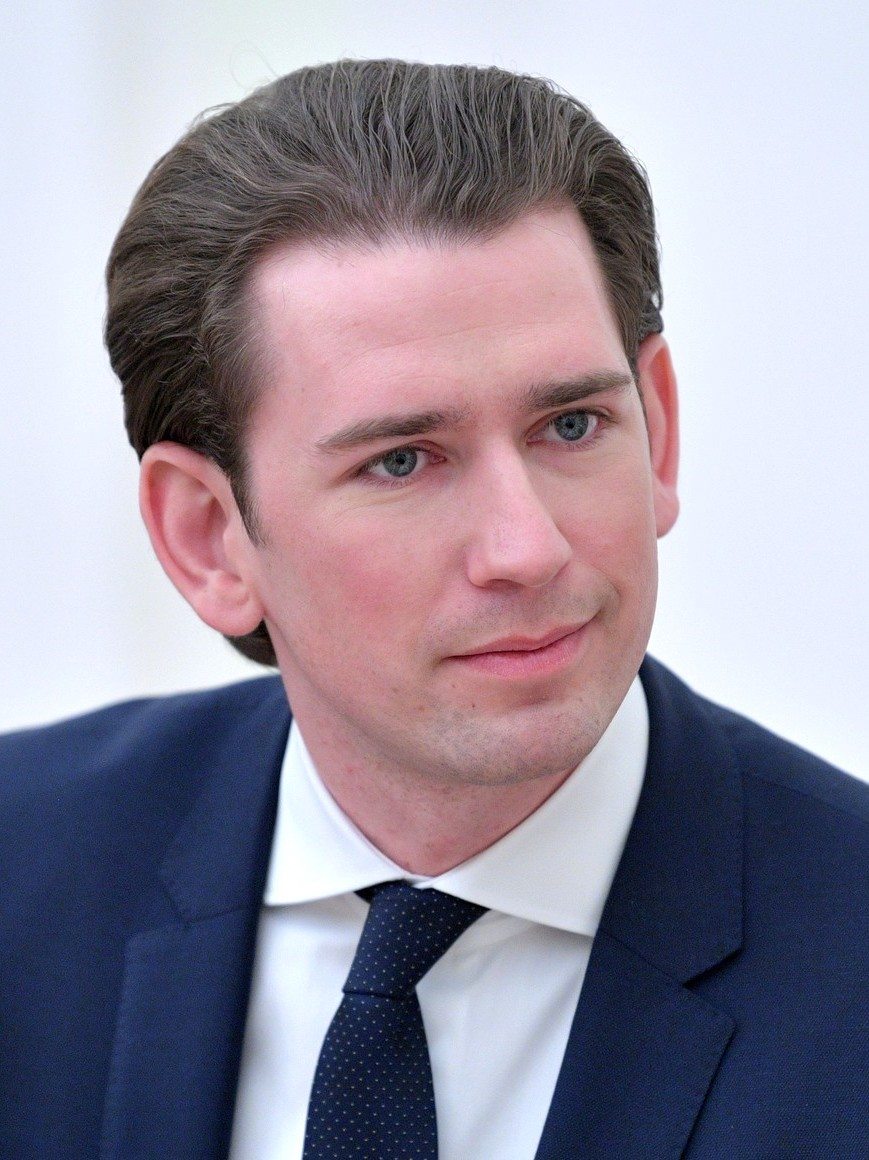
- Kurz in 2018

Chancellor of Austria
- In office 7 January 2020 – 11 October 2021
- President: Alexander Van der Bellen
- Vice-Chancellor: Werner Kogler
- Preceded by: Brigitte Bierlein
- Succeeded by: Alexander Schallenberg
- In office 18 December 2017 – 28 May 2019
- President: Alexander Van der Bellen
- Vice-Chancellor: Heinz-Christian Strache; Hartwig Löger
- Preceded by: Christian Kern
- Succeeded by: Brigitte Bierlein

Chairman of the People's Party
- In office 14 May 2017 – 3 December 2021
- Preceded by: Reinhold Mitterlehner
- Succeeded by: Karl Nehammer

Minister of Foreign Affairs
- In office 16 December 2013 – 18 December 2017
- Chancellor: Werner Faymann; Christian Kern
- Preceded by: Michael Spindelegger
- Succeeded by: Karin Kneissl

Personal details
- Born: 27 August 1986 (age 40) Meidling, Vienna, Austria
- Party: ÖVP (2003–present)
- Domestic partner: Susanne Thier
- Children: 2
- Parents: Josef Kurz (father); Elisabeth Döller (mother)
- Education: GRG 12 Erlgasse (Matura)
- Cabinet: Faymann I; Faymann II; Kern; Kurz I; Kurz II
- Website: Official website; Parliament website

Military service
- Allegiance: Austria
- Branch/service: Austrian Armed Forces
- Years of service: 2004–2005
- Unit: Maria Theresa's Barracks

Sebastian Kurz (Note: Austrian German: [seˈbasti̯a(ː)n ˈkʊrts]) (born 27 August 1986) is an Austrian former politician who served twice as Chancellor of Austria, first from 2017 to 2019 and then again from 2020 to 2021.

Kurz was born and raised in Meidling, Vienna. He entered politics by joining the Young People's Party (JVP)—the youth wing of the Austrian People's Party (ÖVP)—in 2003 and rose through the ranks there over the following years. As a result of a cabinet reshuffle in 2011, Kurz received his first government mandate as state secretary responsible for socially integrating refugees. After the 2013 legislative election, Kurz became the country's foreign minister and remained its top diplomat until December 2017.

In May 2017, Kurz succeeded ÖVP chairman Reinhold Mitterlehner and ran as chancellor candidate of his party in the 2017 legislative election. He campaigned on modernizing the Austrian political and bureaucratic apparatus as well as handling the social and immigration issues the country was facing after the European refugee crisis. His perceived reformist approach, rhetorical skills and youth were cited as the prime reasons for his landslide victory. Kurz was subsequently charged with forming his first cabinet. He opted for a coalition with the far-right Freedom Party of Austria (FPÖ). During his first chancellorship, Kurz was credited with mostly following through on his campaign pledges, but his leadership style was widely criticised as uncooperative and hasty. Several political scandals, culminating with the Ibiza affair in 2019, ended the ÖVP–FPÖ coalition. As a result of him no longer commanding the support of Parliament, Kurz and his cabinet were ousted.

Following the 2019 snap election, he returned to power and formed a coalition with the environmentalist Green Party this time. Kurz and his second cabinet were inaugurated in January 2020. Their agenda, however, was swiftly put in limbo by the surging COVID-19 pandemic. His response to the pandemic included lockdowns and curfews. An investigation into the Ibiza affair by a parliamentary subcommittee, an unstable Cabinet plagued by resignations, and ultimately a corruption inquiry, forced Kurz to resign the chancellorship in October 2021. However, remaining party chair and parliamentary leader allowed him to retain control over government affairs, and thus he came to be known as "shadow chancellor". Two months later, Kurz quit politics entirely and started working as a global strategist for Peter Thiel.

Kurz was the youngest chancellor in Austrian history as well as the youngest head of government in the world for about four years. His youth and political tenor were credited with revitalizing the traditional conservative movement in Austria and in Europe.

== Personal life ==
Kurz was born on 27 August 1986 in Vienna, the only child of Elisabeth (née Döller) and Josef Kurz. His father is an engineer and his mother is a grammar school teacher. Kurz's maternal grandmother Magdalena Müller, born in 1928 in Temerin, Kingdom of Serbs, Croats and Slovenes (today Vojvodina, Serbia), is a Danube Swabian who fled from the city and settled in Zogelsdorf (modern Austria) during World War II, after the Yugoslav Partisans and the Red Army started to regain the territory that was then occupied by the Kingdom of Hungary. Kurz was brought up in Meidling, the 12th district of Vienna, where he still lives. He obtained his Matura certificate from GRG 12 Erlgasse in 2004, completed compulsory military service in 2005, and began studying law at the University of Vienna the same year. Later, he dropped out of university and focused on his political career. Kurz is in a relationship with economics teacher Susanne Thier; they have two sons together.

== Early career ==
=== Youth branch ===
Kurz had been a member of the Young People's Party (JVP) since 2003 and was 'sponsored' by Markus Figl. From 2008 to 2012, he was chairman of Young People's Party of Vienna. As chairman, he led the youth arm of the electoral campaign of the Austrian People's Party (ÖVP) into the 2010 Viennese state election and coined the electoral campaign's controversial slogan "black makes [you] horny" (Schwarz macht geil), a play on the official party color and the colloquial term "geil" which can mean both "cool" and "horny". Kurz used a black painted SUV termed the "Geilomobil" (cool/horny automobile) for official campaign trips in Vienna. Kurz was elected chairman of the Austrian JVP at a federal party convention in 2009, where he received 99 percent of the vote; five years later he was reelected with 100 percent. In 2017, attorney Stefan Schnöll succeeded Kurz as chairman. From 2009 to 2016, Kurz served as a deputy co-chair of the Viennese People's Party. From 2010 to 2011, he was a member of the Viennese State and Municipality Diet, where he focused on "generational equality and fair pensions", before being nominated as state secretary of the Ministry of the Interior for integration in June 2011, ensuing a reshuffle of the first Faymann cabinet. Following the 2013 Austrian legislative election, in which he won the most direct votes of any candidate, he briefly served as a member of the Parliament. In December 2013, Kurz resigned his parliamentary seat to become the country's youngest foreign minister at age 27.

=== State Secretary ===
Kurz opined that a healthy and open relation between the government and religious communities was pivotal for social integration. During his first months as state secretary for integration, Kurz suggested several policy changes, including a second obligatory preschool year for students with poor language skills. In 2011, the Foreign Ministry, the Austrian Integration Fund and the Education Ministry launched the joint venture Zusammen:Österreich (Together:Austria), which aimed at familiarizing immigrants with Austrian culture and traditions, and sought to convey Western tenets, such as religious freedom and democracy. Zusammen:Österreich deployed integration ambassadors to public schools, who were responsible for furthering immigrant children's "identification with Austria" through dialog.

During his term as state secretary, Kurz received an annual budget totaling €15 million as of 2011. The budget was raised to €100 million by 2017. The surge was primarily the result of a large-scale expansion of German language classes by the government.

=== Foreign minister ===
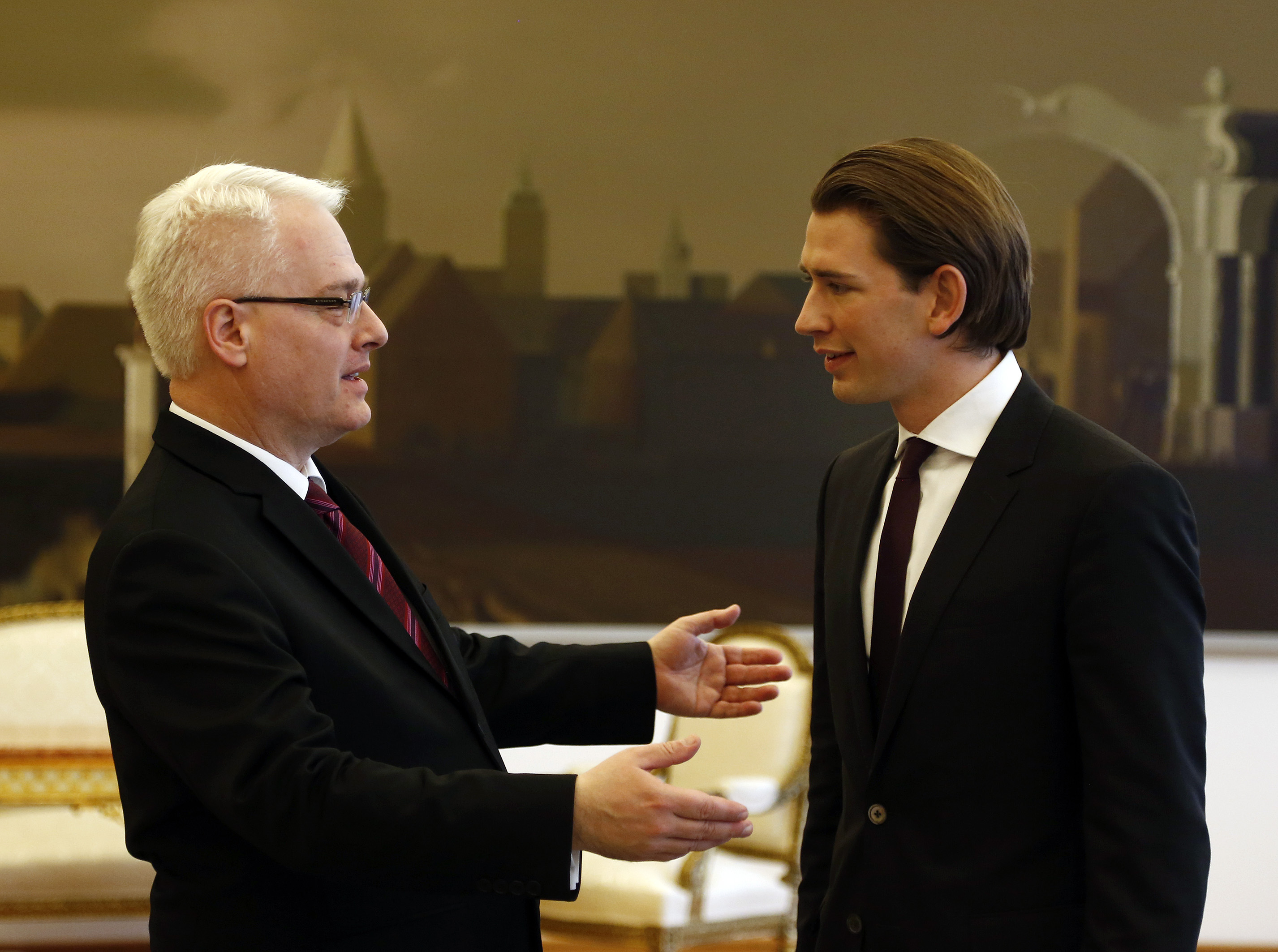
Kurz with the president of Croatia Ivo Josipović at his first foreign visit as minister, 20 December 2013

Following the 2013 legislative election, Kurz replaced Michael Spindelegger as head of the Foreign Ministry. In March 2014, the Foreign Ministry also became responsible for integration-related issues. Kurz declared the improvement of Austria's relation with the Western Balkans one of his top policy priorities. "For historical reasons" committed relations with Israel and the Jewish community were also 'imperative' to Kurz.

During a visit to Belgrade in February 2014, he reaffirmed Austria's continued support for the accession of Serbia to the European Union (EU), partly because of national economic and political interests.

In November 2014, Kurz launched the "#stolzdrauf" campaign, which sought to encourage people to display patriotism on social media. Among the supporters of the campaign were celebrities, such as the former Miss Austria Amina Dagi and musician Andreas Gabalier, according to the Frankfurter Allgemeine Zeitung. Former president Heinz Fischer, Austrian Airlines, the Jewish Community and the Islamic Religious Community were also involved in some form. The campaign was officially launched at a press conference which was later jeopardized by the alt-right identitarian movement. The amount of money invested by the Foreign Ministry on the campaign's promotion was heavily criticized; expenditures totaled €326,029 in only five to six weeks, 55% of which were spent on boulevard and free newspaper advertisements.

On 25 February 2015, Parliament passed an amendment to the Islam law. The changes bar foreign funding of Islamic religious associations, and were strongly criticised by the Muslim community. It also granted Muslims the right to pastoral care in the military, prisons, hospitals and nursing homes. A German translation of the Qur'an, which had been sought by Kurz, was not included.

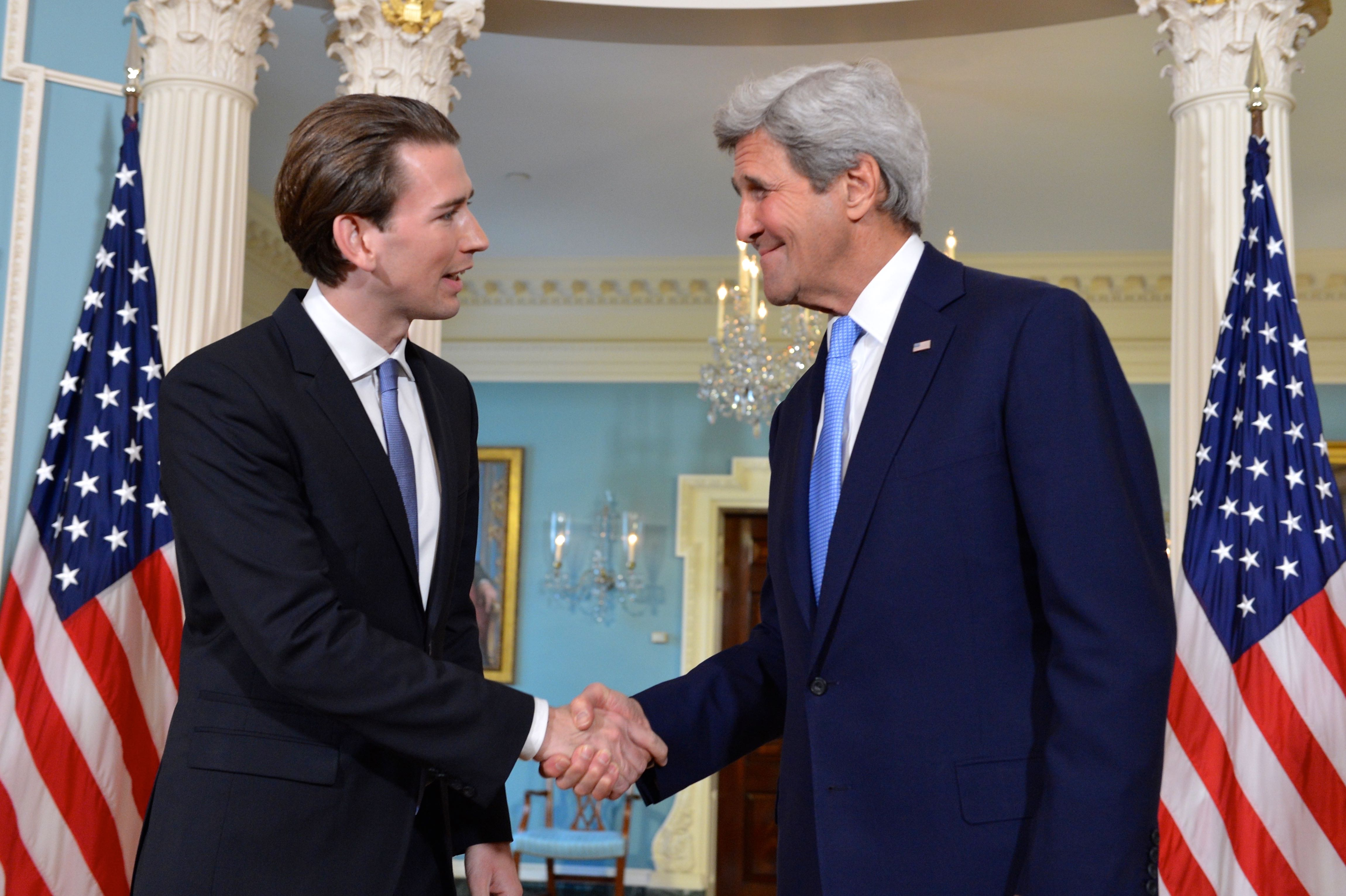
Kurz with the United States Secretary of State John Kerry, 4 April 2016

In June 2015, Kurz proposed to readjust child benefits received by foreign EU citizens – who work in Austria but whose children remain in their home country – so that it would match the price level of their country. In addition, European foreigners should "pay their fair share for a few years" before being eligible to enroll in Austrian social insurance programs. The Social Democratic Party (SPÖ) opposed this suggestion but agreed that the exploitation of child benefit programs needed to end. The Freedom Party (FPÖ) welcomed the proposal. The Green party accused Kurz of "adopting the FPÖ's hate mentality".

At the end of June 2015, Kurz introduced a long-term policy plan to shut down embassies in Malta, Latvia, Lithuania, and Estonia by autumn 2018 and simultaneously open new ones in Belarus, Moldova, Georgia, Qatar, and Singapore. His plans also included a second Consulate General in China.

In January 2016, in an interview with the daily newspaper Die Welt, Kurz stated "it is understandable that many politicians are afraid of 'ugly pictures' when it comes to border security. However, we cannot simply cede the responsibilities we have regarding our borders to Turkey, because we don't want to get our hands dirty. 'Ugly pictures' are unavoidable". The Green MEP Michel Reimon quoted the latter part in the caption of a photo showing the deceased refugee boy Aylan Kurdi, which went viral on Facebook. Reimon also referred to Kurz as an "inhumane cynic". An ÖVP spokesperson commented: "it is despicable that the Green party exploits the death of this little boy to promote their ideological stances"; Aylan had died at a time "where border security did not exist yet".

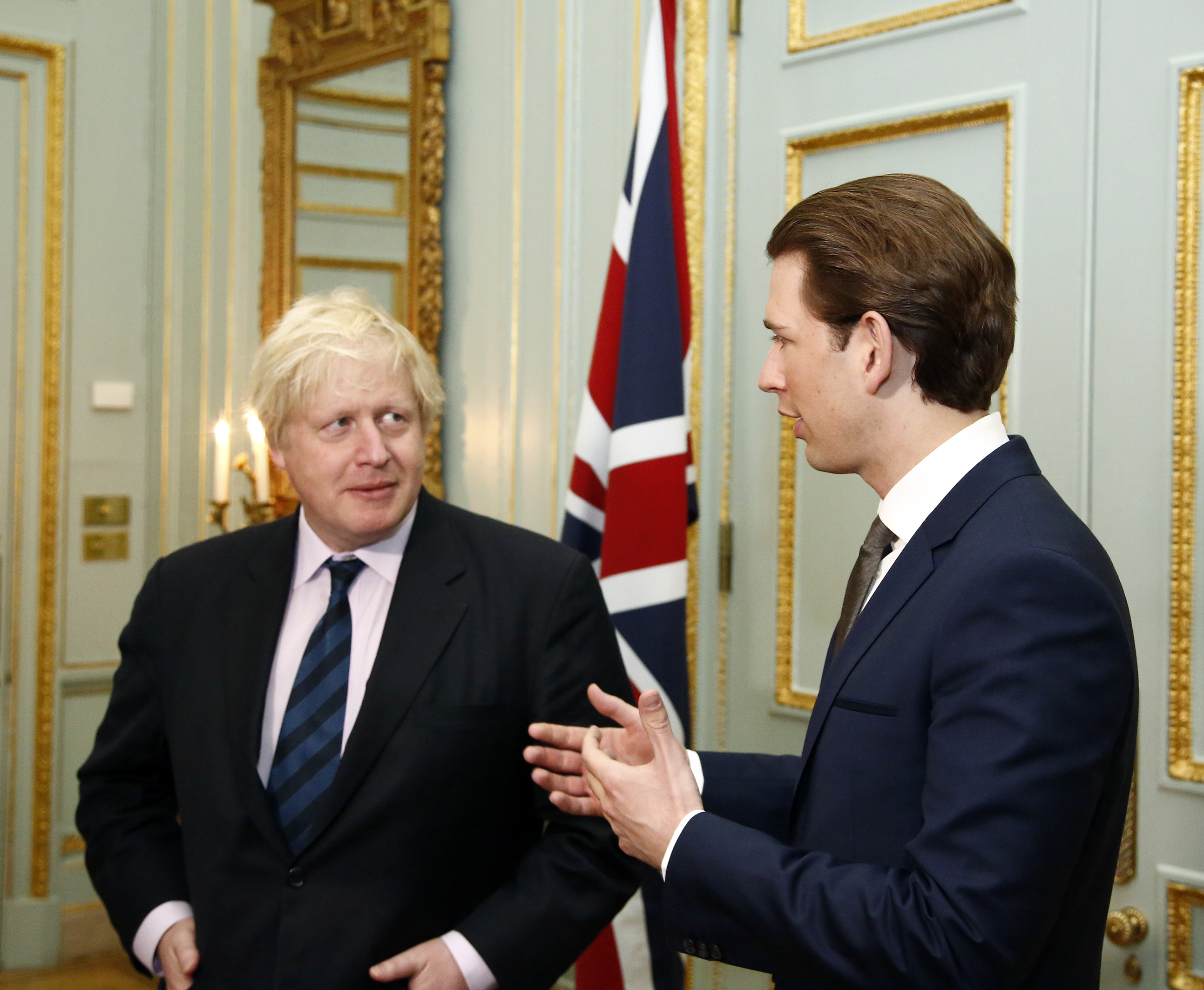
Kurz with Britain's foreign secretary Boris Johnson, 20 March 2017

The Foreign Ministry's Recognition and Evaluation Act was passed by Parliament in July 2016. It allows for the recognition of qualifications acquired abroad as well as the conversion of foreign academic certificates into domestic ones.

During commemorations and military parades to mark the end of World War II, Kurz visited Belarus on 5 May 2015, followed by a visit to Moscow where he met Russian Foreign Minister Sergei Lavrov. He described the annexation of Crimea and Russia's support of Eastern Ukrainian separatists as "contrary to international law". Kurz explained that a softening of EU sanctions would be declined without prior local improvements of the situation and that the implementation of the Minsk II agreement by Russia was imperative. He added that peace could only be achieved "with and not against Russia". In June 2016, he voiced his support for a proposal made by then-German foreign minister Frank-Walter Steinmeier to gradually withdraw sanctions in return for promises kept by Russia regarding the Minsk agreement.

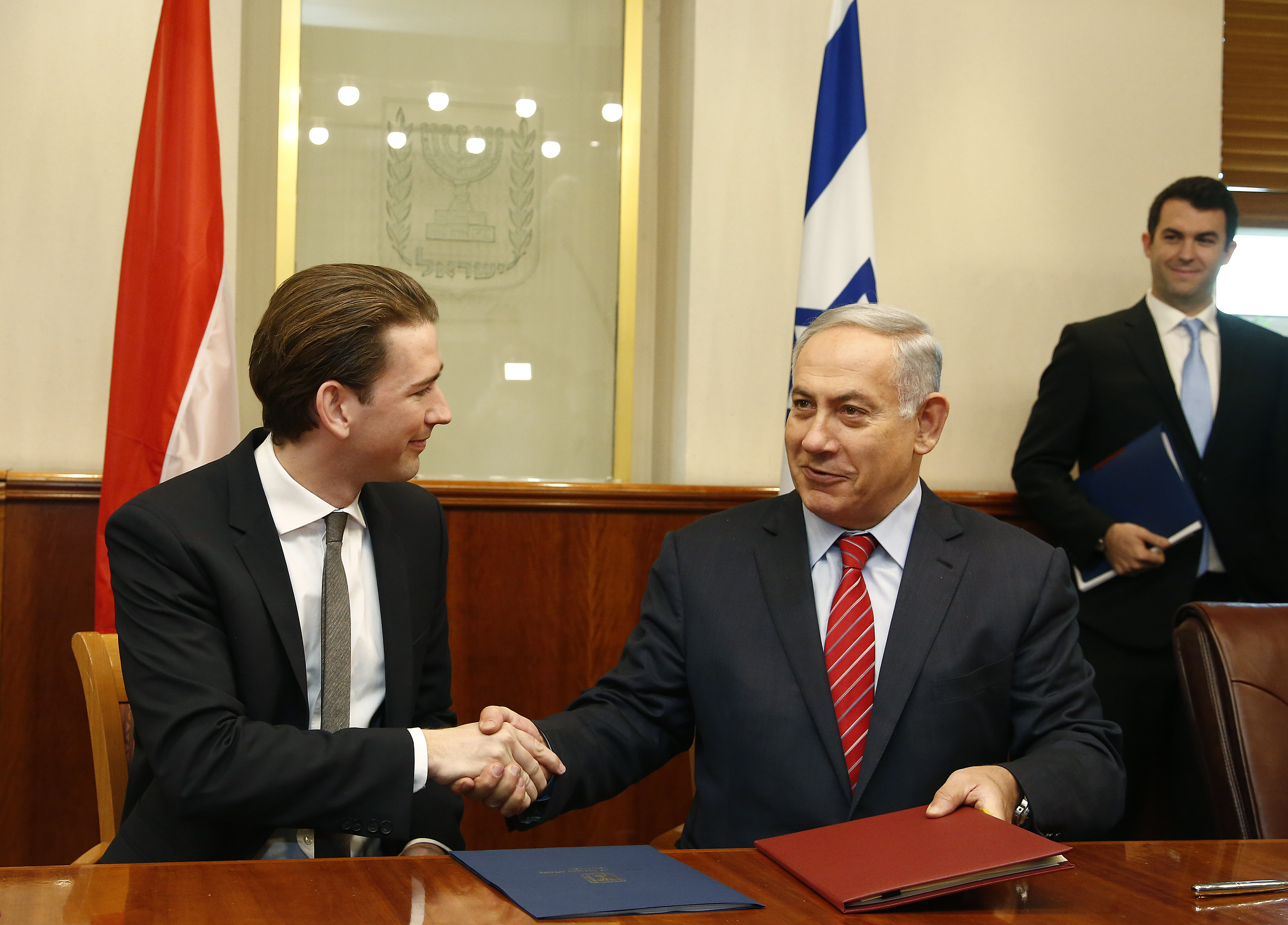
Kurz with Netanyahu after signing a memorandum of agreement, 16 May 2016. Netanyahu's spokesman David Keyes looks on.

In May 2016, Kurz visited Israel and met with Israeli prime minister Benjamin Netanyahu. The trip marked 60 years of diplomatic relations between Austria and Israel. Netanyahu and Kurz signed a working holiday visa agreement as well as several arrangements on bilateral educational and cultural issues.

In November 2016, Kurz expressed his gratitude as a representative of the European People's Party at a campaign rally of the Macedonian sister party VMRO-DPMNE for supporting the closure of the Western Balkans route, which was later criticized as an indirect election endorsement.

In March 2017, Kurz referred to rescue operations in the Mediterranean Sea as "NGO insanity", as these would "lead to more refugees dying instead of fewer". Intrigued by the Australian refugee model, Kurz repeatedly demanded that refugees rescued in the Mediterranean Sea should no longer be taken to mainland Italy, but transferred to refugee camps outside of Europe. EU border patrol agency Frontex supported his proposal, while most NGOs opposed it.

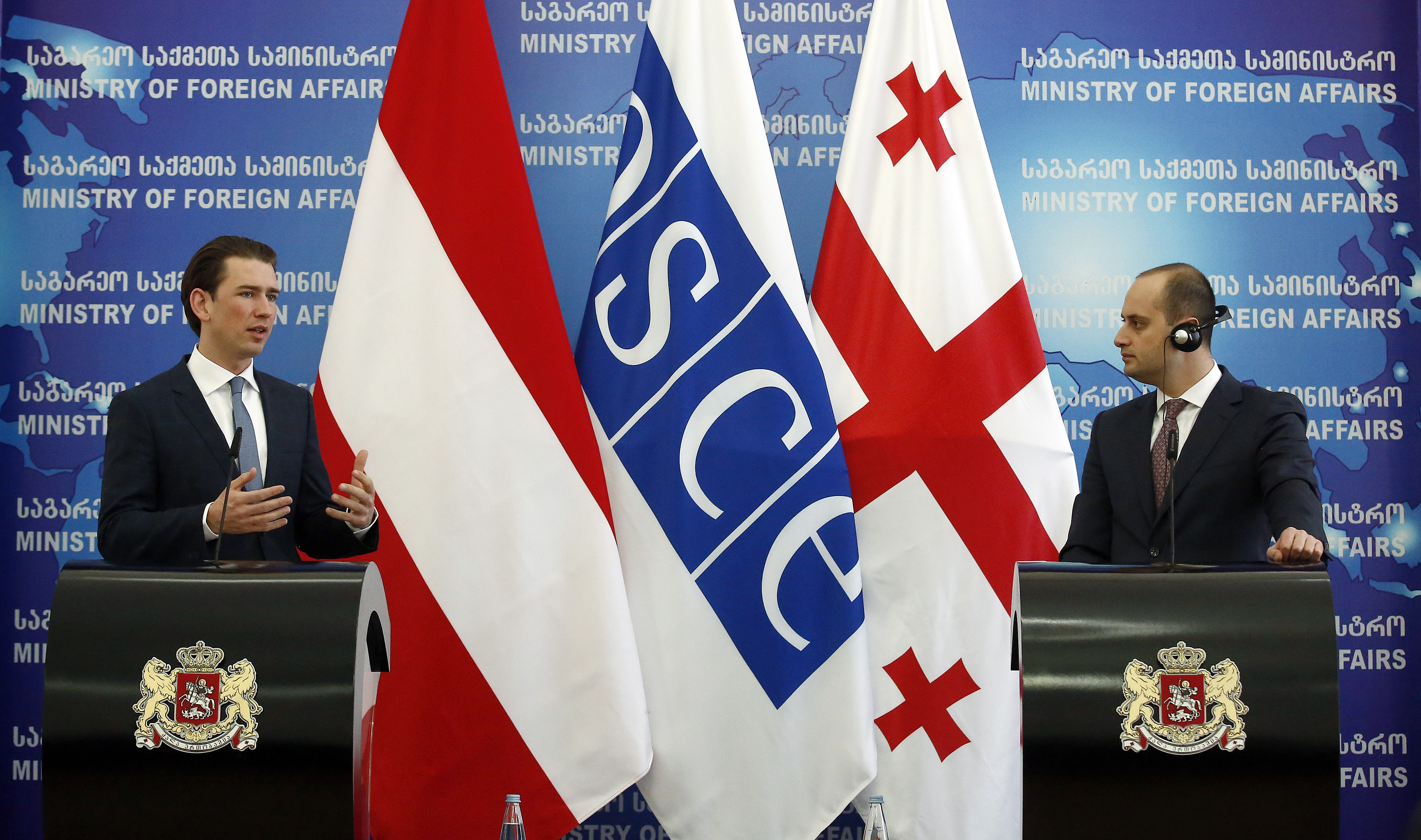
Kurz with Georgian foreign minister Mikheil Janelidze in Tbilisi in February 2017

In March 2017, the Council of Ministers approved the Integration Act, which was enacted by Parliament two months later. It introduced German language classes for immigrants as well as mandatory "language and value" courses for refugees, and prohibits the distribution of the Quran by Salafists in public areas. It also banned full-face veils in public spaces.

In May 2017, an integration ambassador criticized Kurz's immigration policy. According to a survey conducted by magazine Bum Media, two-thirds of the integration ambassadors disagreed with his policy objectives, especially the ban on full face veils.

Under Kurz's term, the cabinet agreed to up funds made available for a bilateral relations building from €75 to roughly €150 million by 2021.

At the end of 2016, the Foreign Ministry announced that it had discontinued governmental endowment of Südwind Magazin, which had been published monthly since 1979, for the association Südwind Entwicklungspolitik. This was widely condemned, as it put the magazine in grave financial peril and reportedly undermined freedom of the press in Austria. The publisher of the magazine considered the move "politically idiotic".

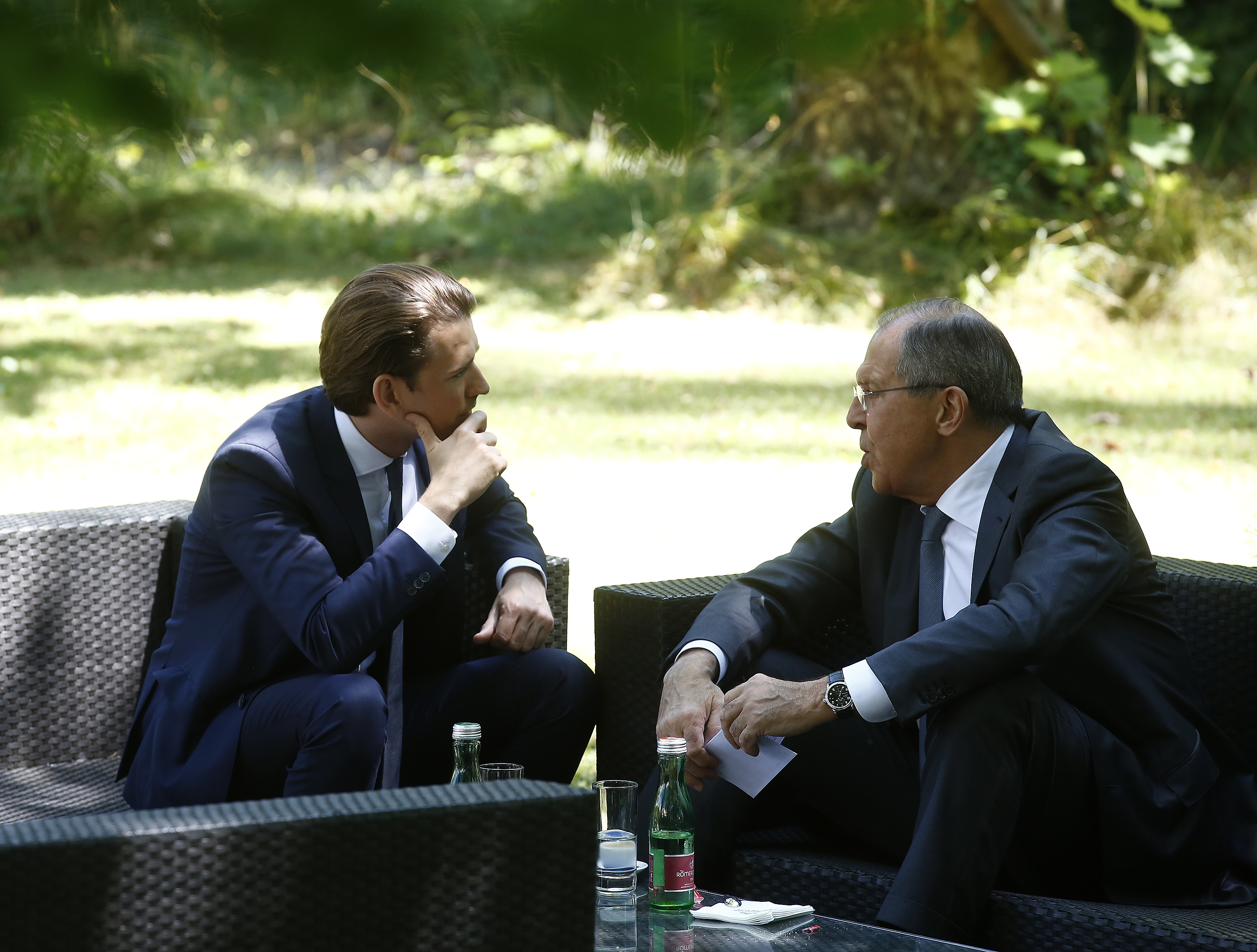
Kurz with Sergey Lavrov at the OSCE summit in Mauerbach

As foreign minister, Kurz assumed the yearly-rotating chairmanship of the Organization for Security and Cooperation in Europe (OSCE) in January 2017.

On 18 December 2017, Kurz stepped down as foreign minister to become chancellor. He was succeeded by Karin Kneissl of the FPÖ.

=== ÖVP chairmanship ===
In 2016, several news outlets speculated that Kurz would most likely succeed Reinhold Mitterlehner as chairman of the ÖVP before the 2017 legislative election, and run as the party's chancellor candidate. In 2014, the Kurier already predicted that Kurz would run for the chancellorship in the upcoming election. On 10 May 2017, Mitterlehner abruptly tendered his resignation as party chair and vice chancellor. Following Mitterlehner's departure from politics, the party's executive board nominated Kurz as the new chairman on 14 May. However, Kurz declined to succeed Mitterlehner as vice chancellor. Before his official confirmation, Kurz introduced the executive board with a list of demands, most notably the power to unilaterally craft the party's federal nominees' list for legislative elections. The Board consented to most of them, and some were even enshrined in the party bylaws. The Falter wrote that Kurz had already tested the waters regarding campaign funding before assuming the chairmanship and reported that large corporate donors pledged to endow his campaign with several millions of euros.

On 1 July 2017, Kurz was officially elected chairman of the ÖVP by a Federal Party Convention, garnering 98.7% of the delegates' vote and thereby falling just short of Mitterlehner's 99.1%.

=== 2017 legislative election ===
In the 2017 legislative election, the ÖVP competed under the alias "Sebastian Kurz list – the new People's Party". Besides Kurz, other nominees on the federal list (Bundesliste) were Elisabeth Köstinger, Josef Moser, Gaby Schwarz, Efgani Dönmez, Maria Großbauer, Rudolf Taschner, Tanja Graf, Karl Mahrer and Kira Grünberg. The first part of the election program, titled "New Justice & Responsibility" (Neue Gerechtigkeit & Verantwortung), was presented on 4 September 2017 and it promised tax cuts, advocated against assets and inheritance taxes and for a reduction of the minimum income obtained by people without Austrian citizenship. Already in June 2017, Kurz had announced that he would aim for a tax relief in the amount of 12 to 14 billion euros annually, counterbalanced by savings in the bureaucracy and "misguided social services", which would in particular affect child and family subsidy as well as the minimum income received by foreigners.

The second part of the program, presented nine days later, comprised economics, education, research, culture and the environment. It also aimed to replace compulsory school attendance with "compulsory education". Children shall "be able to comprehensively read and know the basics of math", otherwise compulsory school attendance shall be extended up until the age of 18. In addition, was to be a mandatory second kindergarten year for children with insufficient knowledge of the German language. And contributions to the social security system were to be reduced for people with lower incomes.

On 27 September 2017, Kurz presented the third part of the election program; "Order and Security". Anyone arriving illegally shall be returned to their country of origin. If someone requires protection, they shall be harboured in a Protection Center within a third-party country. It also asked for an improved scoring system (Punktesystem) for legal immigration. With regards to government reforms, it wished a more clearly defined separation of responsibilities between the federal government and the state and municipality governments. It also called for structural reforms within the EU, the implementation of the security compact and tougher punishments for violence against women and incitements.

== Chancellorship ==
=== First (2017–19) ===
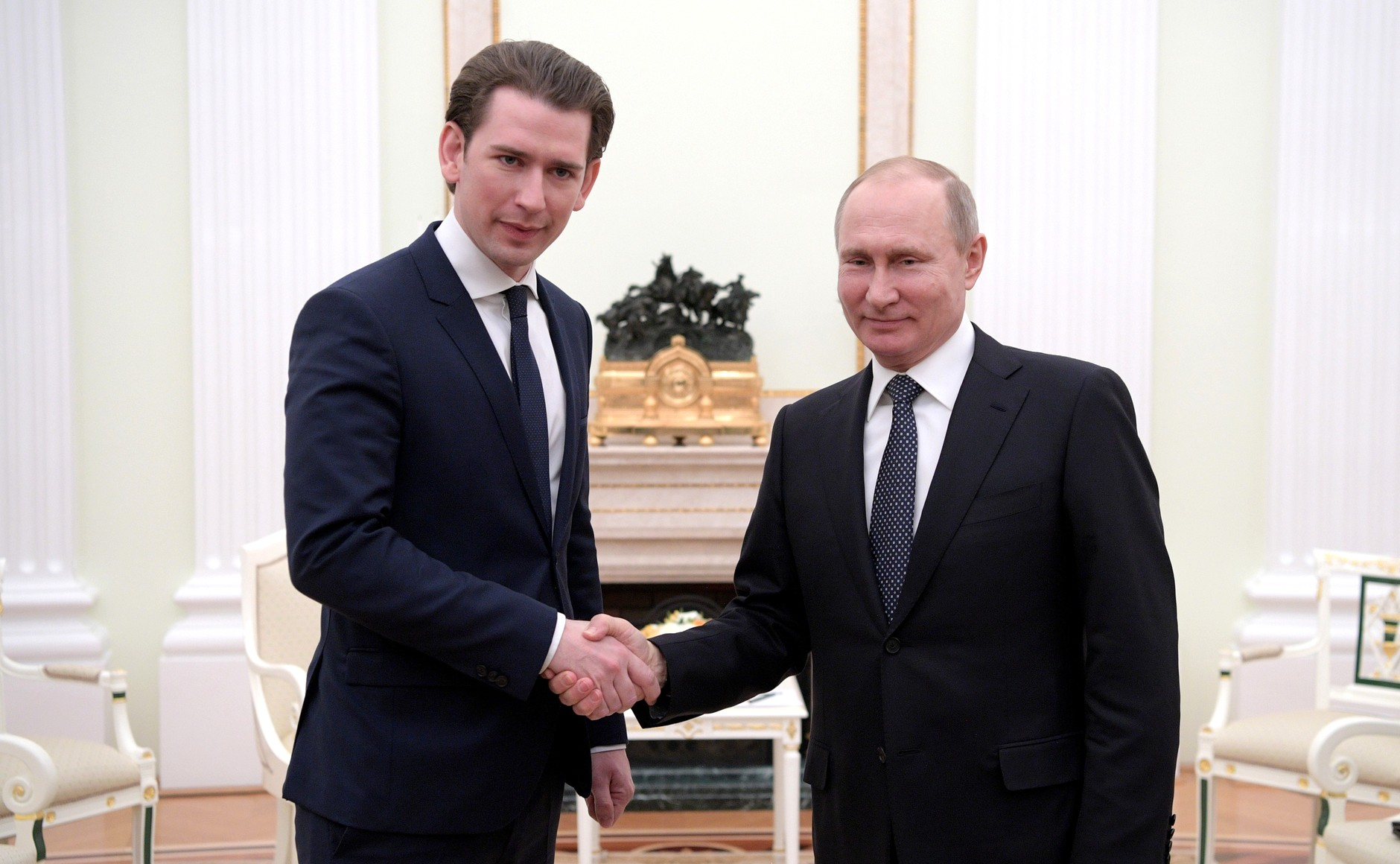
Kurz with Russian president Vladimir Putin, in Moscow on 28 February 2018

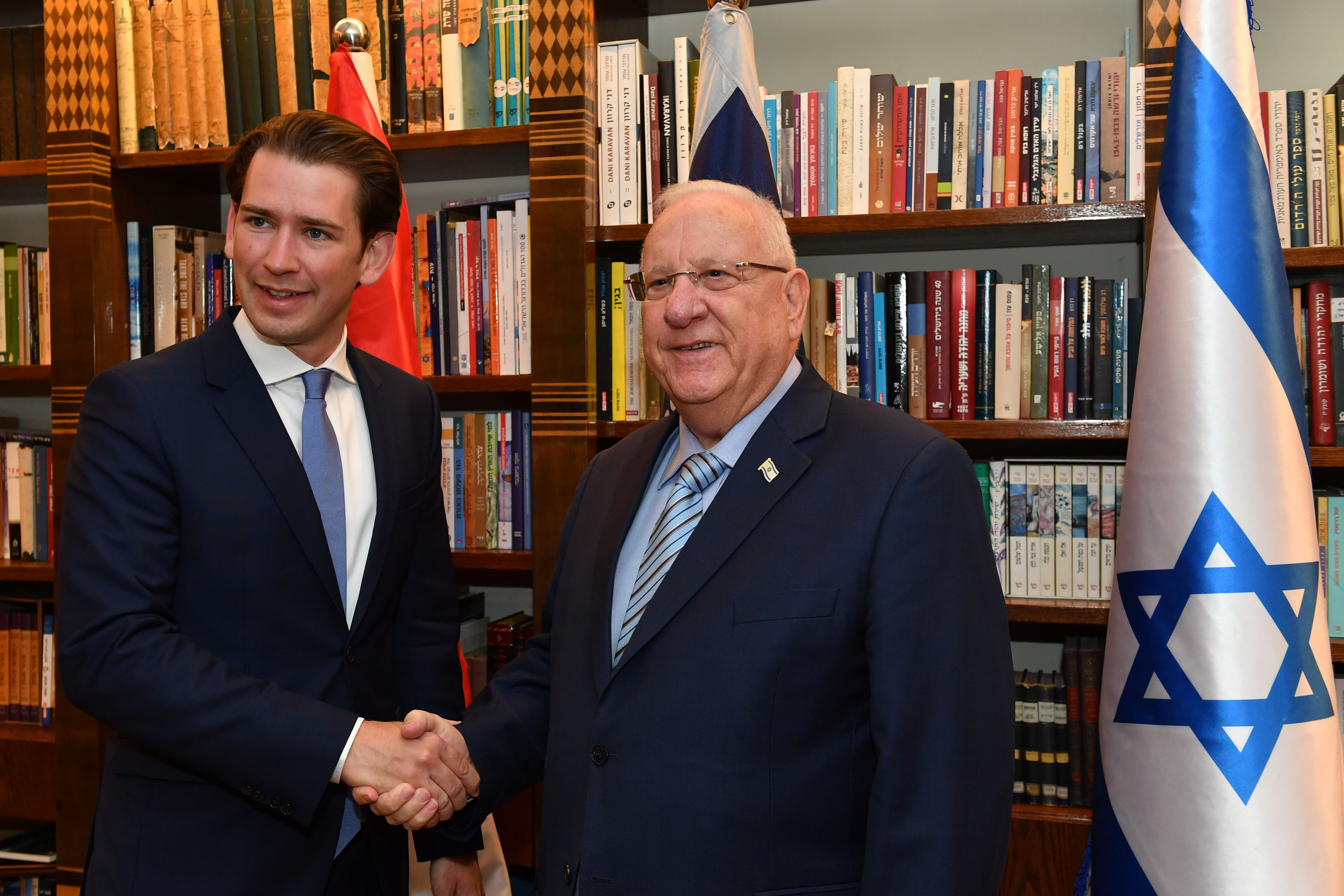
Kurz with Israeli president Reuven Rivlin, in Jerusalem on 12 June 2018

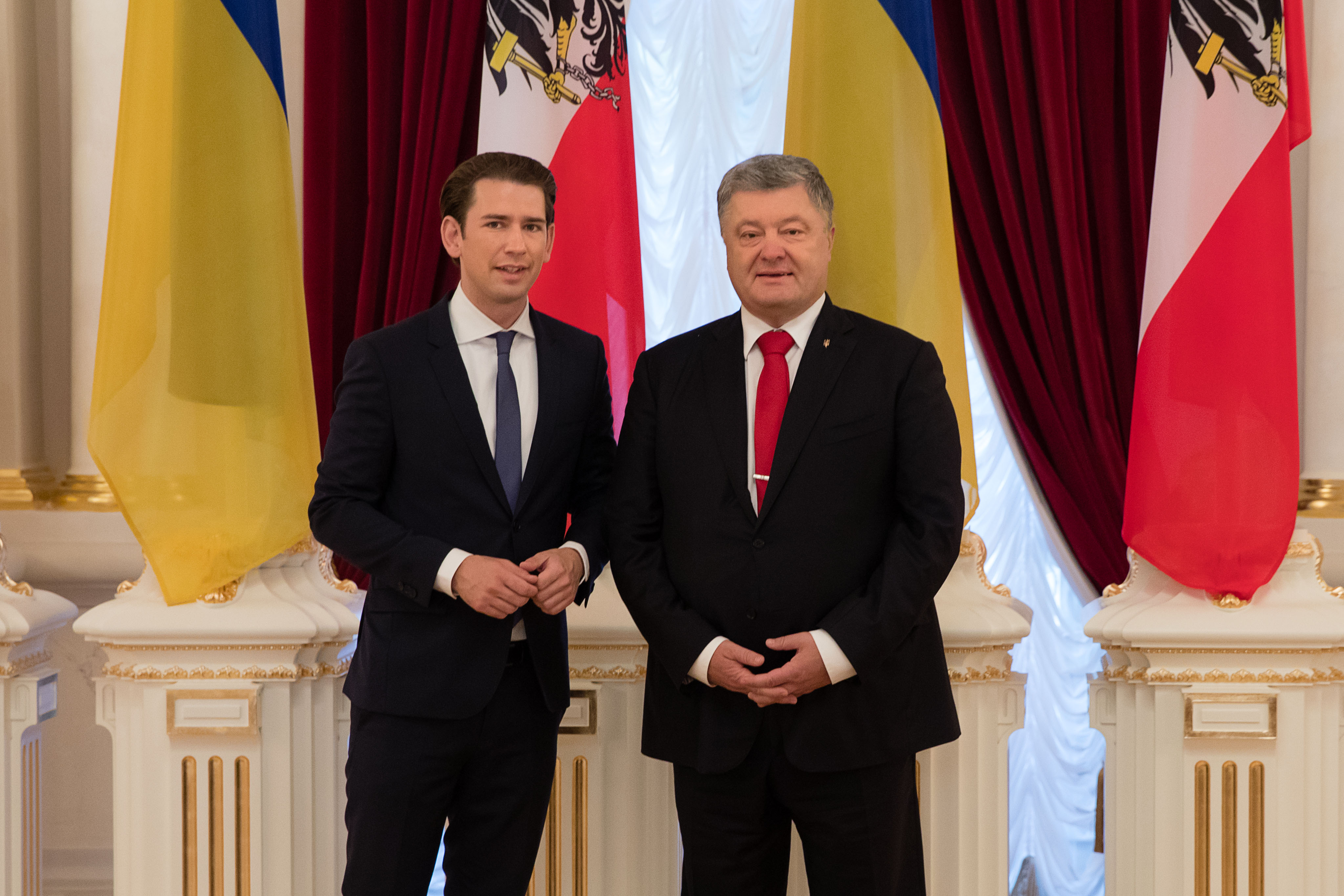
Kurz with Ukrainian president Petro Poroshenko in Kyiv, 4 September 2018

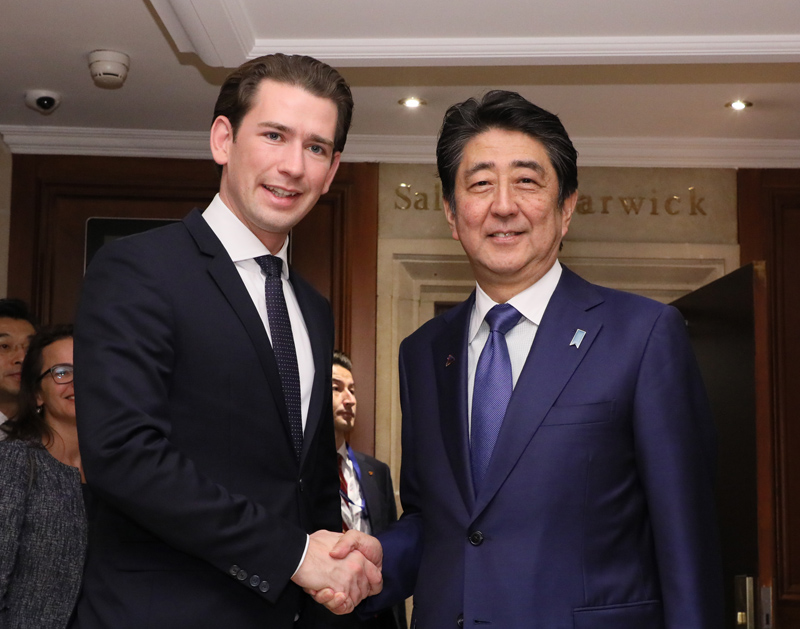
Kurz with Japanese prime minister Shinzō Abe, on 19 October 2018

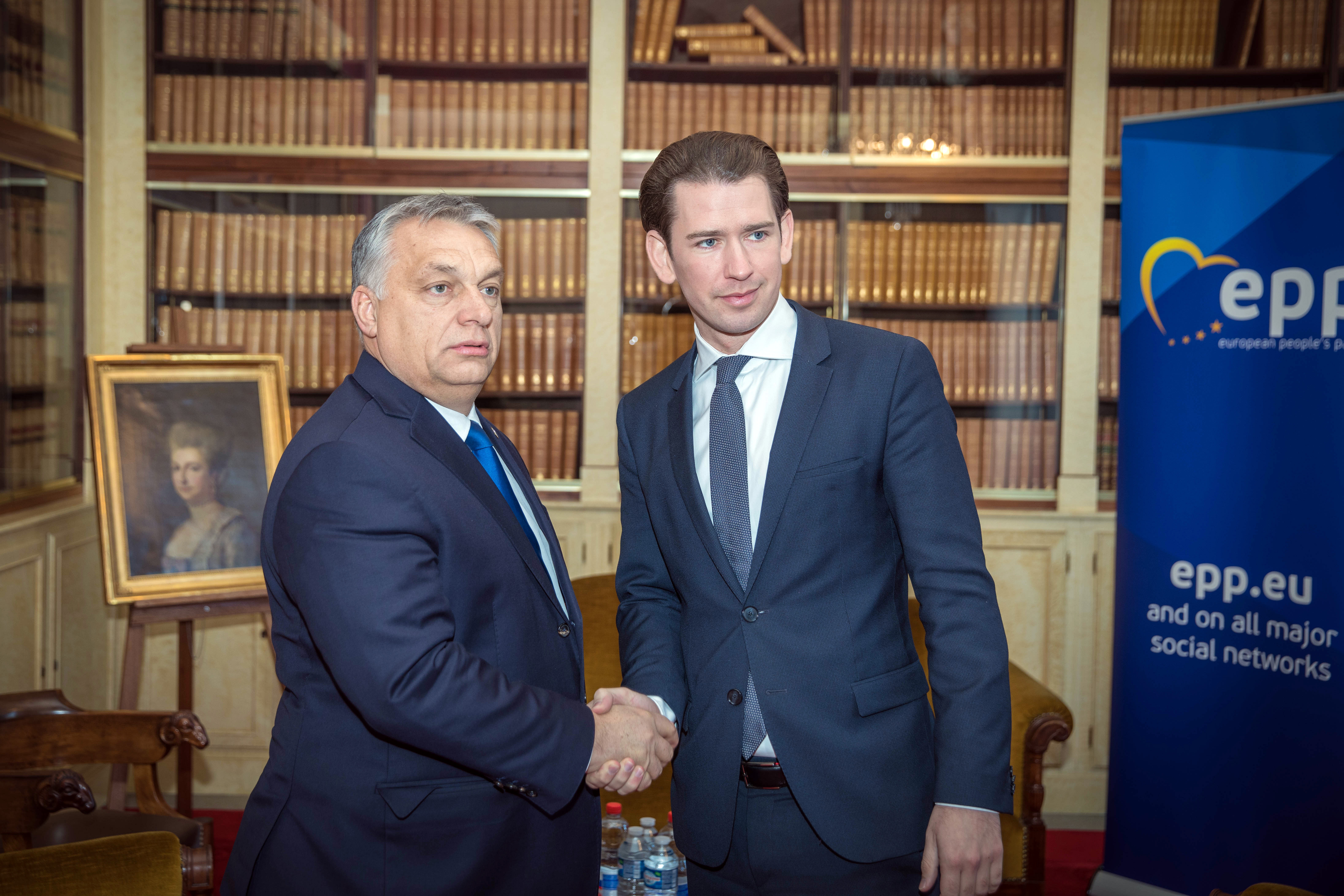
Kurz with Hungarian prime minister Viktor Orbán in Brussels, 13 December 2018

==== Appointment ====
On 15 October 2017, Kurz and his party emerged as victorious from the 2017 legislative election, receiving 1,595,526 votes (31.5%) in the popular vote and thus gaining 15 additional seats, and thereby a plurality, in the Parliament. As the leader of the party with the most seats after the election, Kurz was charged with the formation of a new cabinet by President Alexander Van der Bellen. Since he did not obtain an absolute majority in parliament, Kurz decided to look out for a coalition partner to ensure one. The search turned out rather quick and the ÖVP entered negotiations with the right-wing to far-right FPÖ on 25 October. Negotiations concluded successfully on 15 December and the incoming coalition presented its ministers list (Note: A draft determining how top government positions (chancellor, vice chancellor, ministers, and state secretaries) are to be filled. It is submitted to the President for confirmation by the person charged with the cabinet formation.) to the President. Van der Bellen assented and the Kurz cabinet was sworn in on 18 December 2017.

==== Cabinet composition ====
Under his first cabinet, Kurz received the chancellorship and five ministries, while the FPÖ received the vice chancellorship and six ministries.

It became the first cabinet with FPÖ participation in more than 10 years and – following the Ibiza affair – the first with technocratic participation in more than 90 years. It was succeeded by the first only-technocratic cabinet in Austrian history. Additionally, Herbert Kickl became the first minister to be removed from office against their will as well as the first person serving as party leader to be excluded from re-appointment by a president.

==== End of term ====
On 17 May 2019, the Ibiza affair came to public light. The scandal involved Vice Chancellor and FPÖ chairman Heinz-Christian Strache and FPÖ deputy chair Johann Gudenus, who were offered political support by a woman posing as the niece of Russian oligarch Igor Makarov. The incident was recorded on camera and later published by the Süddeutsche Zeitung and Der Spiegel. The videotape showcased the openness of Strache and Gudenus to engage in corruption, their willingness to violate Austrian campaign finance law, and their aspiration to bring nonpartisan news outlets under their control.

The revelation swiftly led to national and international condemnation. The following day both Strache and Gudenus resigned from all positions. Kurz supported keeping the cabinet on the condition that Herbert Kickl be replaced. As Interior Minister, Kickl (a member of the FPÖ) would have overseen the investigation into Strache and Gudenus. Additionally, following the revelation, Kickl quickly moved to appoint his close ally, Peter Goldgruber, Director General for Public Security – the supreme authority of Austrian law enforcement – thus causing further controversy and public concern. The FPÖ rejected Kurz's ultimatum. As a result, Kurz suspended the coalition agreement and asked President Van der Bellen to remove Kickl from office; the president assented. Following Kickl's removal, the remaining FPÖ ministers tendered their resignation, formally ending the coalition. Kurz filled the vacancies they left with technocrats.

By ending the coalition, Kurz no longer commanded a majority in Parliament. On 27 May, the SPÖ became the first party to officially introduce a motion of no confidence against the entire cabinet (including Kurz). With the concurrence of JETZT and the FPÖ, the resolution received sufficient support to pass. In the history of Austrian republicanism, it was the first motion of no confidence against a chancellor and the entire cabinet to be successful. The next day, the president officially removed all cabinet members from office; although everyone, except for Kurz, was immediately re-appointed to serve in an acting capacity. Finance Minister Hartwig Löger succeeded Kurz and served until he was replaced by Brigitte Bierlein and a caretaker cabinet less than a week later.

=== Second (2020–21) ===
==== Appointment ====
In September 2019, the ÖVP won the 2019 legislative election in a landslide, receiving 1,789,417 votes and 37.5% of the total valid votes cast, enough for a wide plurality in the Parliament. Consequently, Kurz picked up an additional nine seats in parliament. It was the second consecutive election in which the ÖVP emerged as the clear winner. As a result of the election, Kurz was again tasked with the formation of a new cabinet by President Alexander Van der Bellen on 7 October. Throughout October, Kurz held several exploratory meetings with the SPÖ, the FPÖ, NEOS, and the Green Party, which had experienced a grand comeback in the 2019 legislative election, after having dropped out of the Parliament following the 2017 election, and excluding the JETZT party, which failed to secure a minimum of 4 seats to obtain parliamentary representation. On 11 November, Kurz announced that the ÖVP would enter into coalition negotiations with the Green Party.

At the end of December it was reported that coalition negotiations had concluded successfully. The program for the new cabinet was introduced to the general public on 2 January 2020. The executive board of the ÖVP approved the coalition agreement the next day, the Green Party federal congress followed on 4 January.

Kurz was sworn in as Chancellor by President Van der Bellen on 7 January 2020 at 10:00 UTC. (Note: eleven o'clock ante meridiem Central European Time)

==== Cabinet composition ====
Under his second cabinet, Kurz received the chancellorship and eight ministries, while the Green party received the vice chancellorship and four ministries.

The second cabinet comprised significantly more partisan appointees and Kurz loyalists – e.g. both Blümel and Nehammer previously served as ÖVP general secretaries – than the first one. It was also the first cabinet in Austrian history that included the Green party and the first one with a predominantly female membership.

==== End of term ====
On 6 October 2021, agents of the Central Prosecutorial Agency for Corruption and Economic Affairs (WKStA) raided the Federal Chancellery and the headquarters of the ÖVP as part of a corruption probe targeting Kurz and his "inner circle". Prosecutors allege that Kurz bribed news outlets in 2016 to make anti-Reinhold Mitterlehner propaganda. The bribery scheme aimed at ousting Mitterlehner who served as then-vice chancellor and chair of the ÖVP, so Kurz could take his place. In addition, the WKStA accused Kurz of misappropriating tax payer money, as bribes were allegedly diverted from Finance Ministry funds.

Following the raid, opposition parties unanimously demanded Kurz's resignation and called a special session of the Parliament to vote on a motion of no confidence. The Greens pondered supporting the motion if Kurz was unwilling to voluntarily step down but were also supportive of continuing the coalition cabinet if Kurz was replaced. On 9 October 2021, Kurz resigned the chancellorship but announced his intentions to remain party chairman and assume direct leadership of the party in the Parliament. The Greens accepted Kurz's bargain, while opposition parties strongly condemned the move and said that Kurz would continue "pulling the strings".

On 11 October 2021, at 11:00 UTC, (Note: one o'clock post meridiem Central European Summer Time) President Alexander Van der Bellen officially removed Kurz from office and appointed his nominee then-Foreign Minister Alexander Schallenberg chancellor of Austria.

=== Shadow (2021) ===
Following Kurz's resignation as chancellor, news outlets, political analysts and the general public briefly referred to him as "shadow chancellor" – who continued to be, in effect, chief of government – albeit Kurz himself disavowed that label. As leader of the senior party of the coalition cabinet, Kurz remained the leading lawmaker and held the power to introduce motions of no confidence at will. He indirectly retained control over most government ministries, as they were headed by partisan loyalists, who had continuously voiced their unwavering fidelity to him.

On 11 October 2021, Kurz was unanimously elected parliamentary leader of the ÖVP. Three days later, Kurz was officially sworn in as member of parliament. On 15 October, anti-corruption prosecutors filed an extradition request with the Parliament to lift his legal immunity; the ÖVP "welcomed" the request, as it would "allow Kurz to be vindicated of any allegations of corruption". In the first week of his chancellorship, Alexander Schallenberg reaffirmed that he sought a close cooperation with Kurz, and that he would stick to the former chancellor's policy objectives.

On 16 November 2021, a parliamentary subcommittee unanimously voted to strip Kurz of his immunity; a plenary session formally enacted the vote two days later, allowing anti-corruption prosecutors to resume the criminal probe.

On 3 December 2021, Kurz resigned from all of his remaining positions and quit politics entirely. He was succeeded by Karl Nehammer as party chairman and August Wöginger as parliamentary leader. He cited his newborn son as the prime reason for this departure.

== Political actions ==
=== Social issues ===
Legislation	Cabinet	Parliament	Concurrence	Date effective	Ref.
Family Bonus Plus Act	13 June 2018	4 July 2018	ÖVP, FPÖ	1 January 2019	
Social Security Act	13 March 2019	25 April 2019	ÖVP, FPÖ	1 April 2019	
Social Insurance Reform Act	24 October 2018	13 December 2018	ÖVP, FPÖ	1 January 2020	

==== Family Bonus Plus Act ====
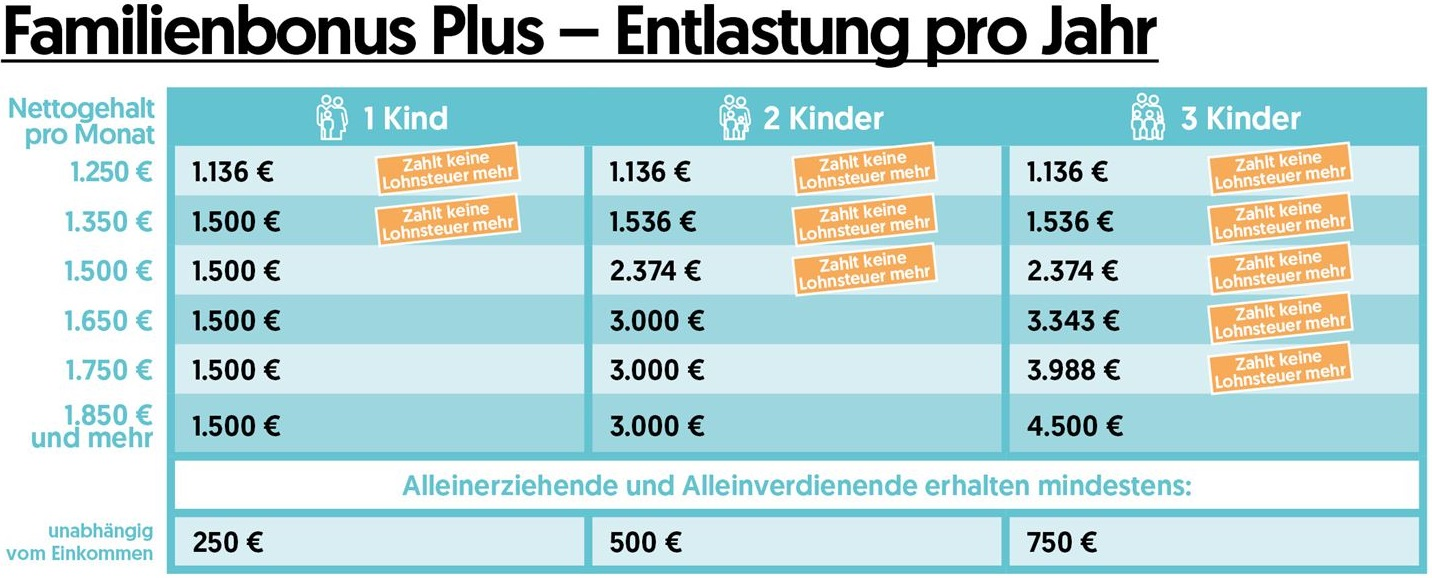
The Family Bonus Plus table

In June 2018, Kurz introduced a social security reform package termed the Family Bonus Plus Act, which was passed by the Parliament in July and became effective in January 2019. The act offers annual income tax deductions for parents up to €1,500 per under aged child (€125 per month) and €500 per of age child. The act only affects parents who already receive child benefits from the government. If at least one parent has a monthly net income of €1,350, parents become eligible for the maximum deductible amount of €1,500 per anum. The minimum deductible amount is €250 and can be claimed by every employed single parent, regardless of their monthly income; unemployed parents are ineligible for deductions.

Additionally, the Family Bonus Plus Act supersedes multiple other child benefit programs, such as the Child Tax Credit which offered €600 and €440 direct grants, to couples and single parents respectively; as well as the Childcare Expenses Mitigation Program which offered parents €2,300 annually per child younger than 10 years old.

The SPÖ and welfare advocates starkly condemned the reform package for "solely benefiting the well off and completely omitting the low earners and unemployed".

==== Social Security Act ====
In November 2018, the Cabinet completed drafting a major overhaul bill – affecting the basic income and unemployment insurance laws – known as the Social Security Act. Parliament enacted the bill in March 2019 and it took effect the following month. The act 'federalizes' the basic income; it sets the fundamental rules and minimum standards, while authorizing state governments to create local ordinances that regulate the details.

The Social Security Act introduces a nationwide basic income ceiling at €863.04 monthly for singles and €1,208.26 monthly for couples. Under the act, parents receive a complementary €215 for their first child, €129 for their second one, and €43 from the third one onward. Foreigners now become eligible for the basic income after a registered five-years stay in Austria or if they previously served as employers. Immigrants with a meager understanding of the German language now receive a reduced basic income of €563 per month; Kurz argued that the difference of €300 would pay for their German language classes. Immigrants that improve their language skills to German level B1 or English level C1 become qualified for the ordinary basic income. Furthermore, all recipients (except for the permanently unemployable) now have to re-apply for the basic income on an annual basis.

==== Social Insurance Reform Act ====
On 13 December 2018, as part of Kurz's campaign promise to modernize Austrian public administration, Parliament enacted a major social insurance overhaul bill introduced by his cabinet; the Social Insurance Reform Act. The bill attempts to wind down redundant bureaucratic processes by merging social insurers, laying off "superfluous functionaries", and modernizing workplaces. Kurz explained that "centralizing the social insurance system will considerably benefit the insured".Implementation began in April 2019, under the supervision of an ad hoc subcommittee of Parliament, and concluded in 2020, rendering the act fully effective.

Austria has a national, publicly funded health system. Although health insurance was always national, the system was originally administered by state-level insurers.

The act merges the state-level general and specialised insurances into a federalized, single-payer healthcare system (ÖGK). Social Insurance for Commerce (SVA) was merged with the Social Insurance for Agriculture (SVB) to form the Social Insurance of the Self-employed and Freelancers (SVS). Accident Insurance of Public Servants, Accident Insurance for Railroads and Mining and the Viennese Health Insurance for Public Transport were merged to create Accident Insurance for Public Servants, Railroads and Mining.

The Government Pension Fund (PVA) and the General Accident Insurance (AUVA) remain unchanged. While the Social Insurance Association, which oversees all social insurances, was disempowered and cut down.

All opposition parties, the chairman of the Social Insurance Association and various insurance and welfare experts decried the changes, commenting "the bill would not centralize but decentralize and harm an effective and perfectly functional system, and are hence disadvantageous to the insured". The mergers cost the government approximately €300 to €400 million.

=== Immigration ===
Legislation	Cabinet	Parliament	Concurrence	Date effective	Ref.
Compulsory German language classes	18 April 2018	16 May 2018	ÖVP, FPÖ	1 January 2019	
Child Benefits for Foreigners Reform Act	2 May 2018	24 October 2018	ÖVP, FPÖ	1 January 2019	

==== Compulsory German language classes ====
On 16 May 2018, the Kurz cabinet enacted compulsory German language classes in the Parliament.

As of 1 January 2019, all primary (Volksschule) and secondary schools (Hauptschule, Gymnasium) are legally required to establish mandatory German language classes (which deviate from regular classes) for children lacking a knowledge of the German language, denoted "extraordinary students"; however, such classes are only arranged in a school which has a minimum of eight such pupils. Extraordinary students are identified by a nationwide test (administered by the principal) when they register at the school, or when they enter the school during the school year and are new to Austria. Further ministerial tests each semester would assess their language. When tests assess them as having an "insufficient" knowledge of the German language, pupils are obliged to attend German language classes for fifteen hours per week in primary schools and twenty hours per week in secondary schools. Extraordinary students are to attend these classes for up to a maximum of four semesters or until such ltime as they are reassessed as having reached an "inadequate" knowledge of the German language. Such students would attend subjects such as drawing, music, gymnastics and handicrafts along with their original regular class.

The new law replaced a previous Act, which had allowed pupils to voluntarily attend German language classes for eleven hours per week. Cabinet argued that the previous law was not effective enough in achieving the results desired. The new initiative faced great opposition from schools, their representatives and the opposition parties. Opponents argued that schools in Vienna alone would require 500 additional rooms. Other objections raised were that "extraordinary students" might face discrimination, that many teachers did not have the necessary training, that costs of implementation would be considerable and that all "extraordinary students" would be taught in the same class regardless of their age, thus preventing efficient learning.

==== Child Benefits for Foreigners Reform Act ====
In October 2018, the Kurz cabinet passed the Child Benefits for Foreigners Reform Act. The bill affects foreign citizens of the European Union (EU) that are employed in Austria, but whose children reside in their home country. The act adjusts child benefits received by these foreign workers to the local price level of their home country. Civil workers – such as nurses – are especially pertained by the changes.

The European Commission decried the bill and reminded that EU laws expressly disallowed favoring domestic workers over European foreign. The commission announced its intention to file a civil suit against Austria in the European Court of Justice.

==== Migrant restrictions ====
In February 2016, Kurz's government moved to cap the number of immigrants and refugees to 3,200 a day. Additionally, asylum claims were limited to 80 per day. The European Commission called the moved "plainly incompatible" with international law. Despite the criticism Austria moved ahead the policy.

On 31 October 2018, Kurz declared that Austria would not join the Global Compact for Migration, claiming it would encroach on the country's sovereignty and fail to demarcate illegal (economic migration) from legal immigration (asylum).

Under Kurz, Austria was averse to allowing migrants to travel through Austria or allowing them to settle within Austria's borders. In 2018, the legislature passed the Aliens Law Amendment Act to restrict the ability of movement and independence of refugees. For example, cash could be confiscated to subsidize asylum care and security forces were given broader discretion to detain migrants over security risks. Further phones could be confiscated and geo-located to determine a migrant's origin and if EU regulations allowed them to be sent back.

=== Miscellany ===
Legislation	Cabinet	Parliament	Concurrence	Date effective	Ref.
Working Hours Reform Act	n/a	7 July 2018	ÖVP, FPÖ, NEOS	1 September 2018	
Monitoring Compact	21 February 2018	20 April 2018	ÖVP, FPÖ	1 June 2018	
Repeal of the smoking ban	n/a	22 March 2018	ÖVP, FPÖ	22 March 2018	
Reinstatement of the smoking ban	n/a	2 July 2019	ÖVP, SPÖ, NEOS, JETZT	1 November 2019	

==== Working Hours Reform Act ====
In July 2018, the Kurz cabinet passed an amendment to the working time law (Arbeitszeitgesetz) in the Parliament, which has commonly been referred to as the "12 hour work day" (12-Stunden-Arbeitstag). Cabinet skipped the common assessment process (Begutachtungsprozess) for the amendment. The average work time in Austria was eight hours per day, the amendment extended the maximum work time of ten hours per day to twelve hours, and the fifty hours work time per week to sixty hours. Chancellor Kurz and his cabinet commented the changes with "legally allowing employees to work more a day on a voluntary basis. In theory, employees could legally decline an employer's request to work longer.

Prior to the amendment it has only been possible to work longer than ten hours per day in certain circumstances and with the explicit assent of the works council. Supporters of these changes have been the Economic Chamber and the Federation of Industries. Opponents on the other side, have been the SPÖ, the Peter Pilz List, the Chamber for Workers and Employees, and the Trade Union Federation. Opponents have raised strong concerns regarding the amendment, doubting that an appliance of the "voluntary basis" is actually possible in practice, since they expect the employer to dismiss a denial of the employee to work longer and threaten them with suspension and discharge.

==== Monitoring compact ====
In April 2018, the coalition enacted the monitoring compact, officially titled security compact. The ÖVP already attempted to pass such a law in the previous legislative period, but failed since their bill presented before the Parliament was rejected by all other parties, including their current and former coalition partner.

The compact allows for authorities to monitor messenger services, such as WhatsApp and Skype, of a person that has committed a crime punishable with a maximum of ten years imprisonment, or five years when life and sexual integrity are endangered, or is suspected of being a potential terrorist. With the new compact, authorities would be empowered to order telecommunication companies to save a person's data up to one year if they are suspected of committing a specific crime. Should the initial suspicion not be substantiated throughout the investigation, then authorities' directive to store data would turn void and the surveillance target must be informed of their investigation. Furthermore, the optical and acoustic surveillance in the public are also planned to be expanded, and authorities would be able to access the video and audio surveillance of government-operated or funded organisations, such as public transportation services, airports, and railway stations, which are obliged to store recordings for a tenure of four weeks. The license plate recognition systems (Kennzeichenerkennungssysteme) are also intended to be advanced, with them being able to detect the driver, license plate, type and color of any car. IMSI-catchers used by the police would be able to localise phones without contacting the respective telecommunication company. Anonymous prepaid cards would no longer be available and only sim cards would remain, which require one to register their identity.

The compact would stand for five years and be evaluated after three years. Jurists, attorneys, the Constitutional Service and many others, have expressed their strong concerns regarding the compact and have accused it of infringing the very basis of liberty. Both the SPÖ and NEOS have announced to file one-third petitions in parliament to trigger a lawsuit against the compact before the Constitutional Court; the SPÖ aims to introduce its petition in the Federal Council, where it already possesses one-thirds of the seats, while NEOS would introduce theirs in the Parliament, hoping for the support of the SPÖ to derive the remaining votes necessary.

==== Digital Office ====
On 19 March 2019, the Kurz cabinet presented the mobile application Digital Office for Android and IOS as well as the website oesterreich.gv.at; both platforms combine and centralize existing online services of government that allow for citizens to interact with authorities through the internet. While both are generally the same, the mobile app was labeled "more comfortable" by cabinet. The concept for both platforms was drafted by Margarete Schramböck, Minister of Digital Affairs, and subsequently developed by her ministry. Digitalizing government services and bureaucracy has been an election promise of Kurz. The services data.gv.at and help.gv.at were merged into the new platforms, although data.gv.at is intended to additional remain as an independent website. The new platforms currently allow users to:

- register a new, and cancel the current, main residence (Hauptwohnsitz);
- request certificates for newborn children;
- store passport pictures;
- receive an automatic notification when a passport's validity expires; and
- request a voting card (Wahlkarte) for an upcoming election.

Additional services are intended to be added that would allow users to:

- request a new passport (June);
- register and cancel side residences (Nebenwohnsitze) (June);
- file a loss report for certificates and other legal documents (June); and
- use the digital driving license (December, at the latest beginning 2020).

The digital driving license would for the moment only be usable domestically, since there are no European-wide regulations for such licenses. Registering for those platforms requires a mobile signature. There currently are more than 1,1 million registered mobile signatures.

==== Council of the European Union presidency ====
During Austria's presidency of the Council of the European Union, which lasted from July to December 2018, Kurz advocated for an increased protection of the Schengen Area and suggested that Frontex border guards should prevent any migrant boat from entering Europe.

==== The smoking ban ====
In March 2018, the Kurz cabinet repealed a general smoking ban enacted by its predecessor, the Kern cabinet, which was slated to take effect on 1 May 2018. The reversal was a long-standing campaign promise and policy objective of the FPÖ, which insisted that it be included in the coalition agreement and the official cabinet agenda. Despite publicly supporting the smoking ban, the ÖVP reluctantly voted for its repeal in Parliament as part of this bargain.

The reversal remains one of the most controversial acts of Kurz's first chancellorship, as his own and all opposition parties, a dozen gastronomy and health specialists, as well as the majority of Austrians opposed it.

The smoking ban would have completely prohibited the use of cigarettes in all coffee shops and restaurants, which had previously still been allowed within designated smoking areas. However, as part of the reversal bill, the Cabinet also illegalized the sale of tobacco to minors and disallowed smoking in cars if children are present.

Following the end of the smoking ban, an anti-smoking campaign known as "Don't smoke" became viral. The campaign's anti-smoking plebiscite – that would have forced Parliament to reconsider the reversal – garnered more than 880,000 votes, which made up 13.8% of Austria's population at the time, and was one of the most successful petitions in the country's history. Nevertheless, it fell just short of the 900,000 votes threshold, which had been raised by FPÖ party chairman and Vice Chancellor Heinz-Christian Strache beforehand. Strache received massive amounts of criticisms for that, as he had pledged to hear any petition that reaches a scanty 150,000 votes while still in opposition. A lawsuit against the repeal was filed with the Constitutional Court.

Following the collapse of the first Kurz cabinet, Parliament reinstated the smoking ban in July 2019; all parties, but the FPÖ, voted in favor.

== Political positions ==
=== Islam policy ===
In February 2015, the right-wing government passed legislation to ban continuous foreign funding of mosques. Kurz received criticism from Muslims internally and abroad, including from Turkey's Erdogan. Kurz responded by insinuating Turkey's criticism came from the idea they would lose political influence. Saying, “It will not be possible in the future to have imams employed by the Turkish government.”

Under Kurz, the Foreign Ministry asked university professor and Islam specialist Ednan Aslan to create a study on Islamic kindergartens. A preliminary report, published at the end of 2015, came to the conclusion that Salafist sentiments among society were on the rise, and that there was a surging support for Islamist ideologies. As a result, the government of Vienna and the Foreign Ministry jointly agreed to conduct a more comprehensive, scientific study on the matter. In addition, the Viennese government began to vet Islamic kindergartens more carefully and subjected them to increased scrutiny. In June 2017, Kurz demanded that all Islamic kindergartens be completely shut down, as they had "isolated pupils – linguistically and culturally – from society". After a Falter investigation accused the Foreign Ministry of having changed specific contents of the study's report, stark public controversy emerged; Aslan backed the Ministry's version of the report. The University of Vienna launched a scholarly peer review.

Following the ban of full face veils by the Kern cabinet, which Kurz supported, his cabinet also passed a headscarf ban in kindergartens, and intended to expand the ban so that it would also cover elementary schools.

In 2018, Austria's coalition government announced the expulsion of 60 imams and their families. It also announced the closure of 7 mosques due to what it characterized as "political Islam." This included the taking of donations from abroad which had been banned in 2015.

In March 2019, the Cabinet announced its intent to establish a new government agency that monitors Islamic political activities in Austria. Referencing studies which show that a significant amount of Austrian Muslims hold anti-western and antisemitic views, Kurz said that it would be necessary to actively monitor Islamic mosques, clubs, and social media accounts in order to safeguard Austria's liberal, democratic and secular system. He suggested that this planned organisation should be modeled after the Documentation Centre of Austrian Resistance (DÖW) which is responsible for the surveillance of right-wing extremism. Key officers of the DÖW generally welcomed the government's proposition.

=== Same-sex marriage ===
A ruling of the Constitutional Court in December 2017 declared most provisions of the Registered Partnership Act to be unconstitutional and overturned them, which ultimately resulted in the legalisation of same-sex marriage in Austria. Both the ÖVP and FPÖ opposed same-sex marriage and previously rejected several bills introduced by the SPÖ, NEOS, and the Greens that would have legalized it prior to the court ruling. Kurz opposes same-sex marriage, and opined that inequality has already been eliminated with the introduction of registered partnerships. He commented: "the official recognition of homosexual couples and their right to adopt children already exists. Hence, legal discrimination is no more".

=== Counterproliferation ===
As foreign minister, Kurz was a vehement advocate of non-proliferation and supported denuclearisation efforts around the globe. He explained that "nuclear weapons are not only a threat to all of humanity, but also a dark piece of Cold War legacy, that must be resolutely overcome".

Kurz participated in a review of the Treaty on the Non-Proliferation of Nuclear Weapons and, in 2014, successfully organized his own international conference on nuclear disarmament in Vienna.

=== Economic policy ===
In his campaign pledges for the 2017 legislative election, Kurz spoke out against further raising the national debt and for reducing government spending and budget deficits; he intends to realize proposed policies through abolishing the fiscal drag (Kalte Progression) and by cutting the payroll and income taxes. Kurz opposes any sorts of inheritance, property, and wealth taxes. He wishes for cash to be retained as an ordinary payment method.

In December 2018, Kurz announced a nationwide digital tax to partly fund a major upcoming tax reform. The digital tax topic has previously been discussed on European level but no agreement came about.

=== Message control ===
As chancellor, Kurz instated a strict regulation to manage and oversee the communication of government and the ministries. The concept is intended to exhibit a uniform and almost synchronous appearance of government, of which no cabinet member could stand out through their individual views and stances. Journalists have accused the Kurz cabinet, through rejecting questions and by applying other methods of message control, of efforts to control and otherwise influence the media coverage. Kurz himself reduced his communication to short and often repeated sentences and keywords.

=== COVID-19 pandemic ===
The Kurz government introduced a litany of restrictions in response to the spread of the COVID-19 pandemic in Austria, undergoing three different lockdowns. On 16 March 2020, Austria instituted a nationwide lockdown, closing schools, restaurants, theaters and other "non-essential businesses". It was lifted a month later only to be reintroduced in November that same year. Austria entered a third lockdown after Christmas in 2020 accompanied by mass testing and limiting gatherings to no more than ten people. Kurz later tied reopening to vaccinations and announced the "Green Pass", a vaccine passport, in March 2021. Critics warned Austria was splitting society into have and have-nots and the legislation faced large protests.

== Public profile ==
Following Kurz's inaugural visit to Berlin as foreign minister, the Frankfurter Allgemeine Zeitung described him as "highly eloquent", "succinct", and "everything but sheepish", and nicknamed him the "young Metternich". In December 2014, the German Press Agency ranked Kurz as one of "the seven winners on the political world stage of 2014".

Anna von Bayern of Focus wrote that "one really notices the new and confident approach of the Foreign Ministry", adding that "Kurz bestowed upon it new relevance". In March 2016, Franz Schandl of Der Freitag described Kurz as someone who "puts on a friendly face" but is actually indistinguishable from a right-wing populist. In 2017, the Time magazine listed Kurz as one of ten "Next Generation Leaders", referring to him as the "statesman of a new kind", who found a way to deal with the European refugee crisis and whose pragmatic approach has been a "story of success adopted even by other European politicians". Die Welt described Kurz as a "conservative-liberal, European-minded politician", whose rise to power "in many ways resembled" that of French president Emmanuel Macron. The Neue Zürcher Zeitung praised Kurz as the embodiment of "progress, self-confidence, dynamism, elegance, and determination"; while German chancellor Angela Merkel was a "token of stagnation", Kurz was "sovereign, considerate towards his critics, and a rhetorical master of the German language" adding that "if Kurz were German, he would be chancellor, or about to be chancellor".

The Rheinische Post wrote "if we take a look at his supporters, Kurz strongly resembles Jörg Haider, the legendary right-wing populist, who set out to end the everlasting SPÖ-ÖVP rule over the country – and ultimately failed. What Kurz seeks to change, remains opaque even after his electoral campaigning. The only thing that's clear is that he wants to become Austria's youngest chancellor".

In June 2018, a commentary of Edward Lucas published by the Financial Times compared the modern political development of Europe and the United States with the political environment of the 1930s. Lucas explained that Kurz was "easily comparable" with U.S. president Donald Trump of the Republican Party and Italian Minister Matteo Salvini of the Lega Nord. Following publication, the Austrian Embassy in Washington, D.C. contacted Lucas and demanded that certain "inappropriate" parts of the commentary be redacted; Lucas complied. Other publications have called him "Austria's mini Trump". In December 2018, the term "silent chancellor" became Austria's Word of the Year for the second year running. The jury chose the word because "Kurz avoids commenting on issues that personally displease him and refuses to rebuke or justify contentious actions or statements made by the FPÖ, where the public would conventionally expect clarification from the chancellor".

In 2019 Kurz was first listed by Spiegel Online in the ranking "who will be important abroad?", explaining that "from an international perspective", Kurz had attracted considerable amounts of attention as he was "only 32 years old and governs with right-wing populists". As Kurz's coalition partner, the FPÖ "has pushed the moral boundaries. In the future, unfavorable views on foreigners, refugees, and migrants are likely to increase even more, because Kurz lets his coalition partner say bad things, but remains silent himself. Meanwhile, his job approval remains consistently high". In March 2019, Kurz was elected "word-keeper" of 2018 by the readers of the Deutsche Sprachwelt, and "silent chancellor" became the Austrian Word of the Year.

Kurz's response to the COVID-19 pandemic was soundly unpopular and resulted in a stark decline of his job approval rating; this combined with the corruption inquiry that concluded his political career caused his approval rating to plummet even further. At the end of 2021, the media consortium Organized Crime and Corruption Reporting Project named Kurz "Corrupt Person of the Year Finalist" in its annual contest.

== Post-politics ==
Since 2022, Kurz has been working as a global strategist for Thiel Capital, the California-based private investment company of American billionaire Peter Thiel. On 9 January, he was appointed co-chairman of the European Council on Tolerance and Reconciliation. In the same month, he started an investment management and consultancy firm, SK Management.

=== Dream Security ===
Later that year, he co-founded an Israel-based cybersecurity company, Dream Security, along with former chief executive of NSO Group Shalev Hulio. NSO Group is an Israeli cyber-intelligence firm, which is primarily known for its proprietary spyware Pegasus.

According to Bloomberg, the start-up raised 20 million US dollars in a funding round. The round was led by venture capitalist Dovi Frances.

On 23 February 2024, Kurz received an eight-month suspended sentence after being convicted of perjury by a court in Vienna over his involvement in a parliamentary inquiry. On 26 May 2025, his conviction was overturned by a higher court.

== Honours ==
Award or decoration	Conferred by	Date
Honorary Citizen	Burgschleinitz-Kühnring	10 January 2018
Jerusalem Navigator	European Jewish Congress	20 November 2018
Ludwig Erhard Token of Commemoration	Economic Council Germany	31 August 2021
Order of the Republic of Serbia	Serbia	4 September 2021

== Notes ==
Political offices
Preceded by Michael Spindelegger	Minister of Foreign Affairs; 2013–2017	Succeeded by Karin Kneissl
Preceded by Christian Kern	Chancellor of Austria; 2017–2019	Succeeded by Brigitte Bierlein
Preceded by Brigitte Bierlein	Chancellor of Austria; 2020–2021	Succeeded by Alexander Schallenberg
Party political offices
Preceded by Reinhold Mitterlehner	Chair of the People's Party; 2017–2021	Succeeded by Karl Nehammer
