= Alois Stöger =

Austrian politician

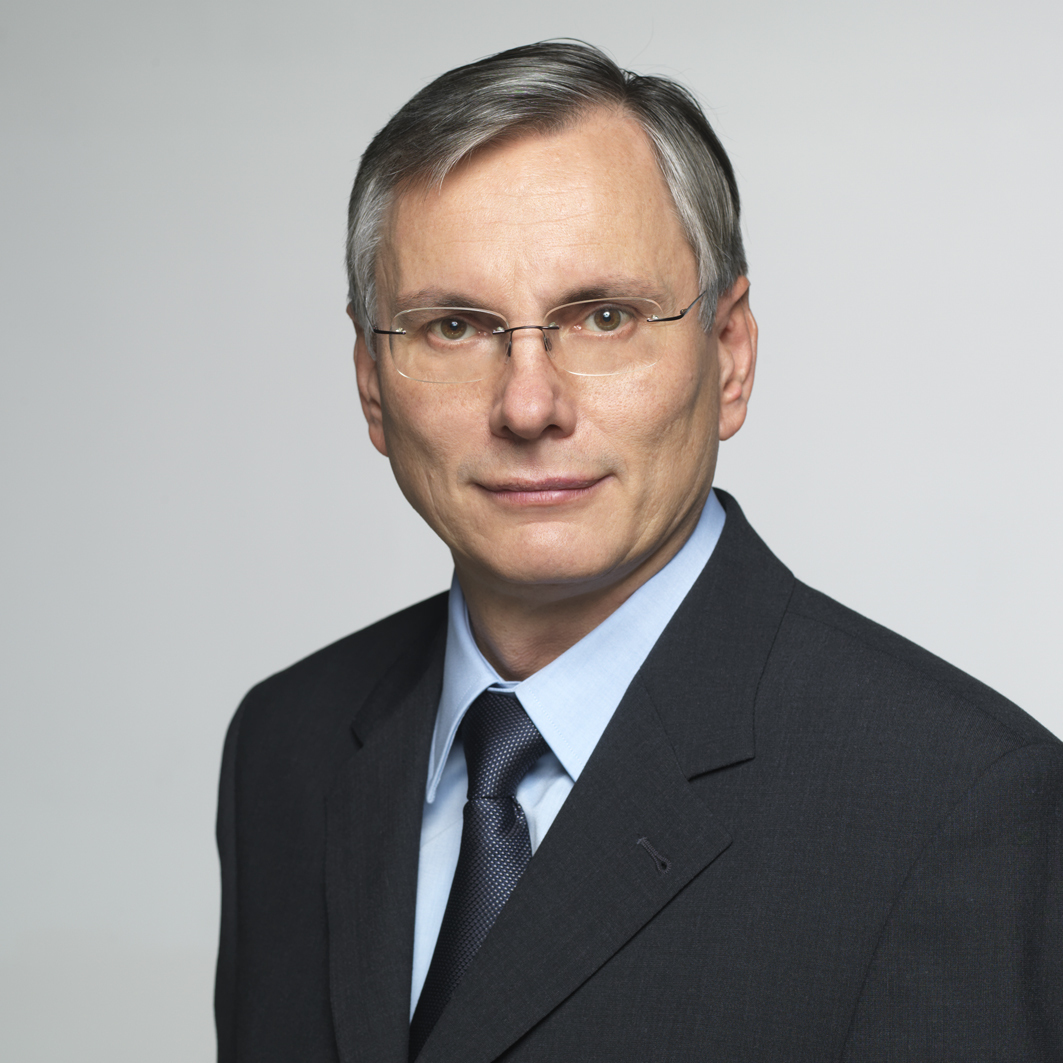

Member of the National Council
- Incumbent
- Assumed office 18 December 2017
- Parliamentary leader: Christian Kern & Andreas Schieder
- Parliamentary group: Social Democratic Party

Minister of Labour, Social Affairs and Consumer Protection
- In office 26 January 2016 – 18 December 2017
- Chancellor: Christian Kern; Werner Faymann
- Preceded by: Rudolf Hundstorfer
- Succeeded by: Beate Hartinger-Klein

Minister of Transport, Innovation and Technology
- In office 2 September 2014 – 26 January 2016
- Chancellor: Werner Faymann
- Preceded by: Doris Bures
- Succeeded by: Gerald Klug

Minister of Health
- In office 2 December 2008 – 2 September 2014
- Chancellor: Werner Faymann
- Preceded by: Andrea Kdolsky
- Succeeded by: Sabine Oberhauser

Personal details
- Born: 3 September 1960 (age 66) Linz, Austria
- Party: Social Democratic Party
- Education: Social academy of the Austrian Chamber of Labour(1986-1987); European Trade Union Academy; Marc Bloch University in Strasbourg and Linz

Alois Stöger (born 3 September 1960) is an Austrian politician who served as minister of transport, innovation, and technology from 2014 to 2016 and minister of labour, social affairs, and consumer protection from 2016 to 2017. A member of the Social Democratic Party of Austria (SPÖ), he served as minister of health from 2008 to 2014.

== Life and career ==
Born in Linz, Stöger attended elementary school in Allerheiligen between 1966 and 1971 and secondary modern school/junior high school in Perg from 1971 to 1975. Afterwards he took an apprenticeship as a machine fitter until 1979. From 1979 to 1986 he was a skilled worker in the Voest Alpine AG. He became secretary of the union Metals-Mining-Energy (Metall-Bergbau-Energie) in the Gmunden district in 1986. He attended the social academy of the Austrian Chamber of Labour between 1986 and 1987 and completed training as a supervisor in 1982. Stöger also trained at the European Trade Union Academy and studied social practice at the Marc Bloch University in Strasbourg and Linz. In 2000 he finished his studies with the Diplôme des Hautes Etudes des Pratiques Sociales.

Since 1997, Stöger has been a member of the local council of Gallneukirchen, serving as an alderman between 2003 and 2008. He was councillor in the Chamber of Labour in Upper Austria from 2000 to 2008 and served as Minister of Health, Family Affairs and Youth from 2 December 2008 to 31 January 2009. From February 2009 to September 2014 he served as Minister of Health, and since September 2014 he serves as Minister of Transport, Innovation and Technology.
