= Sophie Karmasin =

Austrian politician (born 1967)

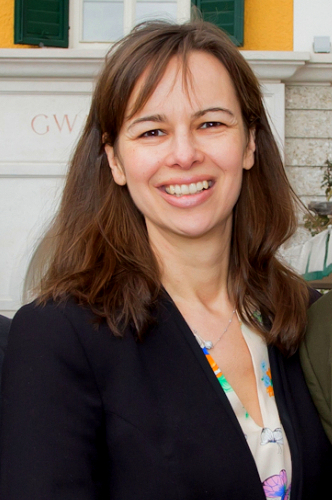
Karmasin in 2013

Sophie Karmasin (born 5 January 1967) is an opinion researcher who was Minister for Families and Youth of Austria for four years.

Karmasin was born in Vienna. Her parents were Helene and Fritz Karmasin, the latter was a son of Franz Karmasin; Matthias Karmasin is her brother. She studied business administration and later psychology at the University of Salzburg. She led the family-owned Karasim Motivforschung, a market research company founded by her parents, until entering politics. Karmasin is married with two children.

She was appointed to the second Faymann government in December 2013. She was nominated for the office by the Austrian People's Party (ÖVP), but does not have a party membership. She worked on increasing family benefits and improving day care capacity but was criticised for her lack of experience in politics.

Karmasin left politics after the 2017 Austrian legislative election. In 2018 she founded a consulting firm. Since 2019 she presents an opinion poll segment on television channel Puls 24.

In 2021, Karmasin was one of ten people accused of bribery and embezzlement in the Kurz corruption probe. Investigators allege that she acted as an intermediary between the ÖVP and the founders of Österreich, a newspaper that published manipulated opinion polls. Sabine Beinschab, a former assistant of Karmasin, was arrested on 12 October. Karmasin herself was arrested on 3 March due to critical risk of committing a crime and collusion.
