= Wolfgang Brandstetter =

Austrian politician and scholar (born 1957)

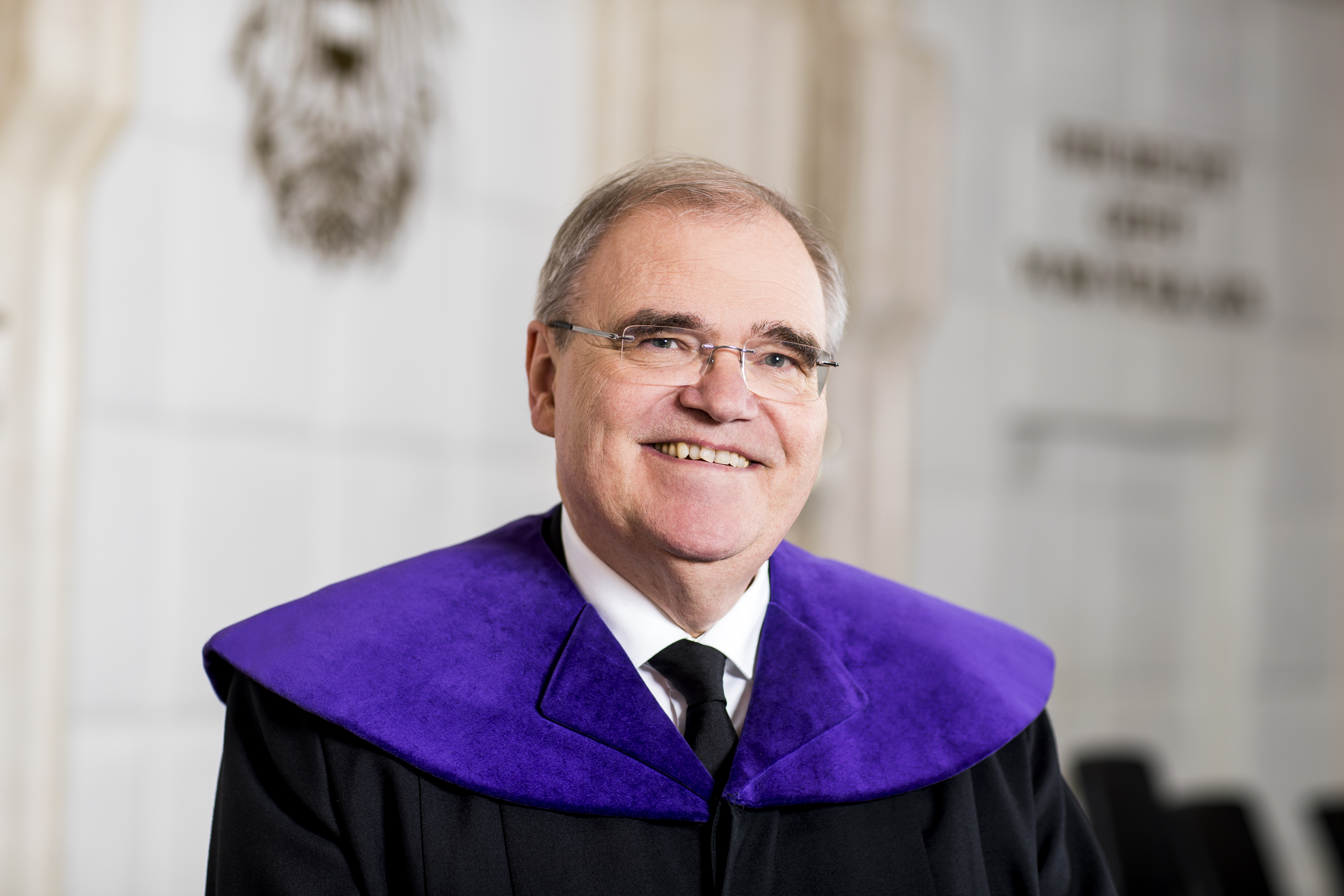

Member of the Constitutional Court
- In office 27 February 2018 – 7 June 2021
- Appointed by: Federal Government

Vice-Chancellor of Austria
- In office 17 May 2017 – 18 December 2017
- Chancellor: Christian Kern
- Preceded by: Reinhold Mitterlehner
- Succeeded by: Heinz-Christian Strache

Minister of Justice
- In office 16 December 2013 – 18 December 2017
- Chancellor: Werner Faymann; Christian Kern
- Preceded by: Beatrix Karl
- Succeeded by: Josef Moser

Personal details
- Born: 7 October 1957 (age 68) Haag, Austria
- Party: Independent
- Children: 3
- Education: University of Vienna

Wolfgang Brandstetter is an independent Austrian politician and legal scholar who served as a member of the Constitutional Court of Austria from 2018 to 2021. He previously served as the Minister of Justice of Austria, as well as the country's Vice Chancellor.

== Early life ==
Brandstetter was born on 7 October 1957 in Haag. His father was forbidden from studying law by the Nazis in Haag due to his church involvement. Brandstetter grew up in Eggenburg, and later attended the Bundesgymnasium Horn, where he took his matura. After graduating, he studied law, English, and Russian at the University of Vienna. In 1980, he defended and received his doctorate, and afterwards he worked as an assistant at the Institute of Criminal Law and Criminology at his alma mater. He received his habilitation from the Faculty of Law at the University of Vienna in 1991. In 1997, he moved to teaching at the University of Linz after an offer, but later the next year, in 1998, he returned to the University of Vienna to succeed Winfried Platzgummer as a full professor of criminal law.

== Career ==
In 2007 Brandstetter became director of the Institute for Austrian and European Economic Criminal Law at the Vienna University of Economics and Business. He continued to practice law, appearing as the criminal defence lawyer for the technical director in the Kaprun disaster during the proceedings in 2004, for Chancellor Werner Faymann in investigations during an advertising case, Kazakh ex-ambassador Rakhat Aliyev, and Rudolf Fischer in the Telekom Austria Affair.

Brandstetter was chosen to be a member of the Werner Faymann cabinet in December 2013, designated to serve as the country's Minister of Justice. In 2016, he formally acknowledged that the Austrian judiciary was a tool of the Nazi regime, and that it had violated fundamental legal protections. He announced that it would become mandatory for future judges and prosecutors to receive historical education about the judiciary during the Nazi era, and would have to visit memorial sites for the Holocaust. He also announced that he would support investigations into the careers of Austrian legal officials during the Nazi period as part of denazification. He later succeeded Reinhold Mitterlehner in becoming the Vice-Chancellor of Austria in May 2017.

Brandtstetter left office upon the swearing-in of Heinz-Christian Strache to his position on 18 December 2017. In 2018, he served as a special adviser to European Commissioner for Justice, Consumers and Gender Equality Věra Jourová on rule-of-law issues.

=== Member of the Constitutional Court (2018–2021) ===
In February 2018 Brandstetter was appointed as a member of the Constitutional Court of Austria.

When prosecutors opened a probe in 2021 into whether Chancellor Sebastian Kurz had lied to a parliamentary committee investigating allegations of corruption by members of his previous government, Brandstetter also became a subject of criminal investigations.

In June 2021, Brandstetter resigned following the publication of a series of private text messages sent to him by former colleague Christian Pilnacek (suspended section head in the Austrian Ministry of Justice) containing sexist and racist language.

== Personal life ==
Brandstetter is married and has three children.

== Honours ==
- Knight Grand Cross of the Order of Merit of the Principality of Liechtenstein (11 February 2019).

Political offices
| Preceded by Beatrix Karl | Minister of Justice; 2013–2017 | Succeeded by Josef Moser |
| Preceded by Reinhold Mitterlehner | Vice-Chancellor of Austria; 2017 | Succeeded by Heinz-Christian Strache |
