= Andrea Kdolsky =

Austrian physician and politician (1962–2026)

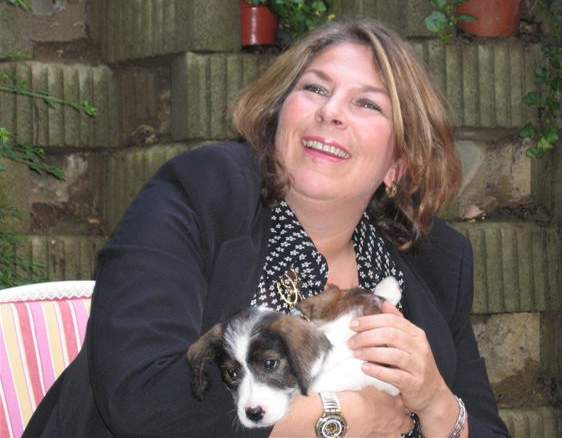
Andrea Kdolsky in 2007

Andrea Kdolsky (née Pelucha; 2 November 1962 – 30 September 2026) was an Austrian physician and politician (Non-party, until 2023 ÖVP) who was Minister for Health, Family and Youth in the Alfred Gusenbauer government.

== Life and career ==
Kdolsky was born and grew up in Vienna. She originally began studying law and economics, but ultimately completed a Doctor of Medicine in 1993 at the University of Vienna. She subsequently worked as an anaesthesiologist.

From 11 January 2007 to 2 December 2008 Kdolsky was Minister for Health, Family and Youth in the cabinet of Alfred Gusenbauer. She was ÖVP Minister.

After retirement from politics she became a consultant on health care.

Kdolsky was at one time a member of the Austrian People's Party. In March 2023 she left the party after a state government was formed from the ÖVP and the FPÖ in Lower Austria after the state elections in January 2023. She rejected the FPÖ under state party leader Udo Landbauer.

Kdolsky died from cancer in Vienna on 30 September 2026, at the age of 63.

== Publications ==
- Mörwald, Toni (2007). Kdolsky, Andrea (ed.). Schweinsbraten & Co: die besten Rezepte vom Schwein (cookbook) (in German). Holzhausen-Verlag. ISBN 978-3-85493-151-5.
- Kdolsky, Andrea (2012). Hauptsache gesund: die unheilbaren Krankheiten des österreichischen Gesundheitswesens (in German). Goldegg Verlag. ISBN 978-3-902729-71-2.
