= Wolfgang Peschorn =

Austrian Independent politician

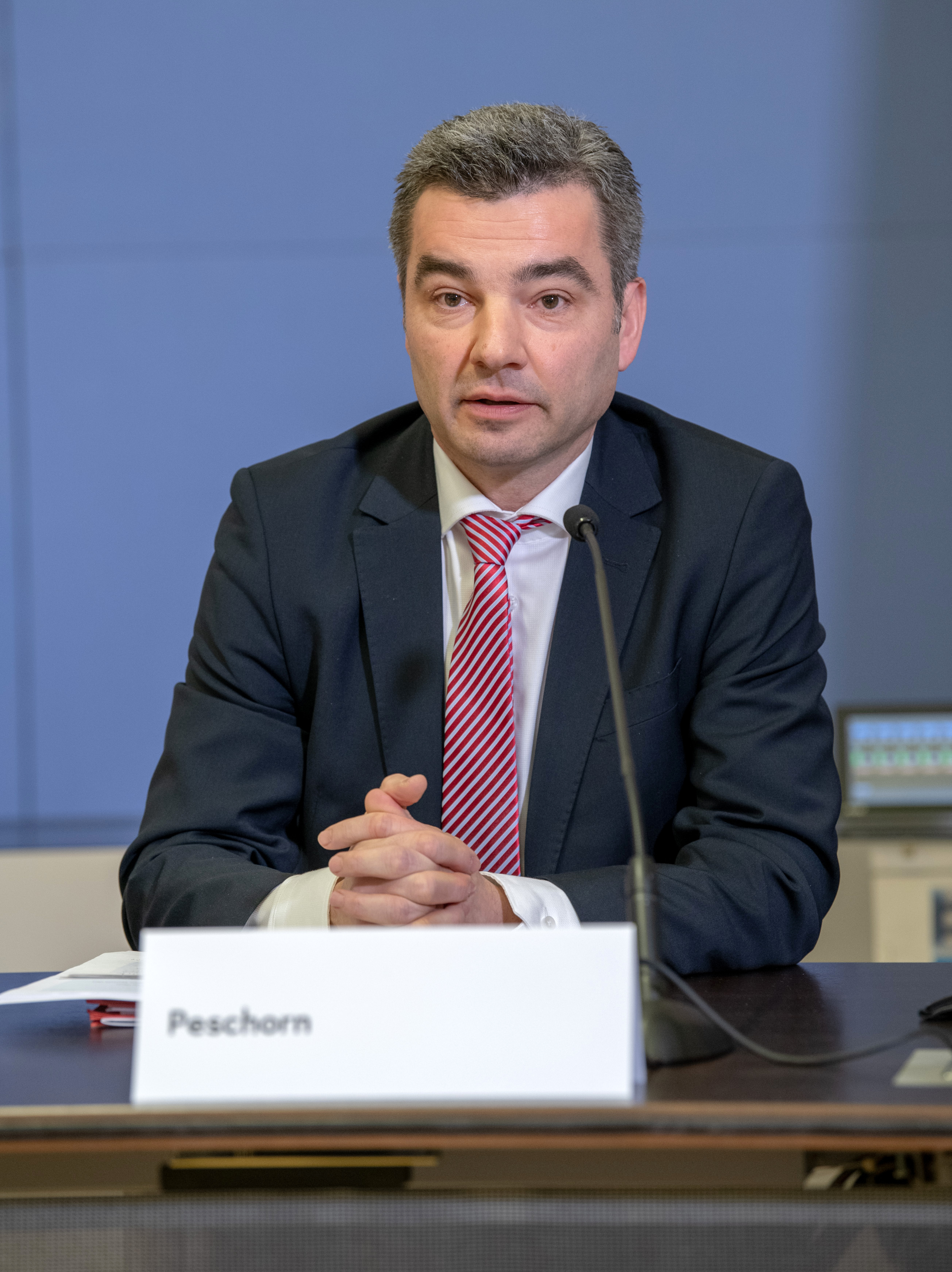
- Peschorn in March 2019

Minister of the Interior
- In office 3 June 2019 – 7 January 2020
- Chancellor: Brigitte Bierlein
- Preceded by: Eckart Ratz
- Succeeded by: Karl Nehammer

Personal details
- Born: 17 May 1965 (age 60) Vienna, Austria
- Party: Independent

Wolfgang Peschorn (born 17 May 1965) is an Austrian Independent politician who served as Minister of the Interior from 2019 to 2020 under Chancellor Brigitte Bierlein.
