= Josef Riegler =

Austrian politician and teacher (born 1938)

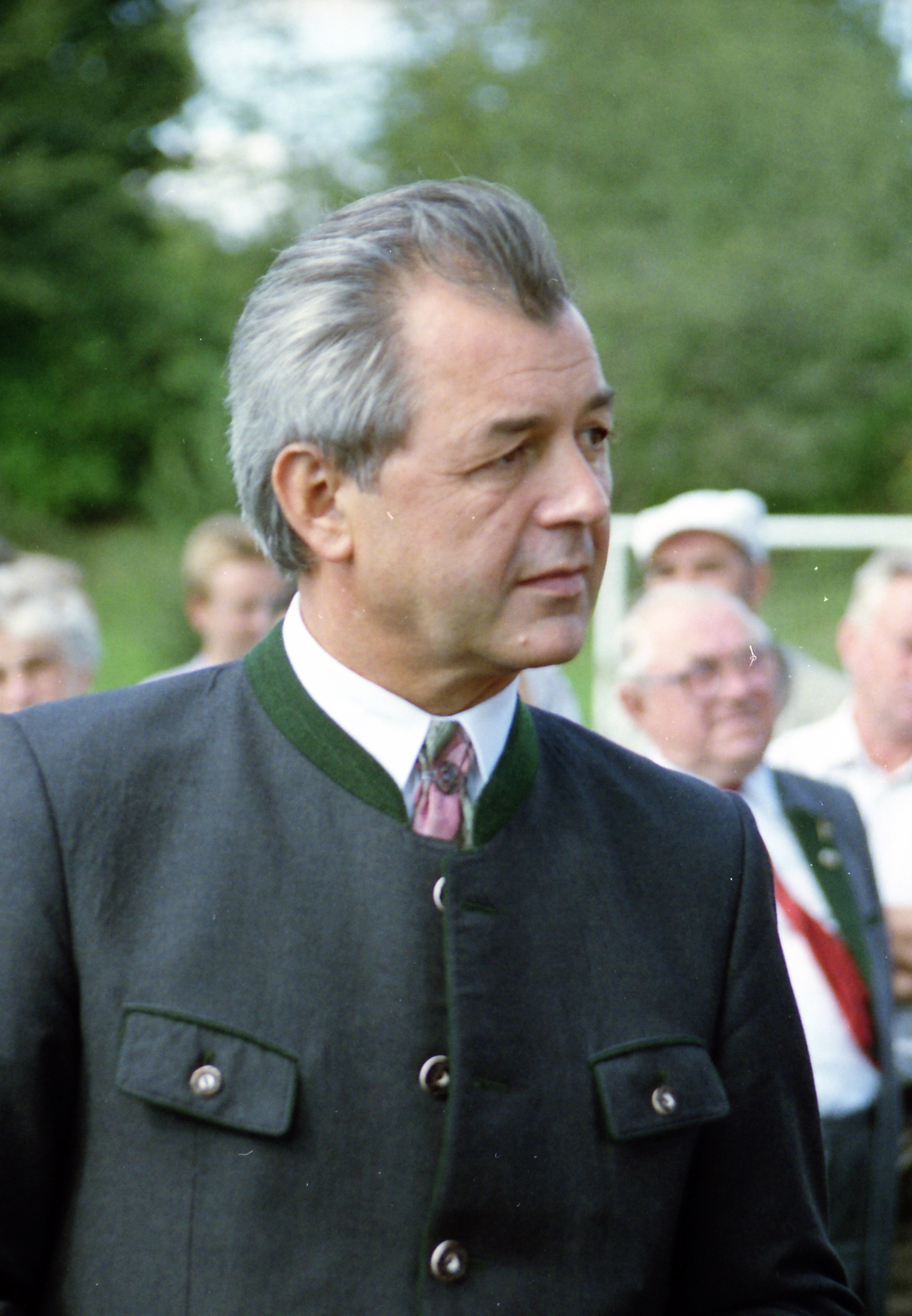
- Riegler in September 1990

Vice-Chancellor of Austria
- In office 24 April 1989 – 2 July 1991
- Chancellor: Franz Vranitzky
- Preceded by: Alois Mock
- Succeeded by: Erhard Busek

Chair of the People's Party
- In office 24 April 1989 – 2 July 1991
- Preceded by: Alois Mock
- Succeeded by: Erhard Busek
Ministerial offices
Federal Minister for Federalism and Administrative Reform
In office 24 April 1989 – 22 October 1991
Chancellor	Franz Vranitzky
Preceded by	Heinrich Neisser
Succeeded by	Jürgen Weiss
Federal Minister for Agriculture and Forestry
In office 21 January 1987 – 24 April 1989
Chancellor	Franz Vranitzky
Preceded by	Erich Schmidt
Succeeded by	Franz Fischler

Personal details
- Born: 3 November 1938 (age 87) Judenburg, Austria
- Party: People's
- Spouse: Antonia Schaffer (m. 1966)
- Children: 2
- Parent(s): Franz Rigler (father); Maria Rigler (mother)
- Education: University of Natural Resources and Life Sciences Vienna
- Occupation: Politician; teacher

Josef Riegler (born 1 November 1938) is an Austrian former politician and teacher who served as Vice-Chancellor of Austria and Chair of the People's Party from 1989 to 1991.

== Early life and education ==
Josef Rigler was born on 1 November 1938 to Franz and Maria Riegler in Judenburg. His father died during the Second World War in Italy in 1944. He grew up on a small mountain farm near Judenburg. He obtained his Matura in 1960 and graduated from the University of Natural Resources and Life Sciences in 1965.

== Career ==
From 1965 to 1971, Riegler was a teacher at agricultural colleges, and from 1971 to 1972 he was the director of the agricultural colleges in Stainz. He was Director of the Styrian Farmers' Association from 1972 to 1980 and then Director of the Austrian Farmers' Association from 1980 to 1983.

Riegler served as Vice-Chancellor of Austria and Chair of the People's Party from 1989 to 1991. He also served as Federal Minister for Agriculture and Forestry from 1987 to 1990 and Federal Minister for Federalism and Administrative Reform from 1989 to 1991.

== Personal life ==
Riegler married Antonia Schaffer in 1966 and they have two children together: Martina (born 1967) and Klemens (born 1970). They have four grandchildren. Rieger is Roman Catholic.
