= Chair of the Austrian People's Party =

List of chairmen of the Austrian People's Party

Chairman of the People's Party
- Bundesparteivorsitzender der Volkspartei
- Logo of the People's Party

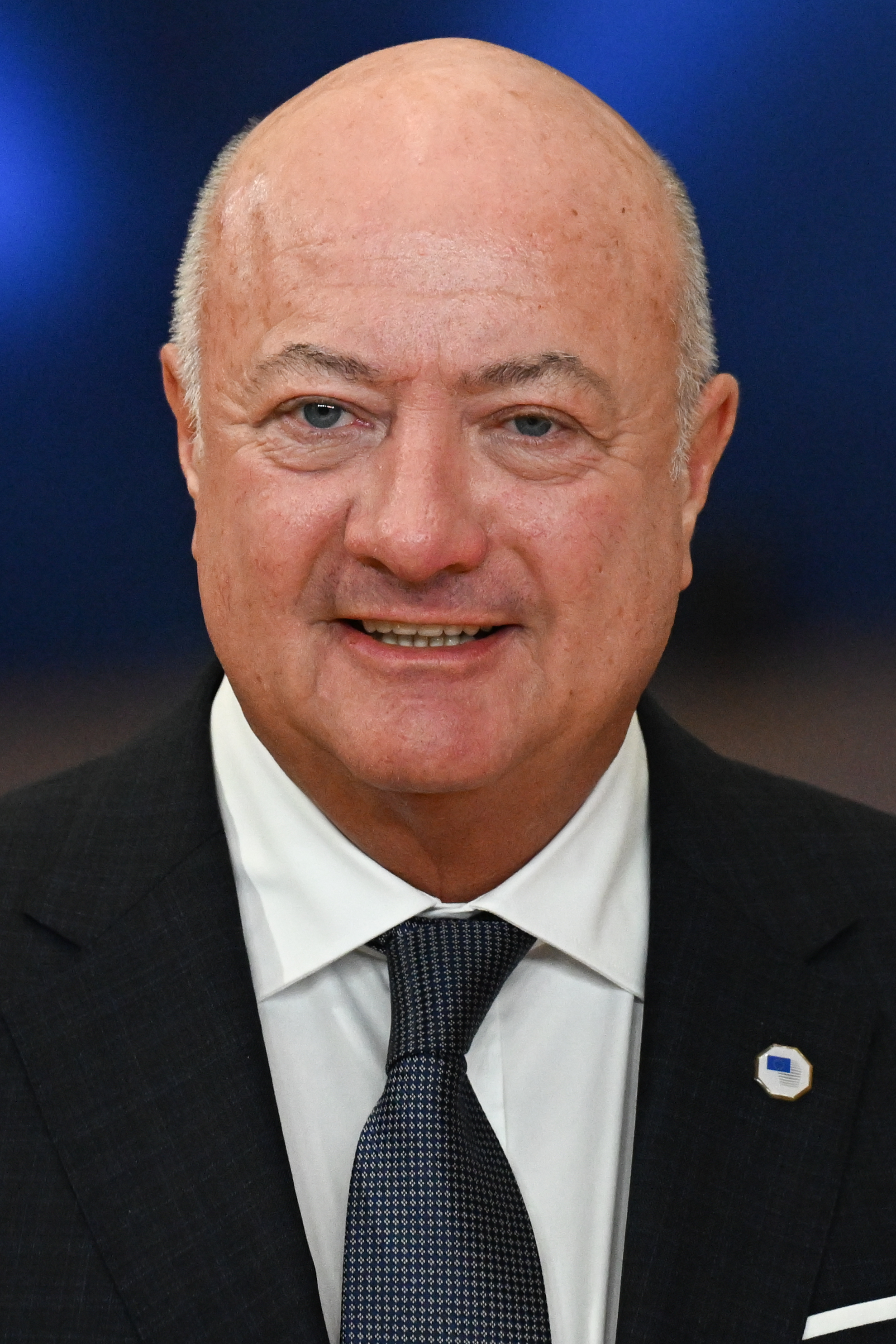
- Incumbent; Christian Stocker since 29 March 2025
- Status: Party leader
- Appointer: Bundesparteitag
- Term length: No term limit
- Constituting instrument: Party statutes
- Website: www.oevp.at

The chair of the Austrian People's Party (German: Bundesparteivorsitzender der Volkspartei) is the highest position within Austria's People's Party. The current holder of the position is Christian Stocker, who held the position since 29 March 2025, he held the same position as Acting leader from 5 January 2025 to 29 March 2025.

== List of officeholders ==
Portrait	Name	Took office	Left office	Chancellor	Ref.
	Leopold Figl	17 April 1945	2 April 1953	Himself (ÖVP)	
	Julius Raab	2 April 1953	11 April 1961	Himself (ÖVP)	
	Alfons Gorbach	11 April 1961	2 April 1964	Himself (ÖVP)	
	Josef Klaus	2 April 1964	21 April 1970	Himself (ÖVP)	
	Hermann Withalm	21 April 1970	5 June 1971	Bruno Kreisky (SPÖ)	
	Karl Schleinzer	5 June 1971	19 July 1975	Bruno Kreisky (SPÖ)	
	Josef Taus	19 July 1975	7 July 1979	Bruno Kreisky (SPÖ)	
	Alois Mock	7 July 1979	24 April 1989	Bruno Kreisky (SPÖ); Fred Sinowatz (SPÖ); Franz Vranitzky (SPÖ)	
	Josef Riegler	24 April 1989	2 July 1991	Franz Vranitzky (SPÖ)	
	Erhard Busek	2 July 1991	22 April 1995	Franz Vranitzky (SPÖ)	
	Wolfgang Schüssel	22 April 1995	21 April 2007	Franz Vranitzky (SPÖ); Viktor Klima (SPÖ); Himself (ÖVP); Alfred Gusenbauer (SPÖ)	
	Wilhelm Molterer	21 April 2007	28 November 2008	Alfred Gusenbauer (SPÖ)	
	Josef Pröll	28 November 2008	20 May 2011	Alfred Gusenbauer (SPÖ); Werner Faymann (SPÖ)	
	Michael Spindelegger	20 May 2011	26 August 2014	Werner Faymann (SPÖ)	
	Reinhold Mitterlehner	8 November 2014	15 May 2017	Werner Faymann (SPÖ); Himself (ÖVP); Christian Kern (SPÖ)	
	Sebastian Kurz	15 May 2017	3 December 2021	Christian Kern (SPÖ); Himself (ÖVP); Brigitte Bierlein (Independent Bierlein Government); Himself (ÖVP); Alexander Schallenberg (ÖVP)	
	Karl Nehammer	3 December 2021	5 January 2025	Himself (ÖVP)	
	Christian Stocker	5 January 2025	Incumbent	Karl Nehammer (ÖVP) Alexander Schallenberg (ÖVP) Himself (ÖVP)	
