= Franz Stocker =

Austrian politician (1933–2026)

Member of the National Council of Austria
- In office 19 May 1983 – 16 December 1993

Member of the Federal Council of Austria
- In office 5 June 1979 – 18 May 1983

Personal details
- Born: 1 May 1933 Raiding, Burgenland, Austria
- Died: 17 April 2026 (aged 92)
- Party: ÖVP
- Children: Christian Stocker
- Occupation: Electrician

Franz Stocker (1 May 1933 – 17 April 2026) was an Austrian politician. A member of the Austrian People's Party, he served in the Federal Council from 1979 to 1983 and in the National Council from 1983 to 1993.

Stocker died on 17 April 2026, at the age of 92. He was the father of Austrian chancellor Christian Stocker.
