= Lower Austria South (National Council electoral district) =

Parliamentary electoral district in Austria

- Niederösterreich Süd
- Electoral District for the National Council
- Location of Lower Austria South within Austria
- District: List: Neunkirchen; Wiener Neustadt City; Wiener Neustadt
- State: Lower Austria
- Population: 216,852 (2024)
- Electorate: 159,888 (2019)
- Area: 2,178 km^{2} (2023)

Current Electoral District
- Created: 1994
- Seats: List: 4 (2024–present); 5 (2013–2024); 4 (1994–2013)
- Members: Christian Stocker (ÖVP)

Lower Austria South (German: Niederösterreich Süd), also known as Electoral District 3E (German: Wahlkreis 3E), is one of the 39 multi-member regional electoral districts of the National Council, the lower house of the Austrian Parliament, the national legislature of Austria. The electoral district was created in 1992 when electoral regulations were amended to add regional electoral districts to the existing state-wide electoral districts and came into being at the following legislative election in 1994. It consists of the city of Wiener Neustadt and the districts of Neunkirchen and Wiener Neustadt in the state of Lower Austria. The electoral district currently elects four of the 183 members of the National Council using the open party-list proportional representation electoral system. At the 2019 legislative election the constituency had 159,888 registered electors.

== History ==
Lower Austria South was one 43 regional electoral districts (regionalwahlkreise) established by the "National Council Electoral Regulations 1992" (Nationalrats-Wahlordnung 1992) passed by the National Council in 1992. It consisted of the city of Wiener Neustadt and the districts of Neunkirchen and Wiener Neustadt in the state of Lower Austria. The district was initially allocated four seats in May 1993. Electoral regulations require the allocation of seats amongst the electoral districts to be recalculated following each national census and in June 2013 the number of seats allocated to Lower Austria South was increased to five based on the population as at the 2011 national census. The number of seats allocated to Lower Austria South was reduced to four in June 2023 based on the population as at the 2021 national census.

== Electoral system ==
Lower Austria South currently elects four of the 183 members of the National Council using the open party-list proportional representation electoral system. The allocation of seats is carried out in three stages. In the first stage, seats are allocated to parties (lists) at the regional level using a state-wide Hare quota (wahlzahl) (valid votes in the state divided by the number of seats in the state). In the second stage, seats are allocated to parties at the state/provincial level using the state-wide Hare quota (any seats won by the party at the regional stage are subtracted from the party's state seats). In the third and final stage, seats are allocated to parties at the federal/national level using the D'Hondt method (any seats won by the party at the regional and state stages are subtracted from the party's federal seats). Only parties that reach the 4% national threshold, or have won a seat at the regional stage, compete for seats at the state and federal stages.

Electors may cast one preferential vote for individual candidates at the regional, state and federal levels. Split-ticket voting (panachage), or voting for more than one candidate at each level, is not permitted and will result in the ballot paper being invalidated. At the regional level, candidates must receive preferential votes amounting to at least 14% of the valid votes cast for their party to over-ride the order of the party list (10% and 7% respectively for the state and federal levels). Prior to April 2013 electors could not cast preferential votes at the federal level and the thresholds candidates needed to over-ride the party list order were higher at the regional level (half the Hare quota or 1/6 of the party votes) and state level (Hare quota).

== Election results ==
=== Summary ===
| Election | Communists KPÖ+ / KPÖ | | | Social Democrats SPÖ | | | Greens GRÜNE | | | NEOS NEOS / LiF | | | People's ÖVP | | | Freedom FPÖ | | |
| Election | Votes | % | Seats | Votes | % | Seats | Votes | % | Seats | Votes | % | Seats | Votes | % | Seats | Votes | % | Seats |
|---|---|---|---|---|---|---|---|---|---|---|---|---|---|---|---|---|---|---|
| 2019 | 726 | 0.59% | 0 | 27,673 | 22.51% | 0 | 11,110 | 9.04% | 0 | 7,967 | 6.48% | 0 | 48,568 | 39.50% | 1 | 24,190 | 19.67% | 0 |
| 2017 | 693 | 0.53% | 0 | 34,977 | 26.80% | 1 | 2,804 | 2.15% | 0 | 5,209 | 3.99% | 0 | 41,957 | 32.14% | 1 | 37,961 | 29.08% | 1 |
| 2013 | 922 | 0.75% | 0 | 38,705 | 31.59% | 1 | 9,908 | 8.09% | 0 | 4,382 | 3.58% | 0 | 31,450 | 25.67% | 1 | 26,577 | 21.69% | 0 |
| 2008 | 820 | 0.65% | 0 | 44,788 | 35.24% | 1 | 8,077 | 6.36% | 0 | 1,921 | 1.51% | 0 | 33,050 | 26.01% | 1 | 26,573 | 20.91% | 0 |
| 2006 | 994 | 0.80% | 0 | 52,574 | 42.38% | 1 | 9,202 | 7.42% | 0 | | | | 40,708 | 32.81% | 1 | 13,688 | 11.03% | 0 |
| 2002 | 616 | 0.49% | 0 | 55,787 | 43.97% | 1 | 8,148 | 6.42% | 0 | 947 | 0.75% | 0 | 52,411 | 41.31% | 1 | 8,952 | 7.06% | 0 |
| 1999 | 590 | 0.49% | 0 | 48,880 | 40.38% | 1 | 6,242 | 5.16% | 0 | 2,885 | 2.38% | 0 | 31,955 | 26.40% | 1 | 28,676 | 23.69% | 1 |
| 1995 | 502 | 0.41% | 0 | 55,817 | 45.38% | 2 | 3,774 | 3.07% | 0 | 5,934 | 4.82% | 0 | 33,944 | 27.60% | 1 | 21,497 | 17.48% | 0 |
| 1994 | 475 | 0.40% | 0 | 50,876 | 42.80% | 1 | 5,622 | 4.73% | 0 | 6,304 | 5.30% | 0 | 32,197 | 27.08% | 1 | 21,963 | 18.48% | 0 |

=== Detailed ===
==== 2010s ====
===== 2019 =====
Results of the 2019 legislative election held on 29 September 2019:

| Party | | Votes per district | | | | Total votes | % | Seats |
| Party | | Neun- kirchen | Wiener Neu- stadt City | Wiener Neu- stadt | Voting card | Total votes | % | Seats |
|---|---|---|---|---|---|---|---|---|
| Austrian People's Party | ÖVP | 21,468 | 7,016 | 19,944 | 140 | 48,568 | 39.50% | 1 |
| Social Democratic Party of Austria | SPÖ | 12,170 | 5,537 | 9,905 | 61 | 27,673 | 22.51% | 0 |
| Freedom Party of Austria | FPÖ | 10,113 | 4,523 | 9,482 | 72 | 24,190 | 19.67% | 0 |
| The Greens | GRÜNE | 4,468 | 2,616 | 3,914 | 112 | 11,110 | 9.04% | 0 |
| NEOS – The New Austria and Liberal Forum | NEOS | 3,106 | 1,653 | 3,158 | 50 | 7,967 | 6.48% | 0 |
| JETZT | JETZT | 896 | 482 | 726 | 16 | 2,120 | 1.72% | 0 |
| KPÖ Plus | KPÖ+ | 306 | 176 | 242 | 2 | 726 | 0.59% | 0 |
| Der Wandel | WANDL | 241 | 119 | 235 | 4 | 599 | 0.49% | 0 |
| Valid Votes | | 52,768 | 22,122 | 47,606 | 457 | 122,953 | 100.00% | 1 |
| Rejected Votes | | 886 | 254 | 725 | 5 | 1,870 | 1.50% | |
| Total Polled | | 53,654 | 22,376 | 48,331 | 462 | 124,823 | 78.07% | |
| Registered Electors | | 67,903 | 31,417 | 60,568 | | 159,888 | | |
| Turnout | | 79.02% | 71.22% | 79.80% | | 78.07% | | |

The following candidates were elected:

- Party mandates - Christian Stocker (ÖVP), 4,068 votes.

===== 2017 =====
Results of the 2017 legislative election held on 15 October 2017:

| Party | | Votes per district | | | | Total votes | % | Seats |
| Party | | Neun- kirchen | Wiener Neu- stadt City | Wiener Neu- stadt | Voting card | Total votes | % | Seats |
|---|---|---|---|---|---|---|---|---|
| Austrian People's Party | ÖVP | 18,421 | 6,390 | 17,003 | 143 | 41,957 | 32.14% | 1 |
| Freedom Party of Austria | FPÖ | 16,027 | 6,754 | 15,061 | 119 | 37,961 | 29.08% | 1 |
| Social Democratic Party of Austria | SPÖ | 15,303 | 7,133 | 12,404 | 137 | 34,977 | 26.80% | 1 |
| NEOS – The New Austria and Liberal Forum | NEOS | 2,038 | 1,067 | 2,059 | 45 | 5,209 | 3.99% | 0 |
| Peter Pilz List | PILZ | 1,928 | 1,127 | 1,827 | 48 | 4,930 | 3.78% | 0 |
| The Greens | GRÜNE | 1,185 | 684 | 905 | 30 | 2,804 | 2.15% | 0 |
| My Vote Counts! | GILT | 671 | 304 | 608 | 5 | 1,588 | 1.22% | 0 |
| Communist Party of Austria | KPÖ | 249 | 178 | 256 | 10 | 693 | 0.53% | 0 |
| The Whites | WEIßE | 121 | 52 | 95 | 3 | 271 | 0.21% | 0 |
| Free List Austria | FLÖ | 61 | 23 | 55 | 1 | 140 | 0.11% | 0 |
| Valid Votes | | 56,004 | 23,712 | 50,273 | 541 | 130,530 | 100.00% | 3 |
| Rejected Votes | | 676 | 231 | 628 | 0 | 1,535 | 1.16% | |
| Total Polled | | 56,680 | 23,943 | 50,901 | 541 | 132,065 | 82.82% | |
| Registered Electors | | 67,967 | 31,306 | 60,187 | | 159,460 | | |
| Turnout | | 83.39% | 76.48% | 84.57% | | 82.82% | | |

The following candidates were elected:

- Party mandates - Johann Rädler (ÖVP), 4,529 votes; Peter Schmiedlechner (FPÖ), 2,594 votes; and Peter Wittmann (SPÖ), 3,159 votes.

Substitutions:

- Johann Rädler (ÖVP) resigned on 11 June 2019 and was replaced by Christian Stocker (ÖVP) on 12 June 2019.

===== 2013 =====
Results of the 2013 legislative election held on 29 September 2013:

| Party | | Votes per district | | | | Total votes | % | Seats |
| Party | | Neun- kirchen | Wiener Neu- stadt City | Wiener Neu- stadt | Voting card | Total votes | % | Seats |
|---|---|---|---|---|---|---|---|---|
| Social Democratic Party of Austria | SPÖ | 17,782 | 7,158 | 13,688 | 77 | 38,705 | 31.59% | 1 |
| Austrian People's Party | ÖVP | 14,364 | 3,777 | 13,237 | 72 | 31,450 | 25.67% | 1 |
| Freedom Party of Austria | FPÖ | 11,064 | 5,091 | 10,356 | 66 | 26,577 | 21.69% | 0 |
| The Greens | GRÜNE | 3,953 | 2,362 | 3,538 | 55 | 9,908 | 8.09% | 0 |
| Team Stronach | FRANK | 2,580 | 1,184 | 2,513 | 25 | 6,302 | 5.14% | 0 |
| NEOS – The New Austria | NEOS | 1,734 | 987 | 1,627 | 34 | 4,382 | 3.58% | 0 |
| Alliance for the Future of Austria | BZÖ | 1,424 | 643 | 1,338 | 22 | 3,427 | 2.80% | 0 |
| Communist Party of Austria | KPÖ | 354 | 246 | 316 | 6 | 922 | 0.75% | 0 |
| Pirate Party of Austria | PIRAT | 343 | 216 | 294 | 5 | 858 | 0.70% | 0 |
| Valid Votes | | 53,598 | 21,664 | 46,907 | 362 | 122,531 | 100.00% | 2 |
| Rejected Votes | | 1,096 | 343 | 1,033 | 3 | 2,475 | 1.98% | |
| Total Polled | | 54,694 | 22,007 | 47,940 | 365 | 125,006 | 78.74% | |
| Registered Electors | | 68,505 | 30,920 | 59,323 | | 158,748 | | |
| Turnout | | 79.84% | 71.17% | 80.81% | | 78.74% | | |

The following candidates were elected:

- Personal mandates - Johann Rädler (ÖVP), 4,639 votes.
- Party mandates - Peter Wittmann (SPÖ), 4,047 votes.

==== 2000s ====
===== 2008 =====
Results of the 2008 legislative election held on 28 September 2008:

| Party | | Votes per district | | | | Total votes | % | Seats |
| Party | | Neun- kirchen | Wiener Neu- stadt City | Wiener Neu- stadt | Voting card | Total votes | % | Seats |
|---|---|---|---|---|---|---|---|---|
| Social Democratic Party of Austria | SPÖ | 20,300 | 8,598 | 15,604 | 286 | 44,788 | 35.24% | 1 |
| Austrian People's Party | ÖVP | 14,913 | 4,123 | 13,807 | 207 | 33,050 | 26.01% | 1 |
| Freedom Party of Austria | FPÖ | 11,418 | 4,963 | 10,015 | 177 | 26,573 | 20.91% | 0 |
| Alliance for the Future of Austria | BZÖ | 3,701 | 1,578 | 3,326 | 64 | 8,669 | 6.82% | 0 |
| The Greens | GRÜNE | 3,294 | 1,893 | 2,750 | 140 | 8,077 | 6.36% | 0 |
| Liberal Forum | LiF | 636 | 560 | 688 | 37 | 1,921 | 1.51% | 0 |
| Fritz Dinkhauser List – Citizens' Forum Tyrol | FRITZ | 584 | 226 | 571 | 11 | 1,392 | 1.10% | 0 |
| Independent Citizens' Initiative Save Austria | RETTÖ | 479 | 172 | 410 | 11 | 1,072 | 0.84% | 0 |
| Communist Party of Austria | KPÖ | 318 | 215 | 275 | 12 | 820 | 0.65% | 0 |
| The Christians | DC | 377 | 110 | 224 | 12 | 723 | 0.57% | 0 |
| Valid Votes | | 56,020 | 22,438 | 47,670 | 957 | 127,085 | 100.00% | 2 |
| Rejected Votes | | 1,349 | 451 | 1,360 | 14 | 3,174 | 2.44% | |
| Total Polled | | 57,369 | 22,889 | 49,030 | 971 | 130,259 | 83.06% | |
| Registered Electors | | 68,619 | 30,245 | 57,966 | | 156,830 | | |
| Turnout | | 83.61% | 75.68% | 84.58% | | 83.06% | | |

The following candidates were elected:

- Party mandates - Johann Rädler (ÖVP), 5,172 votes; and Peter Wittmann (SPÖ), 4,919 votes.

===== 2006 =====
Results of the 2006 legislative election held on 1 October 2006:

| Party | | Votes per district | | | | Total votes | % | Seats |
| Party | | Neun- kirchen | Wiener Neu- stadt City | Wiener Neu- stadt | Voting card | Total votes | % | Seats |
|---|---|---|---|---|---|---|---|---|
| Social Democratic Party of Austria | SPÖ | 22,875 | 10,427 | 17,751 | 1,521 | 52,574 | 42.38% | 1 |
| Austrian People's Party | ÖVP | 17,674 | 4,961 | 16,387 | 1,686 | 40,708 | 32.81% | 1 |
| Freedom Party of Austria | FPÖ | 5,878 | 2,601 | 4,816 | 393 | 13,688 | 11.03% | 0 |
| The Greens | GRÜNE | 3,617 | 2,060 | 2,899 | 626 | 9,202 | 7.42% | 0 |
| Hans-Peter Martin's List | MATIN | 1,497 | 734 | 1,502 | 139 | 3,872 | 3.12% | 0 |
| Alliance for the Future of Austria | BZÖ | 1,213 | 591 | 1,130 | 82 | 3,016 | 2.43% | 0 |
| Communist Party of Austria | KPÖ | 400 | 244 | 322 | 28 | 994 | 0.80% | 0 |
| Valid Votes | | 53,154 | 21,618 | 44,807 | 4,475 | 124,054 | 100.00% | 2 |
| Rejected Votes | | 1,160 | 418 | 916 | 50 | 2,544 | 2.01% | |
| Total Polled | | 54,314 | 22,036 | 45,723 | 4,525 | 126,598 | 83.63% | |
| Registered Electors | | 66,563 | 29,243 | 55,564 | | 151,370 | | |
| Turnout | | 81.60% | 75.35% | 82.29% | | 83.63% | | |

The following candidates were elected:

- Party mandates - Johann Rädler (ÖVP), 5,176 votes; and Peter Wittmann (SPÖ), 5,307 votes.

===== 2002 =====
Results of the 2002 legislative election held on 24 November 2002:

| Party | | Votes per district | | | | Total votes | % | Seats |
| Party | | Neun- kirchen | Wiener Neu- stadt City | Wiener Neu- stadt | Voting card | Total votes | % | Seats |
|---|---|---|---|---|---|---|---|---|
| Social Democratic Party of Austria | SPÖ | 24,500 | 11,619 | 18,615 | 1,053 | 55,787 | 43.97% | 1 |
| Austrian People's Party | ÖVP | 22,988 | 7,291 | 20,515 | 1,617 | 52,411 | 41.31% | 1 |
| Freedom Party of Austria | FPÖ | 3,825 | 1,685 | 3,241 | 201 | 8,952 | 7.06% | 0 |
| The Greens | GRÜNE | 3,359 | 1,863 | 2,478 | 448 | 8,148 | 6.42% | 0 |
| Liberal Forum | LiF | 340 | 244 | 329 | 34 | 947 | 0.75% | 0 |
| Communist Party of Austria | KPÖ | 258 | 153 | 194 | 11 | 616 | 0.49% | 0 |
| Valid Votes | | 55,270 | 22,855 | 45,372 | 3,364 | 126,861 | 100.00% | 2 |
| Rejected Votes | | 1,030 | 342 | 722 | 17 | 2,111 | 1.64% | |
| Total Polled | | 56,300 | 23,197 | 46,094 | 3,381 | 128,972 | 88.27% | |
| Registered Electors | | 65,026 | 28,155 | 52,930 | | 146,111 | | |
| Turnout | | 86.58% | 82.39% | 87.08% | | 88.27% | | |

The following candidates were elected:

- Party mandates - Johann Rädler (ÖVP), 4,869 votes; and Peter Wittmann (SPÖ), 5,934 votes.

==== 1990s ====
===== 1999 =====
Results of the 1999 legislative election held on 3 October 1999:

| Party | | Votes per district | | | | Total votes | % | Seats |
| Party | | Neun- kirchen | Wiener Neu- stadt City | Wiener Neu- stadt | Voting card | Total votes | % | Seats |
|---|---|---|---|---|---|---|---|---|
| Social Democratic Party of Austria | SPÖ | 21,401 | 9,676 | 16,391 | 1,412 | 48,880 | 40.38% | 1 |
| Austrian People's Party | ÖVP | 14,417 | 3,906 | 12,517 | 1,115 | 31,955 | 26.40% | 1 |
| Freedom Party of Austria | FPÖ | 12,347 | 5,159 | 10,427 | 743 | 28,676 | 23.69% | 1 |
| The Greens | GRÜNE | 2,665 | 1,319 | 1,914 | 344 | 6,242 | 5.16% | 0 |
| Liberal Forum | LiF | 1,027 | 756 | 896 | 206 | 2,885 | 2.38% | 0 |
| The Independents | DU | 509 | 273 | 499 | 31 | 1,312 | 1.08% | 0 |
| Communist Party of Austria | KPÖ | 209 | 186 | 177 | 18 | 590 | 0.49% | 0 |
| No to NATO and EU – Neutral Austria Citizens' Initiative | NEIN | 215 | 83 | 181 | 25 | 504 | 0.42% | 0 |
| Valid Votes | | 52,790 | 21,358 | 43,002 | 3,894 | 121,044 | 100.00% | 3 |
| Rejected Votes | | 1,045 | 374 | 703 | 31 | 2,153 | 1.75% | |
| Total Polled | | 53,835 | 21,732 | 43,705 | 3,925 | 123,197 | 85.30% | |
| Registered Electors | | 64,748 | 27,673 | 52,010 | | 144,431 | | |
| Turnout | | 83.15% | 78.53% | 84.03% | | 85.30% | | |

The following candidates were elected:

- Party mandates - Arnold Grabner (SPÖ), 4,857 votes; Franz Kampichler (ÖVP), 2,661 votes; and Hans Müller (FPÖ), 1,763 votes.

Substitutions:

- Arnold Grabner (SPÖ) resigned on 31 December 2001 and was replaced by Peter Marizzi (SPÖ) on 9 January 2002.

===== 1995 =====
Results of the 1995 legislative election held on 17 December 1995:

| Party | | Votes per district | | | | Total votes | % | Seats |
| Party | | Neun- kirchen | Wiener Neu- stadt City | Wiener Neu- stadt | Voting card | Total votes | % | Seats |
|---|---|---|---|---|---|---|---|---|
| Social Democratic Party of Austria | SPÖ | 25,131 | 11,413 | 18,277 | 996 | 55,817 | 45.38% | 2 |
| Austrian People's Party | ÖVP | 15,449 | 4,393 | 13,272 | 830 | 33,944 | 27.60% | 1 |
| Freedom Party of Austria | FPÖ | 9,254 | 3,983 | 7,838 | 422 | 21,497 | 17.48% | 0 |
| Liberal Forum | LiF | 2,276 | 1,449 | 1,974 | 235 | 5,934 | 4.82% | 0 |
| The Greens | GRÜNE | 1,704 | 745 | 1,131 | 194 | 3,774 | 3.07% | 0 |
| No – Civic Action Group; Against the Sale of Austria | NEIN | 683 | 266 | 553 | 32 | 1,534 | 1.25% | 0 |
| Communist Party of Austria | KPÖ | 192 | 179 | 127 | 4 | 502 | 0.41% | 0 |
| Valid Votes | | 54,689 | 22,428 | 43,172 | 2,713 | 123,002 | 100.00% | 3 |
| Rejected Votes | | 1,376 | 476 | 1,004 | 15 | 2,871 | 2.28% | |
| Total Polled | | 56,065 | 22,904 | 44,176 | 2,728 | 125,873 | 88.97% | |
| Registered Electors | | 63,995 | 27,293 | 50,193 | | 141,481 | | |
| Turnout | | 87.61% | 83.92% | 88.01% | | 88.97% | | |

The following candidates were elected:

- Personal mandates - Johannes Ditz (ÖVP), 6,198 votes.
- Party mandates - Arnold Grabner (SPÖ), 3,162 votes; and Peter Marizzi (SPÖ), 4,264 votes.

Substitutions:

- Johannes Ditz (ÖVP) resigned on 13 March 1996 and was replaced by Franz Kampichler (ÖVP) on 14 March 1996.

===== 1994 =====
Results of the 1994 legislative election held on 9 October 1994:

| Party | | Votes per district | | | | Total votes | % | Seats |
| Party | | Neun- kirchen | Wiener Neu- stadt City | Wiener Neu- stadt | Voting card | Total votes | % | Seats |
|---|---|---|---|---|---|---|---|---|
| Social Democratic Party of Austria | SPÖ | 22,980 | 10,033 | 16,676 | 1,187 | 50,876 | 42.80% | 1 |
| Austrian People's Party | ÖVP | 14,952 | 3,793 | 12,507 | 945 | 32,197 | 27.08% | 1 |
| Freedom Party of Austria | FPÖ | 9,667 | 3,887 | 7,581 | 828 | 21,963 | 18.48% | 0 |
| Liberal Forum | LiF | 2,399 | 1,598 | 2,024 | 283 | 6,304 | 5.30% | 0 |
| The Greens | GRÜNE | 2,331 | 1,193 | 1,785 | 313 | 5,622 | 4.73% | 0 |
| No – Civic Action Group; Against the Sale of Austria | NEIN | 514 | 223 | 448 | 32 | 1,217 | 1.02% | 0 |
| Communist Party of Austria | KPÖ | 180 | 175 | 111 | 9 | 475 | 0.40% | 0 |
| United Greens Austria – List Adi Pinter | VGÖ | 44 | 25 | 43 | 2 | 114 | 0.10% | 0 |
| Citizen Greens Austria – Free Democrats | BGÖ | 43 | 28 | 33 | 2 | 106 | 0.09% | 0 |
| Valid Votes | | 53,110 | 20,955 | 41,208 | 3,601 | 118,874 | 100.00% | 2 |
| Rejected Votes | | 1,117 | 442 | 904 | 28 | 2,491 | 2.05% | |
| Total Polled | | 54,227 | 21,397 | 42,112 | 3,629 | 121,365 | 85.84% | |
| Registered Electors | | 64,079 | 27,520 | 49,794 | | 141,393 | | |
| Turnout | | 84.63% | 77.75% | 84.57% | | 85.84% | | |

The following candidates were elected:

- Personal mandates - Johannes Ditz (ÖVP), 6,163 votes.
- Party mandates - Arnold Grabner (SPÖ), 5,035 votes.

Substitutions:

- Johannes Ditz (ÖVP) resigned on 12 December 1994 and was replaced by Franz Kampichler (ÖVP) on 13 December 1994.
