= Karl Nehammer =

Chancellor of Austria from 2021 to 2025

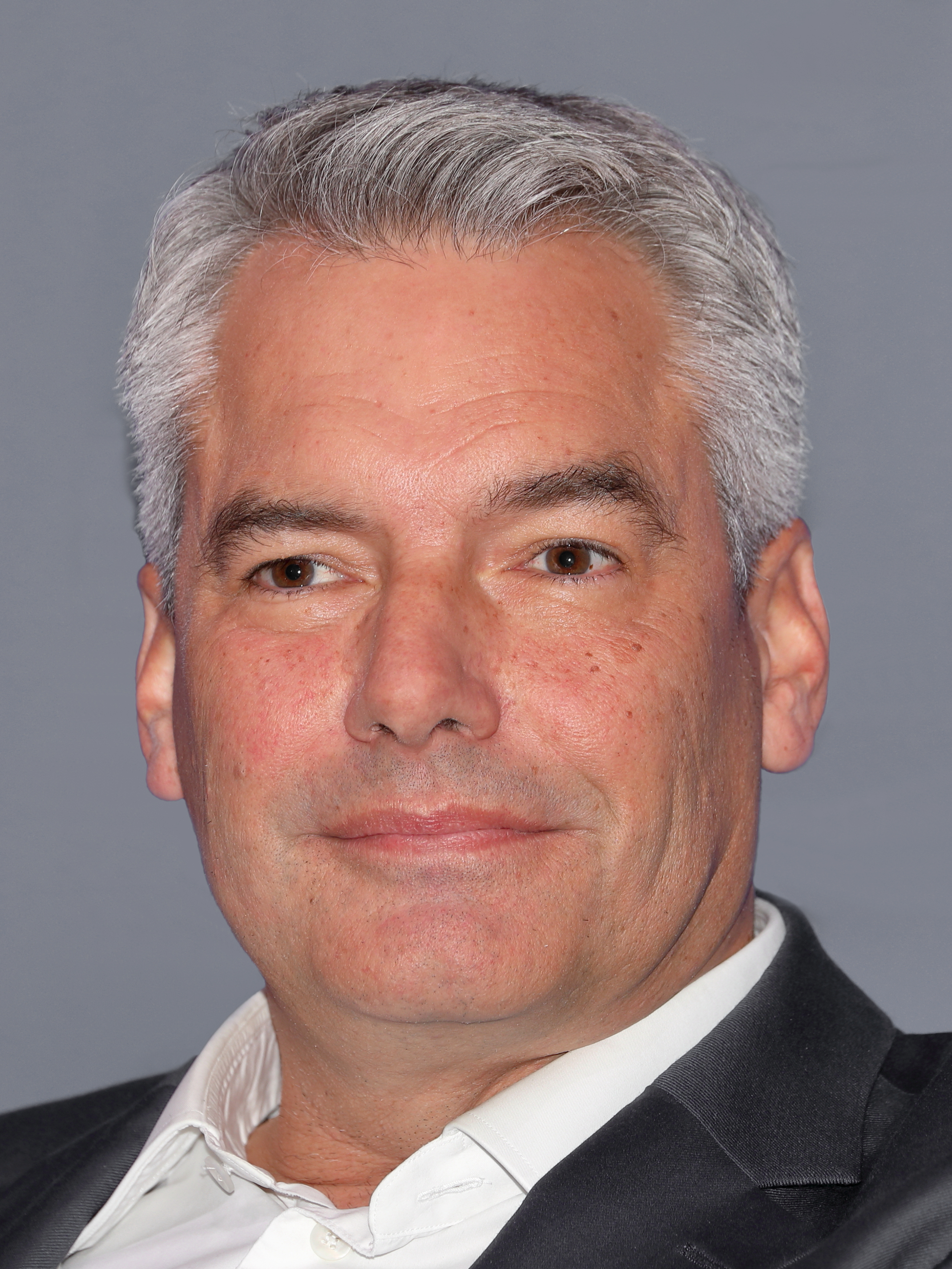
- Nehammer in 2025

Chancellor of Austria
- In office 6 December 2021 – 10 January 2025
- President: Alexander Van der Bellen
- Vice-Chancellor: Werner Kogler (2021–2024)
- Preceded by: Alexander Schallenberg
- Succeeded by: Christian Stocker

Chair of the People's Party
- In office 3 December 2021 – 5 January 2025
- Preceded by: Sebastian Kurz
- Succeeded by: Christian Stocker

Minister for the Interior
- In office 7 January 2020 – 6 December 2021
- Chancellor: Sebastian Kurz; Alexander Schallenberg
- Preceded by: Wolfgang Peschorn
- Succeeded by: Gerhard Karner

Secretary-General of the People's Party
- In office 20 January 2018 – 3 January 2020
- Preceded by: Stefan Steiner
- Succeeded by: Axel Melchior

Member of the National Council
- In office 9 November 2017 – 7 January 2020
- Succeeded by: Rudolf Taschner
- Constituency: 9 – Vienna

Personal details
- Born: 18 October 1972 (age 53) Vienna, Austria
- Party: ÖVP
- Spouse: Katharina Nidetzky
- Children: 2
- Education: University for Continuing Education Krems

Military service
- Allegiance: Austria
- Branch/service: Austrian Army
- Years of service: 1993-1997
- Rank: Lieutenant

Karl Nehammer (Note: German pronunciation: [kaʁl ˈneːhamɐ]) (born 18 October 1972) is an Austrian politician who served as chancellor of Austria from 2021 to 2025. A member of Austrian People's Party (ÖVP), he previously was Minister for the Interior from 2020 to 2021, general secretary of the ÖVP from 2018 to 2020, as well as a member of the National Council from 2017 to 2020. Nehammer assumed the chancellorship as the successor of Alexander Schallenberg, who resigned in order to return to the post of Minister for Foreign Affairs. Nehammer announced his resignation as chancellor and ÖVP leader after unsuccessful coalition talks following the 2024 legislative election. He stepped down as chancellor on 10 January 2025.

== Early life and education ==
Nehammer grew up in Vienna, where he attended Kalksburg Grammar School and subsequently Amerlingstrasse Grammar School, graduating in 1992. He completed his military service as a one-year volunteer with further service until 1996. In 1997 he was discharged as a lieutenant. He then worked as an instructional trainer for information officers for the Federal Ministry of Defence and as a trainer for strategic communication for various institutions, such as the Vocational Promotion Institute (BFI) and the Political Academy of the Austrian People's Party.

From 2012, Nehammer completed a two-year university course in political communication at the University for Continuing Education Krems and graduated with a master's degree.

Nehammer is a member of the Catholic Austrian Students' Corporations Sonnberg Perchtoldsdorf within the Mittelschüler-Kartellverband.

== Political career ==
Nehammer became active within the ÖVP party organisation after leaving the military, initially working with the party academy. He was then head of the service and mobilisation department at the party headquarters from 2007 to 2008 and the training and networking department from 2008 to 2009. He then became director of the party academy's Lower Austria association and was considered close to then-deputy governor Wolfgang Sobotka.

In October 2015, Nehammer was appointed deputy general-secretary and federal organizational speaker of the Austrian Workers' Union (ÖAAB), the trade union association of the ÖVP. During the 2016 Austrian presidential election, he was appointed replacement manager for the ÖVP's Andreas Khol partway through the campaign, but was unable to save him from a historically poor result of 11%.

He succeeded August Wöginger as general-secretary of the ÖAAB in 2016 and held this position until January 2018. In November 2016, he was also elected regional chairman of the ÖAAB Vienna. Since April 2017, he has been district party chairman of the ÖVP in Vienna-Hietzing.

In the 2017 federal election, Nehammer was elected as a representative for Vienna. During the subsequent government formation, he was a member of the ÖVP negotiating team in the area of defence. He was elected as deputy chairman of the ÖVP parliamentary faction on 8 November and was appointed media spokesman. On 25 January 2018, he succeeded Elisabeth Köstinger and Stefan Steiner as general-secretary of the ÖVP. In September 2018, he also succeeded Efgani Dönmez as spokesman for integration and migration.

Nehammer ran in the 2019 federal election in fifth place in the ÖVP Vienna state list, and eleventh place on the ÖVP federal list. He was also one of the ÖVP's five assessors at the electoral authority during the election. In the course of the subsequent government formation, he negotiated in the areas of Europe, migration, integration, and security.

=== Minister for the Interior ===
Nehammer was appointed minister for the interior in the second Kurz government, and was sworn in on 7 January. Under his leadership, the Austrian government filed charges in mid-2020 against a person who had confessed to spying for Turkey's secret service. He was one of three public crisis managers during the COVID-19 pandemic, with responsibility for the enforcement of lockdowns and restrictions. He is considered a strong supporter of Sebastian Kurz's refugee policy.

Nehammer led the government response following the 2020 Vienna attack. He described the attacker as an "Islamist terrorist" and a sympathiser of the Islamic State, and admitted that intelligence services under his jurisdiction had failed to communicate information that could have prevented the attack. Nehammer's wife and children received police protection as a result of death threats received after the attack.

=== Chancellor of Austria ===
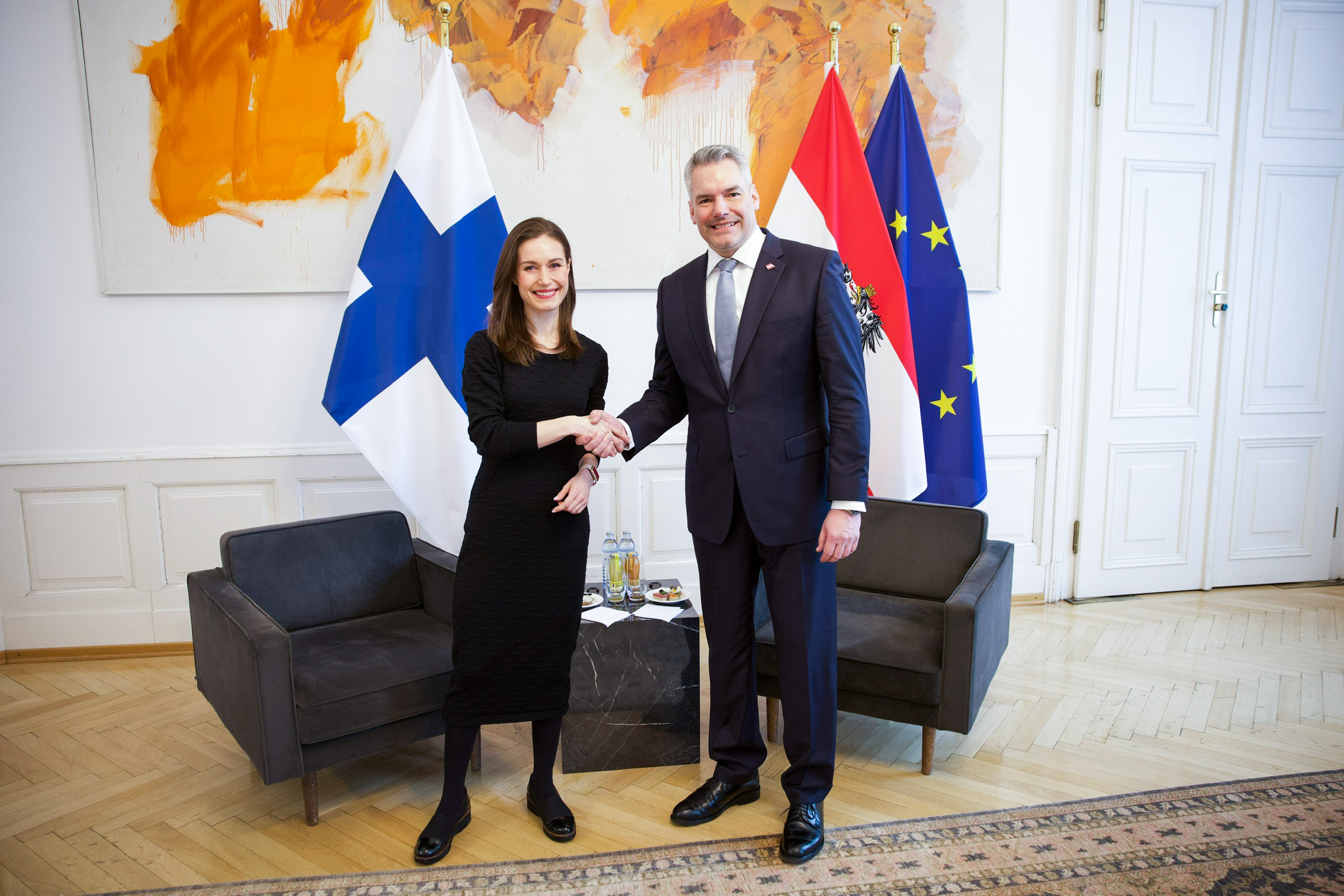
Nehammer with Finnish prime minister Sanna Marin, February 2023

In October 2021, Sebastian Kurz resigned as chancellor in the wake of a corruption investigation and was succeeded by Foreign Minister Alexander Schallenberg. Kurz remained as leader of the ÖVP until 2 December, when he announced his retirement from politics. Soon afterwards, Schallenberg announced he would not seek the leadership and would resign as chancellor in favour of the new ÖVP leader once one had been elected. On 3 December, Nehammer was provisionally appointed as leader of the ÖVP by the federal party committee and proposed as chancellor. He was sworn in by President Alexander Van der Bellen on 6 December. In an extraordinary party convention on 14 May 2022, Nehammer was elected ÖVP chairman by 100% of the votes.

During the Russian invasion of Ukraine, Nehammer visited the Ukrainian capital Kyiv on 9 April 2022, and then Moscow, where he met Russian president Vladimir Putin on 12 April 2022. Nehammer said he confronted Putin about Russia's war crimes in Ukraine and told him "it’s necessary to have international justice, the United Nations there." After the meeting, Nehammer warned that Putin was planning a new offensive in eastern Ukraine.

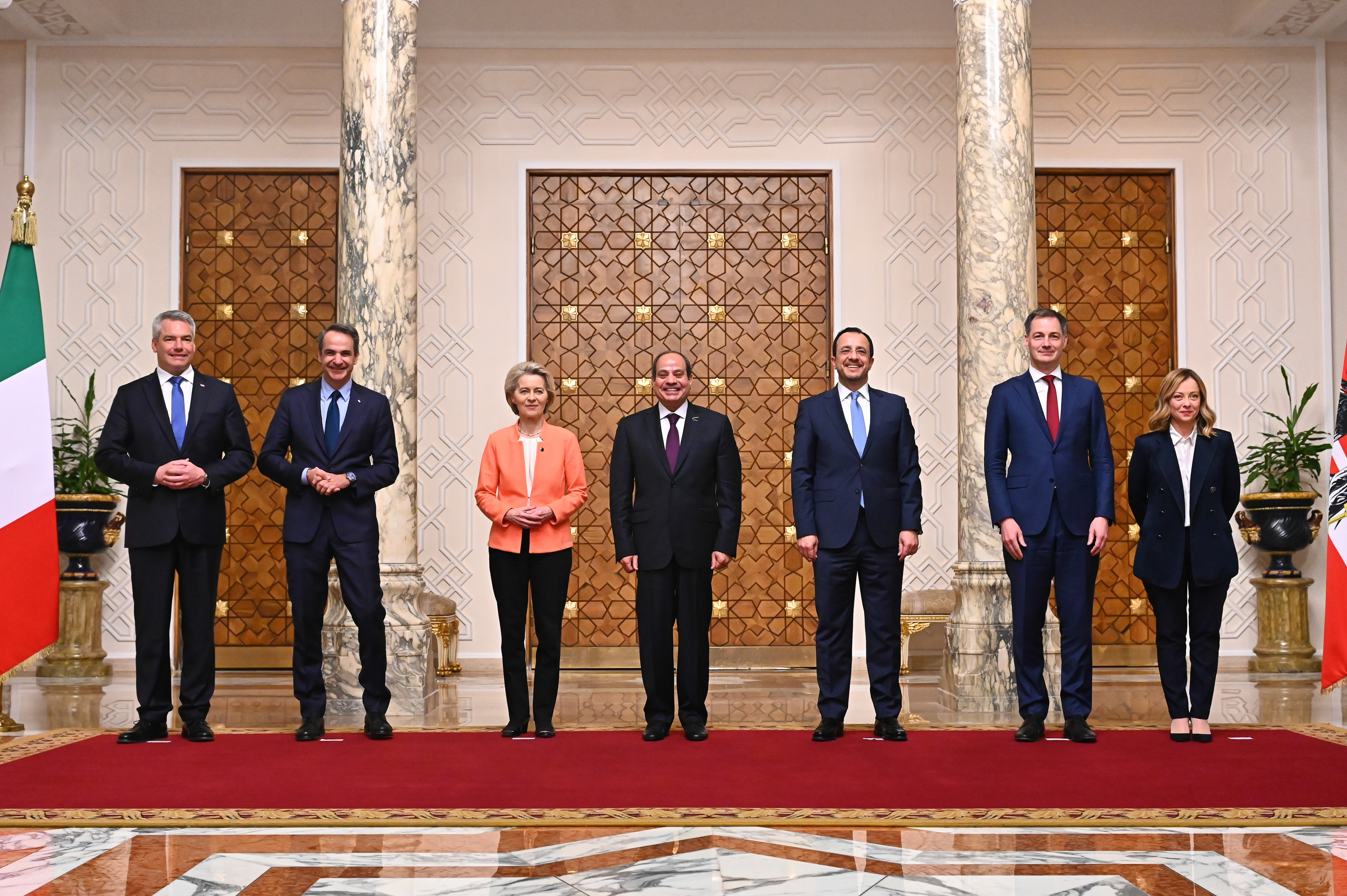
Nehammer with Egyptian President Abdel Fattah el-Sisi, Italian Prime Minister Giorgia Meloni and other European leaders in Cairo, 17 March 2024

Under Nehammer's leadership, Austria's government implemented a package of measures worth six billion euros ($6.3 billion) in 2022 aimed at cushioning the blow to households of the rising cost of living.

On 8 December 2022 Nehammer was the architect of the sole veto against Bulgaria's and Romania's admission in the Schengen Area on 1 January the following year. This caused an outrage in Romania, who drastically reduced bilateral relations with Austria as a result. As of November 2024, neither Bulgaria or Romania is fully part of the Schengen Area.

In an interview with the German newspaper Die Welt in September 2023, Nehammer called for the termination of full membership negotiations between the EU and Turkey and the development of a new concept within the relations between the EU and Turkey.

Nehammer expressed support for Israel during the Gaza war. In October 2023, he rejected calls for a ceasefire in Gaza, saying that "All the fantasies of truces, ceasefires, etc. have the effect of strengthening Hamas in its determination to continue its action and perpetuate this terrible terror." In January 2024, he criticized South Africa's genocide case against Israel.

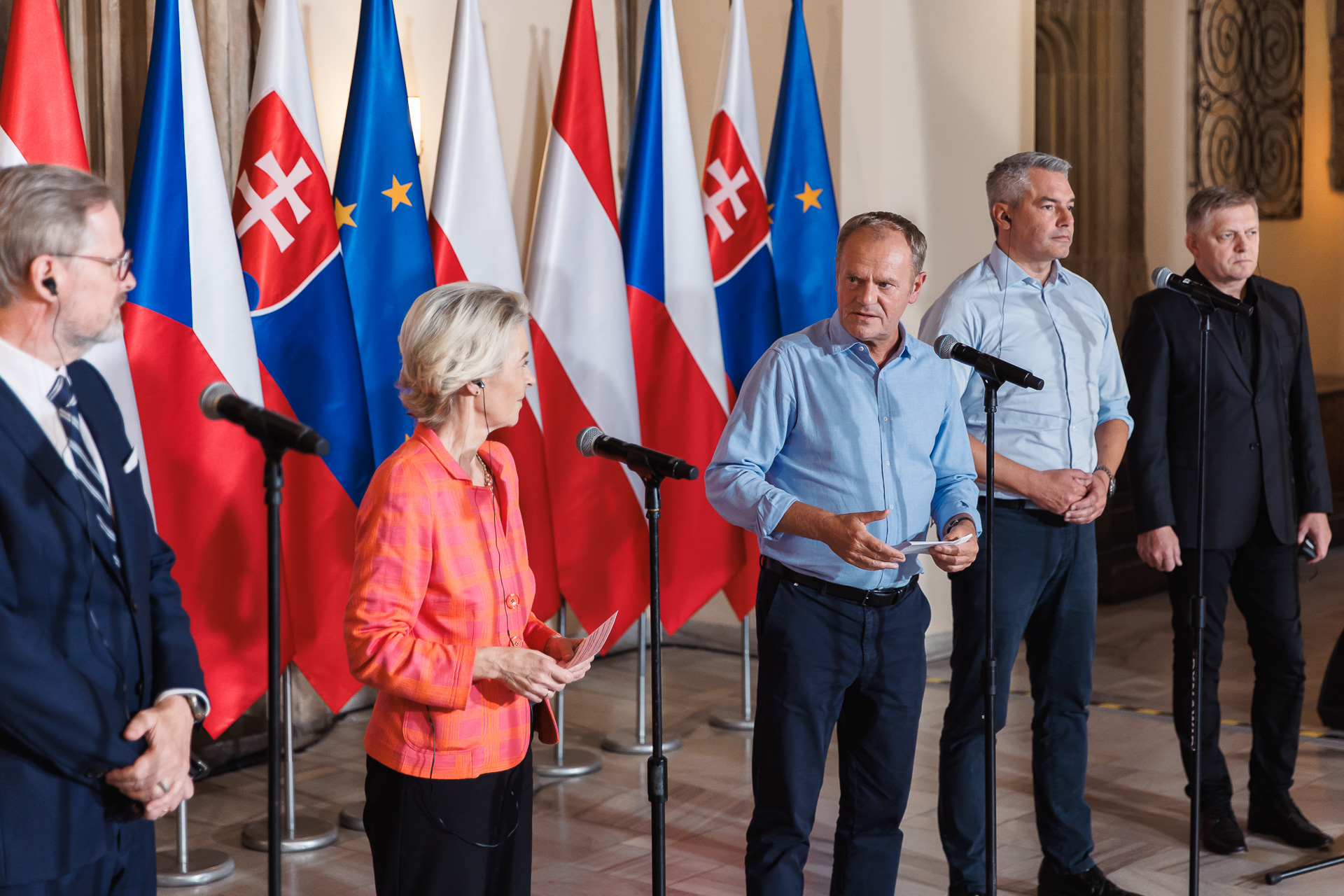
Nehammer with Petr Fiala, Ursula von der Leyen, Donald Tusk and Robert Fico in Wrocław, Poland, 19 September 2024

In the 2024 Austrian legislative election held on 29 September, the ÖVP placed second to the far-right Freedom Party of Austria (FPÖ), which gained a plurality of seats in the National Council. However, no party in parliament agreed to form a coalition with the FPÖ, which led to Nehammer being asked by President Van der Bellen to form a new government on 22 October.

On 4 January 2025, Nehammer said that he would step down as party leader and as chancellor, following the failure of the government coalition talks between his party, SPÖ, and NEOS after the 2024 legislative election.

== Other activities ==
- National Fund of the Republic of Austria for Victims of National Socialism, Member of the Board of Trustees (since 2020)

== Recognition ==
On 22 February 2022 Greek minister of migration & asylum Notis Mitarachi awarded Karl Nehammer the Commendation Medal of First Class Migration Assistance in recognition of Nehammer's and the Austrian government's contribution in managing the crisis in Evros in March 2020.

== Personal life ==
Nehammer is married to fellow ÖVP member Katharina Nehammer. They have two children. The couple received criticism in early 2020 after Katharina was appointed spokeswoman for the Ministry of Defence, with Herbert Kickl accusing the government of putting interior and defence policy "in the hands of one family". She began working in the private sector in public relations in July 2020. Nehammer's father-in-law is former ORF presenter Peter Nidetzky.

== See also ==
- List of chancellors of Austria

Political offices
Preceded by Wolfgang Peschorn	Minister for the Interior; 2020–2021	Succeeded by Gerhard Karner
Preceded by Alexander Schallenberg	Chancellor of Austria; 2021–2025	Succeeded by Alexander Schallenberg; Acting
Party political offices
Preceded by Sebastian Kurz	Chair of the People's Party; 2021–present	Incumbent
