= Christian Stocker =

Chancellor of Austria since 2025

His Excellency Christian Stocker
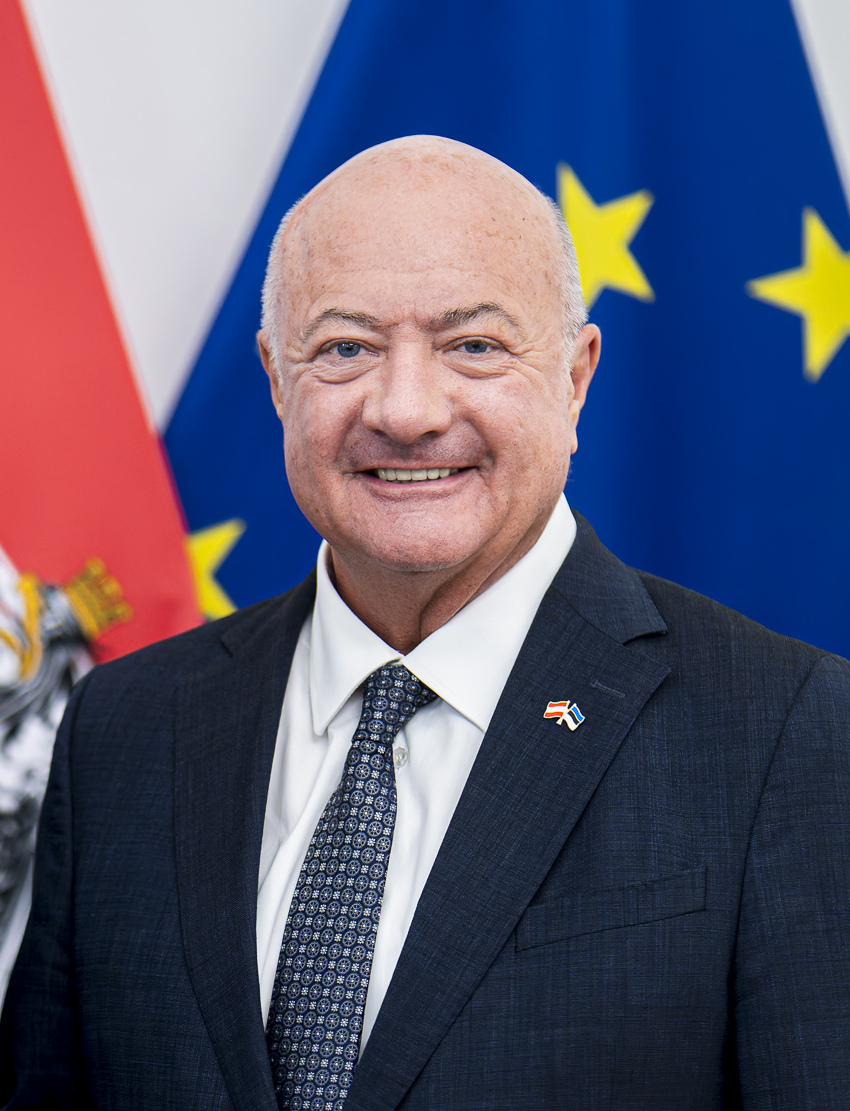
- Stocker in 2026

Chancellor of Austria
- Incumbent
- Assumed office 3 March 2025
- President: Alexander Van der Bellen
- Vice-Chancellor: Andreas Babler
- Preceded by: Karl Nehammer

Chair of the People's Party
- Incumbent
- Assumed office 5 January 2025 (Note: Acting: 5 January – 29 March 2025)
- Preceded by: Karl Nehammer

Member of the National Council
- In office 12 June 2019 – 6 March 2025
- Preceded by: Johann Rädler
- Constituency: Lower Austria South

Secretary-General of the People's Party
- In office 23 September 2022 – 5 January 2025
- Leader: Karl Nehammer
- Preceded by: Laura Sachslehner
- Succeeded by: Alexander Pröll

Personal details
- Born: 20 March 1960 (age 66) Wiener Neustadt, Austria
- Party: ÖVP
- Spouse: Gerda Legenstein
- Children: 2
- Parent: Franz Stocker (father)
- Education: University of Vienna

Christian Stocker (Note: German pronunciation: [ˈkʁɪsti̯an ˈʃtɔkɐ]) (born 20 March 1960) is an Austrian politician who has served as chancellor of Austria since March 2025. A member of the People's Party (ÖVP), he has been a member of the National Council since 2019 and Chair of the People's Party since 5 January 2025. He had previously served as general secretary of the party from September 2022 to January 2025. On 5 January 2025, he was elected new acting party leader of the People's Party, following the resignation of Chancellor Karl Nehammer.

Born and raised in Wiener Neustadt, Stocker, the son of an ÖVP politician, studied law at the University of Vienna. A lifelong member of the ÖVP, he served in various party offices since being elected member of the National Council in 2019.

After ruling it out before, Stocker announced the ÖVP's willingness to enter coalition talks with Herbert Kickl and his far-right FPÖ party. Coalition talks between ÖVP, SPÖ, and NEOS previously failed in the aftermath of the 2024 Austrian legislative election. On 27 February 2025, the SPÖ, ÖVP, and NEOS announced an agreement to form a coalition government to be led by Stocker as chancellor.

== Early life and education ==
Stocker was born and raised in Wiener Neustadt. His father, Franz Stocker (1933–2026), was a ÖVP representative in the National Council. Stocker attend elementary and secondary school in Wiener Neustadt. He studied law at the University of Vienna from 1979, graduating with a master's degree in 1986. In 1988, he received a doctorate in law.

== Political career ==
On 12 June 2019, Stocker was sworn in as a member of the National Council during the XXVI legislative period, succeeding Johann Rädler, who had resigned his mandate. In June 2021, he was re-elected as chairman of the ÖVP in Wiener Neustadt. In December 2021, he was appointed spokesperson for internal affairs and security within the ÖVP parliamentary club.

In March 2022, Stocker was elected deputy district party chairman, and in September 2022, he was appointed secretary-general of the ÖVP. For the 2024 National Council election, he was the party's top candidate in the Lower Austria South district and was placed seventh on the ÖVP's federal list, securing a direct mandate from his district. Following the election, he became a member of the ÖVP's negotiating team for government formation discussions with the Social Democratic Party (SPÖ) and the NEOS.

On 5 January 2025, Stocker was appointed Chairman of the ÖVP following the resignation of Karl Nehammer, which came after the unsuccessful tripartite coalition negotiations between the ÖVP, SPÖ, and NEOS. Under his leadership, the ÖVP initiated negotiations with the Freedom Party of Austria (FPÖ), which had emerged as the strongest party in the 2024 legislative election. Despite Stocker having previously expressed strong criticism of the FPÖ, negotiations between the two parties continued but ultimately failed on 12 February 2025.

After the 2025 local council elections in Lower Austria, Stocker resigned from his mandate in Wiener Neustadt and stepped down as deputy mayor, though he remained the city's party chairman.

=== Chancellor of Austria ===
Following renewed coalition negotiations between the ÖVP, SPÖ, and NEOS, Stocker emerged as the leading candidate for the office of Chancellor. He was sworn in as Chancellor of Austria on 3 March 2025, forming the Stocker government. On 29 March 2025, he was elected chairman of the ÖVP at the party's national convention with 98.4% of the votes.

Following the Israeli strikes on Iran in June 2025, Stocker stated that the "Iranian nuclear program is a cause for great concern", saying that Iran must not be allowed to acquire nuclear weapons, and "appeals to everyone for a swift return to the negotiation table".

In July 2026, in response to the migration crisis in Ceuta, Stocker criticised Spain's migration policy, arguing that its regularisation of undocumented migrants could encourage further illegal migration. He warned that Austria could temporarily close its borders within the Schengen Area if the crisis resulted in increased migration pressure on Austria.

== See also ==
- List of current heads of state and government
- List of heads of the executive by approval rating

== Notes ==
Political offices
Preceded by Karl Nehammer	Chancellor of Austria; 2025–present	Incumbent
Party political offices
Preceded by Karl Nehammer	Acting Chair of the People's Party; 2025–present	Incumbent
