= Johann Rädler =

Austrian politician

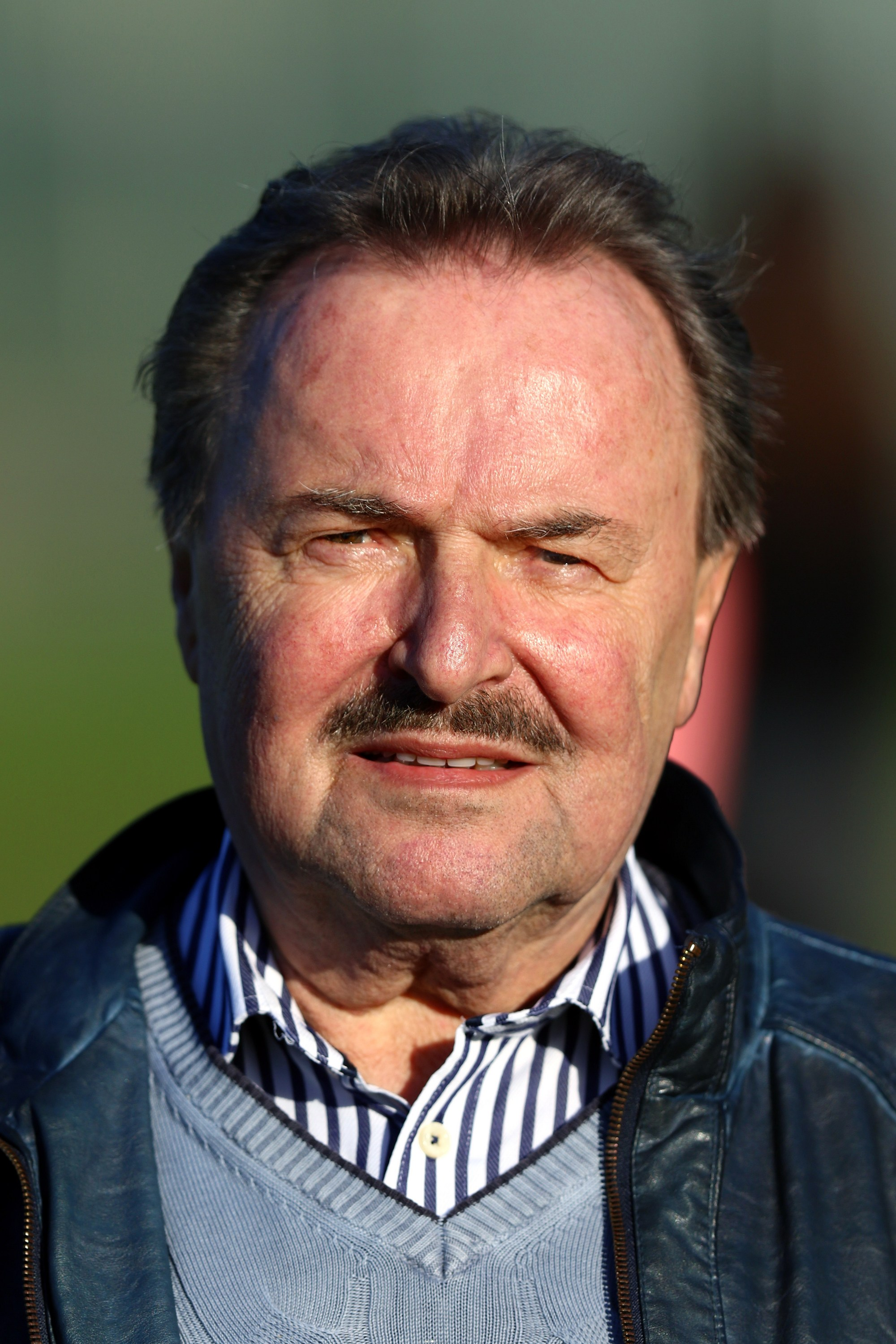
- Rädler in 2018

Member of the National Council
- In office 20 December 2002 – 11 June 2019
- Preceded by: Franz Kampichler
- Succeeded by: Christian Stocker
- Constituency: Lower Austria South

Mayor of Bad Erlach
- In office 2000–2022

Personal details
- Born: 13 June 1952 (age 74) Bad Erlach, Lower Austria, Soviet-controlled Austria
- Party: Austrian People's Party
- Children: 1

Johann Rädler (YO-hahn RED-ler; Austrian German pronunciation: [ˈjoːhan ˈrɛːdlɐ]; born 13 June 1952) is an Austrian former politician. A member of the People's Party (ÖVP), he served as Member of the National Council from Lower Austria South from 2002 to 2019. Additionally, he was mayor of Bad Erlach from 2000 to 2022.

== Early life and education ==
Rädler was born in Bad Erlach, Lower Austria on 13 June 1952.

Rädler attended elementary and secondary schools from 1958 to 1966. He attended a polytechnic course between 1966 and 1967, and did his studies at an agricultural college between 1968 and 1970.

== Career ==
From 1974 to 1981, Rädler was a civil defense instructor. From there and until 1993, he was a press officer of the Lower Austrian Provincial Government's Press Office. After this, up until 2007, he was the managing director of the Environmental Consulting Division.

=== Political career ===
A lifelong member of the ÖVP and founding member of its youth wing in Bad Erlach in 1968, Rädler was elected the party's local Bad Erlach chairman in 1977. From 1980 to 2000, Rädler was a municipal council member of the city. In 2000, he became mayor of the city.

Meanwhile, from 1986 to 2012, he was additionally district party chairman of the ÖVP in Wiener Neustadt and from 1996 to 2008, District Chairman of the Austrian Workers' Union (ÖAAB) in Wiener Neustadt.

As a result of the 2002 Austrian legislative election, Rädler was elected to the National Council from the Lower Austria South district, where he served from 20 December 2002 to 11 June 2019. He has been re-elected to the position in the 2006, 2008, 2013, and 2017 legislative elections.

A Member of Parliament once described as "barely noticed by the public" by Austrian Newspaper Die Presse, Rädler became a center of controversy when he interjected "We're not in Bosnia here!" during fellow parliamentary, Bosnian-born Alma Zadić's speech. He later commented the incident, but refused to apologize.

On 11 June 2019, Rädler resigned from the National Council and was replaced by Christian Stocker (ÖVP) the next day.

== Personal life ==
Rädler is married, and his son, Christian Rädler, is an Austrian entrepreneur who served as CEO of the controversial WET Group (formerly NÖ-Wohnbaugruppe).

In 2018, controversy erupted in the locality Brunn bei Pitten, where the locals opposed a construction project by Christian Rädler's WET Group. It was argued by some to be unlawful and endangering, was reported by National Council Members of the SPÖ, including Johannes Jarolim, to Justice Minister Josef Moser, and resulted in nepotism allegations regarding the Rädlers.
